= Bolívar (disambiguation) =

Simón Bolívar (1783–1830) was the Venezuelan leader of independence movements in several South American countries, and the namesake of the country Bolivia. The surname Bolívar is of Basque origin, deriving from the village of Bolibar in Spanish Biscay. The name comes from the Basque bolu ("windmill") and ibar ("valley").

Bolívar or Bolivar may also refer to:

== Film and television ==
- Bolívar (TV series), a 2019 Colombian series distributed by Netflix
- Bolivar (Disney), Donald Duck's St. Bernard dog in the Disney cartoons
- Bolibar, a 1928 British film based on the 1920 novel The Marquis of Bolibar
- The Marquis of Bolibar, a 1922 Austrian film based on the same novel
- Bolívar, theatrical drama of Jules Supervielle
- Bolívar, mini-series for television written and directed in 1983 by Betty Kaplan

== Places ==
- The Bolivarian countries, Bolivia, Colombia, Ecuador, Panama, Peru, and Venezuela

=== Argentina ===
- Bolívar Partido, an administrative division of Buenos Aires Province

=== Australia ===
- Bolivar, South Australia

=== Bolivia ===
- Bolívar, Cochabamba
- Bolívar Province, Bolivia

=== Colombia ===
- Bolívar Department
- Bolívar, Cauca, a town and municipality
- Bolívar, Santander, a town and municipality
- Bolívar, Valle del Cauca, a town and municipality

=== Costa Rica ===
- Bolívar District, Grecia, a district in the Grecia Canton of Alajuela Province

=== Ecuador ===
- Bolívar Province (Ecuador)
- Bolívar Canton, Carchi, a canton
- Bolívar Canton, Manabí, a canton

=== France ===
- Bolivar station (Paris Metro), a station on line 7 bis

=== Peru ===
- Bolívar, Peru, the capital city of Bolívar District
- Bolívar District, Bolívar, a district
- Bolívar Province, Peru, a province in La Libertad Region

=== Spain ===
- Cenarruza-Puebla de Bolívar, known Ziortza-Bolibar in Basque, the origin of the name
- Bolibar, Álava, a hamlet in Basque country, Spain

=== United States ===
- Bolivar, Alabama
- Bolivar, Georgia
- Bolivar Township, Benton County, Indiana
- Bolivar, Louisiana
- Bolivar County, Mississippi
- Bolivar, Missouri
- Bolivar (town), New York
- Bolivar (village), New York
- Bolivar, Ohio
- Bolivar, Pennsylvania
- Bolivar, Tennessee
- Bolivar, Texas
- Bolivar Peninsula, Texas
  - Bolivar Lighthouse, Texas
  - Bolivar Roads (Texas)
  - Port Bolivar, Texas
- Bolivar, West Virginia

=== Uruguay ===
- Bolívar, Montevideo, a barrio
- Bolívar, Uruguay, a village in Canelones Department

=== Venezuela ===
- Bolívar (state)
  - Ciudad Bolívar (Bolivar City), formerly Angostura, capital of the state of Bolívar
  - Roman Catholic Archdiocese of Ciudad Bolívar
- Bolívar, Aragua, a municipality
- Bolívar, Barinas, a municipality
- Bolívar, Falcón, a municipality
- Bolívar Municipality, Monagas, a municipality
- Bolívar Municipality, Sucre, a municipality
- Bolívar, Táchira, a municipality
- Bolívar, Yaracuy, a municipality

== Sports ==
- Bolívar (footballer, born 1954), Bolívar Modualdo Guedes, Brazilian football midfielder
- Bolívar (footballer, born 1980), Fabian Guedes, Brazilian football manager and former centre-back
- Bolívar S.C., an association football club based in Ciudad Bolívar, Venezuela
- Club Bolívar, an association football club based in Bolivia
- Club Ciudad de Bolívar, an Argentine volleyball club from the homonymous city
- Seguros Bolívar Open Barranquilla, a tennis tournament held in Colombia and Costa Rica
- Copa Simón Bolívar, International South American football tournament played between 1970 and 1976

== Other uses ==
- Bolívar (cigar brand)
- Venezuelan bolívar, the unit of currency of Venezuela
- Bolivar Coastal Field, an oilfield in Maracaibo Lake
- Bolívar Park (Medellín, Colombia)
- Hotel Bolívar, a historic hotel of Lima (Peru)
- Pico Bolívar, a mountain in the Venezuelan Andes
- Puerto Bolívar Airport, an airport in Colombia
- Puerto Bolívar, a port of Ecuador
- Teatro Bolívar, a theatre in Quito, Ecuador
- Bolivar station (Paris Metro), a station on Paris Metro Line 7bis
- Bolívar Station (Buenos Aires Metro)
- USS Bolivar, Bayfield-class attack transport in the United States
- Bolivar (wasp), a genus of parasitic wasp in subfamily Doryctinae
- Bolívar, opera by Darius Milhaud
- Puerto Bolívar, a port in Cerrejón mine (Colombia)
- Bolívar, a superunit of the first Bolivian boliviano

== People with the surname ==
- Francisco Bolívar Zapata (born 1948), Mexican bioscientist
- Ignacio Bolívar (1850–1944), Spanish entomologist
- María Bolívar (born 1975), Venezuelan politician
- Marta Larraechea Bolívar (born 1944), Chilean politician, First Lady of Chile (1994–2000)
- Nastassja Bolívar (born 1988), Nicaraguan American beauty queen
- Simon Bolivar Buckner (1823–1914), American military officer and politician
- Simon Bolivar Buckner Jr. (1886–1945), American military officer

== People with the given name ==
- Bolivar Echeverria (1941- 2005), Ecuadorian-American philosopher
- Bolivar Arellano (born 1944), Ecuadorian-American photographer and businessman
- Bolívar Gómez (born 1977), Ecuadorian football (soccer) player
- Bolivar Trask, a fictional comic book character from Marvel Comics

== See also ==
- Simón Bolívar (disambiguation)
- Plaza Bolivar (disambiguation)
