= Bolívar Province =

Bolívar Province may refer to:

- Bolívar Province, Bolivia
- Bolívar Province, Ecuador
- Bolívar Province, Peru

== See also ==
- Bolívar (disambiguation)
