= Bolívar District =

Bolívar District may refer to:

- Bolívar District, Bolívar, in Bolívar province, La Libertad region, Peru
- Bolívar District, Grecia, in Alajuela province, Costa Rica

== See also ==
- Bolívar (disambiguation)
