= Borders of Venezuela =

Political boundaries between Venezuela and neighboring territories

Location of Venezuela (and its claimed territory of Guayana Esequiba) in South America

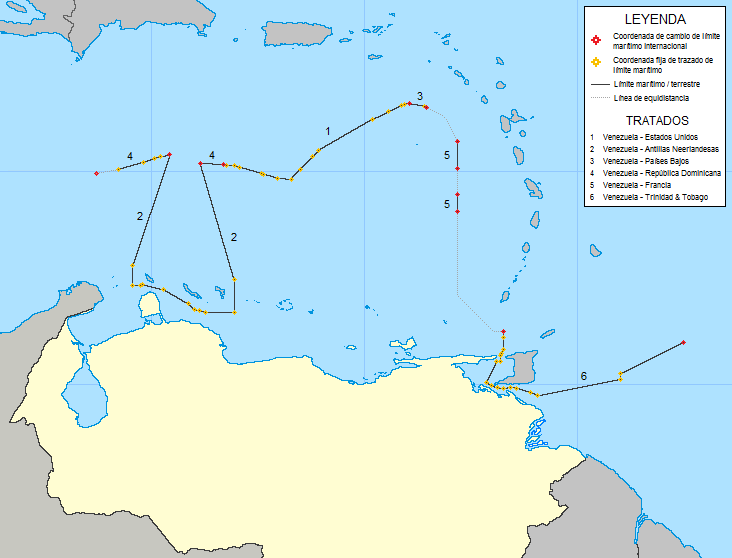
Maritime borders of Venezuela

Venezuela has land and maritime borders with 15 sovereign countries. Its land borders total 5,161 kilometers and are shared with Colombia, Brazil, and Guyana, though the border with Guyana remains disputed due to Venezuela's long-standing claim over the Guayana Esequiba region.

In the Caribbean Sea, Venezuela shares maritime boundaries with eight independent island nations, namely Barbados, Dominica, the Dominican Republic, Grenada, Saint Kitts and Nevis, Saint Lucia, Saint Vincent and the Grenadines, and Trinidad and Tobago. Additionally, its maritime limits border the Caribbean territories of four other sovereign states, including France (Guadeloupe and Martinique), the Kingdom of the Netherlands (Aruba, Bonaire, and Curaçao), the United Kingdom (Montserrat), and the United States (Puerto Rico and the United States Virgin Islands).

Overall, Venezuela has the sixth largest number of land and maritime borders after France, China, the United Kingdom, Russia, the United States and tied with Italy.

== Bordering countries ==
The lengths of the borders Venezuela shares with different countries, running counter-clockwise around Grenada to Caribbean Netherlands, are listed below:

Country	Length (km)	Bordering Venezuelan states	Border features	Border crossings
Grenada	160	Sucre	N/A	N/A
Trinidad and Tobago	11	Sucre; Delta Amacuro	Gulf of Paria; Bocas del Dragón	Güiria
Guyana	743	Delta Amacuro; Bolívar	Mount Roraima	N/A
Brazil (border)	2,200	Bolívar; Amazonas	Mount Roraima	Santa Elena de Uairen
Colombia (border)	2,219	Amazonas; Apure; Táchira; Zulia; Falcón	Táchira River; Gulf of Venezuela; Guajira Peninsula	Puerto Ayacucho; San Fernando de Atabapo; Simón Bolívar International Bridge; Ureña
(Kingdom of the Netherlands) Netherlands, Kingdom of the →includes: →Aruba →Curaçao →Bonaire	65−80	Falcón	ABC islands	N/A

== Total list ==
This is a list of countries and territories that share land or maritime borders with Venezuela. The number and identity of other countries and territories that neighbor it are listed. Land borders and maritime boundaries are included and are tabulated separately and in combination. For purposes of this list, "maritime boundary" includes boundaries that are recognized by the United Nations Convention on the Law of the Sea, which includes boundaries of territorial waters, contiguous zones, and exclusive economic zones. However, it does not include lake or river boundaries, which are considered land boundaries.

Also included is the number of unique sovereign states that a country or territory shares as neighbors. If the number is higher due to multiple dependencies or unrecognized states bordering the state, the larger number is shown in brackets.

Footnotes are provided to provide clarity regarding the status of certain countries and territories.

Country or territory (Territories without full sovereignty in italics)	No. of land border neighbors	No. of maritime boundary neighbors	Total no. of unique neighbors	Neighboring countries and territories (Territories without full sovereignty in italics) (L) = share only land borders (M) = share only maritime boundaries blank = share land borders and maritime boundaries
Venezuela	3	14 (17)	15 (18)	Barbados (M); Brazil (L); Colombia; Dominica (M); Dominican Republic (M); France (M); Grenada (M); Guyana; Netherlands (M); Saint Kitts and Nevis (M); Saint Lucia (M); Saint Vincent and the Grenadines (M); Trinidad and Tobago (M); Aruba (Netherlands) (M); Curaçao (Netherlands) (M); Montserrat (United Kingdom) (M); Puerto Rico (United States) (M); United States Virgin Islands (United States) (M)

== Border disputes ==
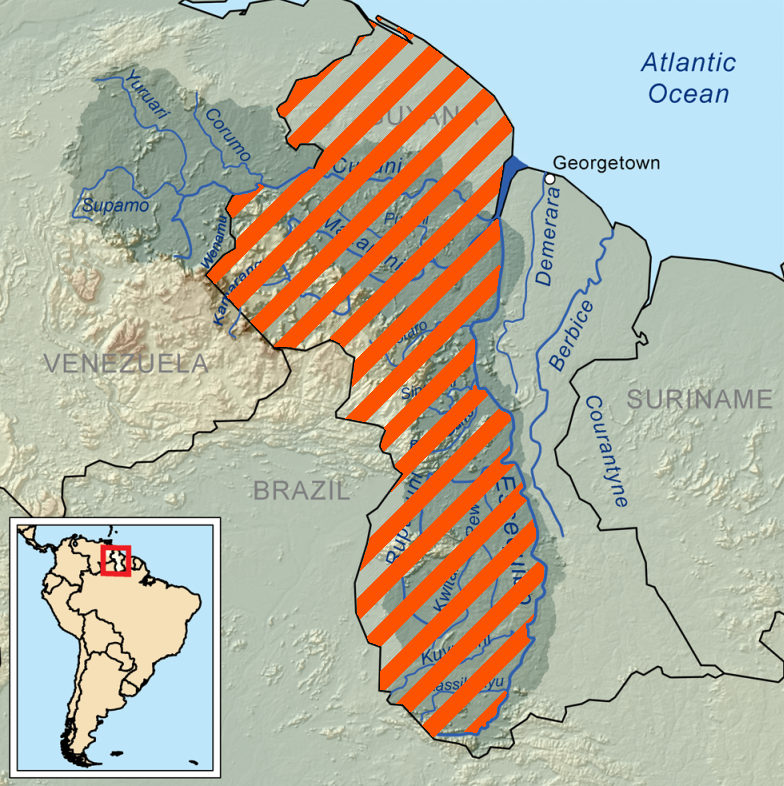
Guayana Esequiba (striped), the area claimed by Venezuela.

=== With Guyana ===
- Guyana–Venezuela territorial dispute

== Gallery ==
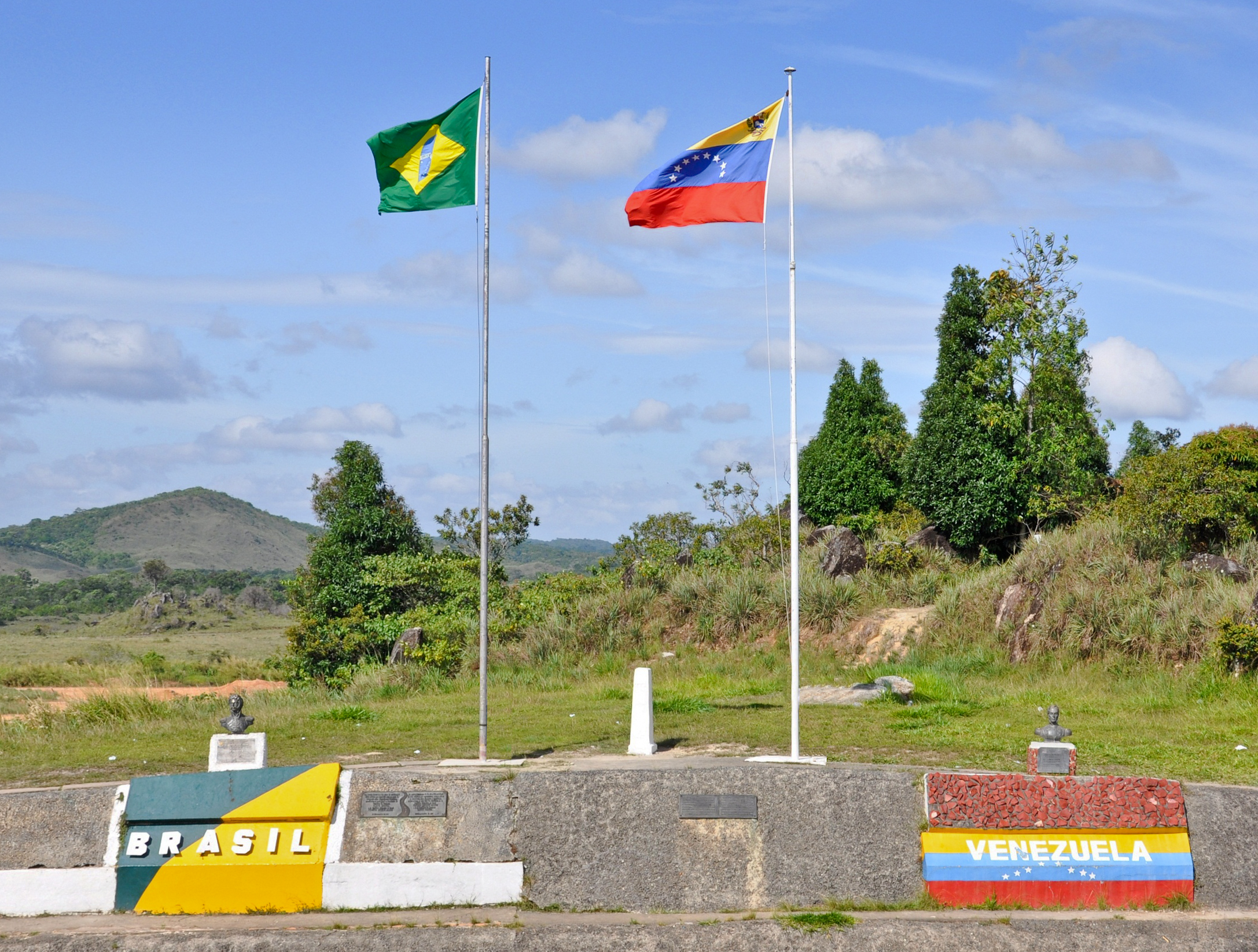
Flags of Brazil and Venezuela on the Brazil-Venezuela border in Pacaraima, Brazil.

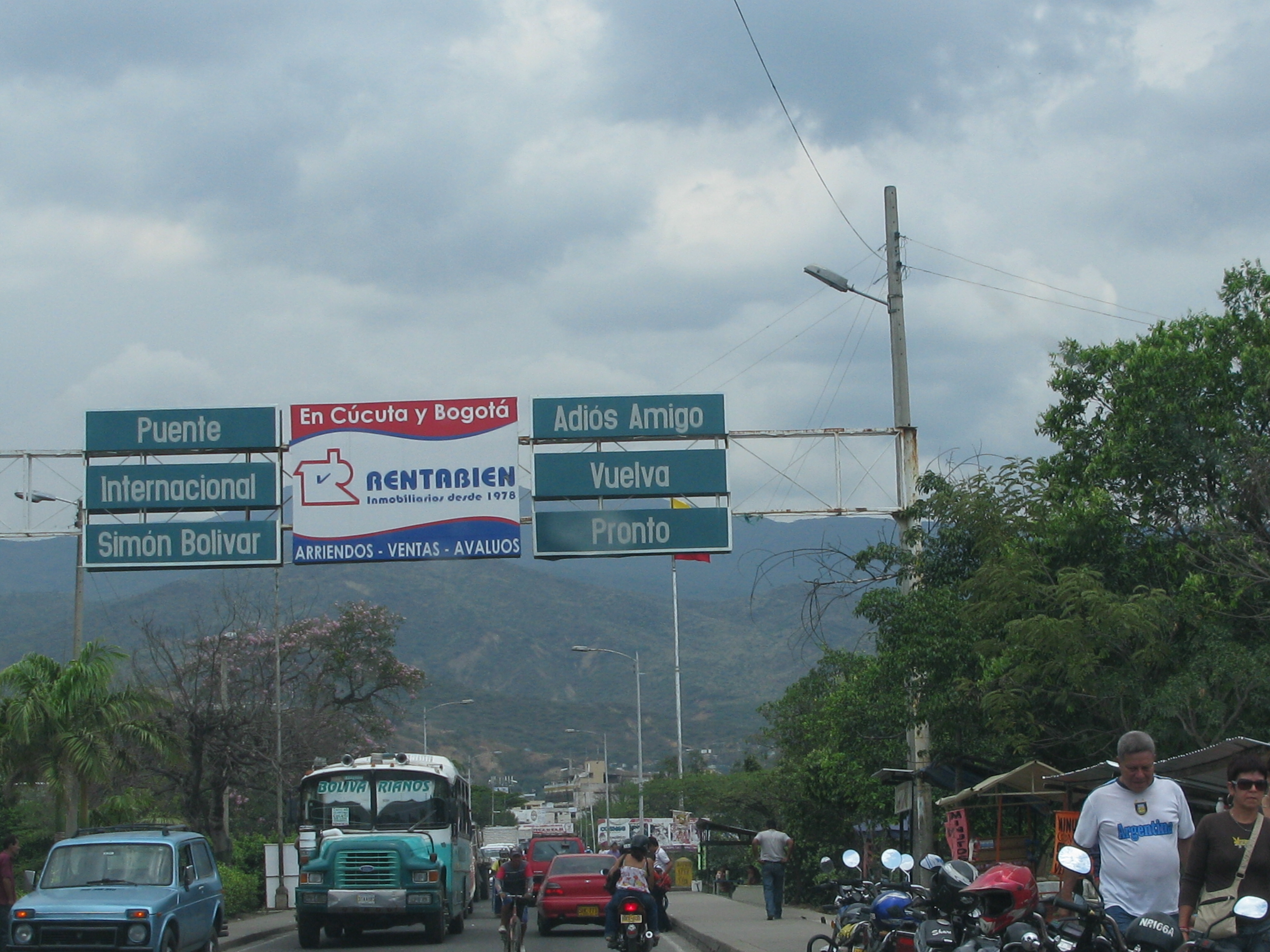
Simón Bolívar International Bridge in Cúcuta, Colombia.

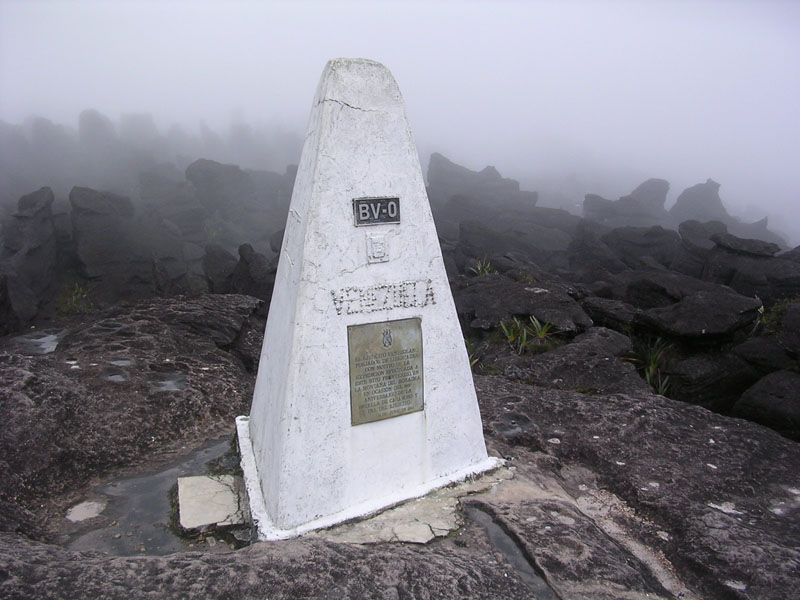
Tripoint between Brazil, Venezuela and Guyana located on Mount Roraima. Due to the Guyana–Venezuela territorial dispute, Venezuela does not recognize this point as the tripoint.

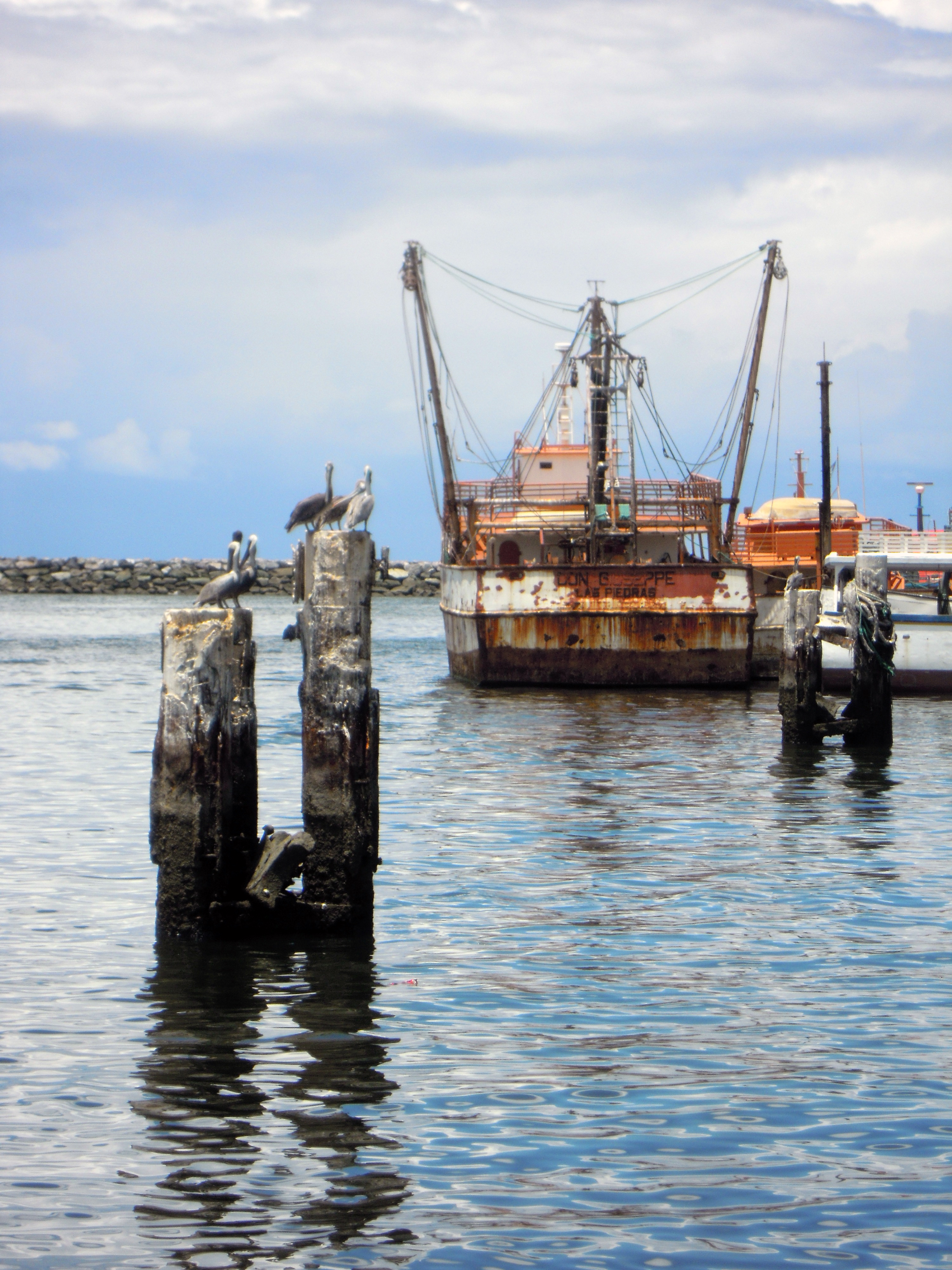
Port of Güiria in Güiria, Sucre, located near the border with Trinidad and Tobago.

== See also ==
- Borders of Brazil
- Borders of Colombia
- Borders of the United States
- Netherlands–Venezuela Boundary Treaty
- United States–Venezuela Maritime Boundary Treaty
- Gran Colombia
- The Guianas
- Venezuela–Colombia migrant crisis
- Venezuelan refugee crisis
