= Jach'a Khuchi =

Mountain in Bolivia

- Location within Bolivia

Highest point
- Elevation: 4,464 m (14,646 ft)
- Coordinates: 17°56′11″S 66°27′57″W

Geography
- Location: Bolivia, Cochabamba Department
- Parent range: Andes

Jach'a Khuchi (Aymara jach'a big, khuchi pig, "big pig", also spelled Jachcha Kochi) is a 4,464-metre-high (14,646 ft) mountain in the Bolivian Andes. It is located in the Cochabamba Department, in the east of the Bolívar Province. Jach'a Khuchi lies northwest of Sirk'i.
