= Bolívar Municipality =

Bolívar Municipality may refer to:

== Bolivia ==
- Bolívar Municipality, Cochabamba

== Venezuela ==
- Bolívar Municipality, Aragua
- Bolívar Municipality, Barinas
- Bolívar Municipality, Falcón
- Bolívar Municipality, Monagas
- Bolívar Municipality, Sucre
- Bolívar Municipality, Táchira
- Bolívar Municipality, Trujillo
- Bolívar Municipality, Yaracuy

== See also ==
- Simón Bolívar Municipality (disambiguation)
