= Bolivar station =

Bolivar station or Bolívar station could refer to:

- Bolivar (Milan Metro)
- Bolivar station (Paris Metro)
- Bolívar (Buenos Aires Underground)
