= Netherlands–Venezuela Boundary Treaty =

1978 treaty between the Netherlands and Venezuela

Boundary Delimitation Treaty between the Republic of Venezuela and the Kingdom of the Netherlands Tratado de Límites Marítimos entre la República de Venezuela y el Reino de los Países Bajos Grensverdrag tussen de Republiek Venezuela en het Koninkrijk der Nederlanden
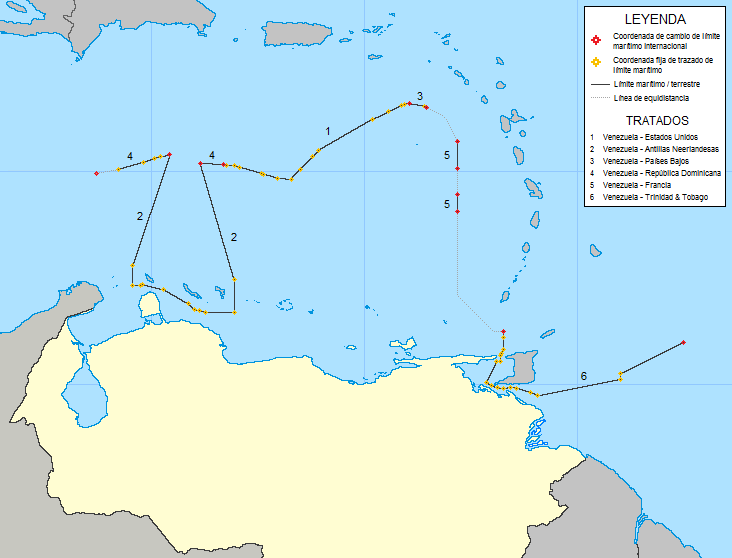
- Map showing the maritime borders between Venezuela, Aruba, Curaçao and the Netherlands Antilles.
- Type: Boundary delimitation
- Signed: 31 March 1978
- Location: Willemstad, Curaçao, Netherlands Antilles
- Parties: Netherlands; Venezuela
- Depositary: United Nations Secretariat
- Languages: Dutch; Spanish

The Netherlands–Venezuela Boundary Treaty is a 1978 treaty between territory of the Netherlands and Venezuela which delimits the maritime boundary between territory of the Kingdom of the Netherlands and Venezuelan territory. When the treaty was concluded in 1978, the treaty set out the boundary between what was known as the Netherlands Antilles and Venezuela. Today, it establishes the boundary between Aruba and Venezuela, between Curaçao and Venezuela, and between the BES islands and Venezuela.

The treaty was signed on 31 March 1978. The text of the treaty establishes a complex border that is set out in four individual maritime sectors. Sector A creates the boundary between the ocean west of Aruba and Venezuelan territory. Sector B creates the boundary between the Venezuelan mainland and the Leeward Islands of the Netherlands Antilles (including Aruba, Bonaire, and Curaçao). Sector C creates the boundary between Bonaire and Venezuelan territory. Finally, further north, Sector D creates the boundary between Isla Aves (Venezuela) and Saba and Sint Eustatius (Netherlands Antilles). The far eastern point of Sector C and the far western point of Sector D are connected by the west–east United States – Venezuela boundary, which was agreed to in the United States – Venezuela Maritime Boundary Treaty, signed just days before the Netherlands–Venezuela treaty.

In places, the boundary lines were adjusted from the natural equidistant lines because of considerations of the placement of oilfields and other mineral deposits in the area.

The full name of the treaty is Boundary Delimitation Treaty between the Republic of Venezuela and the Kingdom of the Netherlands.

== See also ==
- Borders of Venezuela
- United States–Venezuela Maritime Boundary Treaty
