= José Humberto Ocariz =

Venezuelan physician and university professor (1919–2016)

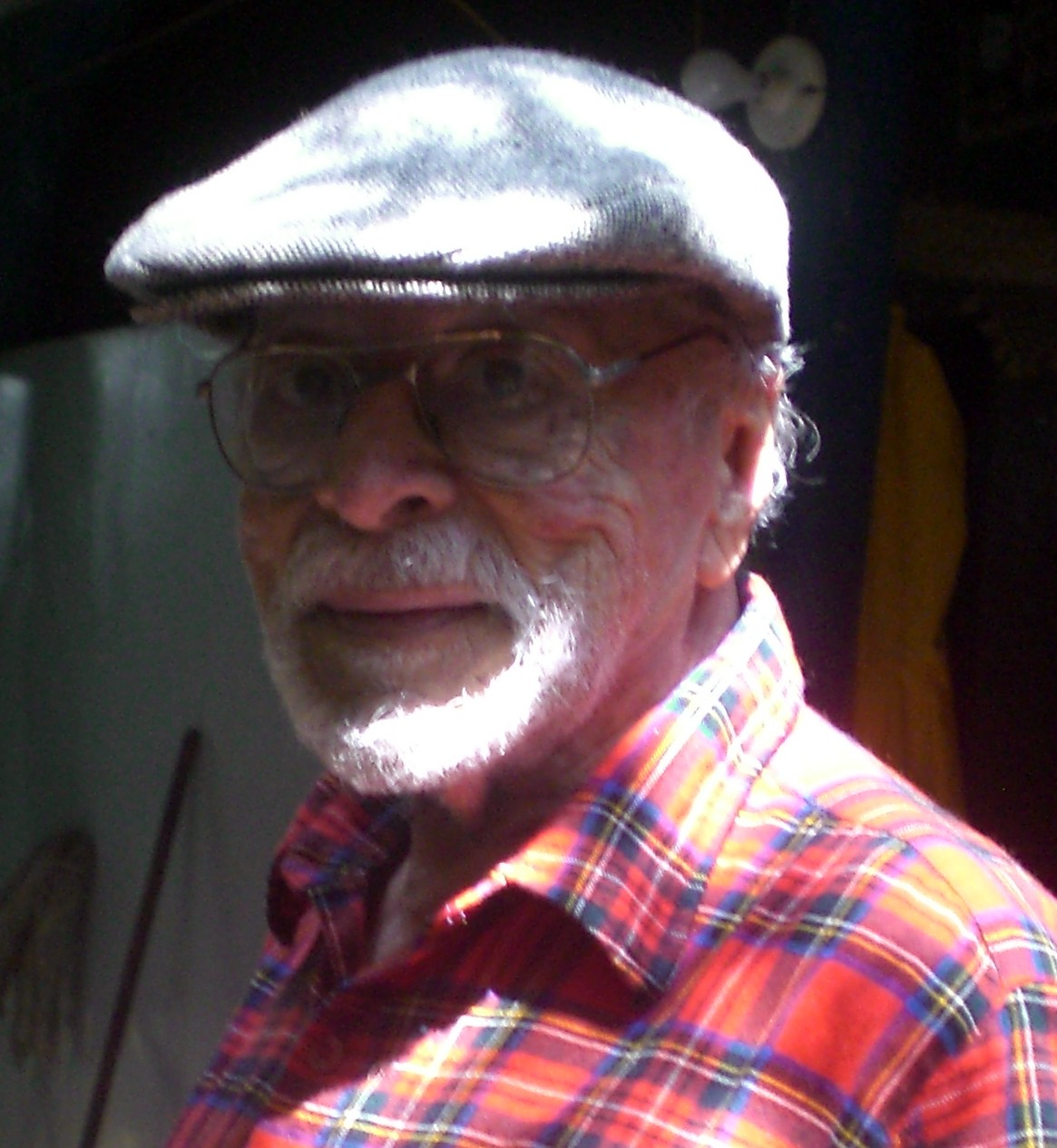
- Ocariz in 2013
- Born: José Humberto Ocariz Espinel; October 1, 1919; Las Dantas, Táchira, Venezuela
- Died: March 8, 2016 (aged 96); Mérida, Venezuela
- Education: University of the Andes; Central University of Venezuela (DMSc)
- Occupations: Physician; professor; writer; composer
- Spouse: Laura Chacín Soto de Ocariz
- Children: José Humberto and Milagro Ocariz Chacín

José Humberto Ocariz Espinel (October 1, 1919 – March 8, 2016) was a Venezuelan physician, university professor, writer, and musical composer. He was an early figure in the development of gastroenterology in Venezuela and introduced the use of laparoscopy techniques in the country. In 1956, he published a Spanish language manual on the subject.

== Early life ==
Ocariz was born at the "La Argelia" estate, near Las Dantas, in what is now the Bolívar Municipality of Táchira State. He completed his primary education in Rubio, and graduated from the Liceo Fermín Toro in Caracas in 1937. He studied medicine at the University of the Andes (ULA) and the Central University of Venezuela (UCV). At UCV, he earned his Doctorate in Medical Sciences in 1943, presenting the thesis "Obstetric Shock."

== Career ==
He began his career as a rural doctor in the town of La Azulita, Mérida, where he founded the "Tulio Febres Cordero" hospital. He later worked in Zea and Tovar. In 1945, he joined the Faculty of Medicine at the University of the Andes in Mérida as a professor of medical pathology and worked at the University Hospital of the Andes.

In 1953, he traveled to Europe for postgraduate studies, earning a diploma in 1955 from the School of Digestive Pathology at the Hospital de la Santa Creu i Sant Pau in Barcelona, Spain. In 1957, Ocariz established the Chair of Gastroenterology at the University Hospital of Mérida. In the early 1960s, he conducted further specialized studies in digestive pathology at institutions in Germany and the United Kingdom. He spent his entire academic career at ULA, reaching the rank of Full Professor, until his retirement.

== Writing and music ==
Ocariz wrote medicine, poetry, chronicles, and oratory. He has been described to be the originator of the term tachiraneidad to describe the cultural identity of the people of Táchira.

He published scientific papers in specialized journals. His published books include:

Title	Year
Manual de Laparoscopia	1956
Tornaviaje	1979
Molinos de Piedra	1981
Médicos Andinos	1986
Medicina y Política	1987 ISBN 9802211516
La Tachiranidad	1989
Apología del Engaño	1988
Medicina y Humanismo	1993
Autobiografía de un camino	1994 ISBN 9803290592
Crepusculares	2001
Atardecer	2001
Buenavista	2009

As a musical composer, his work includes bambucos, pasodobles, pasillos, and joropos. His music is part of the traditional Andean Venezuelan repertoire and has been recorded on several albums. His song "Entre tu mata de pelo" is featured in the film Candelas en la Niebla by director Alberto Arvelo.
