= San Antonio del Táchira =

Coordinates: 7°49′N 72°27′W

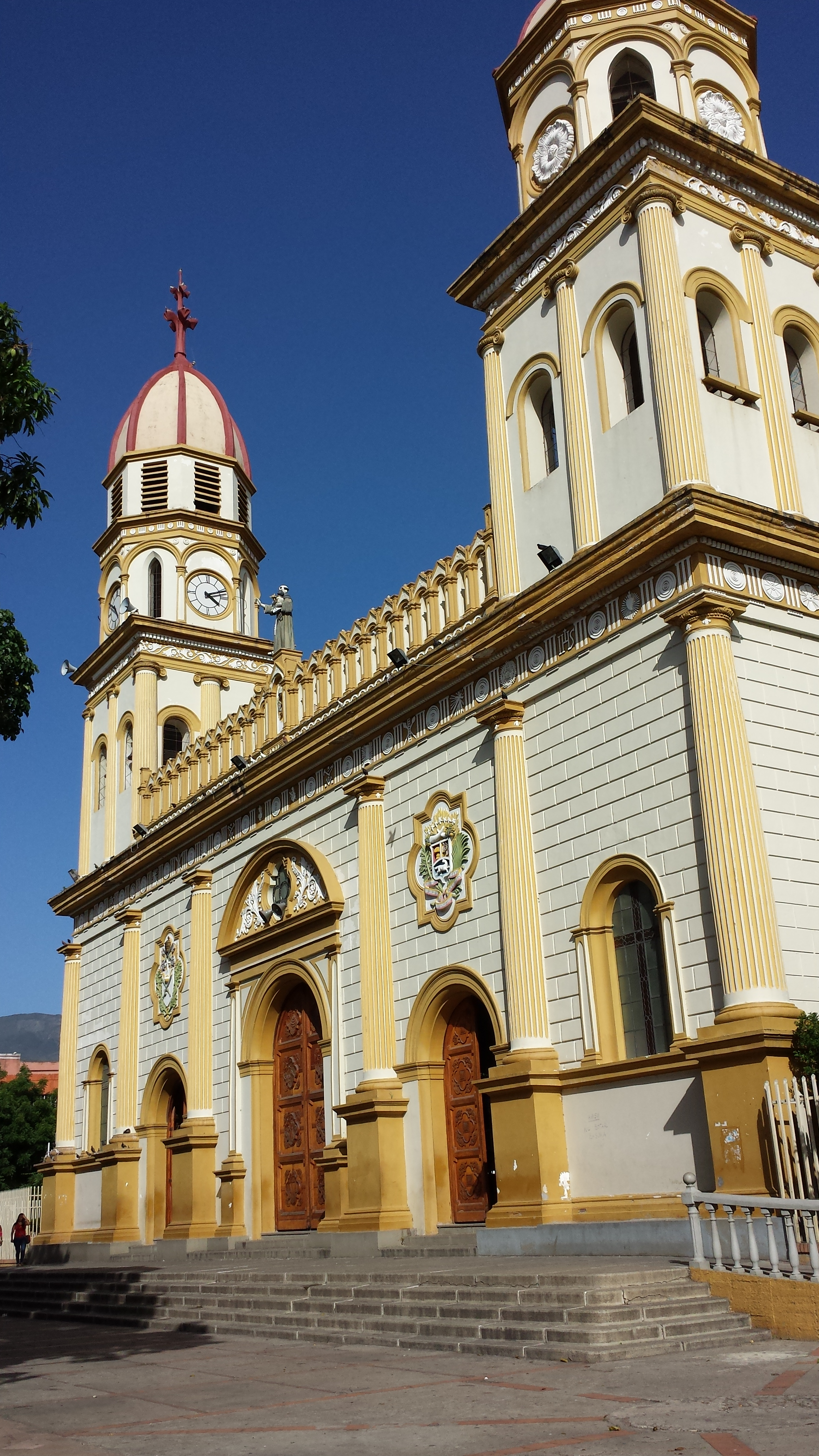

- Flag Coat of arms
- Interactive map of San Antonio del Táchira
- Country: Venezuela
- State: Táchira
- Municipality: Bolívar
- Founded: 1724

Government
  - Mayor: Simón Vargas MUD

Area
  - Total: 204 km^{2} (79 sq mi)
- Elevation: 802 m (2,631 ft)

Population (2011)
  - Total: 61,630
  - Density: 236.13/km^{2} (611.6/sq mi)
- Time zone: UTC−4 (VET)
- Area code: 0276
- Climate: BSh
- Website: bolivar-tachira.gob.ve
- The area and population figures are for the municipality

San Antonio del Táchira is a city in the Venezuelan Andean state of Táchira. The busy highway across the Simón Bolívar International Bridge linking the cities of Cúcuta, Colombia, and San Cristóbal, Venezuela, passes through San Antonio del Táchira, making it an important gateway between the two nations. This city is the shire town of the Municipio Bolívar de Táchira and, according to the 2001 Venezuelan census, the municipality has a population of 48,171.

== History ==
General Simón Bolívar passed through this city during his Admirable Campaign on March 1, 1813.

== Demographics ==
The Bolívar Municipality, according to the 2001 Venezuelan census, has a population of 48,171 (up from 39,752 in 1990). This amounts to 4.9% of Táchira's population. The municipality's population density is 611.6 people per square mile (236.13/km^{2}).

== Government ==
San Antonio del Táchira is the shire town of the Bolívar Municipality in Táchira. The mayor of the Bolívar Municipality is Juan Vicente Cañas Alviarez, elected in 2004 with 48% of the vote. He replaced Ramon Vivas shortly after the last municipal elections in October 2004.

== Economy ==
=== Transportation ===
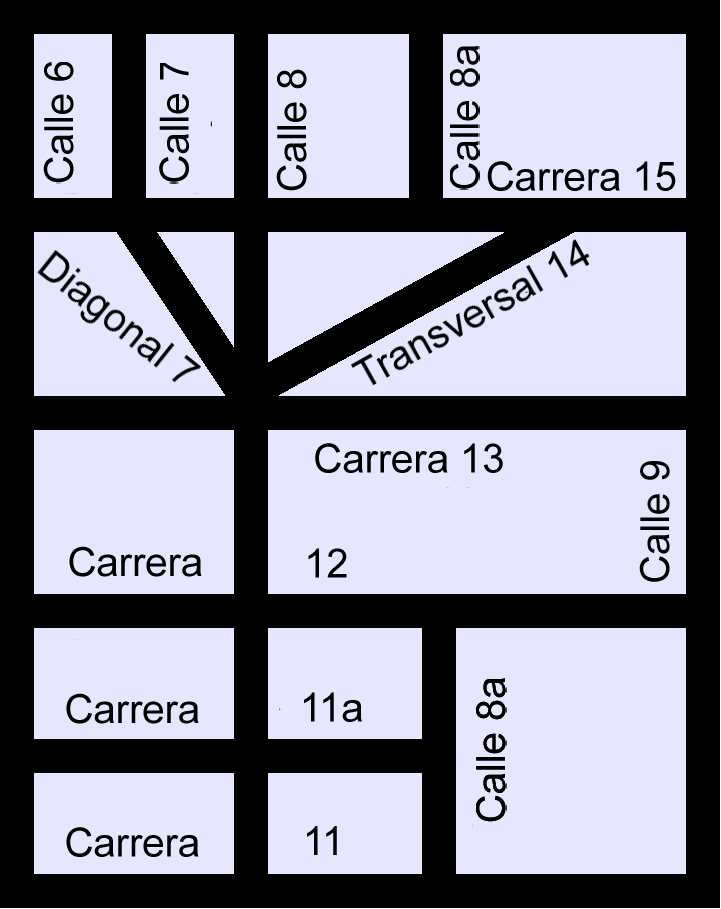
Street arrangement of San Antonio del Táchira based on the Cartesian coordinate system.

==== Airport ====
The city's airport, Juan Vicente Gómez International Airport, is located 2 kilometers northeast of the city.

==== Bridges ====
The Simón Bolívar International Bridge, crossing the Táchira River leads to Cúcuta in Colombia.

== Sites of interest ==
=== Squares and parks ===
- Plaza Bolívar (located between carreras 9 and 10 and calles 3 and 4)
- Plaza Miranda (located between carreras 12 and 13 and calles 4 and 5)

== Climate ==
Climate data for San Antonio Del Tachira (1971–2000)
Month	Jan	Feb	Mar	Apr	May	Jun	Jul	Aug	Sep	Oct	Nov	Dec	Year
Mean daily maximum °C (°F)	30.5 (86.9)	30.7 (87.3)	30.8 (87.4)	31.4 (88.5)	32.3 (90.1)	31.8 (89.2)	31.9 (89.4)	32.8 (91.0)	33.2 (91.8)	32.6 (90.7)	31.5 (88.7)	30.6 (87.1)	31.7 (89.0)
Mean daily minimum °C (°F)	20.6 (69.1)	20.9 (69.6)	21.4 (70.5)	22.0 (71.6)	22.9 (73.2)	23.3 (73.9)	23.0 (73.4)	23.1 (73.6)	22.7 (72.9)	22.1 (71.8)	21.5 (70.7)	20.8 (69.4)	22.0 (71.6)
Average precipitation mm (inches)	40.7 (1.60)	36.8 (1.45)	49.4 (1.94)	99.4 (3.91)	71.4 (2.81)	27.9 (1.10)	27.6 (1.09)	32.9 (1.30)	62.5 (2.46)	110.1 (4.33)	100.1 (3.94)	62.5 (2.46)	721.3 (28.39)
Average precipitation days (≥ 0.1 mm)	7.9	7.3	9.5	11.3	12.3	12.2	12.0	12.8	13.8	14.3	13.4	9.9	136.7
Source: World Meteorological Organization
