= Simón Bolívar Municipality, Anzoátegui =

Simón Bolívar Municipality Municipio Simón Bolívar
- Municipality
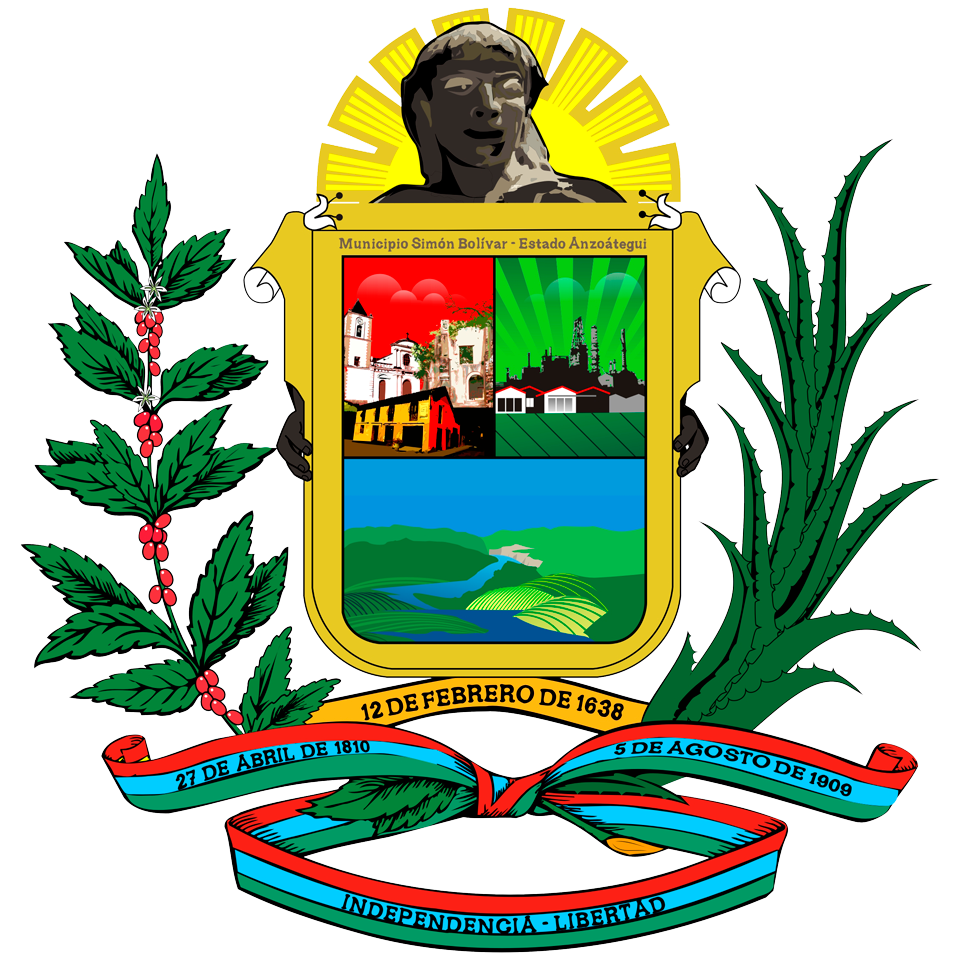
- Flag Coat of arms

- Location in Anzoátegui

- Location in Venezuela
- Coordinates: 10°00′58″N 64°36′18″W
- Country: Venezuela
- State: Anzoátegui
- Municipal seat: Barcelona

Government
  - Mayor: Sugey Herrera Mogollón (PSUV)

Area
  - Total: 1,855.9 km^{2} (716.6 sq mi)

Population (2011)
  - Total: 421,424
  - Density: 227.07/km^{2} (588.12/sq mi)
- Time zone: UTC−4 (VET)
- Area code(s): 0281
- Website: Official website

The Simón Bolívar Municipality is one of the 21 municipalities (municipios) that makes up the eastern Venezuelan state of Anzoátegui and, according to the 2011 census by the National Institute of Statistics of Venezuela, the municipality has a population of 421,424. The city of Barcelona is the shire town of the Simón Bolívar Municipality.

== Name ==
The municipality is one of several in Venezuela named "Simón Bolívar Municipality" in honour of Venezuelan independence hero Simón Bolívar.

== Demographics ==
The Simón Bolívar Municipality, according to a 2007 population estimate by the National Institute of Statistics of Venezuela, has a population of 428,391 (up from 378,285 in 2000). This amounts to 29.6% of the state's population. The municipality's population density is 251.11 inhabitants per square kilometre (650.4/sq mi).

== Government ==
The mayor of the Simón Bolívar Municipality is Inés Sifontes, elected on November 23, 2008 with 47% of the vote. She replaced José Pérez Fernández shortly after the elections. The municipality is divided into six parishes; El Carmen, San Cristóbal, Bergantín, Caigua, El Pilar, and Naricual.
