= Simón Bolívar Municipality =

Simón Bolívar Municipality may refer to the following places in Venezuela:

- Simón Bolívar Municipality, Anzoátegui
- Simón Bolívar, Miranda

== See also ==
- Bolívar Municipality (disambiguation)
