= United States–Venezuela Maritime Boundary Treaty =

1978 treaty between the United States and Venezuela

Maritime Boundary Treaty between the United States of America and the Republic of Venezuela Tratado de Límites Marítimos entre los Estados Unidos de América y la República de Venezuela
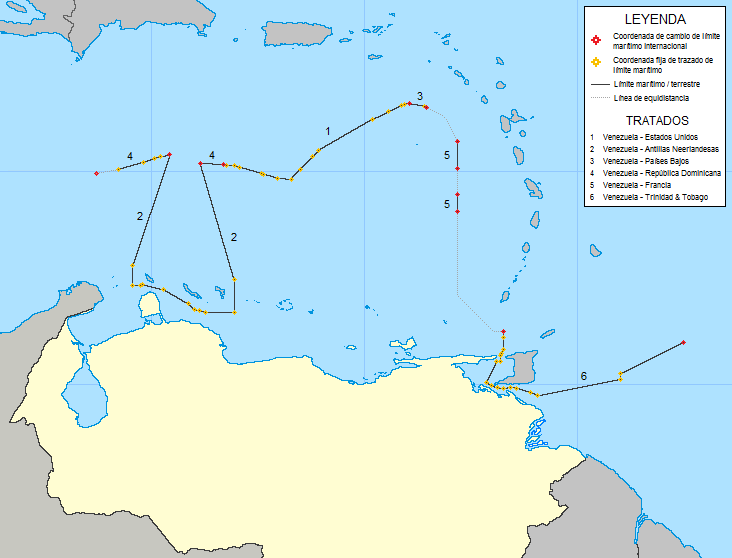
- Map showing the maritime borders between Venezuela, Puerto Rico and the United States Virgin Islands.
- Type: Boundary delimitation
- Signed: 28 March 1978
- Location: Caracas, Venezuela
- Effective: 24 November 1980
- Parties: United States; Venezuela
- Depositary: United Nations Secretariat
- Languages: English; Spanish

The United States–Venezuela Maritime Boundary Treaty is a 1978 treaty between the United States and Venezuela which delimits the maritime boundary between Venezuelan islands in the Caribbean Sea and the American territories of Puerto Rico and the United States Virgin Islands.

The treaty was signed in Caracas on 28 March 1978. The boundary set out by the text of the treaty is 298.7 nautical miles (553.2 km; 343.7 mi) long and consists of 21 maritime straight-line segments defined by 22 individual coordinate points. Two-thirds of the boundary is an equidistant line between the U.S. Virgin Islands and Aves Island. The far eastern point of the boundary is a tripoint with the Netherlands Antilles and the far western point is a quadripoint with the Netherlands Antilles and the Dominican Republic.

The treaty came into force on 24 November 1980 after it had been ratified by both states. The full name of the treaty is Maritime boundary Treaty between the United States of America and the Republic of Venezuela (Spanish: Tratado de Límites Marítimos entre los Estados Unidos de América y la República de Venezuela).

== See also ==
- Borders of Venezuela
- Netherlands–Venezuela Boundary Treaty
- United States–Venezuela relations
