= Simón Bolívar International Bridge =

Bridge connecting Colombia and Venezuela

Coordinates: 7.8179°N 72.4508°W

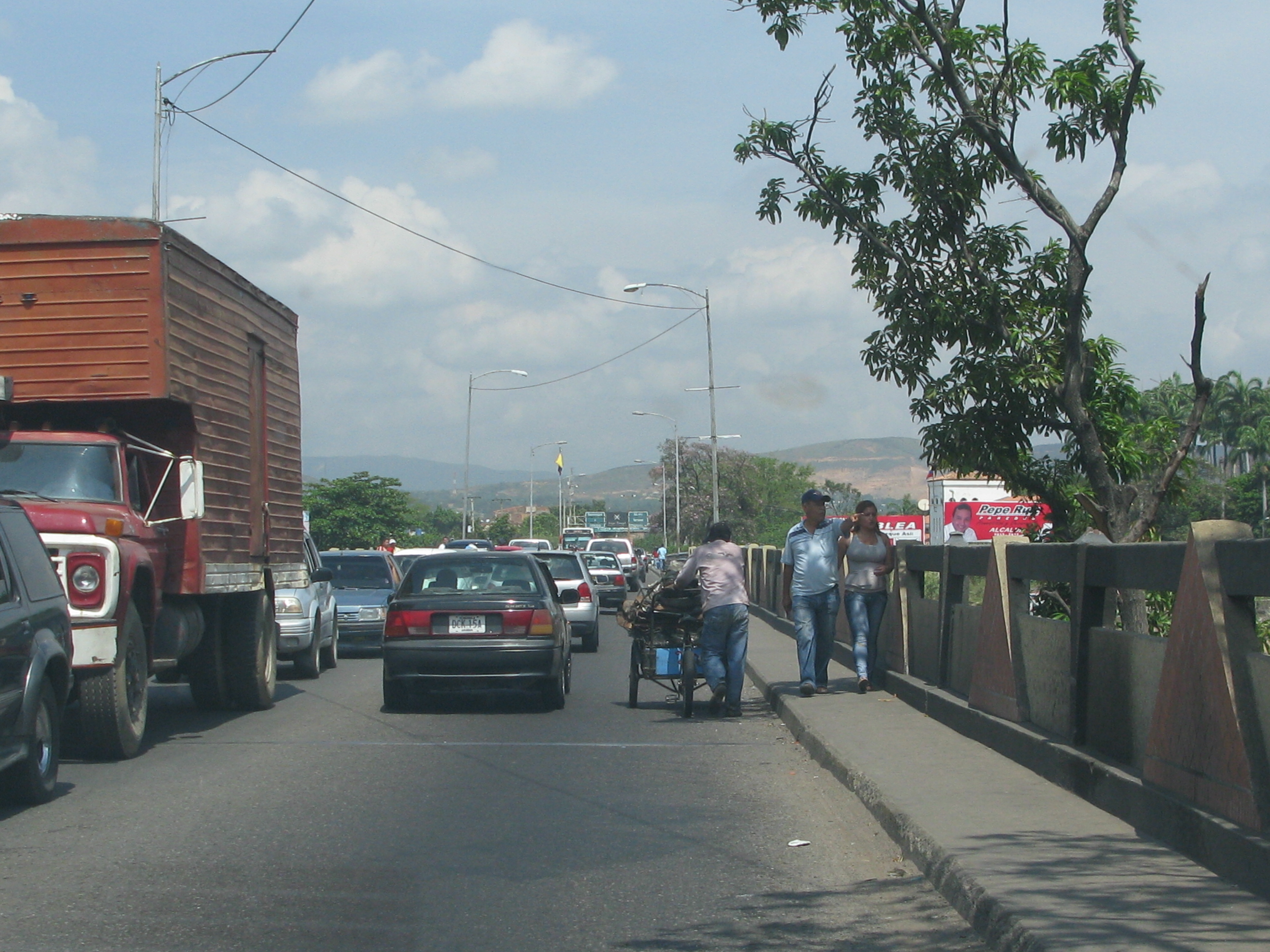
Two-way transport on the bridge in 2011

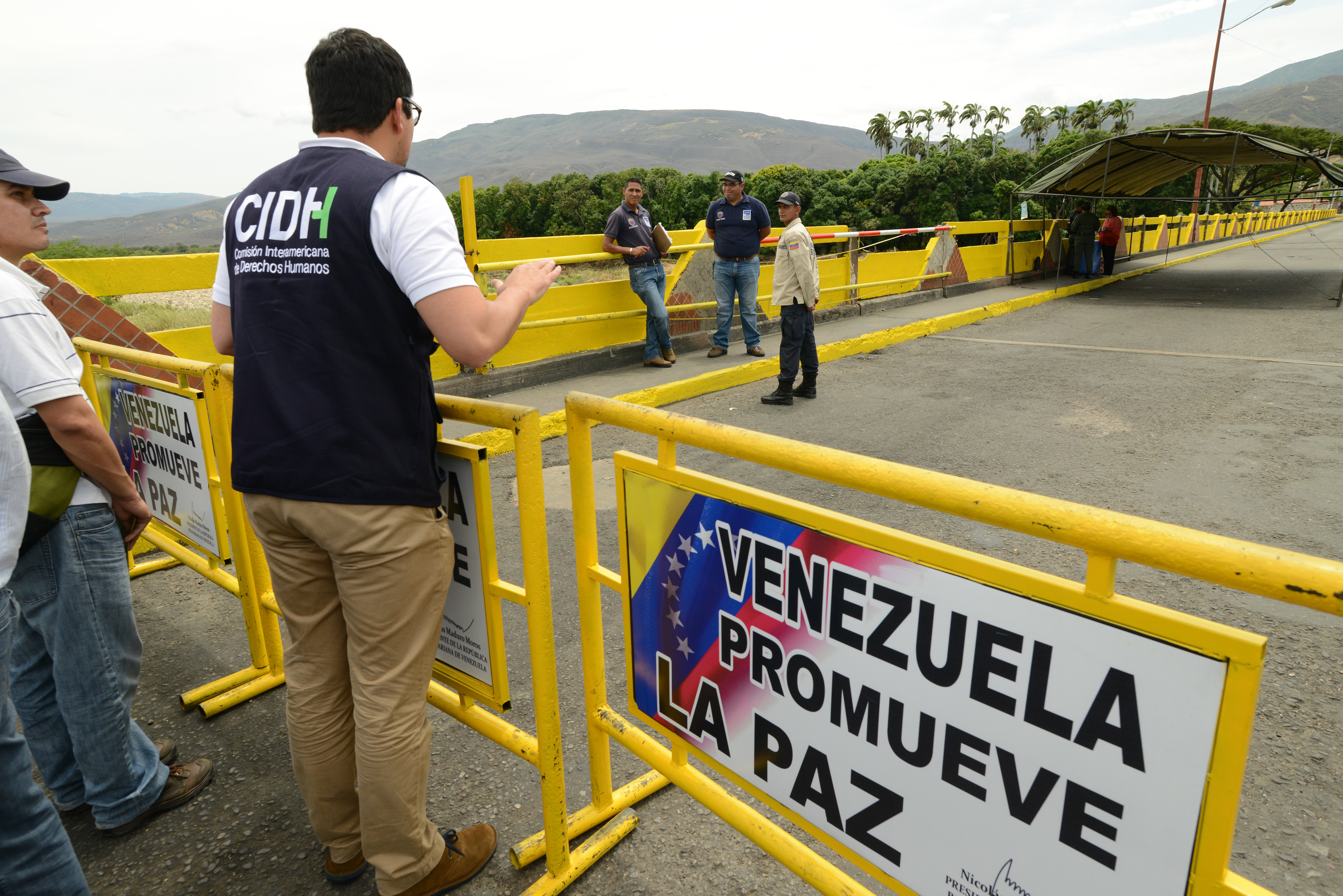
CIDH officials at the bridge in 2015

The Simón Bolívar International Bridge (Spanish: Puente Internacional Simón Bolívar) is a 300-metre-long (980 ft) bridge across the Táchira River on the Venezuela–Colombia border, connecting the city of San Antonio del Tachira in Venezuela with the small town of La Parada in Colombia. The first major city in Colombia after the border is Cúcuta.

Until the Venezuelan economic crisis, it was a popular crossing point for Colombians to shop across the border. In 2015, Venezuelan President Nicolás Maduro closed the bridge to vehicular traffic. Since at least 2017, the traffic is mostly people leaving Venezuela.
