= Bolivarian countries =

Six countries founded on Simón Bolívar's ideals

Bolivarian republics

The Bolivarian countries are six Hispanic American countries (Bolivia, Colombia, Ecuador, Panama, Peru and Venezuela) whose republican origin is attributed to the ideals of Simón Bolívar and the independence war led by the Venezuelan military in the viceroyalties of New Granada and Peru.

The links between these countries have come through economic alliances and international treaties such as the Andean Community, which since 1939 brought together those countries except Panama and included Chile and Venezuela. Cultural and sporting organizations have also forged ties between the Bolivarian countries, such as the Bolivarian Sports Organization, which has organized the Bolivarian Games every four years since 1938.

== History ==
Faithful to his ideals of American unity, with much effort Bolívar led the integration of three former entities of Spanish rule — the Viceroyalty of New Granada (currently Colombia and Panama), the Captaincy General of Venezuela (Venezuela), and Quito (Ecuador), led by Colonel José de Fabrega — into a single republic of Colombia, known historiographically as Gran Colombia.

The Independence of Panama from Spain was another of Bolívar's projects. The isthmus proclaimed its independence on November 28, 1821 and voluntarily joined Gran Colombia, due to the sympathy of the Isthmian leadership to Bolivarian ideals.

In 1824, Bolívar achieved military victories in the battles of Junín (August 6) and Ayacucho (December 9) over the royalist troops who dominated the Viceroyalty of Peru. He obtained the signature of the Spanish capitulation that recognized Peruvian independence. The struggle was initiated in 1821 by José de San Martín who declared independence and established the Republic of Peru.

Bolivia's independence struggle against Spain lasted from 1809 to 1825. Marshall Sucre called a Congress that declared absolute independence, gave it the name "Bolívar Republic", named Simón Bolívar its "Liberator" and offered him supreme political power, which he rejected. In 1826, Bolívar organized the Amphictyonic Congress, which sought to create a confederation of American countries in defense of the continent against the League of the Holy Alliance, by forming an army of 60,000 soldiers to defend themselves from Spain.

In 1830, member nations began to secede from Gran Colombia when Bolívar's dream of an American union declined, as did his life. After Venezuela and Ecuador decided to secede, Panama made the same decision on September 26, 1830. This situation continued until December 11 of that year, when under a gesture from Bolívar, it rejoined Gran Colombia. Bolívar died on December 17. After the dissolution of the union, Panama was part of the Republic of Colombia until its final separation on November 3, 1903. This was caused by Colombia's rejection of the Hay–Herrán Treaty, the crisis of Panama following the Thousand Days' War and United States intervention.

== See also ==
- Bolivarian Games
