= Bolívar Canton, Bolivia =

Canton of Bolívar Province, Bolivia

Bolívar Canton is one of the cantons of Bolívar Province, Bolivia.
