= Machu Tanka Tanka =

Mountain in Bolivia

- Location within Bolivia

Highest point
- Elevation: 4,866 m (15,965 ft)
- Coordinates: 18°04′34″S 66°42′45″W

Geography
- Location: Bolivia, Cochabamba Department, Bolívar Province
- Parent range: Andes

Machu Tanka Tanka (possibly from Quechua machu old, Aymara tanka hat and biretta of priests, the reduplication indicates that there is a group or a complex of something, "the old one with many hats", or Machu Tanqa Tanqa (Aymara tanqa tanqa beetle, "the old beetle") Hispanicized spelling Macho Tankha Tankha) is a 4,866-metre-high (15,965 ft) mountain in the Andes of Bolivia. It is situated in the Cochabamba Department, Bolívar Province. Machu Tanka Tanka lies northeast of the slightly lower mountain Wayna Tanka Tanka.
