= USS Bolivar =

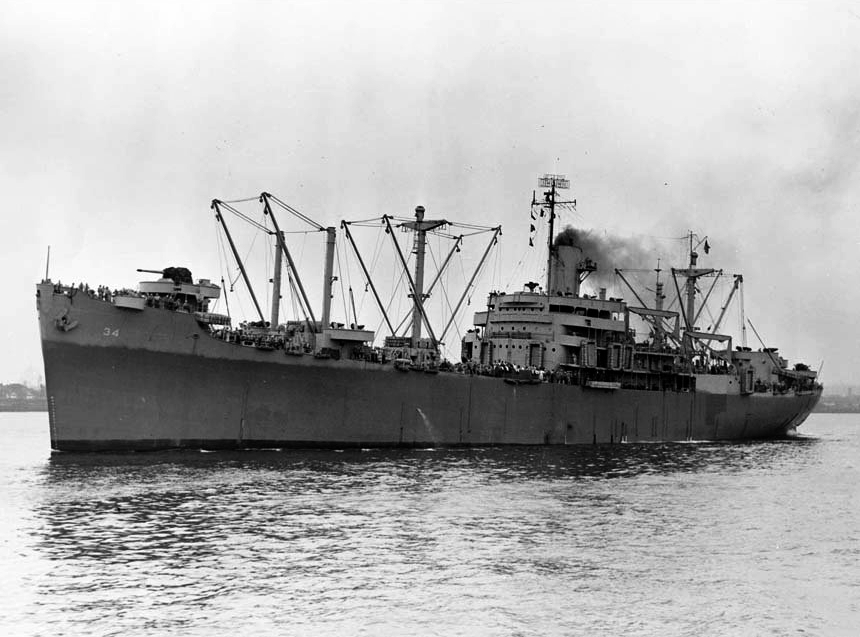

History

United States
- Name: USS Bolivar
- Namesake: Bolivar County, Mississippi
- Builder: Western Pipe & Steel
- Laid down: 13 May 1942
- Launched: 7 September 1942
- Christened: Sea Angel
- Commissioned: 15 March 1943
- Decommissioned: 29 April 1946
- Renamed: USS Bolivar, President Van Buren, President Harding, Thailand Bear, Santa Monica.
- Stricken: 19 July 1946
- Fate: Scrapped 1973

General characteristics
- Class & type: Bayfield-class attack transport
- Displacement: 11,760 tons
- Length: 492 ft (150 m)
- Beam: 69 ft 6 in (21.18 m)
- Draught: 26 ft 6 in (8.08 m)
- Speed: 18.4 kts
- Complement: 769 officers and enlisted
- Armament: 2 x 5 in (130 mm)/38 guns, 8 x 40 mm guns

USS Bolivar (APA-34) was a Bayfield-class attack transport in service with the United States Navy from 1943 to 1946. She was then sold into commercial service and was scrapped in 1973.

== History ==
Bolivar was named for Bolivar County, Mississippi. She was laid down on 13 May 1942 at San Francisco, California, by the Western Pipe and Steel Company under a Maritime Commission contract (MC hull 269); launched as SS Sea Angel on 7 September 1942; sponsored by Mrs. Robert W. Ethen; originally designated a transport, AP-79; reclassified APA-34 on 1 February 1943; transferred to the Navy on 15 March 1943; commissioned that same day, as Bolivar, moved to Hoboken, New Jersey; decommissioned there on 23 April; converted to an attack transport by Todd Shipbuilding Company; and recommissioned on 1 September.

=== Pacific War ===
On 12 September, Bolivar departed Hoboken and steamed to Norfolk, Virginia where she loaded boats and embarked troops for a month of training. The ship then returned north to take on a consignment of coffee and canned beef at Brooklyn for delivery to the West Coast. After joining a convoy off Norfolk on 13 October, Bolivar headed through the Panama Canal for San Pedro, California, where she arrived on 1 November.

On 14 November, Bolivar and five other attack transports began two months of training off San Clemente Island and Camp Pendleton. At the conclusion of the training, she embarked elements of the 3rd Marines and rehearsed the many phases of amphibious landings from loading and unloading troops and equipment, to various small boat landings and antiaircraft drills. On 20 December, Bolivar became flagship for the Commander, Transport Division (TransDiv) 28.

==== Kwajalein Atoll ====
On 13 January 1944, Bolivar steamed out of San Diego, California with TransDiv 28 bound for Hawaii and arrived at Pearl Harbor on the 21st. Her Hawaiian visit proved very brief because she got underway again the next day to take part in the invasion of the Marshall Islands. On 31 January, at the disembarkation area on the lee side of Kwajalein Atoll, Bolivar transferred elements of the 23d Marines that she carried to LSTs. The troops would be conveyed the following morning to the beaches of Roi for the main assault. In a little more than 26 hours, the Northern Attack Force under Rear Admiral Richard L. Conolly secured the northern part of Kwajalein Atoll, and Bolivar departed the lagoon on 8 February for Pearl Harbor. The attack transport spent the month of March training with the 2nd Marine Division for the assault on Saipan, and spent April and May in Pearl Harbor.

==== Marianas ====
On 30 May, Bolivar steamed out of Pearl Harbor with units of the 16th Marines embarked as part of Transport Group "Able" bound for Saipan in the Mariana Islands. TransDiv 28 stood off the beaches of Charan Kanoa early on 15 June, and Bolivar's first boats hit the beaches at 0844. The nine ships of TransDiv 18 and TransDiv 19 lost only 10 LCVP's and 4 LCM's during the landing. Bolivar remained in her transport area several miles offshore for three days disembarking troops and unloading equipment. On the 18th, she and the other auxiliaries received orders to head for a safe area east of Saipan where they remained until the Battle of the Philippine Sea was won on 20 June. She then returned to her transport area, embarked 295 casualties, and set sail for Pearl Harbor with her division.

At Pearl Harbor, Bolivar embarked a unit of the 306th Regimental Combat Team (RCT) of the Army's 77th Infantry Division and got underway for Guam on 9 July. She reached Guam on 22 July, the day after the landings, and remained there for a week disembarking reinforcement troops and unloading their equipment. She then headed back to Hawaii, arriving at Pearl Harbor on 10 August. After embarking a battalion of the Army's 383d Regiment, Bolivar rehearsed landing maneuvers at Maui, ostensibly for the invasion of Yap Island. The attack transport left Pearl Harbor on 15 September but, one day out of port, received orders cancelling the Yap campaign and directing Bolivar to Manus in the Admiralty Islands.

==== Philippines ====
Admiral Thomas C. Kinkaid's 7th Fleet was based at Manus where the invasion of Leyte was planned and staged. On 14 October, Bolivar stood out of Seeadler Harbor as part of Transport Group "Baker" of the Southern Attack Force headed for Leyte. At mid-morning on 20 October, Bolivar began disembarking troops from an anchorage in Leyte Gulf off Dulag. The attack transport did not get her full cargo unloaded by sunset, so she remained at anchor under a thick smokescreen. Bolivar completed her unloading the next day and, with her squadron, threaded her way through the aircraft defense smoke cover and headed south for Hollandia, New Guinea, carrying casualties to the Army hospital there.

Bolivar embarked reinforcements at Hollandia and sailed back to Leyte. She arrived on 18 November, and a kamikaze attack began almost as soon as she anchored. The attack transport witnessed one hit on Alpine, anchored about half a mile away, but Bolivar escaped attack. She quickly disembarked her troops, unloaded her cargo, and got underway the same day for Cape Torokina, Bougainville, where she took a battalion of the 37th Division on board.

The attack transport rehearsed landings of Huan Gulf, New Guinea, in preparation for the amphibious assault on Luzon at Lingayen. Bolivar headed for Lingayen Gulf on 31 December as part of Task Force (TF) 79. The transports arrived at their designated anchorages in lower Lingayen Gulf by 0700 on 9 January 1945, despite heavy enemy air attacks which crashed the aircraft carrier Kitkun Bay and narrowly missed the Australian ship HMAS Westralia in column to port of Bolivar.

At 0900, Bolivar's boats moved toward the beaches with the first assault wave. After unloading cargo and troops in a scant eight hours, the transport took on board badly wounded crewmen from the battleship California which had been hit by a kamikaze on 6 January. Cargo holds empty, the first echelon of transports, including Bolivar, left Lingayen Gulf at dusk through the smoke screen and the continuing air attacks. At Leyte, Bolivar transferred the wounded to the Dutch hospital ship HMNS Maetsuycher. She remained at Leyte until 19 January, when she weighed anchor and got underway for Ulithi. There, she took on fuel and provisions in preparation for embarking more troops.

==== Iwo Jima ====
On 6 February, Bolivar set out for Guam with a squadron of transports to embark elements of the 21st Marines. The convoy left Guam on 16 February and set course for the next stepping stone to Japan – Iwo Jima. The initial assault troops landed on 19 February, but Bolivar stood by off Iwo Jima holding her embarked troops in reserve. Finally, on the 21st, she commenced disembarkation, but high winds and other difficulties delayed the landing's completion until the 24th. Bolivar remained offshore receiving wounded soldiers for almost two weeks. On 3 March, one of her own crewmembers was killed and two others were wounded when a shell from an enemy shore battery exploded close aboard. Several night air attacks developed during her two-week stay, but Bolivar suffered no damage.

The attack transport left Iwo Jima on 6 March carrying 450 casualties to Saipan, where they were disembarked on 10 March. She left immediately for Nouméa, New Caledonia, where she arrived on 23 March.

==== Okinawa ====
The Army's 81st Infantry Division—billeted there as reserve for the Okinawa invasion—embarked in Bolivar, and she got underway on 9 April for landing rehearsals on the New Caledonian coast. After three days of maneuvers, the ship returned to Nouméa where she stood ready to answer the call for reinforcements at Okinawa. That word never came and, on 3 May, Bolivar left for Leyte, where she anchored on 16 May and disembarked her troops two days later.

After transferring her excess boats and provisions to other units, the attack transport set sail on 26 May for Apra Harbor, Guam. There she embarked 450 soldiers wounded at Okinawa and set course for Hawaii, an intermediate stop on the voyage back to the United States. She picked up 100 sailors at Pearl Harbor and arrived at Seattle, Washington, on 17 June. After transferring the casualties and other passengers and unloading ammunition, Bolivar made the short overnight run to Portland, Oregon, where she began a general overhaul at Kaiser Shipbuilding Corporation's Swan Island yard on the 18th.

==== Operation Magic Carpet ====
The war ended before the attack transport completed overhaul but, on 2 September, she put to sea as part of the Operation Magic Carpet fleet returning veterans from the Philippines, Marshall, Admiralty, and Caroline Islands. Returning to San Francisco on 29 January 1946, Bolivar discharged her passengers and proceeded to the New York Naval Shipyard in Brooklyn, New York, via the Panama Canal Zone and Norfolk, Virginia.

==== Decommissioning and fate ====
On 29 April 1946, Bolivar was decommissioned, and her name was struck from the Navy List on 19 July 1946. The transport was returned to the Maritime Commission on 12 September 1946. The ship was initially leased by American President Lines, Ltd., and subsequently by several other companies, before disappearing from mercantile records in 1973.

== Awards ==
Bolivar received five battle stars for her service during World War II.
