= Bolívar, Uruguay =

Bolívar
- Village
- Location in Uruguay
- Coordinates: 34°13′59″S 55°43′59″W
- Country: Uruguay
- Department: Canelones Department

Population (2011)
  - Total: 139
- Time zone: UTC -3
- Postal code: 91401
- Dial plan: +598 4311 (+4 digits)

Bolívar is a village in Canelones Department, Uruguay.

== Geography ==
=== Location ===
The village is located on the banks of Santa Lucía River, along Route 7 and about 75 kilometres (47 mi) northeast of Montevideo.

== History ==
On 4 February 1886, it was declared a "Pueblo" (village) by Decree.

== Population ==
In 2011 Bolívar had a population of 139.

Year	Population
1963	110
1975	107
1985	100
1996	152
2004	94
2011	139

Source: Instituto Nacional de Estadística de Uruguay
