= Sirk'i (Cochabamba) =

Mountain in Bolivia

- Location within Bolivia

Highest point
- Elevation: 4,442 m (14,573 ft)
- Coordinates: 17°56′19″S 66°27′07″W

Geography
- Location: Bolivia, Cochabamba Department
- Parent range: Andes

Sirk'i (Aymara for wart, also spelled Serkhe) is a 4,442-metre-high (14,573 ft) mountain in the Bolivian Andes. It is located in the Cochabamba Department, in the east of the Bolívar Province. Sirk'i lies southeast of Jach'a Khuchi.
