= Bolívar (footballer, born 1954) =

Brazilian footballer

Personal information
- Full name: Bolívar Modualdo Guedes
- Date of birth: 21 December 1954 (age 71)
- Place of birth: Porto Alegre, Brazil
- Height: 1.83 m (6 ft 0 in)
- Position: Defender

Youth career
- 1970–1972: Avenida

Senior career*
Years	Team	Apps	(Gls)
1972–1976	Grêmio	111	(5)
1977–1980	Portuguesa		
1981–1989	Inter de Limeira		
1984	→ Aimoré (loan)		
1988	→ Bragantino (loan)		
1990	Guarani-VA		
1991	Bandeirante		
1991	Avenida		

International career
1972–1973	Brazil Olympic		
- * Club domestic league appearances and goals

Bolívar Modualdo Guedes (born 21 December 1954), known as Bolívar, is a Brazilian former footballer who played as a midfielder. He competed in the men's tournament at the 1972 Summer Olympics.
