= Bolívar Municipality, Barinas =

Bolívar Municipality Municipio Bolívar
- Municipality
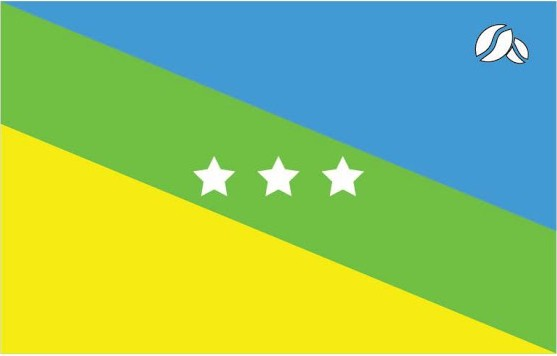
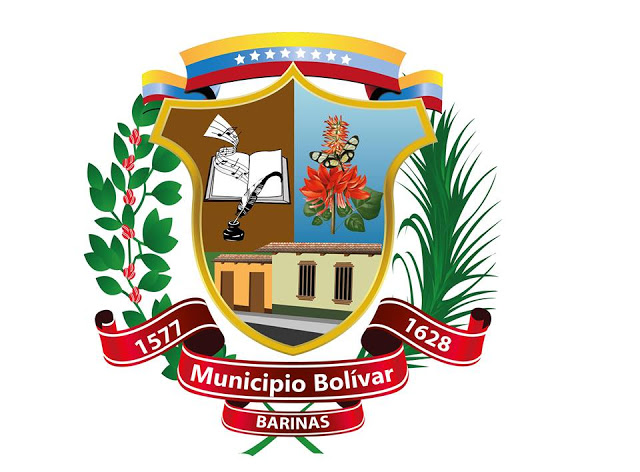
- Flag Coat of arms

- Location in Barinas

- Location in Venezuela
- Coordinates: 8°47′39″N 70°30′32″W
- Country: Venezuela
- State: Barinas
- Municipal seat: Barinitas

Government
  - Mayor: Mayra Jaramillo Morales (PSUV)

Area
  - Total: 1,135.2 km^{2} (438.3 sq mi)

Population (2007)
  - Total: 47,878
  - Density: 42.176/km^{2} (109.23/sq mi)
- Time zone: UTC−4 (VET)
- Area code(s): 0273

Bolívar Municipality is one of the 12 municipalities (municipios) that makes up the Venezuelan state of Barinas and, according to a 2007 population estimate by the National Institute of Statistics of Venezuela, the municipality has a population of 47,878. The town of Barinitas is the shire town of the Bolívar Municipality.

== Name ==
The municipality is one of several in Venezuela named "Bolívar Municipality" in honour of Venezuelan independence hero Simón Bolívar.

== Demographics ==
The Bolívar Municipality, according to a 2007 population estimate by the National Institute of Statistics of Venezuela, has a population of 47,878 (up from 40,863 in 2000). This amounts to 6.3% of the state's population. The municipality's population density is 45.7 inhabitants per square kilometre (118/sq mi).

== Government ==
The mayor of the Bolívar Municipality is Iván Dario Maldonado, elected on October 31, 2004, with 49% of the vote. He replaced Alberto Melean shortly after the elections. The municipality is divided into three parishes; Barinitas, Altamira, and Calderas.
