= Bolivar Arellano =

Ecuadorian-American photographer and businessman (born 1944)

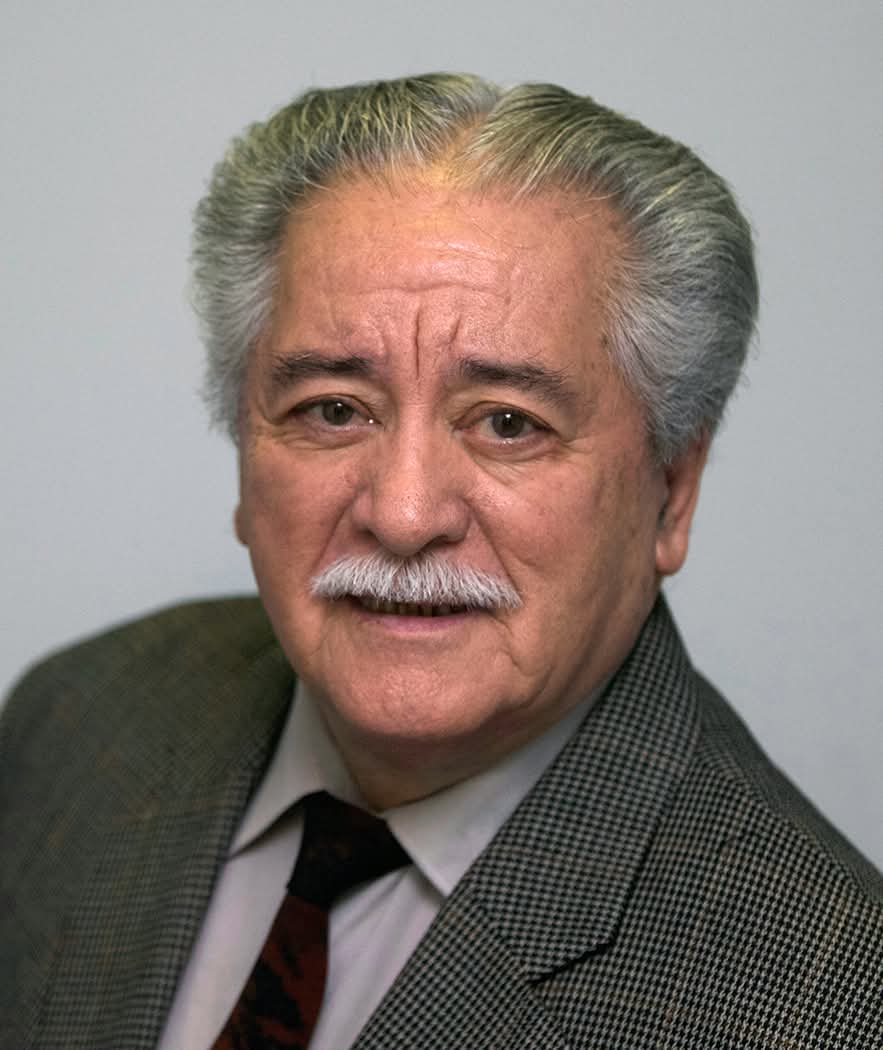
- Arellano in 2025
- Pronunciation: bo-lee-var
- Born: September 3, 1944 (age 82); Alausi, Ecuador
- Citizenship: American
- Occupations: Retired activist-photojournalist & businessman
- Years active: 1963–2004
- Notable work: September 11th: Through the Eyes of Photographer Bolivar Arellano
- Spouse: Brunilda Arellano
- Awards: 2003 Kenneth P. McLaughlin Award of Merit

Bolivar Arellano (born 3 September 1944 in Alausi, Chimborazo Province, Ecuador) is an Ecuadorian-American photographer and former shop owner. He photographed the Puerto Rican boy band Menudo and took photos during the September 11 attacks in New York City.

== Career ==
Arellano arrived in New York from Ecuador on 12 May 1971. That same year, he met and had a photo taken with Muhammad Ali, then a former and future two-time world heavyweight champion boxer. In 1974, he was hired by Spanish language newspaper El Diario La Prensa, where he worked at as a freelance photographer until 1993. Arellano had been a victim of persecution in Ecuador, where he ran afoul of the military. When he arrived in New York, he was helped by a friend back in Ecuador who was a reporter for The Associated Press and sent him a letter of introduction, which Arellano used to meet and hang out with English-speaking photographers. He was soon hired by El Diario, but while at that newspaper's offices, he noticed that they did not have a police scanner. Arellano bought one and soon, he was covering crime news for the paper as a photographer.

One of his first experiences in New York was witnessing the beating of a member of the Young Lords, a Puerto Rican independence political organization, by a policeman after the member had shouted "Long live free Puerto Rico!" Arellano credited that incident with helping him gain an affinity for Puerto Rico and its people, which he kept for the rest of his life.

Many Latin politicians reached out to Arellano; one of them, Herman Badillo, told him that he and other Latin politicians were going to the White House to meet with President Jimmy Carter during a 1977 trip to Washington D.C. and asked Arellano if he wanted to come along. Arellano flew to Washington, D.C. and took photos of the president.

Arellano later worked for the Associated Press. He was sent to several countries in Central America and took photos of many things, including war, poverty and atrocities, such as the civil war and a massacre in El Salvador and unrest in Nicaragua, where he was abducted for three days by the Contras.

In 1986, Arellano became an American citizen.

=== Menudo ===
By 1983, at the age of 39, he was living in New York with his wife, Brunilda. Arellano knew, Manolo "Manolito" Rodriguez, who was the New York City promoter both of Iris Chacon and of Menudo. The Arellanos were freelance photographers at the time and in February of that year, when Menudo was coming to New York for a concert, they went to John F. Kennedy International Airport to photograph the group, but the large number of fans there to welcome Menudo made it difficult for them to do so. So the Arellanos then went to the hotel where the group was going to stay at.

Thanks to their friend Rodriguez, the Arellanos gained access to the band and followed them for ten days as they stayed at the hotel, toured Central Park and did concerts. The pictures the Arellanos took of the band were for reselling and the couple placed an ad on a New York newspaper announcing that they had Menudo pictures for sale to fans, along with the Arellanos' phone number, and the next day after the ad was printed in the newspaper, the Arellanos received hundreds of phone calls by Menudo fans. This prompted Bolivar to come with an idea of traveling to Puerto Rico to get in contact with Menudo manager Edgardo Diaz.

Diaz gave the Arellanos permission to set a store in New York to sell Menudo merchandise. The Arellanos named the store Menuditis, which was a word used by reporters to describe the frenzy Menudo caused on their fans, like Beatlemania. The Arellanos started traveling to Puerto Rico for concerts, entirely covering airfare and hotels for fans. The store was a success; and it was visited by such Menudo members as Ricky Martin, Ricky Melendez, Johnny Lozada, Sergio Gonzalez, Ruben Gomez, Roy Rossello, Charlie Masso, Ray Reyes, Raymond Acevedo, Robby Rosa and Miguel Cancel.

In 1991, Arellano returned to Puerto Rico, this time to testify about alleged abuses committed by Menudo management in a Carmen Jovet television show. Arellano alleged at Jovet's television show, "Controversial," that nine members of Menudo had been sexually assaulted while in the band. When asked by whom they had been assaulted, Arellano pointed at Diaz, Menudo lawyer Orlando Lopez and Menudo Panama's holding company owner, José Antonio Jimenez. Arellano was accompanied by former Menudo Ralphy Rodriguez at that show, during which the Puerto Rican police tried to intervene and shut it down.

Eventually, feeling bad by what allegedly happened at Menudo, Arellano decided to shut down his store. In 2023, Arellano spoke about his experiences with Menudo to the Telemundo channel.

=== 1993 World Trade Center bombing ===
Arellano took photos of the World Trade Center after the attack on it in 1993.

=== 9/11 ===
Arellano arrived on "Ground Zero" on 11 September 2001, in New York, to take pictures after American Airlines Flight 11 had crashed into the World Trade Center. He later witnessed the crash of United Airlines Flight 175 into the same place. According to Arellano, one of the worst things he saw was thirteen people jumping from the burning buildings after the crashes.

Arellano, who had originally been covering a political event on that morning, suffered a deep cut on his right knee after the collapse of the south tower that day; he was photographed by Matthew McDermott, another photographer. Due to his injuries, Arellano required hospitalization. Seeing dead bodies and also people jumping off also caused him mental anguish that lasted for years.

Arellano took a photo of the South Tower just after the United jet crashed into it.

== Exhibitions ==
Arellano has had his photos exhibited at various times, including in 1984 at the Museum of Modern Art.

In 1997, Arellano opened the Bolivar Arellano Gallery in the East Village of New York City. After 10 years of operation, the gallery closed its doors on September 30, 2007.

In 2015, Arellano opened another exhibition, this time at Columbia University, which displays 20 of his black-and-white photos.

In 2017, Arellano hosted a three-day photo exhibit at the Julia De Burgos Performance & Arts Center from June 14 to 16. Titled "Puerto Rican Rebels," the exhibit featured photographs of key Puerto Rican activists like Oscar Lopez Rivera and William Morales.

== Book ==
On 12 September 2006, Arellano released a book with photos taken at Ground Zero, titled "September 11th: Through The Eyes of Photographer Bolivar Arellano."

== See also ==
- List of Ecuadorians
