= Bolivar, Georgia =

Unincorporated community in Georgia, U.S.

Coordinates: 34°22′11″N 84°42′42″W

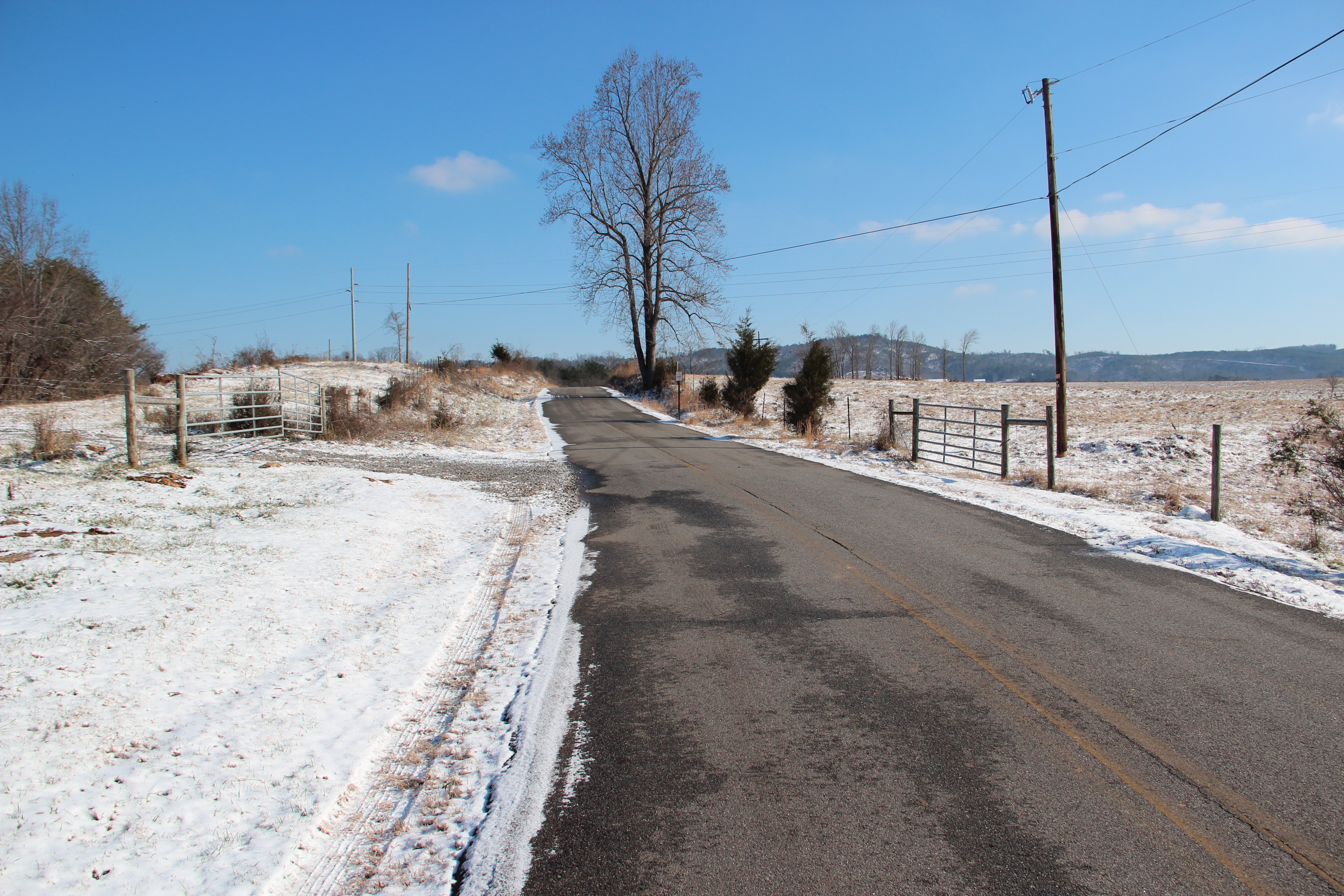
Johnson Mountain Road in Bolivar

Bolivar is an unincorporated community in Bartow County, in the U.S. state of Georgia.

== History ==
Bolivar had its start as a depot on the Louisville and Nashville Railroad. A post office called Bolivar was established in 1888, and closed in 1901. The community was named for Simón Bolívar, a Venezuelan statesman and military leader who led several South American nations to independence from the Spanish Empire.
