= Wayna Tanka Tanka =

Mountain in Bolivia

- Location within Bolivia

Highest point
- Elevation: 4,858 m (15,938 ft)
- Coordinates: 18°06′55″S 66°43′30″W

Geography
- Location: Bolivia, Cochabamba Department, Bolívar Province
- Parent range: Andes

Wayna Tanka Tanka (possibly from Quechua wayna young, Aymara tanka hat and biretta of priests, the reduplication indicates that there is a group or a complex of something, Tanka Tanka a neighboring mountain, "young Tanka Tanka" or "the young one with many hats", or Wayna Tanqa Tanqa (Aymara tanqa tanqa beetle, "young Tanqa Tanqa" or "the young beetle") Hispanicized spelling Huayna Tankha Tankha) is a 4,858-metre-high (15,938 ft) mountain in the Andes of Bolivia. It is situated in the Cochabamba Department, Bolívar Province, near the border with the Potosí Department. Wayna Tanka Tanka lies southwest of the slightly higher mountain Machu Tanka Tanka.
