= Isla de Aves =

Venezuelan uninhabited islet in the eastern Caribbean Sea

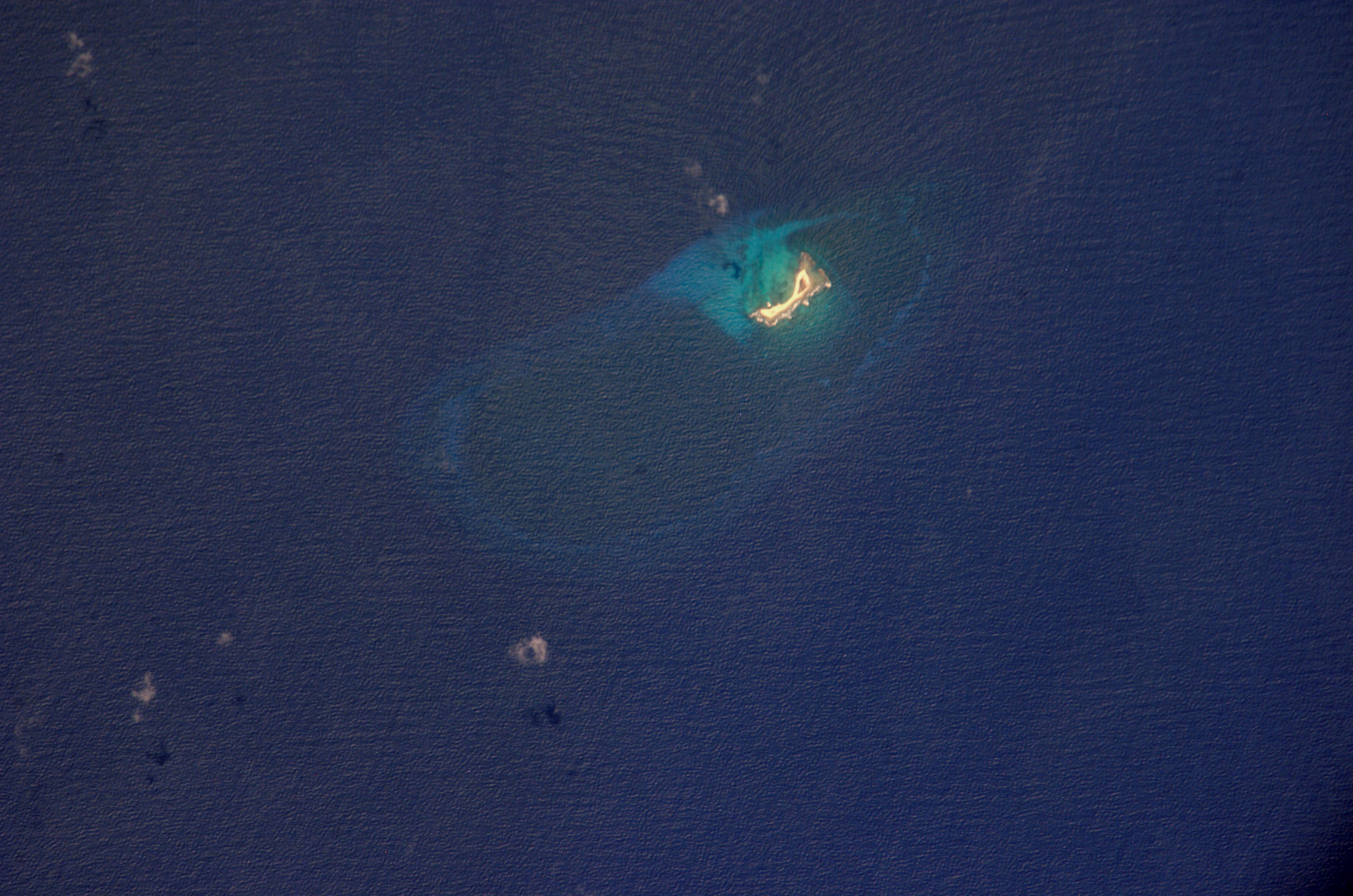
- Isla de Aves from space, 2001

- Location in the Caribbean

Geography
- Location: Caribbean Sea
- Coordinates: 15°40′12″N 63°37′7″W
- Length: 376 m (1234 ft)
- Width: 50 m (160 ft)
- Highest elevation: 4 m (13 ft)

Administration
- Venezuela
- Federal Dependencies of Venezuela

Isla de Aves ([ˈisla ðe ˈaβes]; Spanish for "Island of Birds" or "Birds Island"), or Aves Island, is a Federal Dependency of Venezuela.

Possessing valuable guano deposits, the island has been the subject of numerous territorial disputes (now resolved) with the United States (through the Guano Islands Act of 1856), neighbouring independent island countries such as Dominica, and European states controlling their nearby dependent island territories, such as the Kingdom of the Netherlands and the United Kingdom. The sovereignty of Venezuela over the island was eventually internationally recognized.

== Geography ==
The island is a part of the Aves Ridge and lies to the west of the Windward Islands chain. It is 375 m (1,230 ft) in length and never more than 50 m (160 ft) in width, and rises 4 m (13 ft) above the sea on a calm day. Its area is estimated at 3.36 ha 8.3 acres although some sources mention figures ranging from 0.65 ha to 4.5 ha (1.6 acres to 11.12 acres), varying according to erosion. Depending on one's interpretation of the United Nations Convention on the Law of the Sea, it could be legally classified as a "rock", which would only give Venezuela a twelve nautical mile economic zone. However, Venezuela claims it is a normal island, which grants it a 200 nmi (370 km) exclusive economic zone. It is sometimes completely submerged during hurricanes. It is 185 km (115 mi) south-west of the closest land, Montserrat, 225 km (140 mi) west of Dominica and 547 km (340 mi) north of the Venezuelan mainland.

=== Environment ===
Mostly sand, a small portion of Isla de Aves has some scrubby vegetation. It is a resting and breeding place for seabirds and a nesting site for green sea turtles. The island, along with its surrounding waters, has been designated an Important Bird Area (IBA) by BirdLife International because it supports significant populations of brown noddies and sooty terns.

=== Impact of hurricanes ===
The island's low profile makes it a hazard to navigation, and many ships have been wrecked here. It is sometimes completely submerged during hurricanes. For some time the island has been in danger of eroding altogether, and Venezuelan authorities are considering ways to protect it, along with the territorial claims to the Caribbean Sea which radiate from Isla de Aves. The impact of Hurricane Allen in the 1980 Atlantic hurricane season divided it into two parts, but accretions of coral have subsequently reunited it. On August 17, 2007, the force of Hurricane Dean severely eroded the island.

== History ==
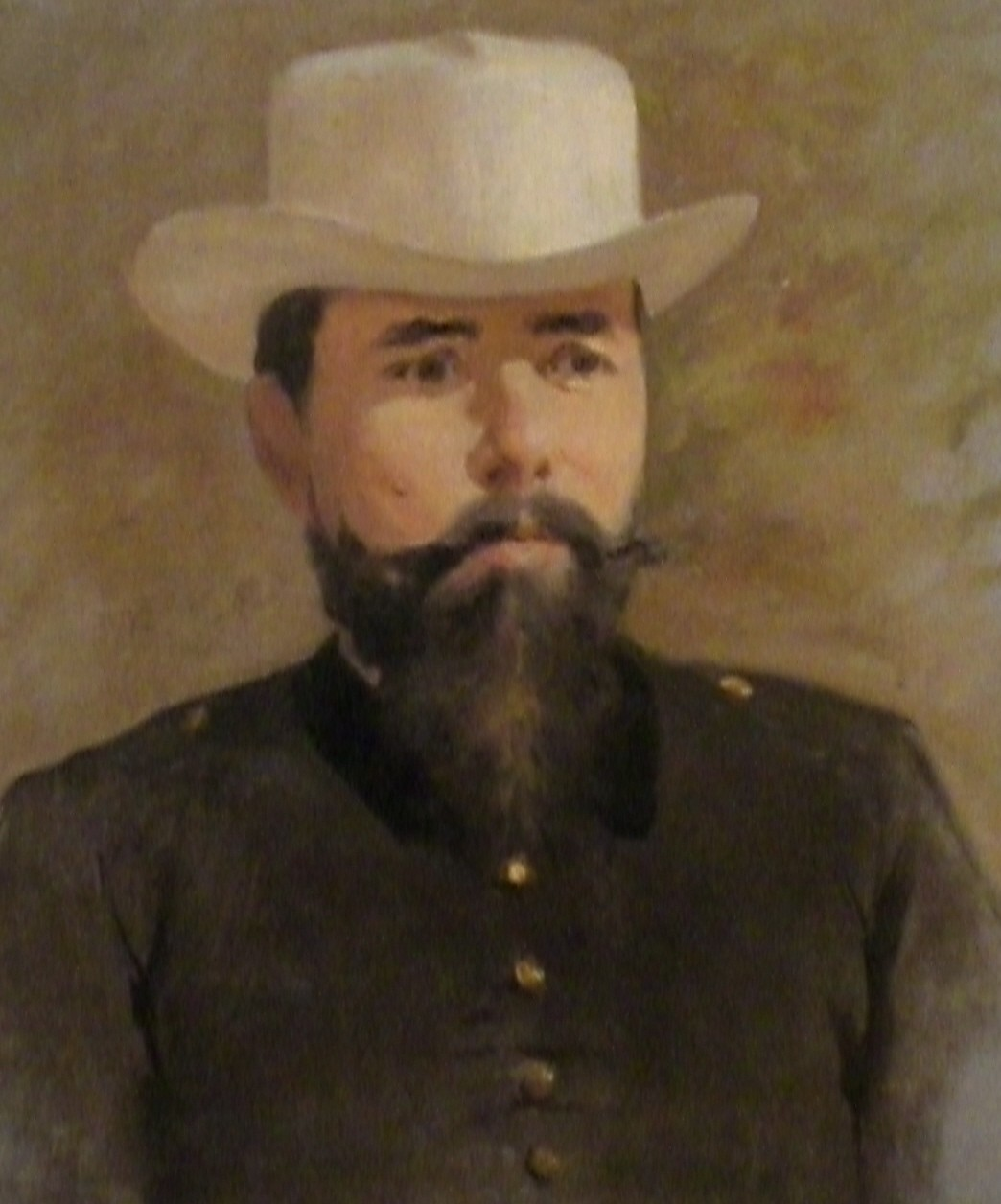
Isla de Aves was included in Venezuela's territorial reorganization done by President Joaquín Crespo in 1895.

The island was most likely discovered by Avaro Sanzze in 1584, though it was not settled. It was subsequently claimed for Great Britain, Spain, Portugal and the Netherlands. Throughout the 17th, 18th and 19th centuries, the inhabitants of the Dutch islands Sint Eustatius and Saba regularly visited Aves to collect turtle and bird eggs.

The Netherlands laid claim to it starting in 1854, seeking to declare it united with the island of Saba, located 200 km away. The same year a U.S. captain discovered the abundant quantities of guano on Aves and systematic collection started not long after. Both the Dutch and Venezuelan authorities found out and protested. The Dutch sent a warship to Aves. Its captain found Americans loading guano. He informed them that the Dutch considered Aves to belong to the Netherlands.

The government of general Jose Gregorio Monagas dispatched two warships at command of Colonel Domingo Diaz to claim the sovereignty of Venezuela on the Aves island. In March 1856, the Dutch decided to dispatch a fleet of three warships to the port of La Guaira, while also issuing an ultimatum to the Venezuelan government to respond to their demands regarding the sovereignty of the island, as well as to “negotiate” the terms of the alleged indemnities for the Jews expelled from Coro.

The island was once again involved in controversy in 1857 when three Boston men, "Mesers Shelton, Samson and Tappan", were in a dispute with the Venezuelan government after they "annexed" the island "which they had discovered in an abandoned condition"; this was done in accordance with the recently passed United States Guano Islands Act.

In the meantime, in 1859, the Administrator of Sint Eustatius granted a concession to collect guano on Aves to ‘Edward Green, Kean & Co.’ of Baltimore at f. 2.50 per ton. He decided that “even though Aves was never permanently settled by the Dutch, the inhabitants of Statia and Saba had made use of the island longer than anyone can remember,” which “constituted proof of possession.” He gave a provisionary concession and asked the Governor in Curaçao to confirm. The Governor, meanwhile, had received a request to mine guano on Aves from a group of businessmen on Dutch Sint Maarten, “who had assured themselves that Aves was recognized as a possession of the Dutch government.”

The Dutch authorities on Curaçao, under whom Sint Eustatius and Saba fell, sat down with the Venezuelans and together decided to find a mutually acceptable sovereign to decide about the ownership of Aves Island. The Queen of Spain was accepted by both parties, and in 1865 Isabella II ruled on the issue, deciding in favor of the Venezuelans.

However, Isabella's judgment acknowledged the time-honoured rights of the inhabitants of the Dutch islands Saint Eustatius, Saba and Sint Maarten to fish in the waters around Aves. As this was the main issue the Dutch had, they accepted the ruling. Later, some Dutch historians argued that Isabella's advisors could have mixed up Aves with Las Aves Archipelago lying between Bonaire and Los Roques, just off the coast of Venezuela.

From 1878 to 1912, the island was again occupied by American guano miners until supplies were exhausted.

Isla de Aves was included in Venezuela's territorial reorganization done by President Joaquín Crespo in 1895. By 1905, Isla de Aves was a municipality called "Municipio Oriental" part of Colón Federal Territory.

In 1950, a Venezuelan Navy fleet consisting of two patrol boats and one transport boat were sent to take control of the island with a group of soldiers.

On June 2, 1978, ships of the Venezuelan Navy were sent to set up a scientific naval base named Simón Bolívar on the lee (west) side near the southern tip of the island, constructed as a platform built on stilts partially in the water, which was permanently inhabited by a group of scientists and military personnel.

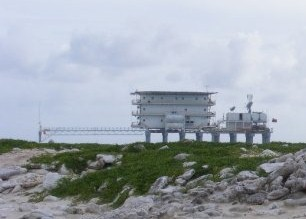
Scientific naval base Simón Bolívar on Isla de Aves – Venezuela

=== United States–Venezuela Maritime Boundary Treaty ===
On March 28, 1978, Venezuela, using Aves Island as its reference, agreed to its maritime borders with the U.S. between Aves Island and Puerto Rico in the United States–Venezuela Maritime Boundary Treaty; this treaty came into force on 24 November 1980 after it was ratified by both parties.

The island is the closest Venezuelan territory to the United States, approximately 163 miles (262 km) from the U.S. island of Saint Croix.

=== Agreement with France ===
On June 17, 1980, Venezuela agreed with France that longitude 62°48′52″ W should be the maritime boundary between Aves Island and Guadeloupe and Martinique.

=== 2006 Dominica and Venezuela informal agreement ===
During a visit to Venezuela, Dominica's Prime Minister Roosevelt Skerrit, in June 2006, stated that Aves Island belongs to Venezuela, unofficially ending the territorial claim.

=== Amateur radio "entity" ===
Aves Island is a particularly rare amateur radio "entity", under the ITU prefix YV0. A 2006 expedition by operators to the island required 14 years of planning. Though one member suffered a fatal heart attack, over 42,000 contacts were made during their week-long stay.

== See also ==
- Ankoko Island (another disputed territory involving Venezuela)
- Exclusive economic zone
- Federal Dependencies of Venezuela
- List of marine molluscs of Venezuela
- List of sponges of Venezuela
- List of territorial disputes

== Articles and papers ==
- "Island' talk for Caricom, Venezuela – (July 7, 2006) – Barbados NationNews
- OECS searching for Bird Island solution – (March 16, 2006) – Caribbean Net News
- Shock over Bird Island – (November 10, 2005) – Barbados Advocate News
- Drama over Bird Island – (November 10, 2005) – Barbados Advocate News
- OECS raps Caracas' claim to island – (November 9, 2005) – Barbados NationNews
- Caricom to meet over Aves Island – (October 24, 2005) – Barbados NationNews
- History proves Venezuelan ownership of Isla de Aves
- VicePresident Rangel thinks that the "empire" is behind claim to Aves Island
