= Bolibar, Álava =

Hamlet in Álava, Spain

Bolívar
- Concejo
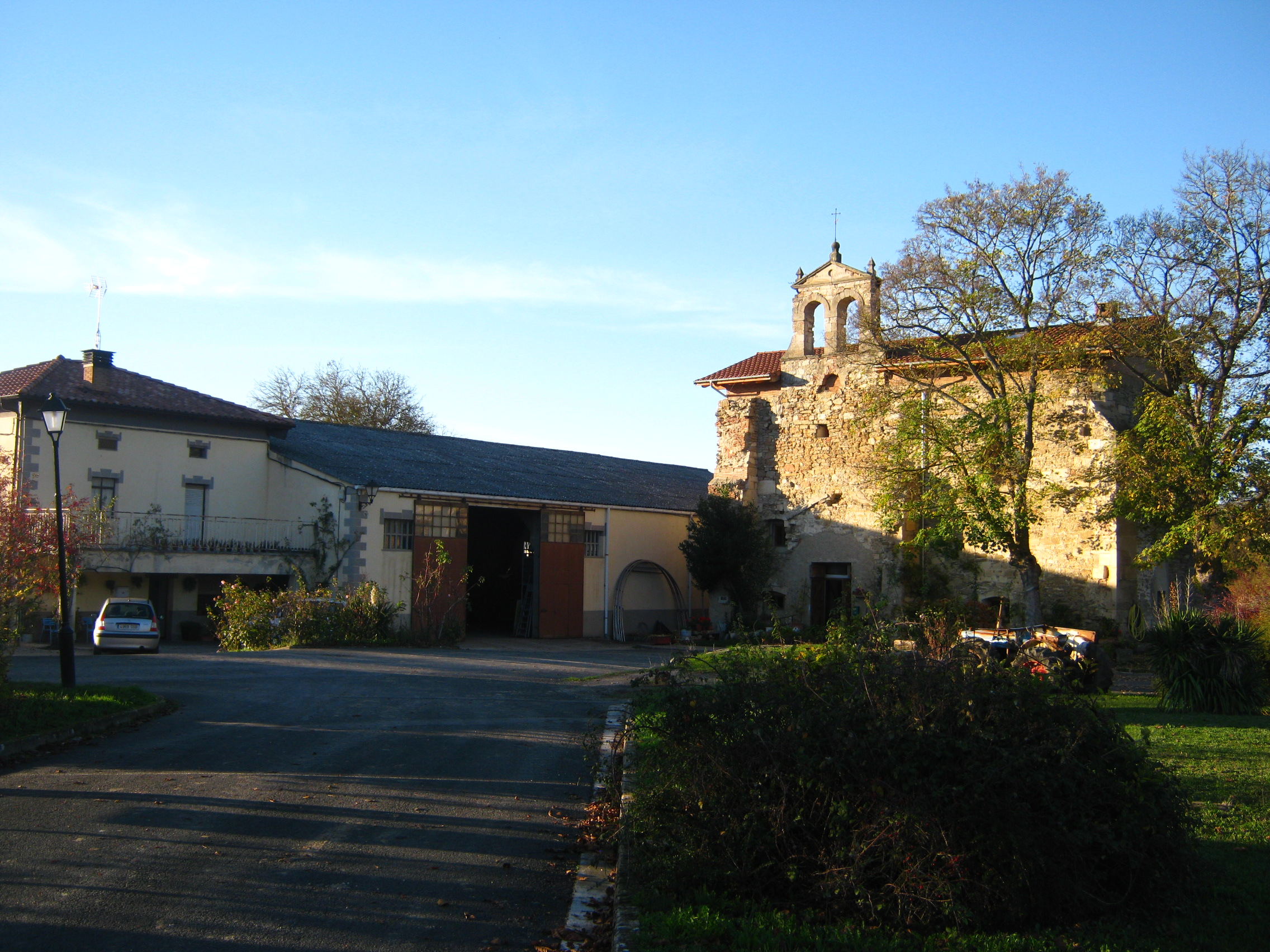
- View of Bolívar

- Coat of arms

- Location within Álava Location within the Basque Country Location within Spain
- Coordinates: 42°48′37″N 2°36′51″W
- Country: Spain
- Autonomous community: Basque Country
- Province: Álava
- Comarca: Vitoria-Gasteiz
- Municipality: Vitoria-Gasteiz

Area
  - Total: 1.65 km^{2} (0.64 sq mi)
- Elevation: 586 m (1,923 ft)

Population (2023)
  - Total: 13
  - Density: 7.9/km^{2} (20/sq mi)
- Postal code: 01194

Bolívar (Basque: Bolibar) is a hamlet and concejo in the municipality of Vitoria-Gasteiz, in Álava province, Basque Country, Spain.
