= Bolívar, Cochabamba =

- Location within Bolivia
- Coordinates: 17°58′S 66°32′W
- Country: Bolivia
- Department: Cochabamba Department
- Province: Bolívar Province
- Municipality: Bolívar Municipality
- Time zone: UTC-4 (BOT)

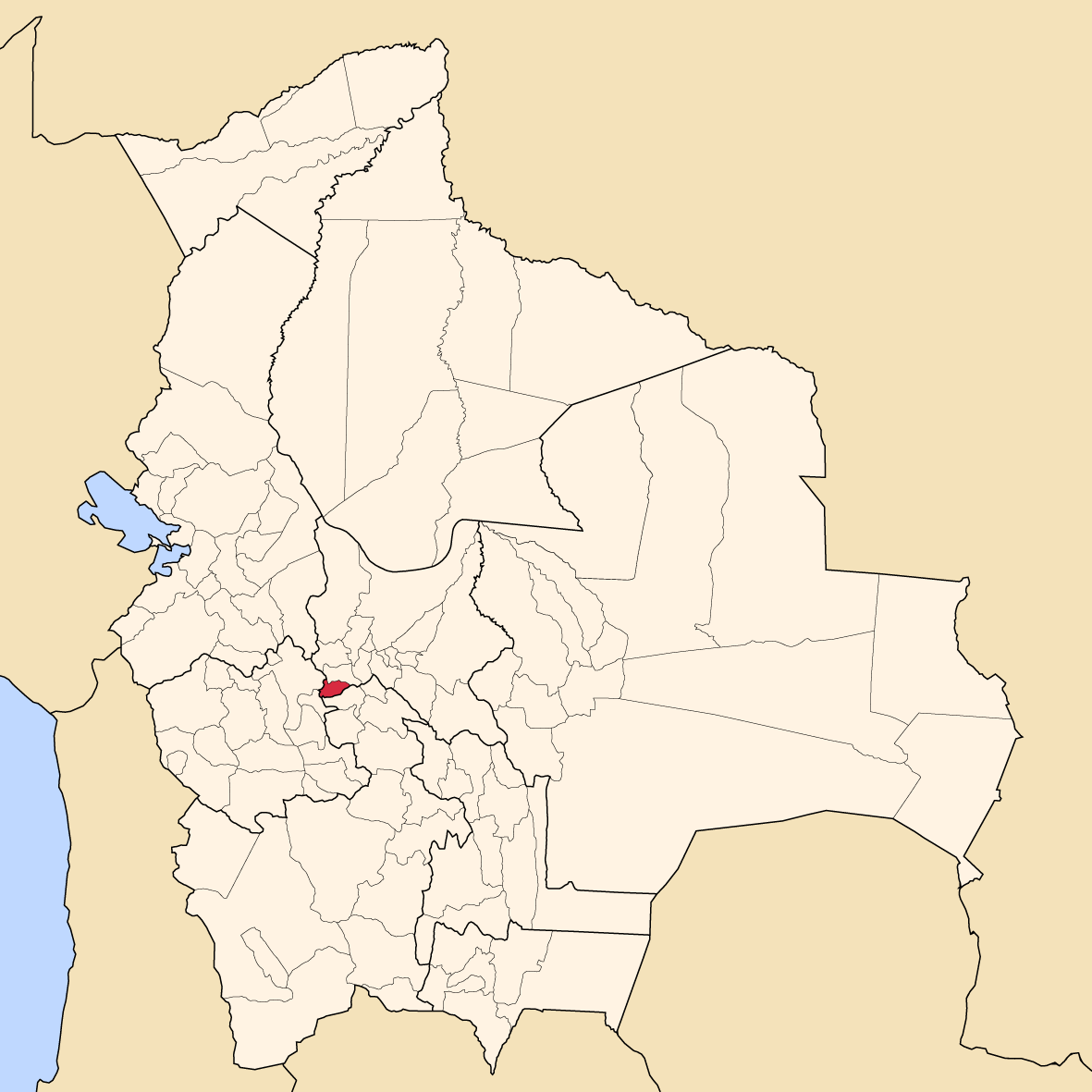
Map of Bolivia showing Simón Bolívar province

Bolívar is a location in the Cochabamba Department, Bolivia. It is the seat of the Bolívar Province.
