= Bolívar Municipality, Táchira =

Bolívar Municipality Municipio Bolívar
- Municipality
- Flag Coat of arms

- Location in Táchira

- Location in Venezuela
- Coordinates: 7°46′26″N 72°25′29″W
- Country: Venezuela
- State: Táchira
- Municipal seat: San Antonio del Táchira

Government
  - Mayor: Sandra Sánchez Prada (PSUV)

Area
  - Total: 178.8 km^{2} (69.0 sq mi)

Population (2011 -> 2019 projection)
  - Total: 62,923 -> 66,081
  - Density: 351.9/km^{2} (911.5/sq mi)
- Time zone: UTC−4 (VET)
- Area code(s): 0276
- Website: Official website

Bolívar Municipality is one of the 29 municipalities that makes up the western Venezuelan state of Táchira and, according to a 2019 population projection by the Venezuelan Statistics National Institute, the municipality has a population of 66,081. The city of San Antonio del Táchira is the municipal seat of the Bolívar Municipality.

== Name ==
The municipality is one of several in Venezuela named "Bolívar Municipality" in honour of Venezuelan independence hero Simón Bolívar.

== Demographics ==
Based on the 2011 Venezuelan census, The population of the Bolívar Municipality was 62,923 people, accounting for 5.25% of the total population of the state of Táchira. The majority (74.7%) of the municipality's population is in the city San Antonio del Táchira, the municipal seat.

By June 2019, official projections from the Venezuelan Statistics National Institute estimated the population of Bolívar as 66,081 people, representing an annual growth rate of 0.61% since 2011 and showing a population density of 323.9 inhabitants/km². However, these projections do not account for the impact of emigration linked to the country's recent economic and political circumstances.

The gender distribution of the population was 49.4% men (30,431) and 50.6% women (31,199). The age distribution showed that the largest segment of the population was aged 15 to 64, comprising 67.9% of the people. Younger people aged 0 to 14 made up 26.3% of the population, while those aged 65 and older accounted for 5.8%. The municipality is mostly urbanized, with 91.3% of inhabitants (56,289) living in urban centers compared to just 8.7% (5,341) in rural areas.

Ethnically, the municipality identified as predominantly White people (49.9%) and Mestizo (42.2%). Minority groups included 1.1% Afro-Venezuelans and 6.8% belonging to other ethnic groups. The literacy rate was 96.5%, with 1,810 inhabitants of Bolívar not able to read or write.

== Government ==
The mayor of the Bolívar Municipality is Sandra Sánchez Prada of the United Socialist Party of Venezuela (PSUV), who was elected in November 2021 and sworn-in the following month as the first female mayor of the municipality. The municipality is divided into five parishes: Bolívar, Angarita, Palotal, Isaías Medina, and Juan Vicente Gómez.
