= Bolivar station (Paris Metro) =

Paris Metro station

Bolivar
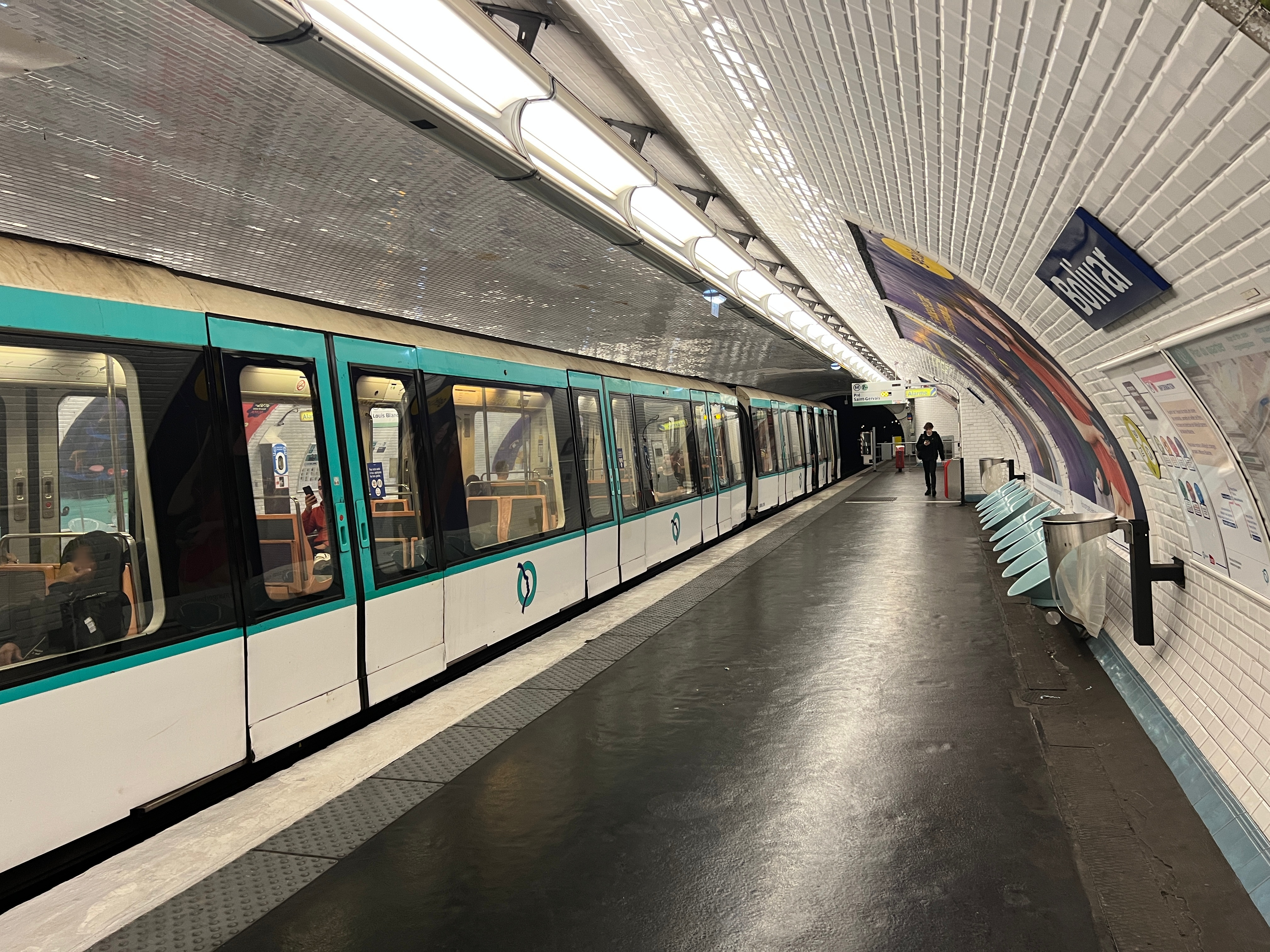
- Station platforms in 2022

General information
- Location: 19th arrondissement of Paris; Île-de-France; France
- Coordinates: 48°52′50″N 2°22′30″E
- System: Paris Metro station
- Owner: RATP
- Operator: RATP
- Line: Paris Metro Paris Metro Line 7bis
- Platforms: 2 side platforms
- Tracks: 2

Other information
- Station code: 22-14
- Fare zone: 1

History
- Opened: 18 July 1911

Passengers
- 278,933 (2020)

Services
Preceding station	Paris Metro	Following station
Jaurès towards Louis Blanc	Line 7bis	Buttes Chaumont towards Pré-Saint-Gervais
Location
- Location within Paris

Bolivar (French pronunciation: [bɔlivaʁ]) is a station on Line 7bis of the Paris Metro in the 19th arrondissement. It is named after the nearby avenue Simon Bolivar, which in turn was named after Simón Bolívar (1783–1830), liberator of several South American countries.

== History ==
The station opened on 18 July 1911, 6 months the opening of a branch of line 7 from Louis Blanc to Pré-Saint-Gervais on 18 January 1911. On 3 December 1967 this branch was separated from line 7, becoming line 7bis.

During the World War I, the station, like other deep metro stations was converted into an air raid shelter. During a violent bomb attack on 11 March 1918, the local population rushed to the shelter in panic and tried to enter it down the stairs of an exit that led to gates that only opened to the outside. The first rows of the crowd were crushed or suffocated by those behind them, and were eventually trampled when the doors finally broke under pressure. 76 people died in this incident. As a result, all gates on the metro are now designed to open inwards as well as outwards.

As part of the Un métro + beau programme by the RATP, the station was renovated and modernised with the corridors being completed on 16 December 2008 and its platforms in 2009.

In 2019, the station was used by 546,780 passengers, making it the 298th busiest of the Metro network out of 302 stations.

In 2020, the station was used by 278,933 passengers amidst the COVID-19 pandemic, making it the 296th busiest of the Metro network out of 305 stations.

== Passenger services ==
=== Access ===
The station has a single entrance at the corner of avenue Secrétan and avenue Simon-Bolivar. Since 1987, it was adorned with a Guimard entrance previously at Barbès–Rochechouart and was listed as a historical monument on 2 December 2016.

=== Station layout ===
G	Street Level
B1	Mezzanine
Line 7bis platforms	Side platform, doors will open on the right
Line 7bis platforms	Inbound	← toward Louis Blanc (Jaurès)
Line 7bis platforms	Outbound	toward Pré-Saint-Gervais (Buttes Chaumont) →
Line 7bis platforms	Side platform, doors will open on the right

=== Platforms ===
Bolivar has a standard configuration with 2 tracks surrounded by 2 side platforms. The platform in the direction of Louis Blanc had a small exhibit that paid homage to the life of Simón Bolívar through an illustrated biography on the walls but was removed during the renovation of the station.

=== Other connections ===
The station is also served by line 26 of the RATP bus network.

== Nearby ==
- Halle Secrétan

== Gallery ==
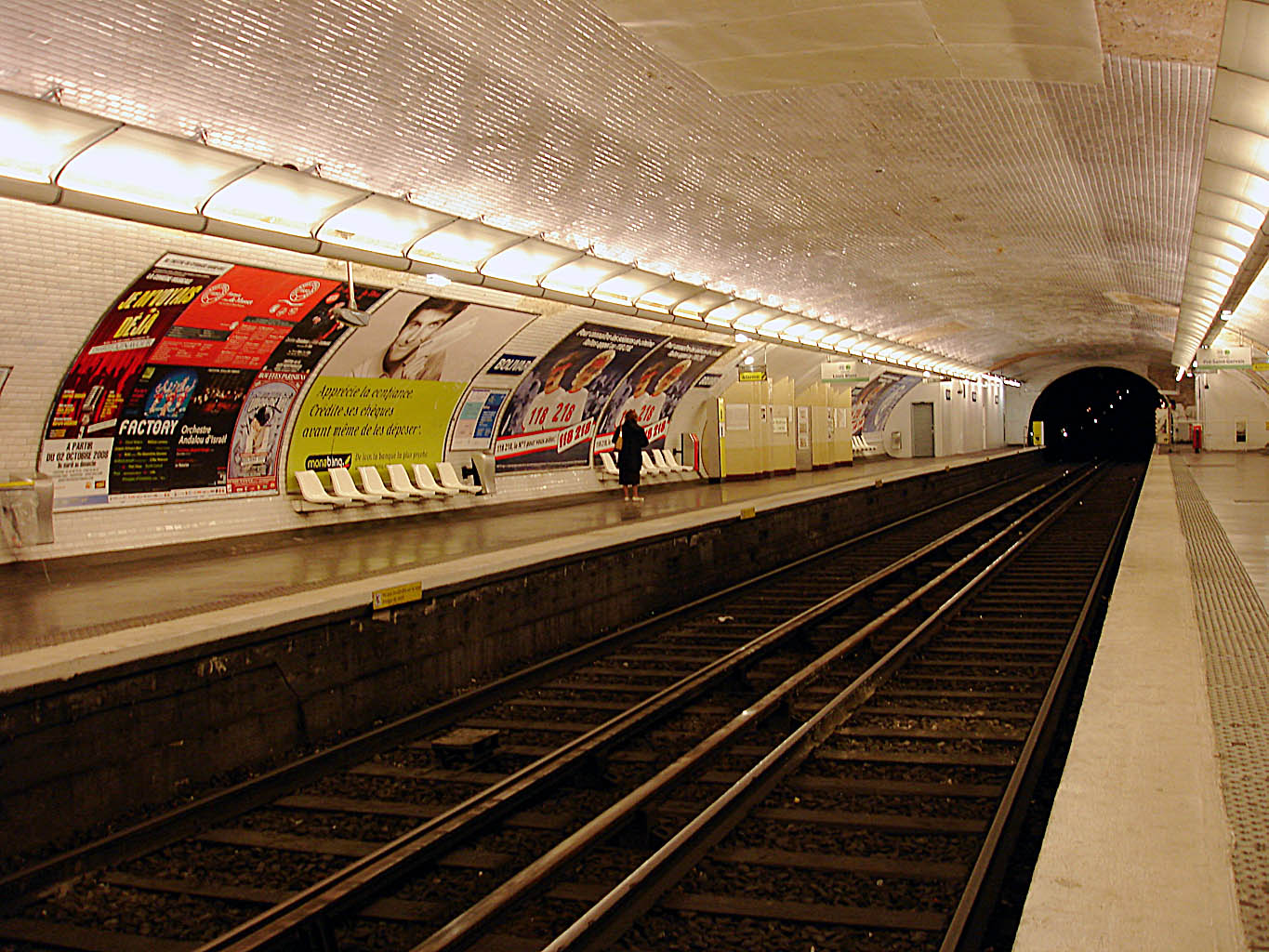
Line 7bis platforms at Bolivar

MF 88 rolling stock on Line 7bis at Bolivar

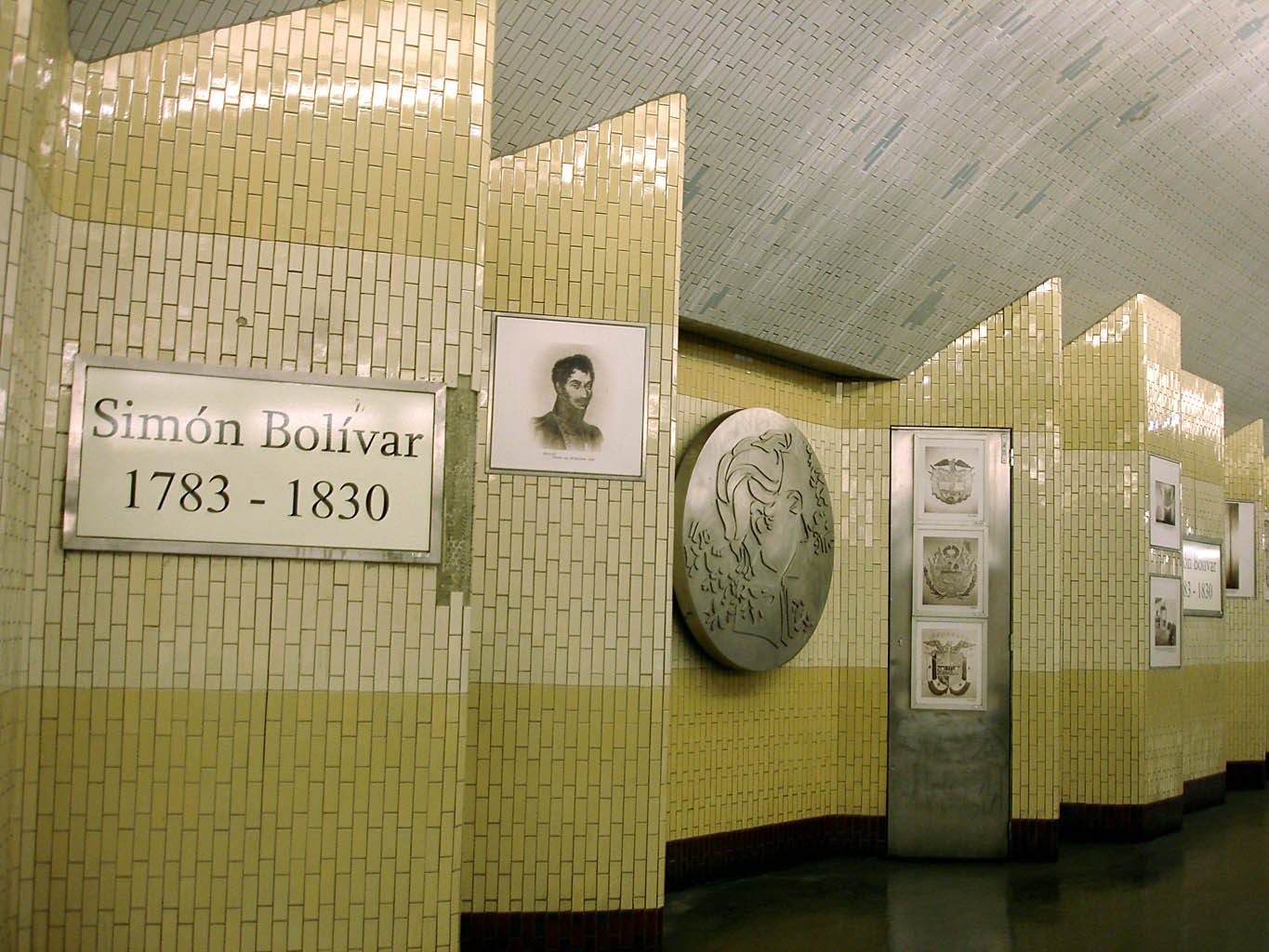
Exhibit on Simón Bolívar (since removed)
