= Bolívar Province, Cochabamba =

Bolívar Province
- Province
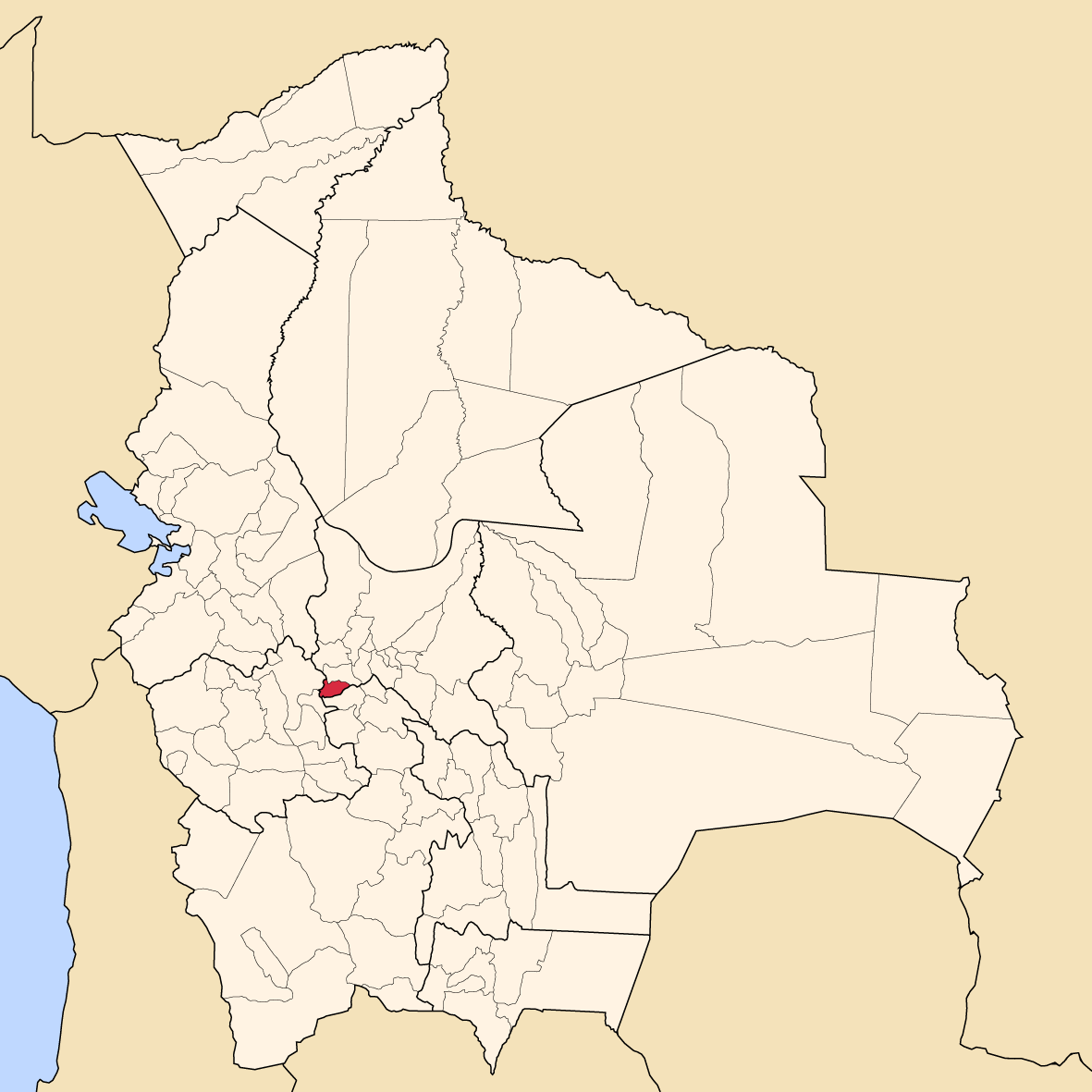
- Location of Bolívar Province within Bolivia

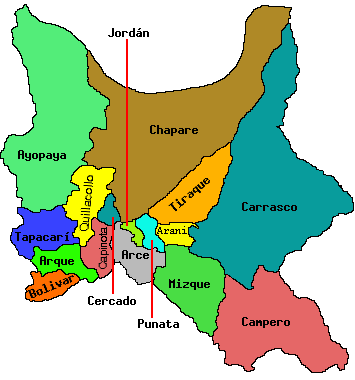
- Coordinates: 18°00′S 66°38′W
- Country: Bolivia
- Department: Cochabamba Department
- Capital: Bolívar

Government
  - Mayor: Aniceto Cuti Felipe (2007)

Area
  - Total: 159 sq mi (413 km^{2})
- Elevation: 13,000 ft (4,000 m)

Population (2024 census)
  - Total: 8,197
  - Density: 51.4/sq mi (19.8/km^{2})
  - Ethnicities: Quechua
- Time zone: UTC-4 (BOT)

Bolívar Province is a province in the Bolivian department of Cochabamba. Its capital is the city of Bolívar, named after Simón Bolívar, a Venezuelan military and political leader.

== Subdivision ==
The province is not further subdivided into municipalities. So Bolívar Municipality and Bolívar Province are identical. The province is divided into nine cantons.

Canton	Inhabitants (2001)	Seat
Bolívar Canton	3,437	Bolívar
Carpani Canton	620	Carpani
Comuna Canton	413	Comuna
Coyuma Canton	541	Coyuma
Challoma Canton	242	Challoma
Jorenko Canton or Villa Verde Canton	665	Jorenko
Vilacaya Canton	632	Vilacaya
Villa Victoria Canton	904	Villa Victoria
Yarbicoya Canton	1,181	Yarbicoya

== The people ==
The people are predominantly indigenous citizens of Quechuan descent.

Ethnic group	Inhabitants (%)
Quechua	91.6
Aymara	4.3
Guaraní, Chiquitos, Moxos	0.1
Not indigenous	4.0
Other indigenous groups	0.0

Ref.: obd.descentralizacion.gov.bo

== Languages ==
The languages spoken in the Bolívar Province are mainly Quechua and Spanish.

Language	Inhabitants
Quechua	7,747
Aymara	484
Guaraní	3
Another native	0
Spanish	3,010
Foreign	6
Only native	4,948
Native and Spanish	2,914
Only Spanish	96

== See also ==
- Machu Tanka Tanka
- Sirk'i
- Wayna Tanka Tanka
