= List of museums in Venezuela =

This is a list of museums in Venezuela.

== Museums ==
Institution	Type of collection	Location	Opened	Picture	Ref.
Aeronautics Museum of Maracay	Historical aviation museum	Maracay	10 December 1963		
Alberto Henríquez Museum of Art	Art museum	Coro	3 August 1997		
Birthplace of Simón Bolívar	Historic house museum	Caracas	5 January 1921		
Bolivarian Museum	Biographical museum	Caracas	1960		
Caracas Museum of Contemporary Art	Art museum	Caracas	30 August 1973		
Children's Museum of Caracas	Children's museum	Caracas	1982		
Jesús Soto Museum of Modern Art	Museum of modern art	Ciudad Bolívar	1973		
Museo de Arte Acarigua-Araure		Acarigua			
Museo de Bellas Artes (Caracas)		Caracas			
National Art Gallery (Caracas)	Art museum	Caracas	May 1976		
National Pantheon of Venezuela		Caracas			
San Carlos de Borromeo Fortress	Living museum	Pampatar	1664 - 1684		
Santa Rosa de la Eminencia castle	War museum	La Asunción	1682		
Palacio Municipal de Caracas		Caracas			
Quinta de Anauco		Caracas			
Venezuelan Baseball Hall of Fame and Museum	Sports museum	Valencia	18 April 2002	(image needed)	
William Phelps Ornithological Collection		Caracas			

== See also ==
- List of libraries in Venezuela
- List of museums by country
