= September 1957 =

Month of 1957

<<	September 1957					>>
Su	Mo	Tu	We	Th	Fr	Sa
1	2	3	4	5	6	7
8	9	10	11	12	13	14
15	16	17	18	19	20	21
22	23	24	25	26	27	28
29	30

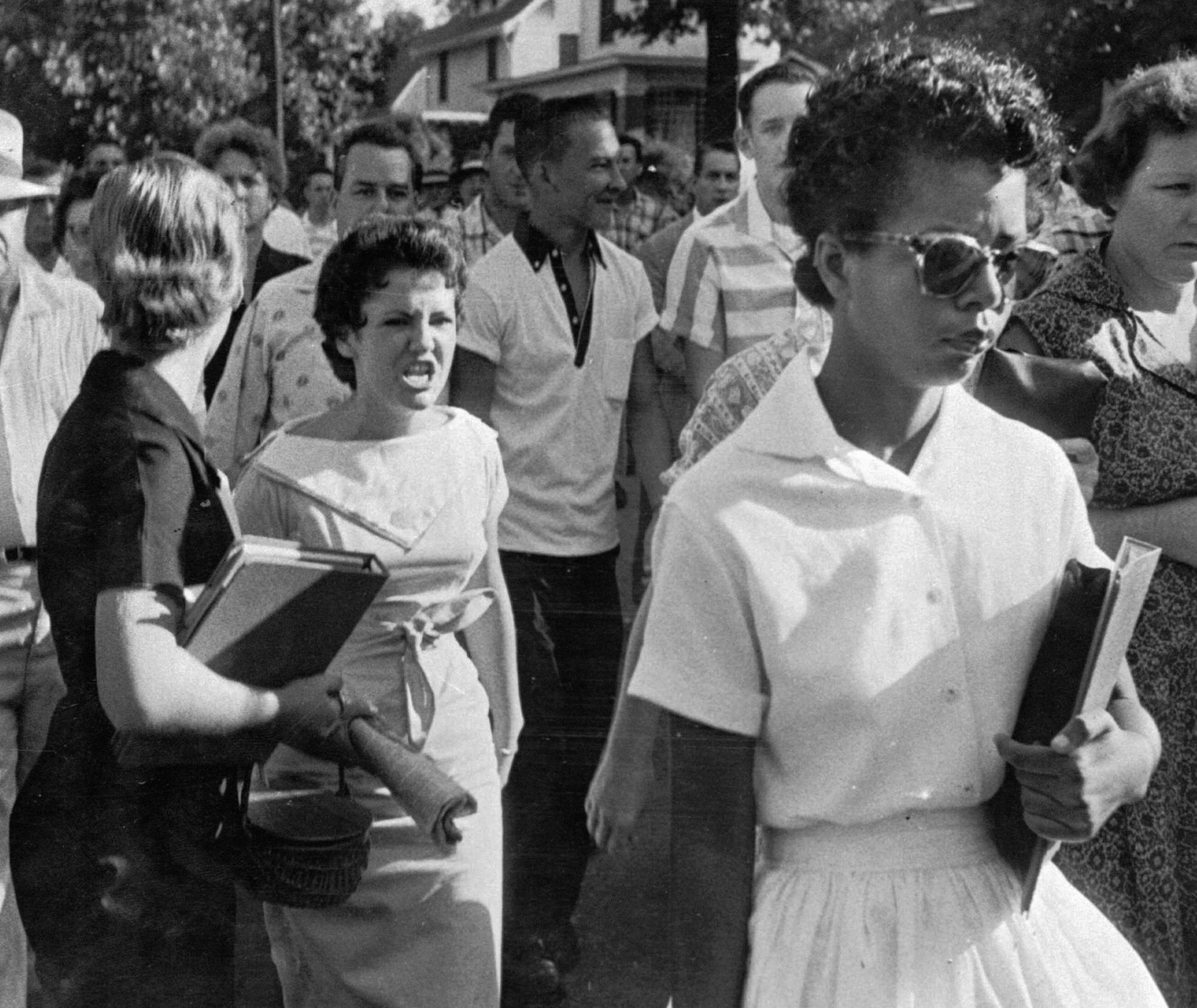
September 4, 1957: Black student Elizabeth Eckford jeered by white student Hazel Bryan while attempting to enter Little Rock Central High School

The following events occurred in September 1957:

== September 1, 1957 (Sunday) ==
- Apparently because a stopcock in the brake line was accidentally bumped by a coupler, the brakes failed on a heavily loaded 12-car church excursion train returning from Montego Bay to Kingston, British Jamaica. The crew failed to detect and act on the problem until the train ran away and derailed on a curve at Kendal. Five cars rolled into a ditch and two became wedged in a narrow cutting; 179 people were killed, and hundreds injured.
- Born: Gloria Estefan (born Gloria María Milagrosa Fajardo García), Cuban-born American singer; in Havana

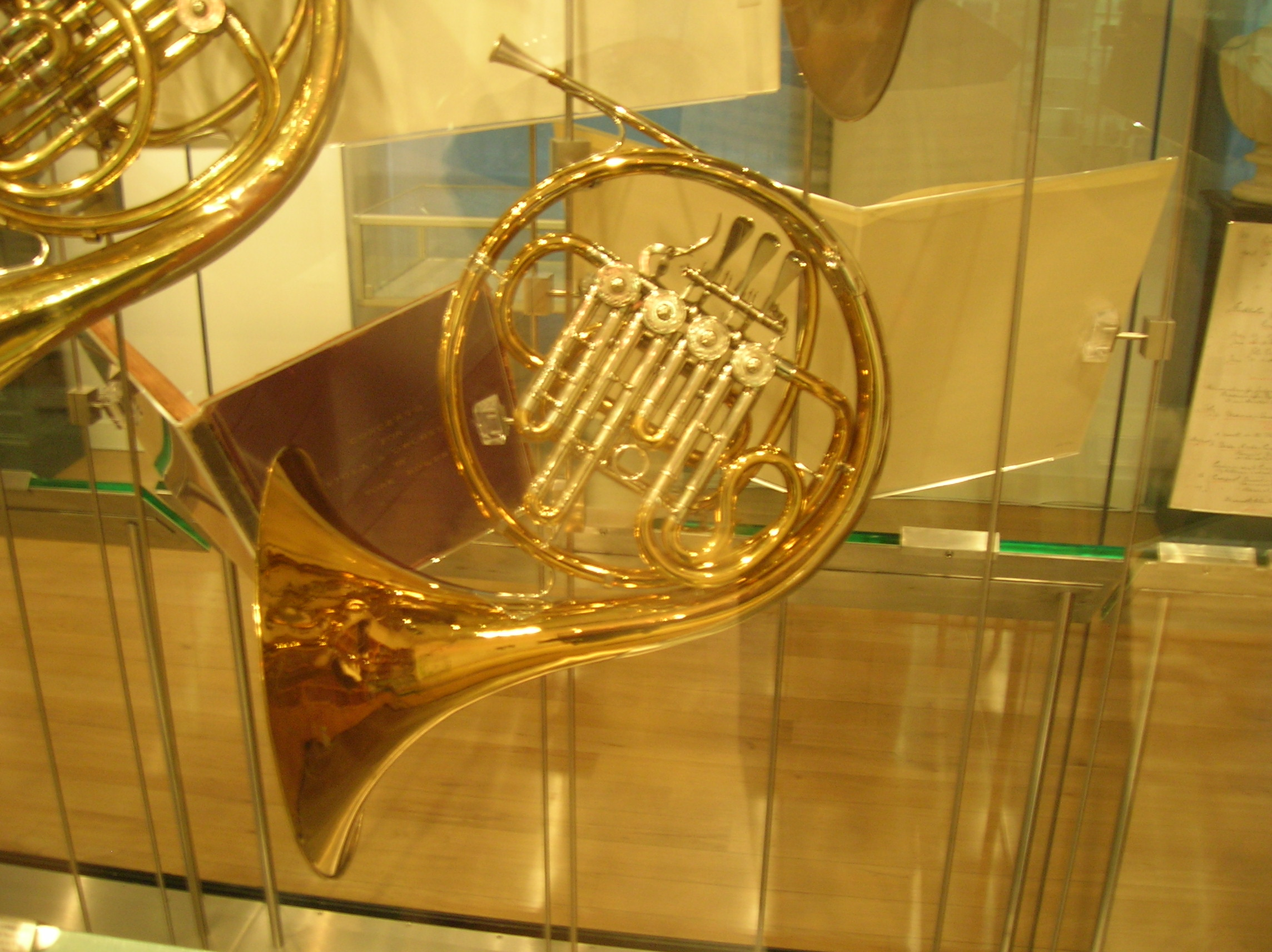
French horn damaged in Dennis Brain's fatal crash, now restored

- Died: Dennis Brain, 36, English French horn player, died in a traffic collision.

== September 2, 1957 (Monday) ==
- Died: Bobby Myers, 30, American NASCAR driver, was killed in a race crash during the Southern 500 in Darlington, South Carolina.

== September 4, 1957 (Wednesday) ==
- Died: Hermann Kastner, 70, East German politician and defector, died of a heart attack aboard a train in Munich, West Germany.

== September 5, 1957 (Thursday) ==
- During the Cuban Revolution, Fulgencio Batista’s forces bombed anti-government riots in Cienfuegos.
- The United Nations Security Council unanimously passed Security Council Resolution 125, recommending to the General Assembly that the Federation of Malaya be admitted to the United Nations.

== September 6, 1957 (Friday) ==
- Born: José Sócrates, 117th Prime Minister of Portugal; in Vilar de Maçada, Alijó

== September 7, 1957 (Saturday) ==
- Approaching a section where one track was closed for construction, a train from Paris to Nîmes failed to slow for the crossover at Nozières-Brignon station, and reached it at 92 km/h (57 mph) instead of 30 km/h (19 mph). The locomotive derailed and breached a culvert under the track, which stopped it suddenly, worsening the pileup of cars. 27 people were killed and 134 injured, 30 seriously.
- In New Orleans, Louisiana, television station WWL-TV went on the air for the first time.

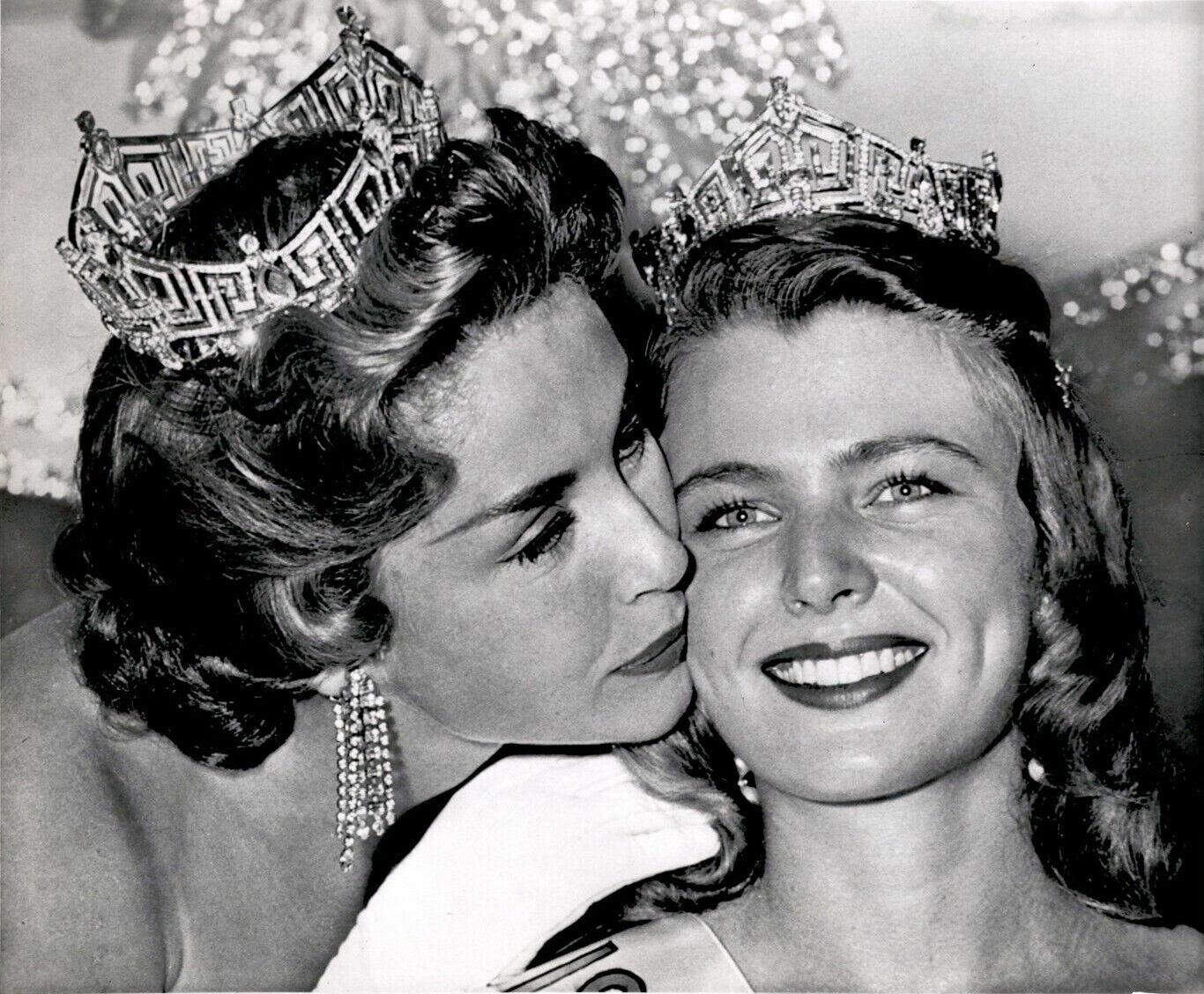
Outgoing Miss America Marian McKnight kisses Marilyn Van Derbur

- Marilyn Van Derbur won the Miss America 1958 pageant in Atlantic City, New Jersey.
- Born:
  - Stewart Finlay-McLennan, Australian actor; in Broken Hill, New South Wales
  - José Luis Gaitán, Argentine footballer; in Rosario
  - Lynbert Johnson, American professional basketball player; in New York City
  - Anders Jormin, Swedish bassist and composer; in Stockholm
  - Ewa Kasprzyk, Polish athlete; in Poznań
  - Corporal Kirchner (ring name of Michael James Penzel), United States Army paratrooper and professional wrestler; in Chicago (d. 2021, heart attack)
  - John McInerney, British-German singer-songwriter (Bad Boys Blue); in Liverpool
  - Iskra Mihaylova, Bulgarian politician and Member of the European Parliament; in Sofia
  - Nasser Mohammadkhani, Iranian footballer; in Tehran
  - J. Smith-Cameron (born Jean Isabel Smith), American actress; in Louisville, Kentucky
  - Jermaine Stewart (born William Jermaine Stewart), American R&B singer; in Columbus, Ohio (d. 1997, AIDS-related hepatocellular carcinoma)
- Died: Manlio Rho, 56, Italian painter

== September 8, 1957 (Sunday) ==
- Born:
  - Joe Bocan (born Johanne Beauchamp), Canadian pop singer and actress; in Montreal
  - Walt Easley, professional American football fullback; in Charleston, West Virginia (d. 2013)
  - Ricardo Montaner (born Héctor Eduardo Reglero Montaner), Argentine-born Venezuelan singer; in Valentín Alsina, Buenos Aires
  - Heather Thomas, American actress (The Fall Guy); in Greenwich, Connecticut

== September 9, 1957 (Monday) ==
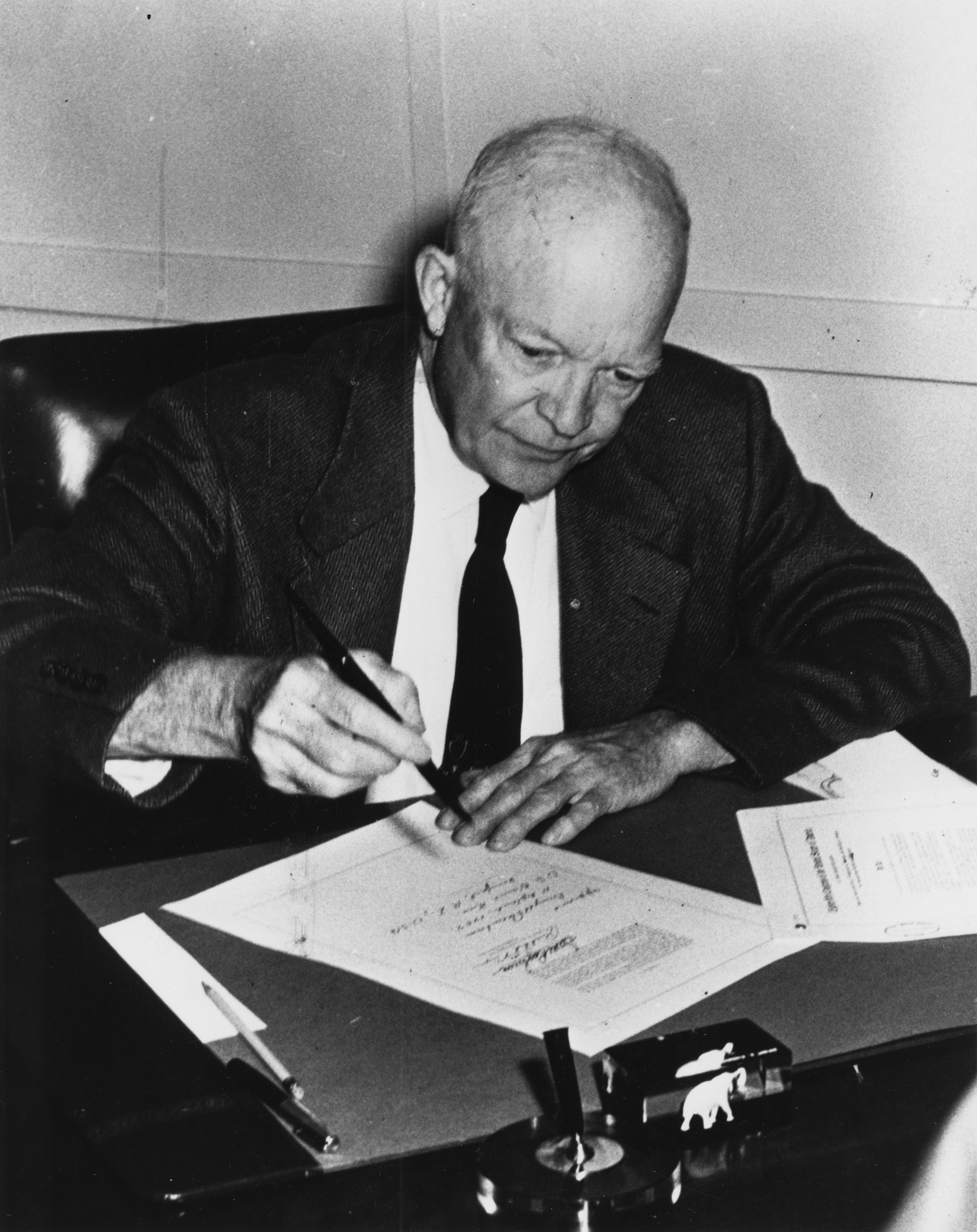
President Eisenhower signs the Civil Rights Act of 1957

- U.S. President Dwight D. Eisenhower signed the Civil Rights Act of 1957 into law, establishing the United States Commission on Civil Rights.
- Died: Muhammad al-Muqri, 103, former Grand Vizier of French Morocco

== September 10, 1957 (Tuesday) ==
- Shortly after midnight, a bomb exploded at Hattie Cotton Elementary School in Nashville, Tennessee, which had admitted its first African-American student the previous day, severely damaging one wing of the building.
- William C. Beall, chief photographer for The Washington Daily News, took the Pulitzer Prize-winning photograph Faith and Confidence at a parade in Chinatown, Washington, D.C.
- Born: Murat Zyazikov, Russian politician, President of Ingushetia (2002-2008), Ambassador of Russia to Cyprus, in Osh, Kyrgyz SSR, Soviet Union
- Died: Walter A. Lynch, 63, American lawyer and politician, former member of the United States House of Representatives from New York

== September 11, 1957 (Wednesday) ==
- Born: Preben Elkjær, Danish footballer; in Copenhagen

== September 12, 1957 (Thursday) ==
- Born:
  - Jan Egeland, Norwegian politician, diplomat and humanitarian; in Stavanger, Rogaland
  - Kadim Al Sahir, Iraqi singer; in Mosul
  - Rachel Ward, English-Australian actress; in Cornwell, Oxfordshire
  - Hans Zimmer, German film score composer; in Frankfurt, West Germany
- Died: Clendenin J. Ryan, 52, American businessman and magazine publisher, shot himself to death.

== September 13, 1957 (Friday) ==
- Born:
  - Cesare Bocci, Italian actor; in Camerino
  - Mal Donaghy, Northern Irish footballer; in Belfast
  - Bongbong Marcos (born Ferdinand Romualdez Marcos Jr.), 17th President of the Philippines; in Santa Mesa, Manila

== September 16, 1957 (Monday) ==
- Born: David McCreery, Irish footballer; in Belfast
- Died: Qi Baishi, 93, Chinese painter

== September 17, 1957 (Tuesday) ==
- Born: Wayne White, American painter and puppeteer

== September 18, 1957 (Wednesday) ==
- Born: Mark Wells, American professional and Olympic champion ice hockey player; in St. Clair Shores, Michigan (d. 2024)
- Died: Sir Galba (born George Brindsley McSween), 38, Grenada-born calypsonian, died by suicide after stabbing his girlfriend.

== September 19, 1957 (Thursday) ==
- Born:
  - Mark Acheson, Canadian film, television and voice actor; in Edmonton, Alberta
  - Chris Roupas, Greek-American basketball player; in York, Pennsylvania

== September 20, 1957 (Friday) ==
- American boxer Archie Moore retained the world light-heavyweight title with a seventh-round knockout of Tony Anthony in Los Angeles.
- Born: Sabine Christiansen, German journalist and television presenter; in Preetz, Schleswig-Holstein, West Germany
- Died:
  - Jean Sibelius, 91, Finnish composer, died of a cerebral hemorrhage.
  - Merrill Moore, 54, American poet and psychiatrist, died of cancer.

== September 21, 1957 (Saturday) ==
- King Haakon VII of Norway died of a respiratory ailment at the age of 85. His 54-year-old son, Olav V, succeeded him as King.

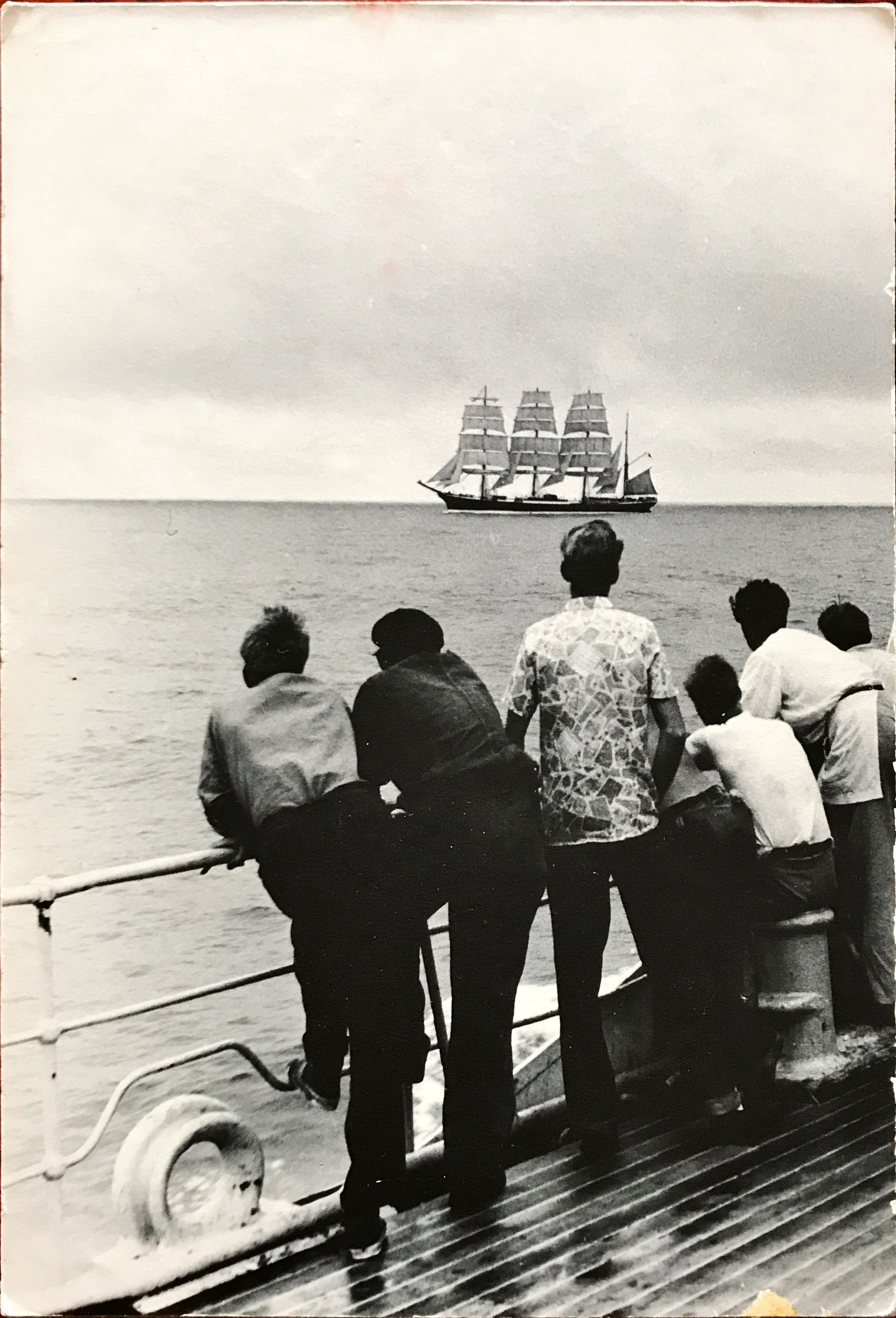
Pamir on final voyage

- The German sailing ship Pamir sank off the Azores in a hurricane. Of the 86 men aboard, 80 died either in the sinking or over the next three days before the survivors were rescued.
- Born:
  - Ethan Coen, American film director, producer, screenwriter and editor, brother of Joel Coen; in St. Louis Park, Minnesota
  - Kevin Rudd, 26th Prime Minister of Australia; in Nambour, Queensland
- Died: Norma Giménez, 27, Argentine stage and film actress, committed suicide by throwing herself under a train.

== September 22, 1957 (Sunday) ==
- Born:
  - Nick Cave, Australian musician, songwriter, author, screenwriter and actor; in Warracknabeal, Victoria
  - Mark Johnson, American college and Olympic ice hockey coach and college, professional and Olympic champion ice hockey player; in Minneapolis
  - Dalia Reyes Barrios, Venezuelan art collector; in Maracaibo
- Died: Toyoda Soemu, 72, Japanese admiral

== September 23, 1957 (Monday) ==
- Born: Rosalind Chao, American actress known for M*A*S*H, Star Trek: The Next Generation and Star Trek: Deep Space Nine; in Los Angeles

== September 24, 1957 (Tuesday) ==
- Camp Nou, home stadium of FC Barcelona, officially opened in Barcelona, Spain.
- Brooklyn Dodgers defeated the Pittsburgh Pirates 2-0, at their final game in front of 6,702 fans before relocating to Los Angeles.

== September 25, 1957 (Wednesday) ==
- The second Atlas launch vehicle was destroyed in a launching attempt at Cape Canaveral, Florida.

== September 26, 1957 (Thursday) ==
- West Side Story, a new musical by Leonard Bernstein with lyrics by Stephen Sondheim, opened at the Winter Garden Theatre on Broadway in New York City.
- Born: Luigi De Canio, Italian footballer and football manager; in Matera

== September 27, 1957 (Friday) ==
- Born: Peter Sellars, American theatre director; in Pittsburgh

== September 29, 1957 (Sunday) ==
- The Kyshtym disaster occurred at the Mayak nuclear reprocessing plant in Russia.
- In British Nigeria, a 16-car train from Lagos to Kano was being driven carefully because of possible track damage from heavy rain, but when a culvert became blocked, the water rose rapidly and the driver was caught unaware by the resulting washout, about 20 miles (30 km) south of Ibadan. Seven cars derailed; early reports indicated 300 people missing, but it turned out that many of them walked away. However, 66 were killed and 122 injured.
- At Montgomery, Pakistan, a Karachi-bound express passenger train collided at full speed with a stationary oil-tanker train before midnight. 300 people were killed and 150 injured by the accident.
- Born: Andrew Dice Clay, American comedian; in Brooklyn, New York City
- Died: Manuel Briones, 64, Filipino lawyer, judge and politician

== September 30, 1957 (Monday) ==
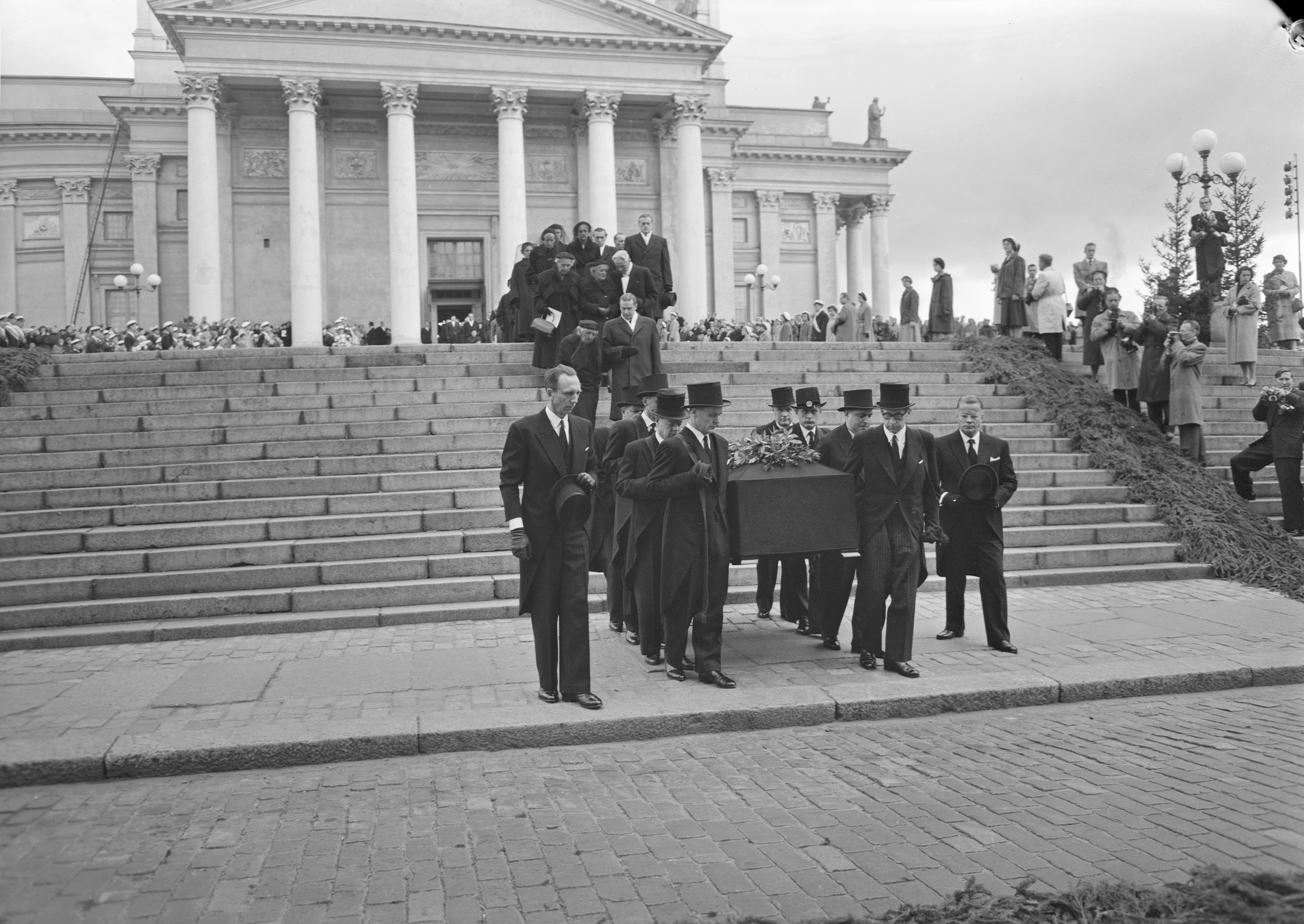
Funeral of Jean Sibelius

- The funeral of composer Jean Sibelius was held in Helsinki.
- Born: Fran Drescher, American actress; in Flushing, Queens, New York City
- Died: David Frederick Wallace, 57, American architect, brother of former First Lady of the United States Bess Truman, died of kidney disease.
