= Dalia Reyes Barrios =

Venezuelan art collector

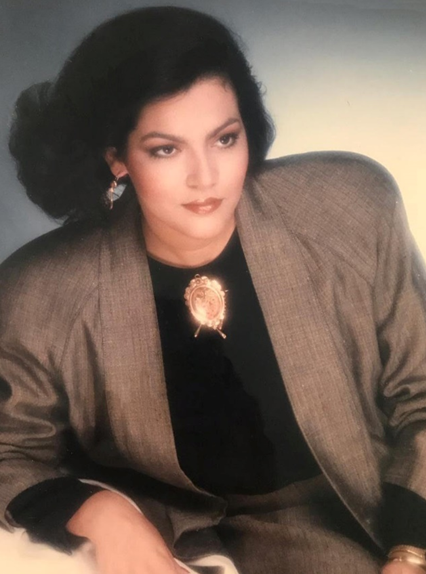
- Born: September 22, 1957 (age 68); Maracaibo, Venezuela
- Other name: Dalia Cordero Casal
- Known for: architecture, socialite

Dalia Reyes Barrios (born 22 September 1957), also known as Dalia Cordero Casal, is a Venezuelan architect, art collector, philanthropist and socialite.

== Career ==
Dalia is co-founder of two art institutions: the Acarigua Araure Art Museum (1987) and the Venezuelan American Endowment for the Arts (VAEA) in New York (1990). Between 1980 and 1994, she was also president of Fundación Juvenil Venezolana. Dalia has been photographed by Edward Mapplehtorpe, Andy Warhol, Arnold Newman, Margarita Scannone and Memo Vogeler, among others.

== Personal life ==
She was married to businessman Ali Cordero Casal; the couple had three daughters during their marriage. She and her ex-husband, Cordero Casal, have been included in Art & Auction magazine's most important art collectors.
