= October 1957 =

Month of 1957

<<	October 1957					>>
Su	Mo	Tu	We	Th	Fr	Sa
		1	2	3	4	5
6	7	8	9	10	11	12
13	14	15	16	17	18	19
20	21	22	23	24	25	26
27	28	29	30	31

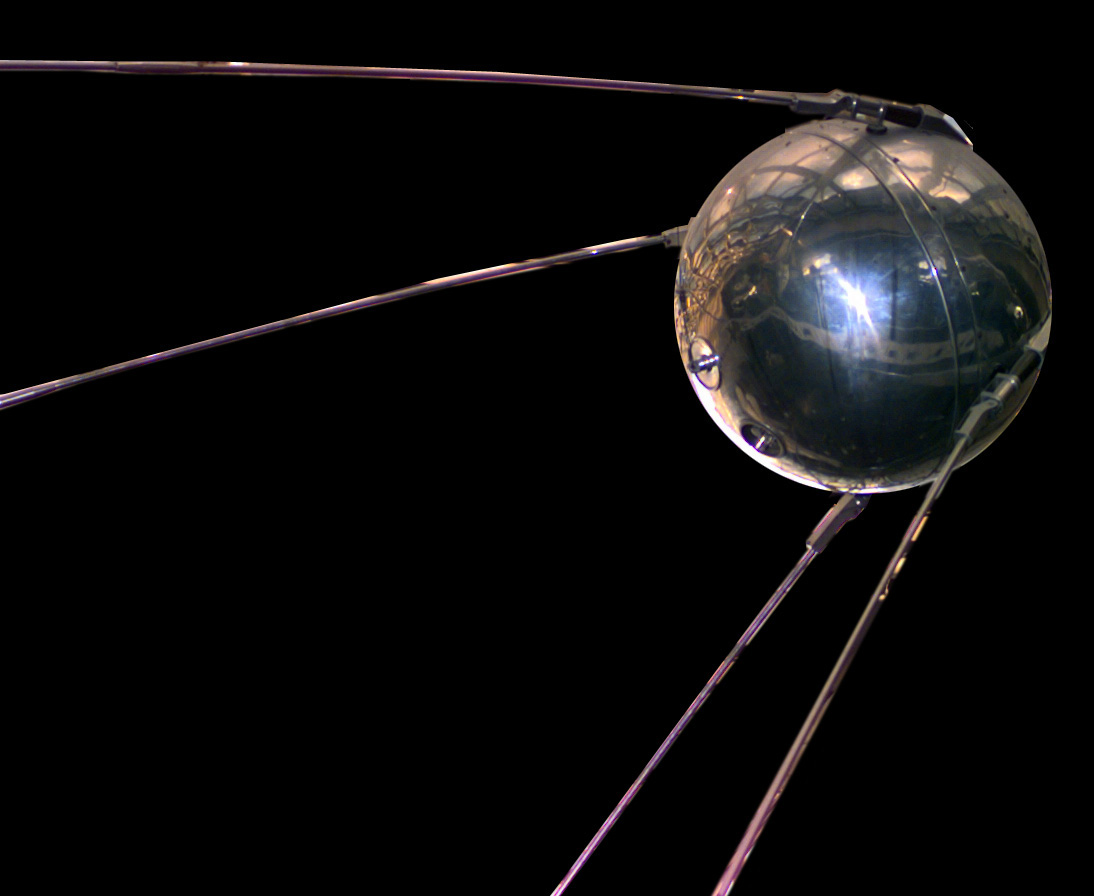
October 4, 1957: Sputnik, the first-ever artificial satellite, launched into space

The following events occurred in October 1957:

== October 1, 1957 (Tuesday) ==
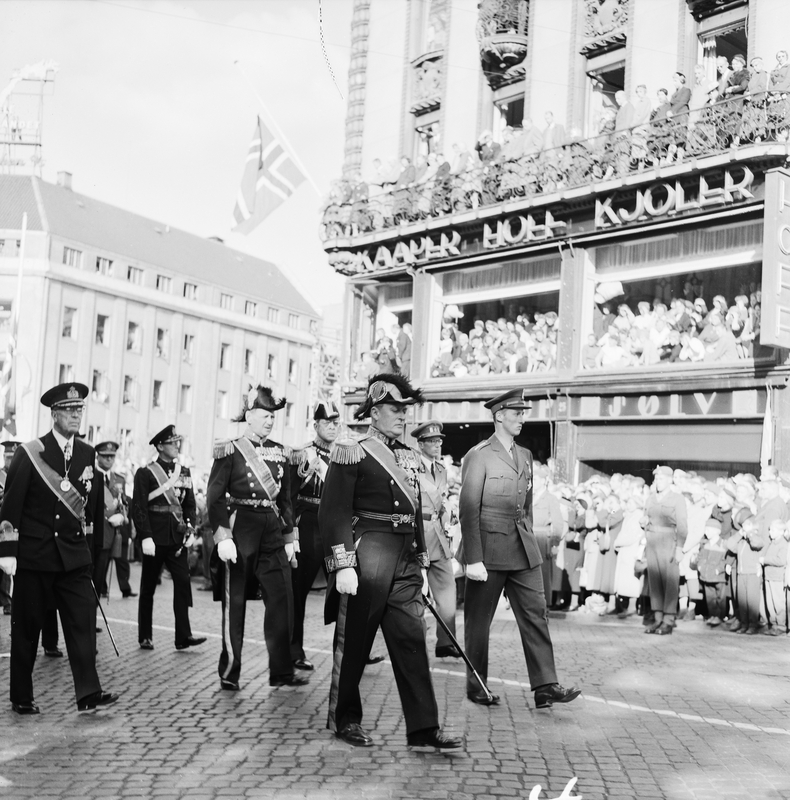
Funeral procession of King Haakon VII of Norway

- King Haakon VII of Norway was buried in the Royal Mausoleum at Akershus Fortress.
- Died: Charles Howard Candler Sr., 78, American businessman (Coca-Cola Company) and author, died of a heart attack.

== October 2, 1957 (Wednesday) ==
- In Tel Aviv, Israel, the Fredric R. Mann Auditorium, the concert hall of the Israel Philharmonic Orchestra, opened with a performance led by American conductor Leonard Bernstein. David Ben-Gurion, the Prime Minister of Israel, spoke at the event.
- The 1957 World Series began between the New York Yankees and the Milwaukee Braves. The following day, Jack Gould of The New York Times would criticize NBC for attempting to televise the World Series in color.
- The American film Raintree County, directed by Edward Dmytryk, received its world premiere at the Brown Theatre in Louisville, Kentucky.
- Died: Victor Sévère, 89, French politician from Martinique

== October 3, 1957 (Thursday) ==
- Willy Brandt was elected as Governing Mayor of West Berlin.
- Born: Diane Finley, Canadian politician; in Hamilton, Ontario
- Died:
  - Artie Auerbach, 54, American comic actor and photographer, died of a heart attack.
  - William Marshall Bullitt, 84, American lawyer and author, former Solicitor General of the United States, died of a heart attack.
  - Walter Duranty, 73, Anglo-American journalist
  - Bernard Maybeck, 95, American Arts and Crafts architect
  - Andre Morize, 74, professor of French literature at Harvard University
  - Lőrinc Szabó, 57, Hungarian poet, died of a heart attack.

== October 4, 1957 (Friday) ==
- Sputnik program: The Union of Soviet Socialist Republics launched Sputnik 1, the first artificial Earth satellite, beginning the Sputnik crisis and the Space Age. This event galvanized interest and action on the part of the American public to support an active role in space research, technology, and exploration.

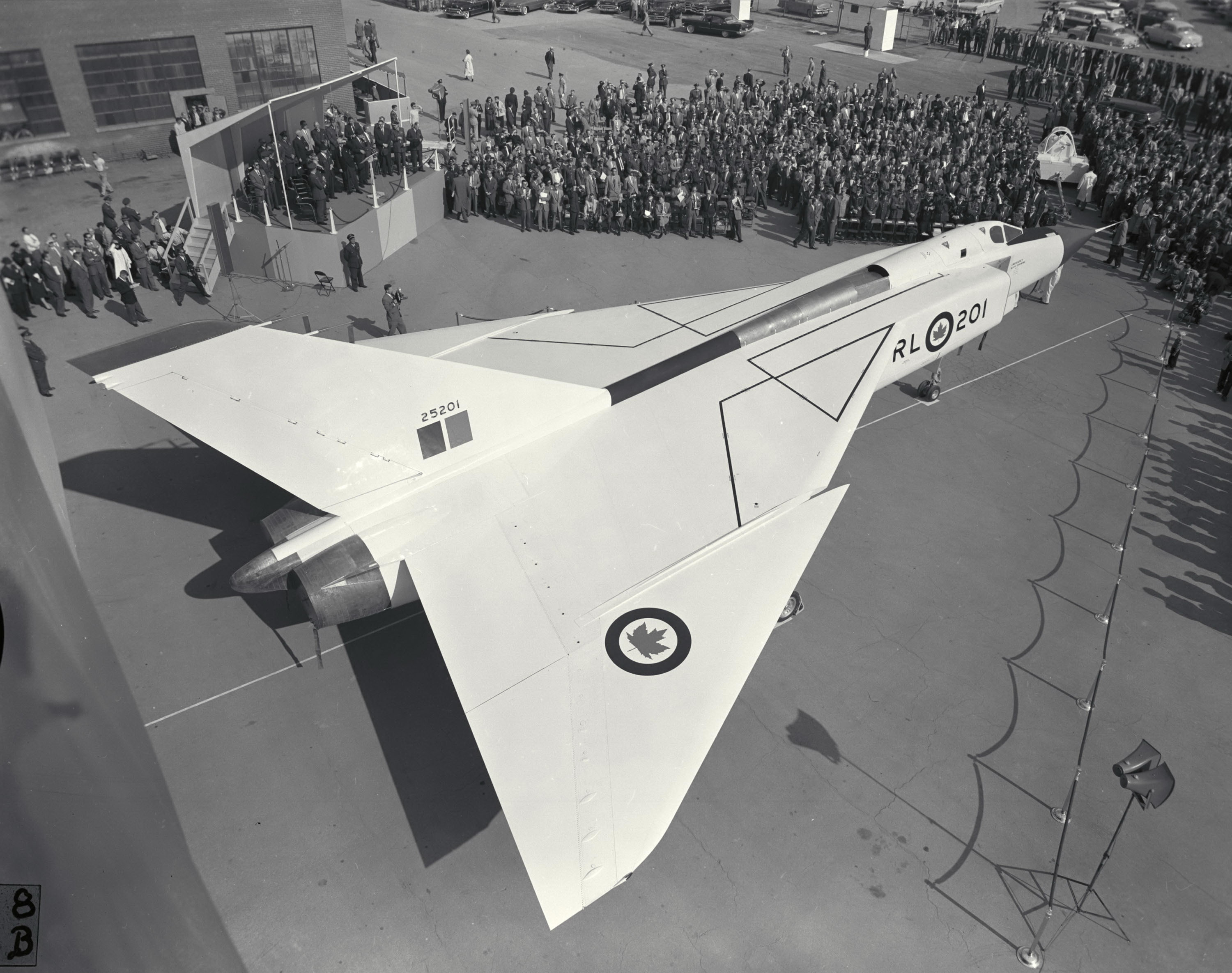
Rollout of the first Avro Canada CF-105 Arrow

- The Avro Canada CF-105 Arrow delta wing interceptor aircraft was unveiled in Malton, Mississauga, Ontario.
- Santa Mercedes, a Grace Line freighter, became the 200,000th vessel locked through the Panama Canal.
- Born:
  - Bill Fagerbakke, American actor; in Fontana, California
  - Gregory T. Linteris, American scientist and Space Shuttle payload specialist; in Demarest, New Jersey
- Died:
  - Sir Geoffrey Arbuthnot, KCB, DSO, 72, Royal Navy vice admiral
  - Clarence C. Caldwell, 80, American attorney, 9th Attorney General of South Dakota
  - Pierneef (born Jacobus Hendrik Pierneef), 71, South African artist
  - Josephine Pinckney, 62, American novelist and poet, died of complications from a respiratory infection.

== October 5, 1957 (Saturday) ==
- In the 11th National Hockey League All-Star Game, held at the Montreal Forum, the NHL All-Star team defeated the Stanley Cup champion Montreal Canadiens by a score of 5–3.
- Born: Bernie Mac (born Bernard Jeffrey McCullough), American stand-up comedian and actor; in Chicago, Illinois (d. 2008, complications from pneumonia)

== October 6, 1957 (Sunday) ==
- Died: Robert Renison, 82, Irish-born Anglican Metropolitan of Ontario

== October 7, 1957 (Monday) ==
- Born: Jayne Torvill, British Olympic champion ice dancer; in Nottingham, England
- Died:
  - Michael N. Delagi, 78, American lawyer, politician and judge
  - Jekuthiel Ginsburg, 68, Ukrainian-born American professor of mathematics at Yeshiva University, died of a heart attack.
  - Yang Gang, 51–52, Chinese journalist, novelist and translator, committed suicide by drug overdose.

== October 8, 1957 (Tuesday) ==
- Born: Magdalena Cajías, Bolivian academic, historian, and politician; in La Paz, Bolivia
- Died:
  - Hassiba Ben Bouali, 19, Algerian militant, was killed in action.
  - Ali La Pointe (born Ali Ammar), 27, Algerian militant, was killed in action.
  - Little Omar (born Yacef Omar), 13, Algerian militant, was killed in action.

== October 9, 1957 (Wednesday) ==
- A radio telescope at Jodrell Bank Observatory in Cheshire, England, which would later be named the Lovell Telescope, was controlled from its control room for the first time.
- A Boeing B-47 Stratojet bomber crashed and exploded in Orlando, Florida, killing the four military officers aboard, including Col. Michael McCoy, the wing commander at Pinecastle Air Force Base, who was piloting the aircraft, and RAF Group Captain John Woodroffe. Pinecastle AFB would later be renamed McCoy Air Force Base in honor of Col. McCoy.
- Born:
  - Herman Brusselmans, Belgian novelist, poet, playwright and columnist; in Hamme, East Flanders, Belgium
  - Yuri Usachov, Russian cosmonaut; in Donetsk, Rostov Oblast, Russian Soviet Federative Socialist Republic
- Died:
  - Arthur Cranfield, 65, British newspaper editor
  - George M. Stratton, 92, American psychologist

== October 10, 1957 (Thursday) ==
- A fire at the Windscale nuclear reactor on the north-west coast of England released radioactive material into the surrounding environment, including iodine-131.
- Komla Agbeli Gbedemah, the Minister for Finance of Ghana, ate breakfast at the White House with U.S. President Dwight D. Eisenhower after having been refused seating at a Howard Johnson's restaurant in Dover, Delaware, because of his race.
- The Milwaukee Braves won the 1957 World Series, defeating the New York Yankees 4 games to 3. President Eisenhower praised the 1957 Series as one of the finest in recent history.

- The Walt Disney Productions television series Zorro debuted on the ABC television network.
- Born: Rumiko Takahashi, Japanese manga artist; in Niigata, Japan
- Died:
  - Choe Nam-seon, 67, Korean author, publisher and political activist
  - William Clark, 66, United States federal judge, died of a heart attack.

== October 11, 1957 (Friday) ==
- The orbit of the last stage of the R-7 Semyorka rocket (carrying Sputnik 1) was first successfully calculated on an IBM 704 computer at the MIT Computation Center, Cambridge, Massachusetts, as part of Operation Moonwatch.
- American actor Marlon Brando married Indian-born British actress Anna Kashfi. The couple would divorce in 1959.
- In Milwaukee, Wisconsin, 17-year-old high school football player John Barczak was injured during a scrimmage. He would die of a ruptured kidney on October 28.
- Born:
  - Dawn French, British comedian; in Holyhead, Anglesey, Wales
  - Eric Keenleyside, Canadian actor; in St. Stephen, New Brunswick
- Died:
  - Paul Gunn, 57, United States World War II aviator, died in a plane crash.
  - Donald E. Montgomery, 60, American economist, committed suicide by firearm.
  - Francis R. Stoddard Jr., 80, American lawyer and politician

== October 12, 1957 (Saturday) ==
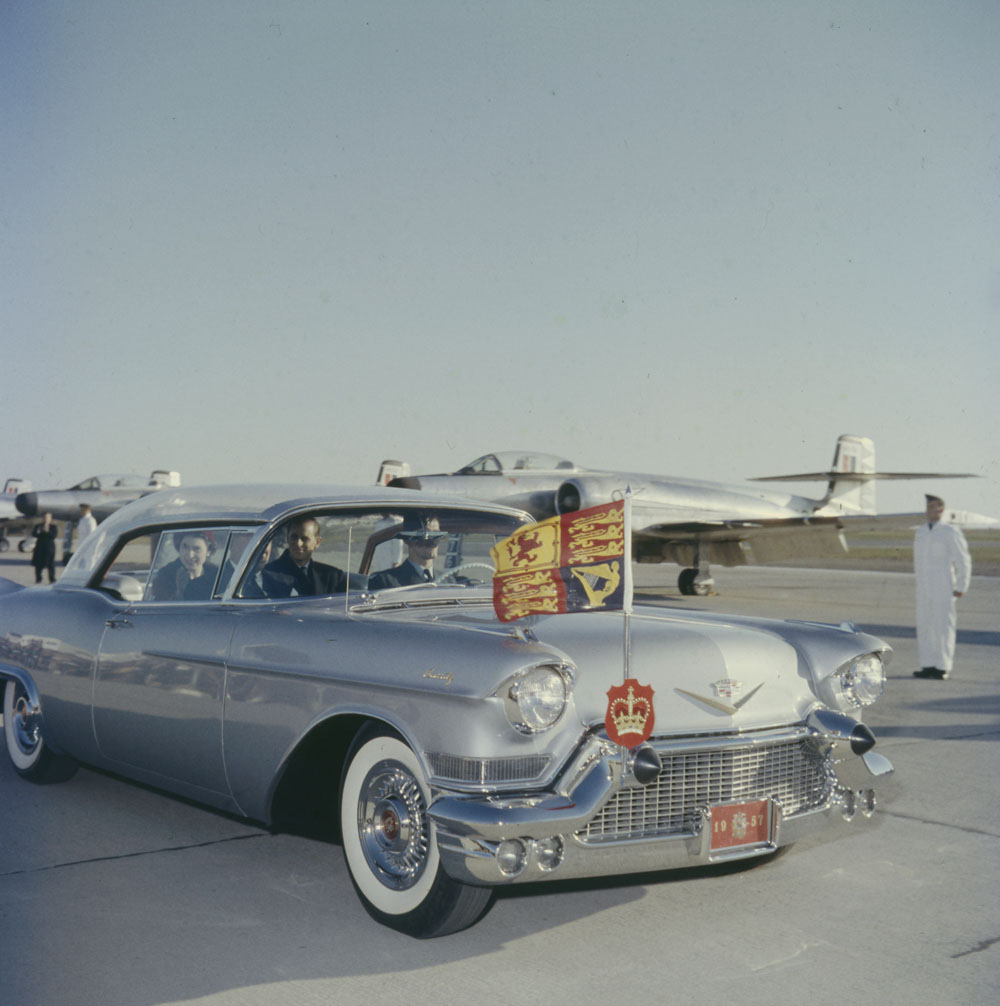
Royal visit to Canada

- Queen Elizabeth II and Prince Philip, Duke of Edinburgh, arrived in Ottawa, the capital of Canada, for a royal visit.
- Died: Arlow Stout, 81, American botanist

== October 13, 1957 (Sunday) ==
- Egyptian troops landed in Latakia, Syria.
- Died:
  - Erich Auerbach, 64, German philologist
  - Erle P. Halliburton, 65, American oil field businessman, founder of Halliburton
  - James McEntee, 73, American machinist and labor leader, second director of the Civilian Conservation Corps

== October 14, 1957 (Monday) ==
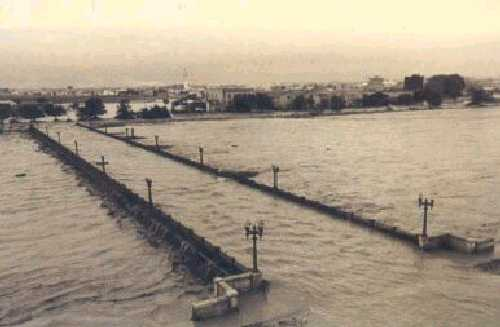
The Valencia flood

- A flood in Valencia, Spain, killed at least 81 people and caused extensive property damage.
- British racing driver Ronald Searles was killed in a fiery crash at the Monza Circuit in Italy.
- Queen Elizabeth II opened the Canadian Parliament, the first monarch to do so.
- The American Rocket Society presented President Eisenhower with a suggested program for outer space exploration. They proposed the establishment of an Astronautical Research and Development Agency similar to the NACA and the United States Atomic Energy Commission. This agency would have responsibility for all space projects except those directly related to the military services. A list of proposed projects was presented at an estimated cost of $100 million per annum.
- Died:
  - Charles G. Johnson, 77, Swedish-born American politician, California State Treasurer
  - Helena Normanton, QC, 74, first female barrister in the United Kingdom
  - Raymond Renefer, 78, French painter
  - Joseph H. Stotler, 69, American Thoroughbred racing trainer
  - Dudley A. White, 56, American newspaper publisher and politician, member of the United States House of Representatives from Ohio

== October 15, 1957 (Tuesday) ==
- A "Round 3" conference involving studies for a follow-on to the X-15 program, which subsequently led to the X-20 Dyna Soar, was held at the Ames Aeronautical Laboratory from October 15 to 21. During the course of the meeting, Alfred J. Eggers of Ames advanced several proposals for possible crewed satellite vehicle development projects.
- Born:
  - Mira Nair, Indian-born American filmmaker; in Rourkela, Orissa, India
  - Stacy Peralta, American director and skateboarder; in Venice, California
- Died:
  - Neal Ball, 76, American Major League Baseball shortstop
  - André Marquis, 73, French Vichyist admiral
  - Henry van de Velde, 94, Belgian artist, architect and art theorist

== October 16, 1957 (Wednesday) ==
- Queen Elizabeth II departed Ottawa and arrived in Williamsburg, Virginia, on her North American tour.
- Died:
  - Marion Bachrach, 58–59, American communist, sister of John Abt, died of cancer.
  - Ralph Benatzky, 73, Austrian composer

== October 17, 1957 (Thursday) ==
- Continuing her American tour, Queen Elizabeth II arrived in Washington, D.C.

== October 18, 1957 (Friday) ==
- In a ceremony at the White House, Prince Philip received the gold medal of the National Geographic Society.
- Two United States Navy balloonists flew to an altitude of almost 16 miles (26 km), landing near Hermansville, Michigan.
- Born: Catherine Ringer, French musician, dancer and actress, co-founder of Les Rita Mitsouko; in Suresnes, France
- Died:
  - Eugene Cunningham, 60, American writer
  - Jagadisan Mohandas Kumarappa, 71, Indian author and parliamentarian
  - Hüseyin Cahit Yalçın, 82, Turkish writer, politician and journalist

== October 19, 1957 (Saturday) ==
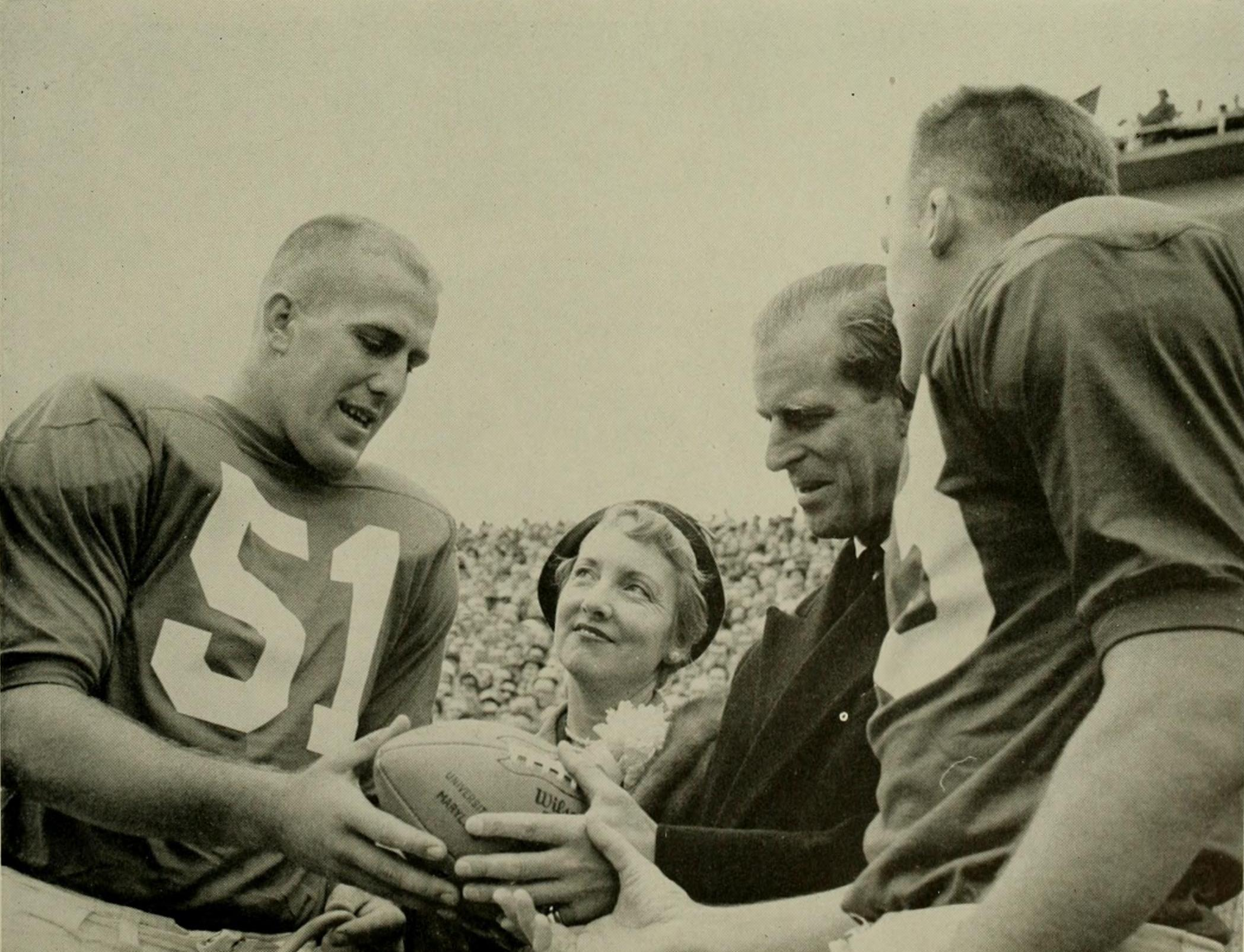
Prince Philip receives autographed football

- Queen Elizabeth II and Prince Philip attended an American football game in College Park, Maryland. They also visited a supermarket in West Hyattsville, Maryland.
- A helicopter crash in Farmingdale, New York, killed a beauty pageant winner on her way to her coronation and injured two other people.
- Montreal Canadiens player Maurice Richard became the first player in the history of the National Hockey League to score 500 career goals in a 3-1 home victory over the Chicago Black Hawks.
- Died: V. Gordon Childe, 65, Australian archaeologist, committed suicide by jumping.

== October 20, 1957 (Sunday) ==
- Two trains collided at Yarımburgaz in Turkey; 95 people died.
- Born: Manuel Huerga, Spanish film director and screenwriter; in Barcelona, Spain
- Died:
  - Jack Buchanan, 66, British actor, died of spinal cancer.
  - Paul Dyer Merica, 68, American metallurgist, died of a heart attack.

== October 21, 1957 (Monday) ==
- Queen Elizabeth II and Prince Philip arrived in New York City.
- Born:
  - Wolfgang Ketterle, German physicist, Nobel Prize laureate; in Heidelberg, West Germany
  - Steve Lukather, American guitarist, singer, songwriter, arranger and record producer (Toto); in San Fernando Valley, California
- Died:
  - Michalis Dorizas, 71, Turkish-born Greek Olympic athlete and University of Pennsylvania professor
  - Joseph T. Rucker, 70, American cinematographer

== October 22, 1957 (Tuesday) ==
- Queen Elizabeth II and Prince Philip returned to the United Kingdom from their North American tour.
- Born: Daniel Melingo, Argentine musician; in Buenos Aires
- Died:
  - Mary Colum, 73, Irish literary critic, wife of Padraic Colum
  - Frederick R. Knubel, 60, president of the United Lutheran Synod of New York and New England, died of a heart ailment.

== October 23, 1957 (Wednesday) ==
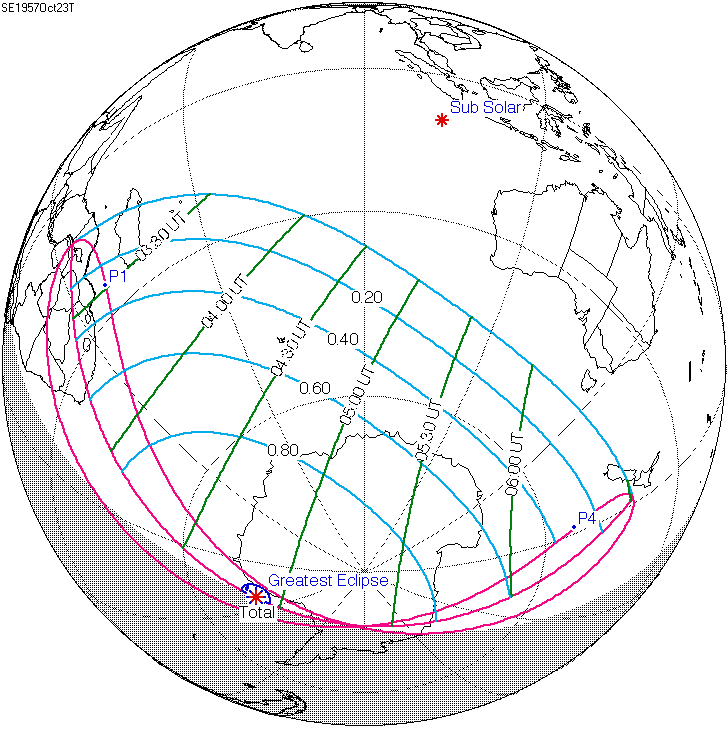
Total solar eclipse of October 23, 1957

- A total solar eclipse took place.
- A British European Airways (BEA) Vickers Viscount crashed at Nutts Corner Airport in County Antrim, Northern Ireland, killing all seven people aboard.
- Herbert Brownell Jr. resigned as United States Attorney General. William P. Rogers, the United States Deputy Attorney General, was chosen to succeed him.

The new seal

- President Eisenhower approved the design for the seal of the United States Department of the Navy.
- Born: Paul Kagame, 4th President of Rwanda; in Tambwe, Gitarama Province, Ruanda-Urundi
- Died:
  - Clarence Alcott, 71, American college football player, coach and investment banker
  - Frederick Burton, 86, American actor
  - Abe Lyman, 60, American bandleader and songwriter

== October 24, 1957 (Thursday) ==
- In the 1957 Ipswich by-election, Labour Party candidate Dingle Foot defeated Conservative candidate John C. Cobbold and Liberal candidate Manuela Sykes for the Ipswich constituency in the House of Commons.
- Born:
  - John Kassir, American actor and comedian; in Baltimore, Maryland
  - Lydia Nyati-Ramahobo, Motswana linguistic scholar and activist (d. 2025)
- Died:
  - Christian Dior, 52, French fashion designer, died of a heart attack.
  - Sir Harold Luxton, 69, Australian politician and businessman, died of hypertensive cardiovascular disease.

== October 25, 1957 (Friday) ==
- In New Jersey, former professional boxer Tippy Larkin was involved in a three-car accident in which a telephone worker was killed.
- Columbia Pictures released the film Pal Joey, directed by George Sidney and starring Rita Hayworth and Frank Sinatra, based on the musical comedy of the same name.
- Born: Nancy Cartwright, American voice actress (Bart Simpson from The Simpsons); in Dayton, Ohio
- Died:
  - Albert Anastasia, 55, American gangster, was murdered in a barbershop at the Park Sheraton Hotel in Manhattan.
  - Lord Dunsany, 79, Irish fantasy author
  - Kenneth McKellar, 88, member of the United States House of Representatives and United States Senate from Tennessee
  - George D. O'Brien, 57, member of the United States House of Representatives from Michigan

== October 26, 1957 (Saturday) ==
- On the same day he returned from an official visit to Albania and Yugoslavia, Marshal Georgy Zhukov, one of the greatest Soviet military heroes of World War II, was relieved of his position as Minister of Defence. The Soviet government allowed the news of Zhukov's removal to become known in western countries before releasing it to the Soviet public.
- Sputnik 1's batteries ran out by the end of its 326th orbit, and it ceased broadcasting signals.
- Born:
  - Julie Dawn Cole, English actress; in Guildford, Surrey, England
  - Bob Golic, American National Football League defensive tackle; in Cleveland, Ohio
- Died:
  - Gerty Cori, 61, Austrian-born biochemist, recipient of the Nobel Prize in Physiology or Medicine
  - Nikos Kazantzakis, 74, Greek writer
  - William P. Lambertson, 77, member of the United States House of Representatives from Kansas
  - Henry Augustus Pilsbry, 94, American biologist, malacologist and carcinologist

== October 27, 1957 (Sunday) ==
- Celâl Bayar was re-elected president of Turkey.
- Born:
  - Jeff East, American actor; in Kansas City, Missouri
  - Tsai Ming-liang, Malaysian-Taiwanese filmmaker; in Kuching, Crown Colony of Sarawak
- Died:
  - Joseph C. Baldwin, 60, United States Army officer and politician, member of the United States House of Representatives from New York
  - Giovanni Battista Caproni, 1st Count of Taliedo, 71, Italian aeronautical, civil and electrical engineer, aircraft designer and industrialist, died of a heart attack.
  - Tony Morabito, 47, American football executive, founder of the San Francisco 49ers, died of a heart attack.
  - Barney Peck, 56, American stockbroker, father of Stephen M. Peck

== October 28, 1957 (Monday) ==
- In the 1957 Israeli presidential election, the Knesset reelected Yitzhak Ben-Zvi, who was unopposed, as President of Israel.
- In Basutoland, flood waters swept a bus into the Tsaoing River, drowning fifty members of the Basuto tribe aboard the bus.
- Seven people died in an explosion at a powder factory near Oviedo, Spain.
- The crash of a Spanish DC-3 airliner south of Madrid killed all 21 passengers.
- No deaths or injuries were reported after a gas pipeline explosion near Riverdale, New Jersey.
- Dr. Richard C. Hubley, an American scientist, died of exposure at a glacier camp in Alaska while conducting research as part of the International Geophysical Year.
- Born:
  - Florence Arthaud, French sailor; in Boulogne-Billancourt, France (d. 2015, helicopter crash)
  - Ahmet Kaya, Turkish folk singer; in Malatya, Turkey (d. 2000, heart attack)
  - Rachel Levine, American pediatrician, United States Assistant Secretary for Health; in Wakefield, Massachusetts
  - Stephen Morris, British drummer (Joy Division, New Order); in Macclesfield, Cheshire, England
- Died:
  - Roy Keith Binney, 72, New Zealand architect and soldier

== October 29, 1957 (Tuesday) ==
- Moshe Dwek threw a hand grenade in the Knesset chamber during a foreign policy debate, injuring David Ben-Gurion, Moshe Carmel, Golda Meir and Rabbi Haim-Moshe Shapira.
- In the wake of the Turkish election two days earlier, riots in six different locations in Turkey resulted in three deaths and at least nine serious injuries.
- The crash of a U.S. Air Force Boeing KC-97 Stratofreighter tanker plane into a mountain 35 miles (56 km) north of Flagstaff, Arizona, killed all sixteen crewmembers.
- Born: Dan Castellaneta, American voice actor (Homer Simpson from The Simpsons); in Chicago, Illinois
- Died:
  - José Patricio Guggiari, 73, Paraguayan politician, 32nd President of Paraguay
  - Louis B. Mayer (born Lazar Meir), 73, Russian-born American film studio mogul, former head of Metro-Goldwyn-Mayer (MGM), died of leukemia.

== October 30, 1957 (Wednesday) ==
- Symphony No. 11 (The Year 1905) by Dmitri Shostakovich received its world premiere in Moscow.
- Born:
  - Richard Jeni, American stand-up comedian and actor; in Brooklyn, New York City (d. 2007, suicide by firearm)
  - Aleksandr Lazutkin, Russian cosmonaut; in Moscow
  - Kevin Pollak, American actor; in San Francisco, California
- Died: Herman Welker, 50, United States Senator from Idaho

== October 31, 1957 (Thursday) ==
- Studios throughout Hollywood observed one minute of silence at 11:59 a.m. in memory of Louis B. Mayer.
- Born:
  - Brian Stokes Mitchell, American actor and singer; in Seattle, Washington
  - Rupert Lowe, British politician, Minisiter of Parliament; in Oxfordshire
  - Shirley Phelps-Roper, American political and religious activist (Westboro Baptist Church); in Topeka, Kansas
  - Robert Pollard, American musician; in Dayton, Ohio
- Died:
  - Martha Black OBE, 91, American-born Canadian politician and naturalist
  - Peter G. Gerry, 78, American lawyer and politician, member of the United States House of Representatives and United States Senate from Rhode Island
  - Robert Livingston Gerry Sr., 80, American businessman, older brother of Peter G. Gerry
  - Helena Willman-Grabowska, 87, Polish Indologist, Sorbonne and Jagiellonian University professor
