= Graziano Gasparini =

Venezuelan architect (1924–2019)

Graziano Gasparini in 1954.

Graziano Gasparini (31 July 1924 – 30 November 2019) was a Venezuelan architect, photographer, painter and historian, sometimes referred to as Graciano Gasparini (ie using a Spanish version of his first name).

== Life ==
Gasparini was born in Gorizia, on the Italian–Slovenian border, in 1924. After completing his education in Venice, he worked for Carlo Scarpa in connection with the Biennale. After a break caused by the Second World War, the famous exhibition resumed in 1948, and Gasparini first visited Venezuela that year while promoting it. He settled in Caracas and pursued a career as an architect.

He specialised in restoring Spanish Colonial architecture, while developing a parallel career as an architectural historian. The buildings he worked on include the Bolivarian Museum in Caracas, which was inaugurated in 1960.

His scholarship was recognised by the award of a Guggenheim Fellowship in 1987.

He died in Caracas, aged 95.

== Personal life ==
=== Marriages ===
Gasparini's first wife was the Venezuelan sociologist Olga Lagrange, who died in 1971.

Some of his publications were written jointly with his second wife, the American anthropologist Luise Margolies.

=== Brother ===
His brother Paolo Gasparini (1934, Gorizia, Italy) was trained as a photographer within the Italian neorealist current, at the beginning of the fifties. In 1955 he settled in Venezuela.

== Bibliography ==
Beginning with a survey of Spanish Colonial churches in Venezuela (Templos coloniales de Venezuela. Caracas, 1959), he published on a variety of topics related to Latin American architecture, including prehispanic and indigenous traditions. Caracas a través de su arquitectura remains the only compendium on the history of architecture of Venezuela's capital.

- Templos coloniales de Venezuela. Graziano Gasparini. 1959
- Caracas a través de su Arquitectura. Graziano Gasparini and Juan Pedro Posani (1969)
- Inca Architecture. Graziano Gasparini and Luise Margolies. (English translation 1980)
- Las fortificaciones del período hispánico en Venezuela. Graziano Gasparini (1985)
- Arquitectura colonial iberoamericana. Graziano Gasparini, editor (1997)
- Arquitectura Indigena de Venezuela. Graziano Gasparini and Luise Margolies (2005). An excerpt La Vivienda Colectiva de los Yanomami appears in "Tipití: Journal of the Society for the Anthropology of Lowland South America": Vol. 2: Iss. 2, Article 1.
