= Alí Cordero Casal =

Venezuelan-American businessman and philanthropist

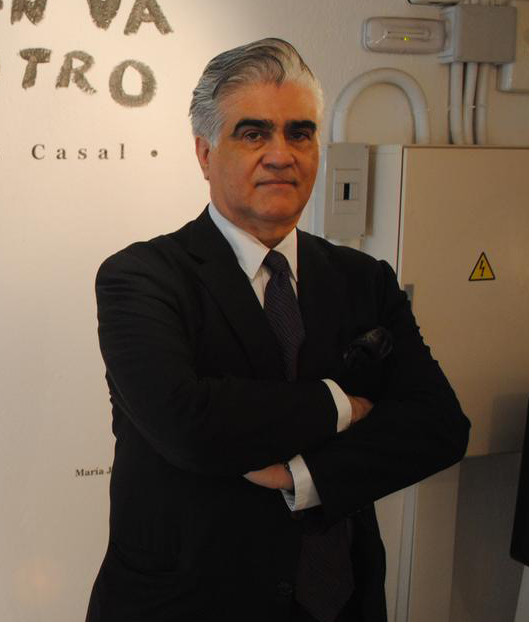
- Born: August 12, 1955 (age 71); Acarigua, Venezuela
- Occupations: Businessman, philanthropist, artist

Alí Cordero Casal (born August 12, 1955) is a Venezuelan-American businessman, visual artist, and philanthropist. He is known for his work in the local insurance brokerage industry and for founding Venezuelan American Endowment for the Arts (VAEA) in Venezuela and the United States.

== Early life and education ==
Cordero Casal was born in Acarigua, Portuguesa State, Venezuela. He is the third of five children of Waldemar Cordero Vale, a politician and rancher who served as governor of Portuguesa State, and Yuya Casal de Cordero. At the age of thirteen he traveled to the United States, where he was first exposed to a cultural environment that would shape his later involvement with the arts.

He earned a degree in Business Administration from the Universidad Católica Andrés Bello in Caracas.

== Business career ==
Cordero Casal is the founder and chairman of ACC Insurance Brokers Group, which developed operations in Venezuela, the United States, and Europe, including alliances with brokers associated with Lloyd's of London.

== Arts, collecting, and artistic practice ==
On December 22, 1987, Cordero Casal co-founded the Museo de Arte Acarigua-Araure (MAAA) as a private nonprofit institution in Acarigua, Venezuela. The museum promotes contemporary art, culture, and education through exhibitions and public programs, and maintains ties with local schools through workshops and educational activities. Since the mid-1990s, Cordero Casal has also maintained an independent artistic practice focused primarily on photography.

=== Venezuelan American Endowment for the Arts ===
On June 13, 1990, Cordero Casal founded The Venezuelan American Endowment for the Arts (VAEA), a New York-based nonprofit organization established to promote cultural exchange between Venezuela and the United States through the visual and performing arts. The founding date was chosen to commemorate the 200th anniversary of the birth of José Antonio Páez in Acarigua.

In 2012, VAEA established the Páez Medal of Art, an annual award presented to an individual or organization recognized for contributions to the arts in Venezuela and the United States. The award is named in honor of José Antonio Páez. Cordero Casal serves as chairman of the VAEA and presides over the award's annual bestowal ceremonies.
