= Caracas Cathedral =

- Catedral Metropolitana de Santa Ana
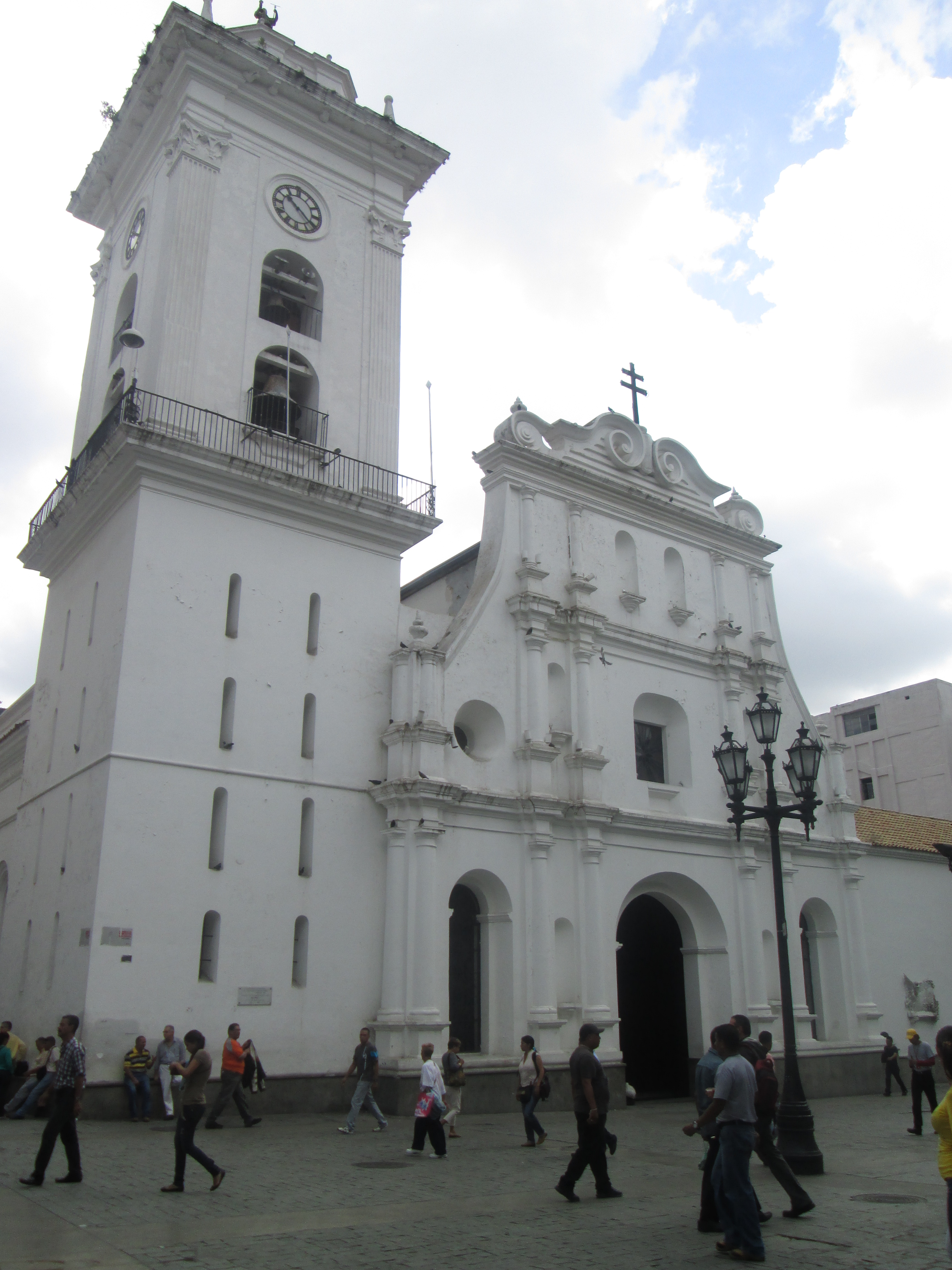
- Caracas Cathedral
- Caracas Cathedral
- 10.5062°N 66.9140°W
- Location: Caracas
- Country: Venezuela
- Denomination: Roman Catholic
- Website: www.arquidiocesisdecaracas.com

History
- Status: Cathedral
- Founded: 1666
- Dedication: Saint Anne

Architecture
- Functional status: Active
- Style: Romanesque

Clergy
- Archbishop: Cardinal Jorge Urosa Savino

The Caracas Cathedral or Metropolitan Cathedral of Saint Anne is the seat of the Roman Catholic Metropolitan archdiocese of Caracas, located on the Plaza Bolívar in Caracas, Venezuela. Its chapel of the Holy Trinity is the burial site of the parents and wife of Simón Bolívar. The Nuestra Senora de Venezuela y Santa Ana is a square (cuadra) situated between the cathedral and the central plaza, which is walled on three sides, but open to the east where it faces the cathedral.

== History ==
The church originally built at this location in the mid-17th century was a mud-walled chapel and dedicated to St. James (Santiago). It was destroyed during the earthquake of 1641. The building has undergone rebuilding, restoration, or expansion on numerous occasions since. The first construction of the cathedral replacing the small church commenced in 1666 under Juan de Medina, and a bell tower was added. Construction was completed in 1674. The façade, dating from 1771, is the work of Francisco Andrés de Meneses. The building was again damaged in the earthquakes of 1766 and 1812. At 4 pm on Holy Thursday, 26 March 1812, an earthquake measuring 7.7 magnitude on the Richter scale struck Caracas. Worshippers had assembled in large numbers at the church when the earthquake struck. The cathedral crumbled, killing a few people and injuring many. The priests explained it as divine retribution for Francisco de Miranda's rebellion and the devout parishioners agreed with them even though Simón Bolívar told the people not to panic as it was merely an earthquake.

After the earthquake, one of its towers was damaged and later reduced in size. A frontispiece was constructed in the facade in 1866. The cathedral houses crypt chambers, the most notable of which is the Bolívars', as his parents and young bride are entombed here. Simón Bolívar's remains were also entombed here from 1842 until 1876 when they were solemnly transferred to the Panteón Nacional, five blocks to the north. In 1932 and during the 1960s, restoration and modifications were made throughout the building. Juan Bautista Plaza served as the chapel master and organist until 1948. In 1974, the cathedral parish's marriage registry for the period 1615–1831 was published by the Instituto Venezolano de Genealogia.

== Architecture and fittings ==
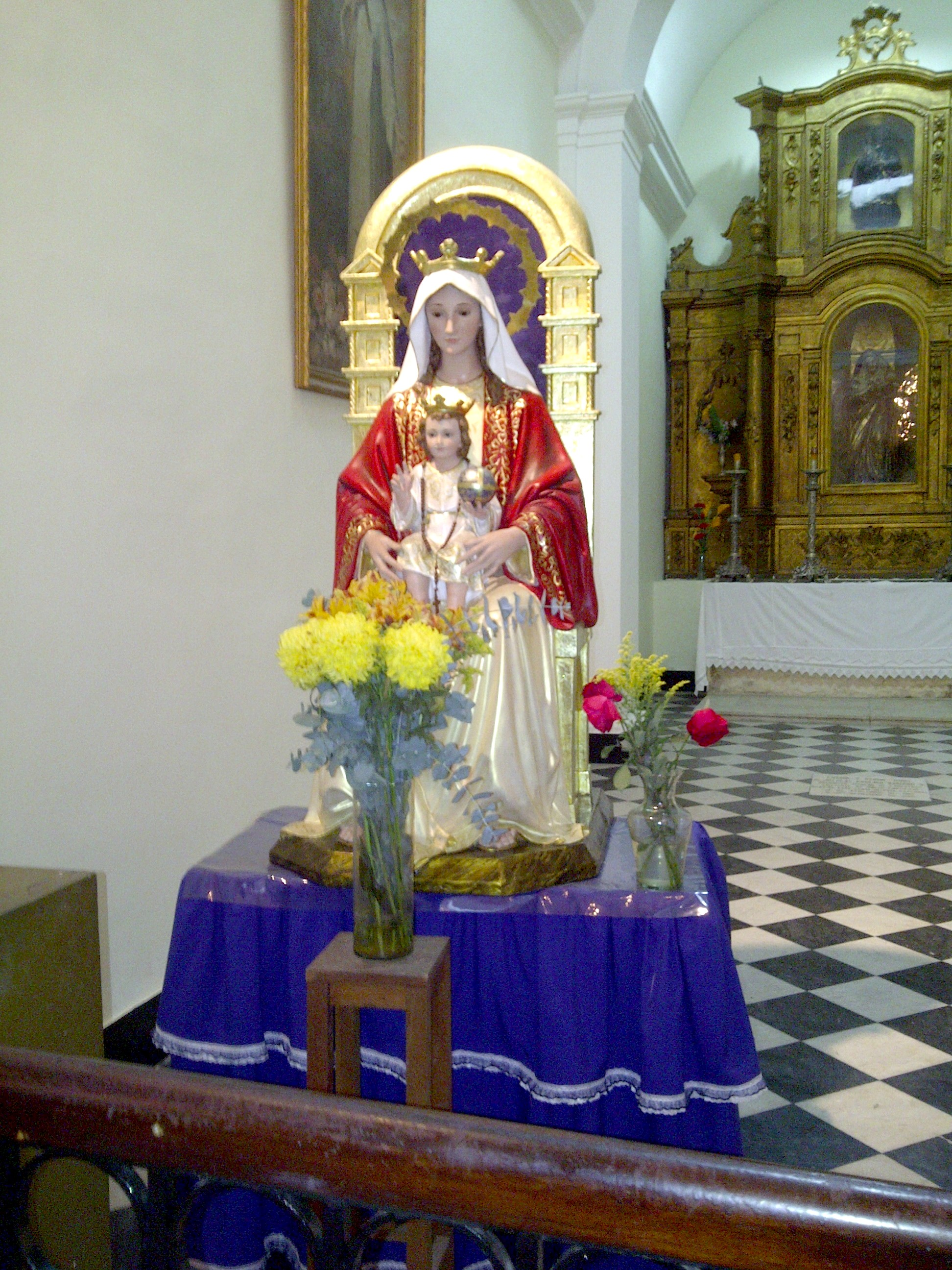
Statue of the Virgin of Coromoto

The structure is built from stone with a tile roof. Supported by 24 unadorned pillars, it measures 270 by 81 feet (82 m × 25 m). In 1812, it was noted that the brick steeple held the city's only public clock at the time.

The Romanesque plan consists of five naves: a central one and two minor ones on each side which makes the interior look wide. The central nave is separated from the lateral ones by 32 octagonal columns with composite capitals, supporting round arches; the columns were refurbished in the late 19th century. The main altar and altarpiece are inside the presbytery, located at the end of the central nave. The altars are gilded and the side chapels are elaborate in appearance. The prominent altar in the cathedral is of the Bolívar family which is prominently located at the centre, on the right aisle, which has a modern sculpture of Simon Bolívar titled "El Libertador" (The Liberator). There is also a colourful altar at the backyard of the cathedral.

The cathedral's organ was built in 1711 by the French immigrant, Claudio Febres. One of the baptismal fonts, which had been located at the cathedral and was used to baptize Simón Bolívar, the liberator of Venezuela, is now located in the courtyard at the home of this birth. The sacral art in the cathedral contains among others The Resurrection by Rubens, the Presentation of the Virgin by Murillo, and the Last Supper, an unfinished work by the Venezuelan painter Arturo Michelena.

== Notable people ==
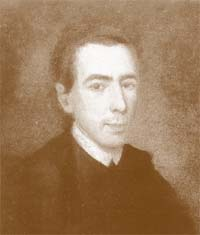
Pedro Palacios y Sojo was a prelate of the Caracas Cathedral in 1798–1799.

Notable figures in the cathedral's history include the isleño Manuel de Sosa Betancourt, who was its archdeacon. Carlos Herrera Mesones (1705–1761) was a canon and the cathedral's treasurer. Ambrosio de Carreno (1721–c.1801) served as the maestro di capilla during the period of 1750 through 1774. Before his 1789 ordination, Jose de la Luz Urbano (1755–1810) served as the cathedral's organist. José Cayetano Carreño (1774–1836) was the cathedral's organist from the age of 15 until his death. In 1796, José Ángel Lamas was appointed first bassoon in the cathedral's orchestra, and his most famous piece, Popule Meus premiered in the cathedral in 1801. Pedro Palacios y Sojo (1739–1799), cleric and composer, became prelate of the cathedral in 1798.

== Gallery ==
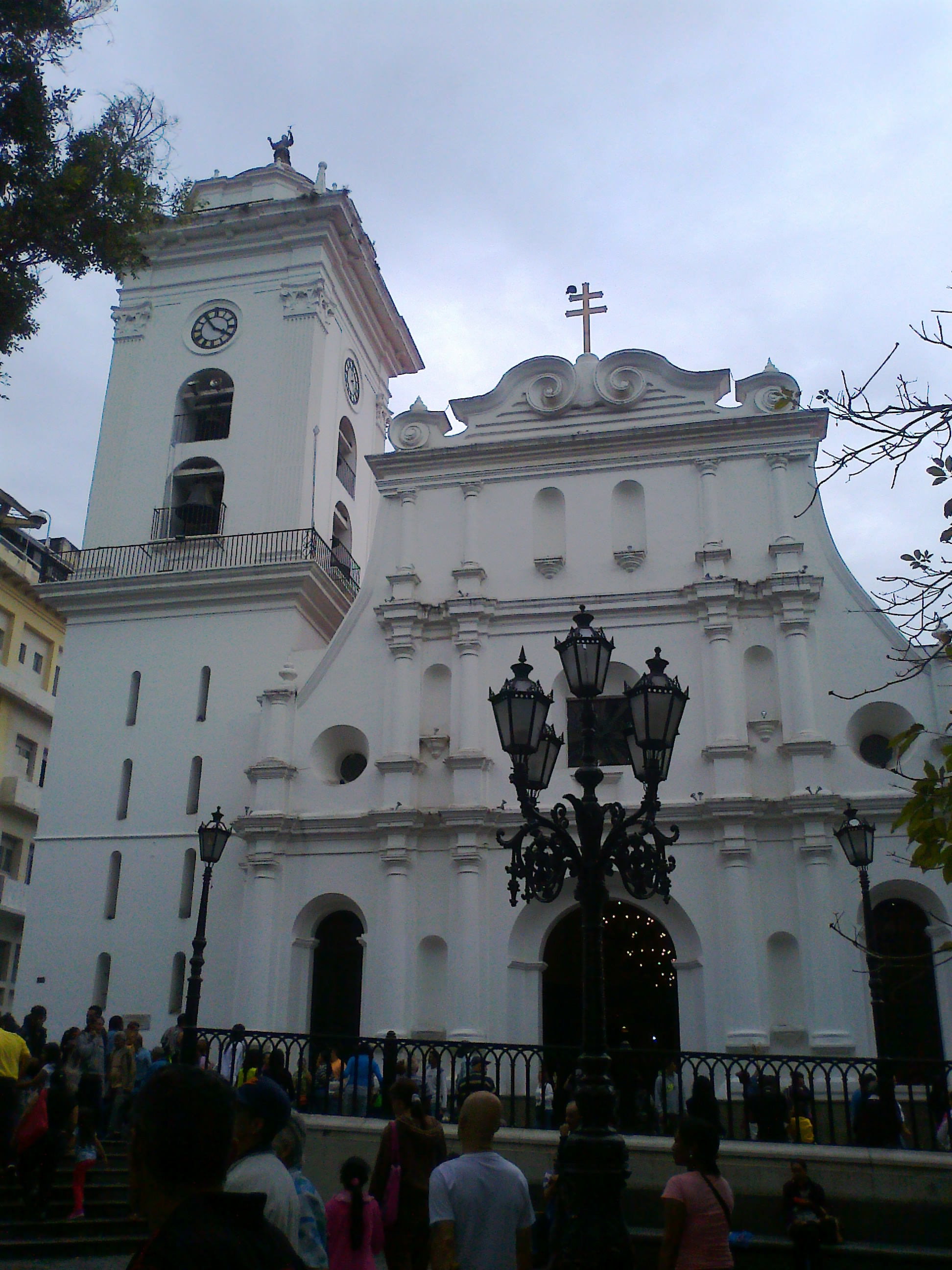
2017

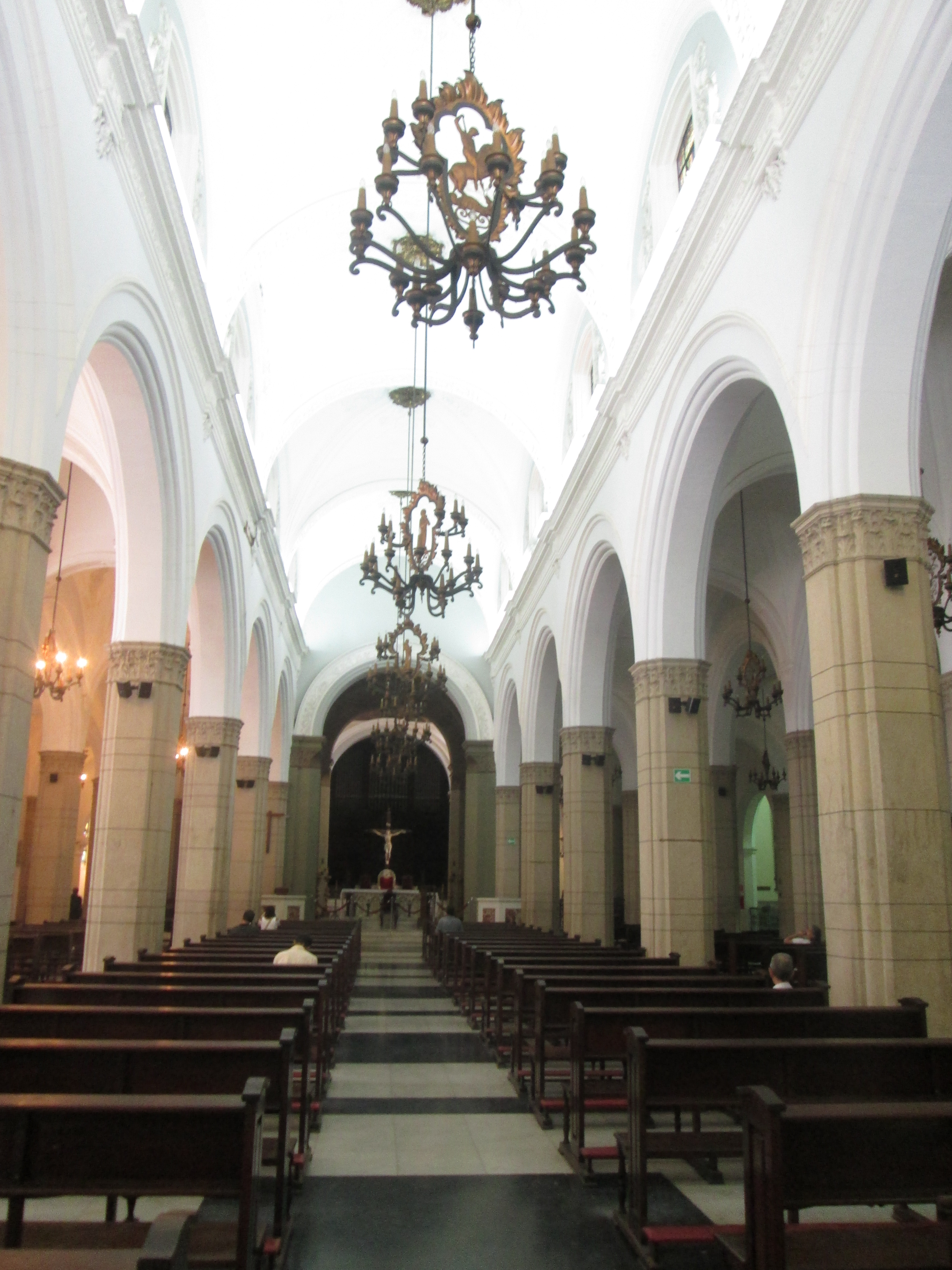
2013

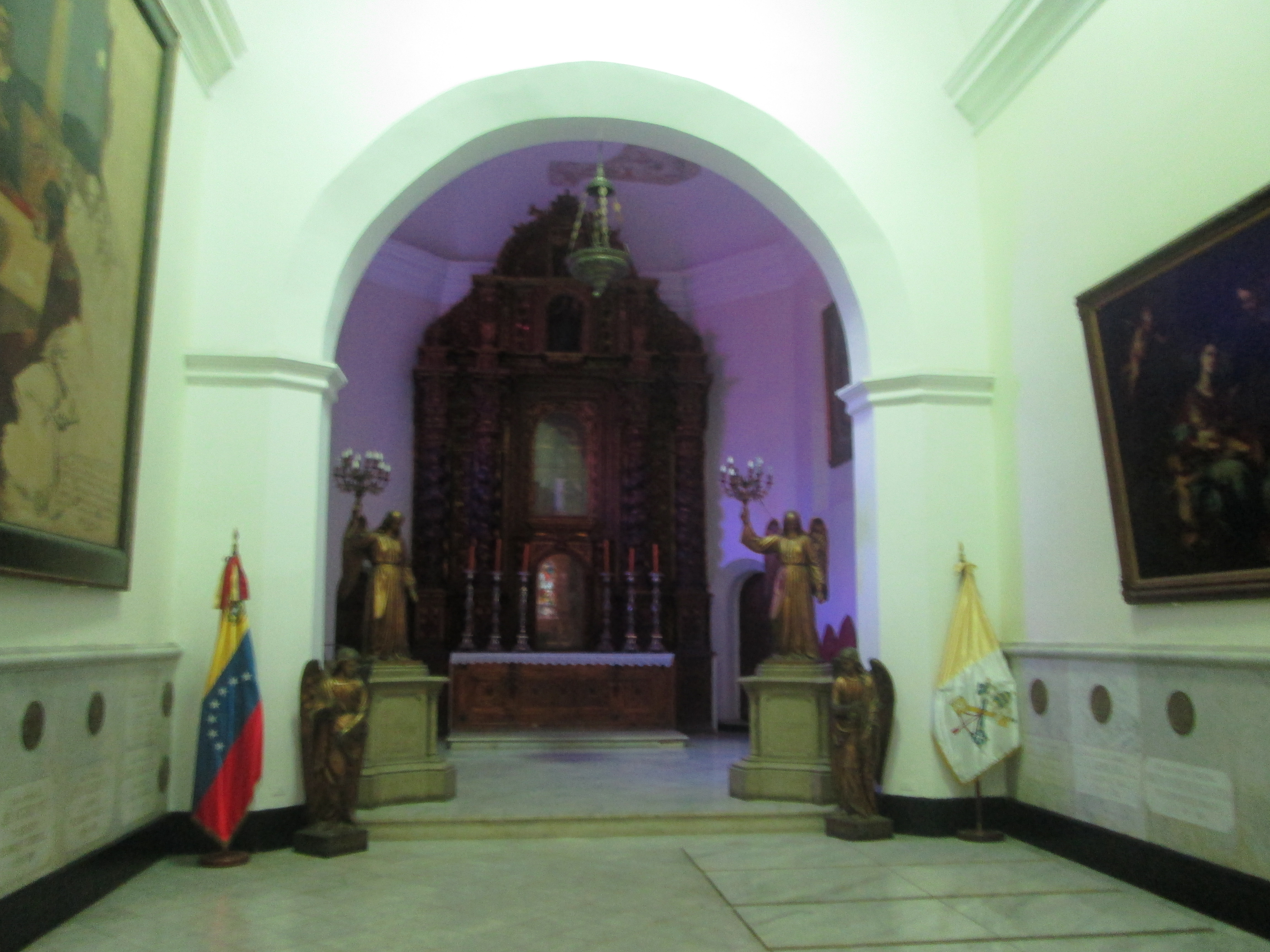
2013

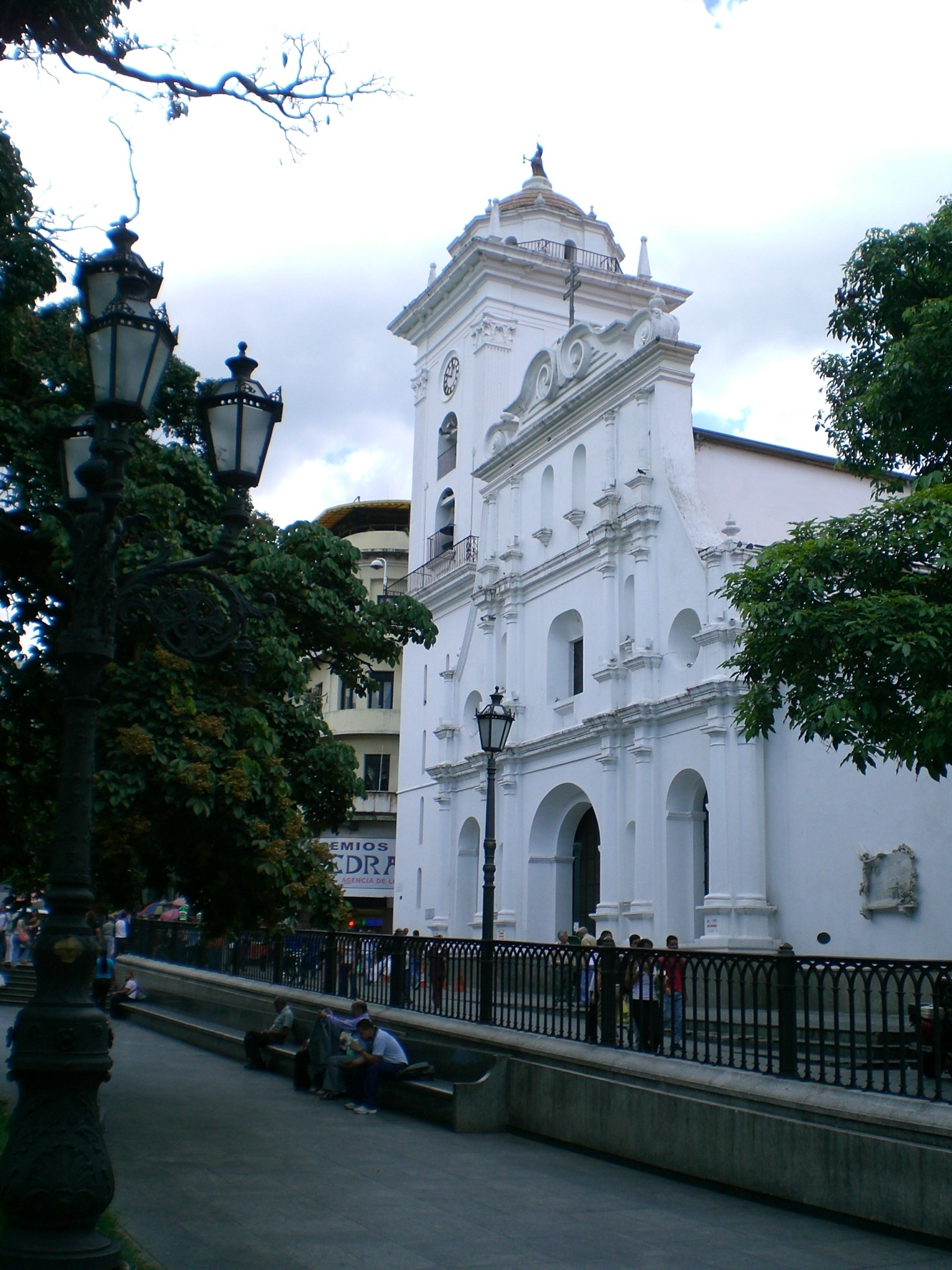
2007

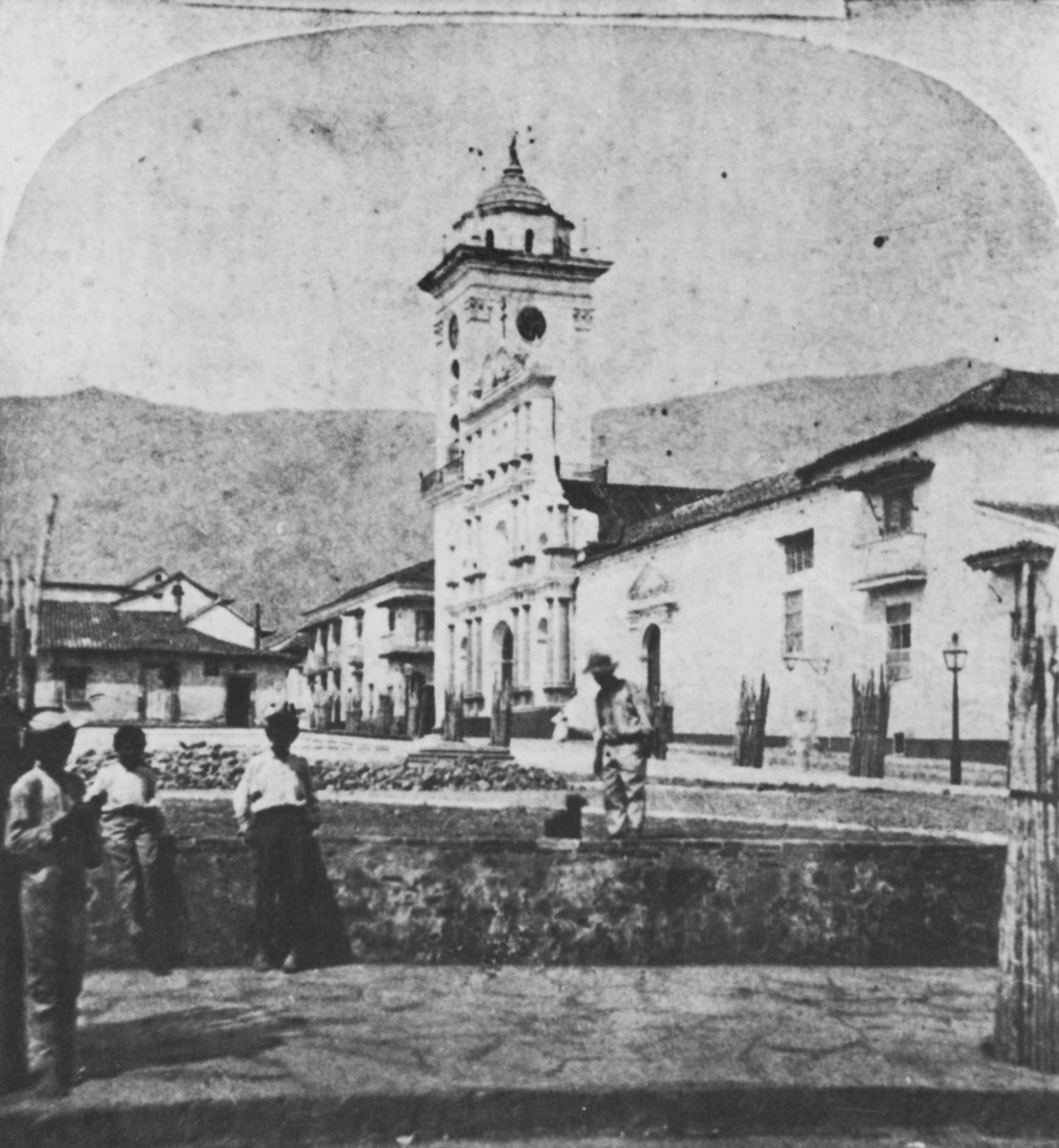
c. 1870

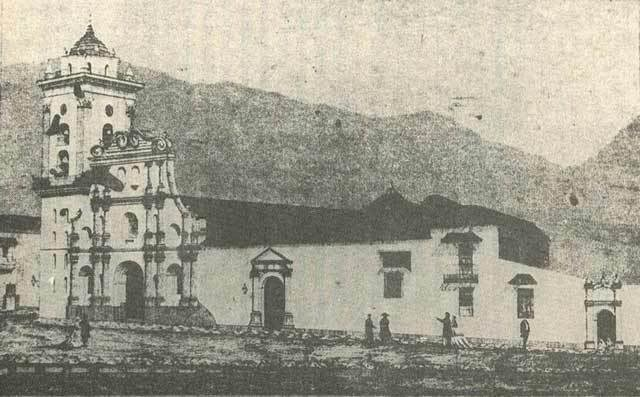
1867

== See also ==
- Catholic Church in Venezuela
- List of cathedrals in Venezuela
