= Bolivarian Museum =

Coordinates: 10.5047°N 66.9133°W

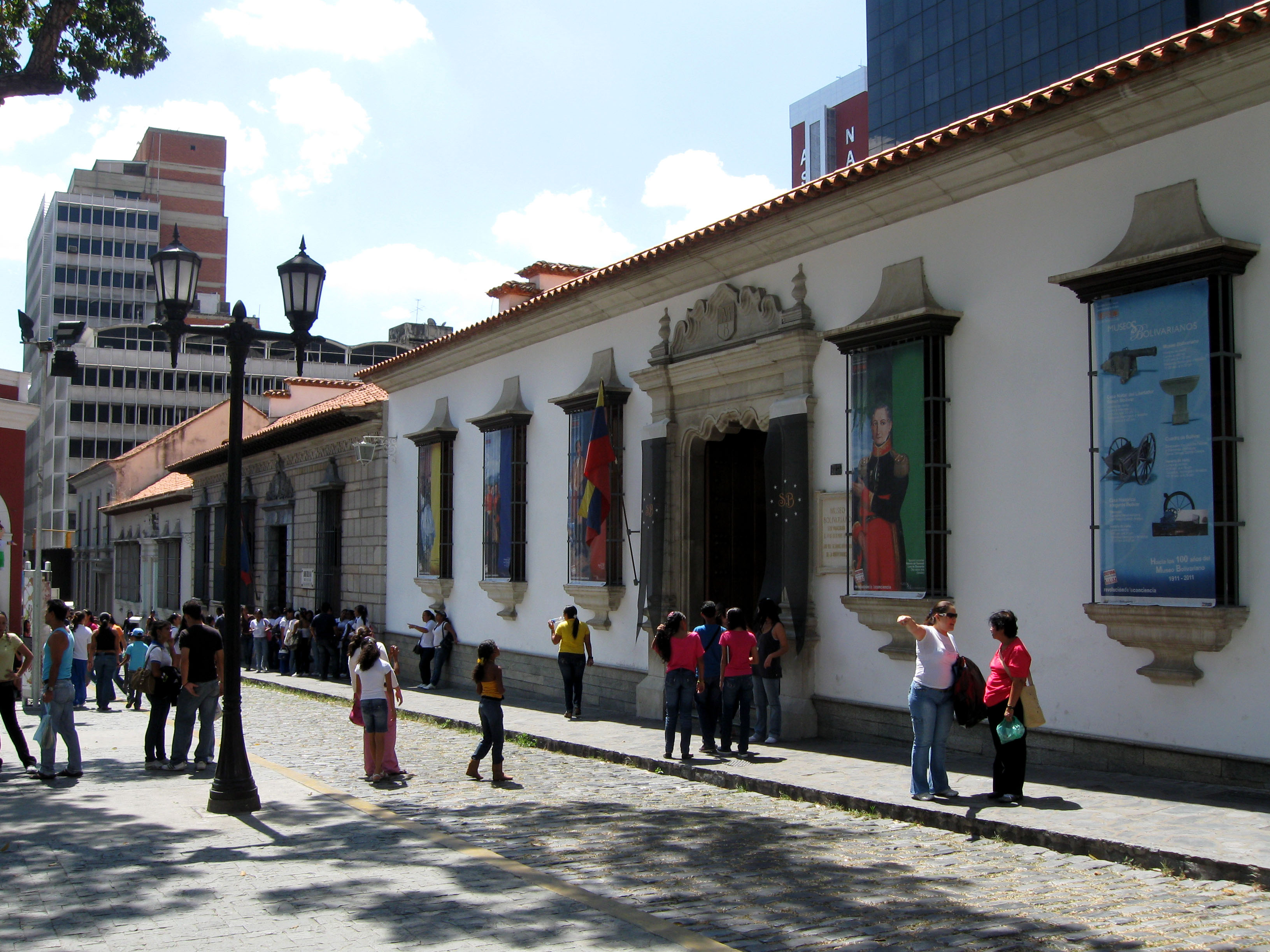
The facade of the Bolivarian Museum. Bolívar's birthplace is visible on the left.

The Bolivarian Museum (Spanish: Museo Bolivariano) is dedicated to Simón Bolívar, the hero of Latin American independence. It is situated in Caracas, Venezuela. The museum is run in tandem with the birthplace of Simón Bolívar next door. The collections include items related to Bolivar and Venezuelan independence.

== History ==
Many of the items in the museum were collected in the nineteenth century, and some of them were put on display in 1883 when President Guzmán Blanco organised an exhibition to celebrate the centenary of Bolívar's birth. In the twentieth century they were housed in a museum.

President Rómulo Betancourt decided to move the museum to its present site near the Plaza El Venezolano. The design of the single-storey structure was commissioned from the architect, Graziano Gasparini, who was already known for restoration work on Venezuela's Spanish Colonial church buildings. For the museum building he reconstructed a Spanish Colonial facade in keeping with the adjacent birthplace of Bolívar. It was inaugurated in 1960.

== Collections ==
The collections include the coffin in which Bolívar's remains were brought from Santa Marta to Caracas.

== See also ==
There are other museums named after Bolivar including a museum at Ziortza-Bolibar, Basque Country, Spain. See List of places and things named after Simón Bolivar for more places associated with Bolivar.
