= Birthplace of Simón Bolívar =

National historical monument of Venezuela in Caracas

Coordinates: 10°29′43″N 66°55′1″W

- Casa Natal del Libertador Simón Bolívar
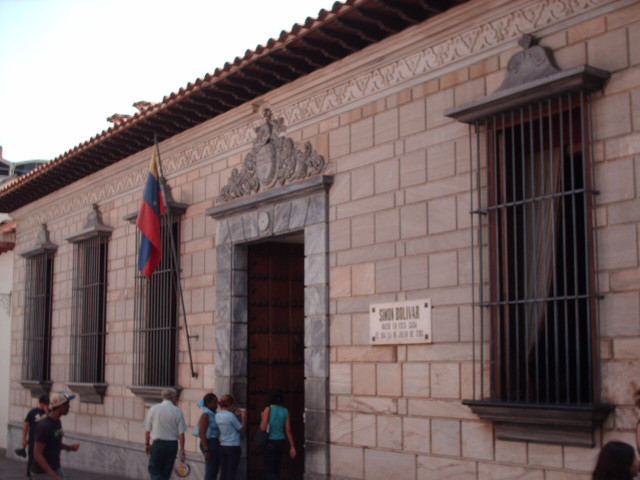
- Simón Bolívar's birthplace, Caracas

- Location within Venezuela

General information
- Architectural style: Spanish Colonial
- Location: Caracas, Venezuela, Venezuela
- Completed: 1643
- Inaugurated: 5 January 1921
- Renovated: 1920
- Client: Venezuelan government

Website
- https://casa-natal-del-libertador.webnode.com.ve/

The Birthplace of Simón Bolívar (Spanish: Casa Natal del Libertador Simón Bolívar) is a seventeenth-century house in the Venezuelan capital city Caracas where the hero of Venezuelan and Latin American independence, Simón Bolívar, was born. Now a significant tourist attraction, the building is located in a little street off the Plaza San Jacinto, a block east of the Plaza Bolívar. It is one of only a few houses from the colonial era which survive in central Caracas.

One of the adjacent buildings serves as a Bolivarian museum (museo bolivariano). The birthplace and museum together present memorabilia connected with Bolivar and the Venezuelan War of Independence, along with weapons and furniture of that period.

== History ==
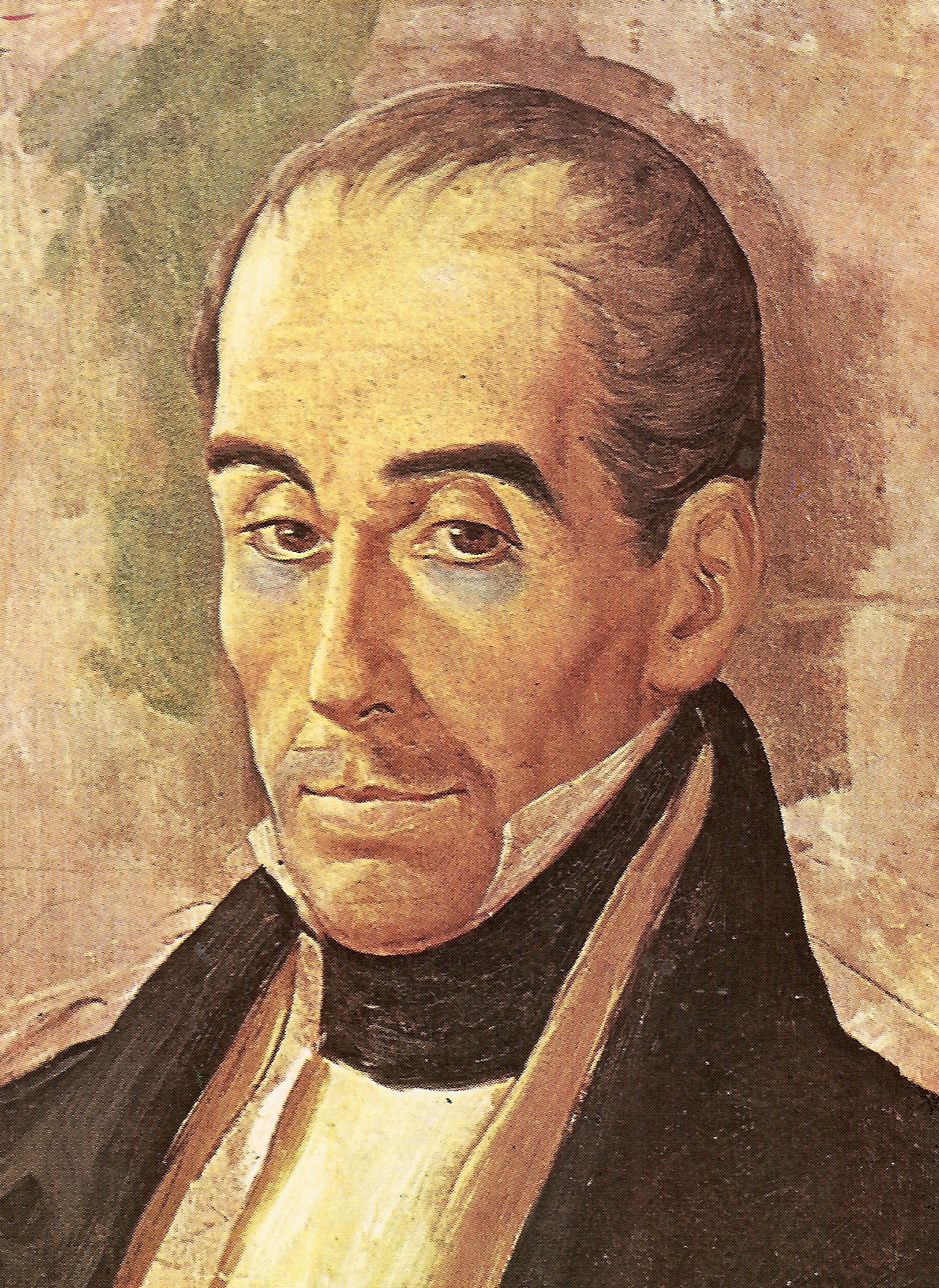
Portrait of Simón Bolívar in the house

The house on San Jacinto Street was completed in the 1640s. Bolivar was born to Doña María de la Concepción Palacios y Blanco and Coronel Don Juan Vicente Bolívar y Ponte in the bedroom here on 24 July 1783, and was the fourth child of the aristocratic couple of the Creole family who had migrated from Spain 200 years earlier. In 1806, the house was sold to a relation of Bolívar called Madriz. The house remained in his family until 1876 when it was bought by President Antonio Guzmán Blanco. Guzmán Blanco was an admirer of Bolívar, and erected his equestrian statue in the Plaza Bolivar.

Reconstruction of the house was ordered on October 28, 1916, with the purpose of preserving Venezuela's cultural heritage, and to honor its national hero, but it was not until 1920 when the house actually underwent reconstruction with added refinements. It was inaugurated on 5 January 1921 on the anniversary of the Battle of Carabobo. The building became a listed National Monument on 25 July 2002.

== Architecture ==
The single-storey building occupies a relatively narrow plot, 23 meters wide and 60 meters deep. It has wide corridors and courtyards and patios.

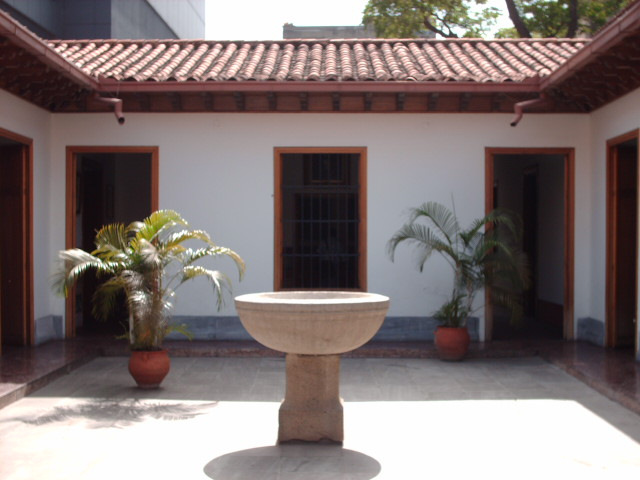
Courtyard at the main entrance

The reconstruction is Spanish Colonial in character, but the aim of the restorers was to enhance the building, rather than adopt criteria of strict authenticity. New materials were introduced; for example the facade facing the street has been refaced in stone, which is atypical of colonial-era houses in Venezuela. Other walls are whitewashed: the structure underneath is now made of brick, although it was probably made of adobe originally.

At the time of Bolívar's birth, the home was opulently furnished with mahogany chests and tables, upholstered chairs, decorated mirrors; damask curtains, gold cornices, and bright chandeliers. Period furniture and artifacts belonging to Bolívar can now be seen in the building. The house has a sequence of courtyards surrounded by corridors and rooms. In the main courtyard is the baptismal font used for Bolívar's baptism, originally located in Caracas Cathedral. The second courtyard serves as ventilation to the kitchen and other rooms, and includes a replica of a water fountain from the time of Bolívar. At the end of the house is a small pen-laundry and stable.

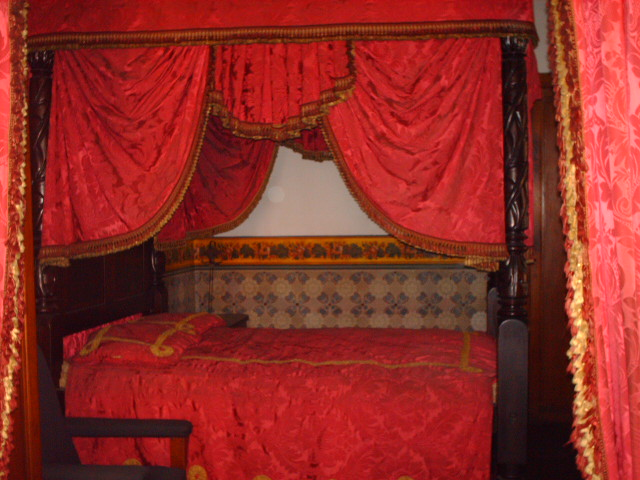
Bedroom

Among those which stand out are the main room, the bedroom (site where Simón Bolívar was born) and the cabinet, which occupy the front body of the building. They are decorated with murals executed by the painter Tito Salas. These very large paintings by Salas depict Bolívar's heroic battles and scenes during his life. In one painting at the house, Salas depicts Bolívar on a white mountain with a white bearded man with angel wings. There are also paintings of his life scenes by Martín Tovar y Tovar and Arturo Michelena, including his christening, wedding and death. There is also a tree in the backyard of the house, which is famous as it is said to be the location where Simon was taught by Rodríguez.

Bolivar's childhood mementos such as his library and personal records are also exhibited.

== Other homes of Bolívar ==
=== Venezuela ===
Despite the Venezuelan authorities' assertion that Bolívar was born in Caracas, there have been claims that the much poorer town of San Mateo, Aragua, was in fact his true birthplace. The claims are based on the fact that Bolívar's mother had certainly been living at the San Mateo ranch shortly before his birth and that as a child, Bolívar spent much of his time there.

There is also another family home of Bolivar which has historical importance. It was the venue where the independence movement was launched on 19 April 1810 after the freedom fighters had conspired to act during their first meeting at this home in 1818. Eventually, as result of this movement Venezuela got its independence from Spain, on 5 July 1815.

=== Colombia ===
- Quinta de Bolívar
- Quinta de San Pedro Alejandrino

== Gallerys ==
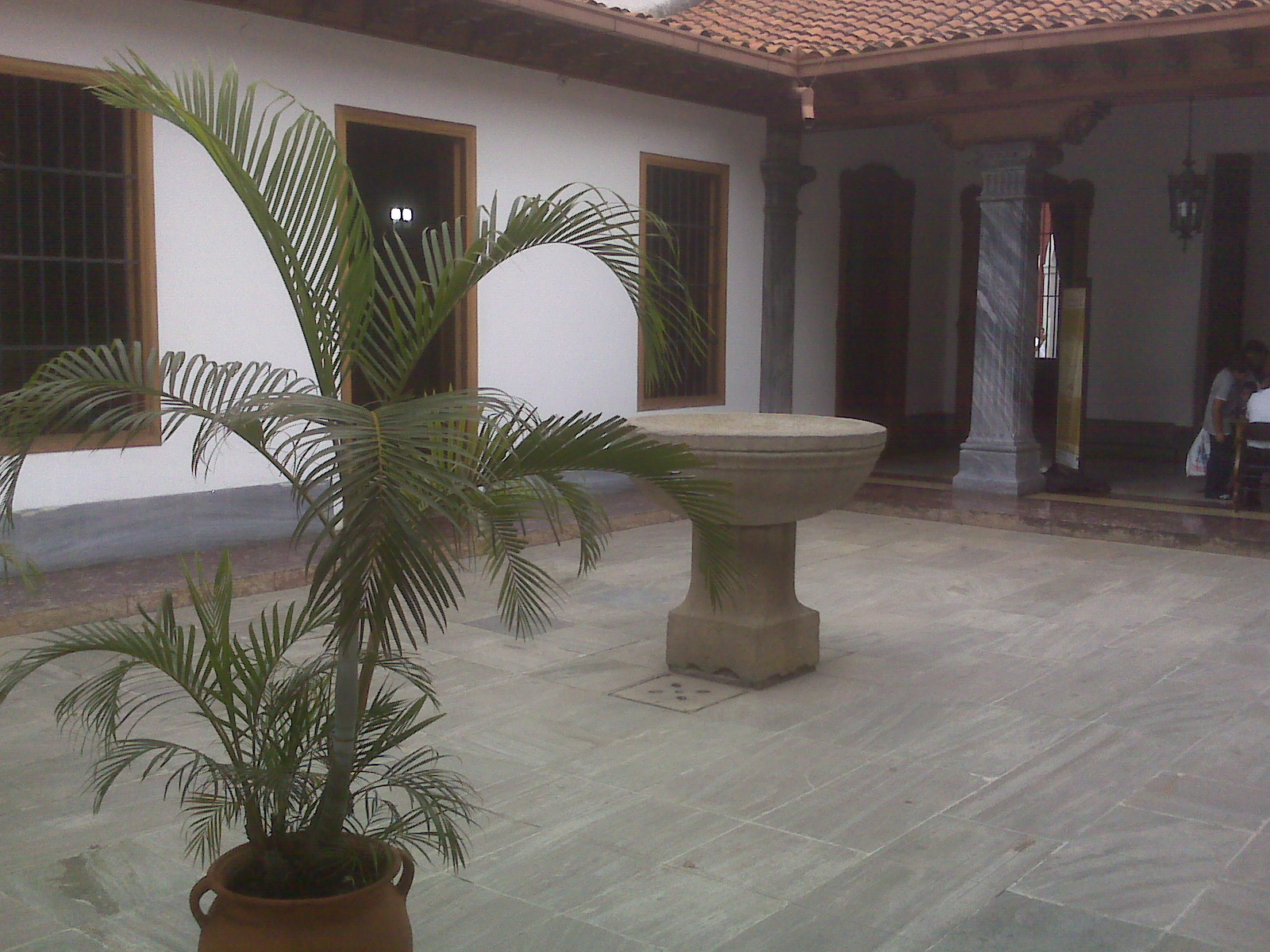
Other view of the main entrance.

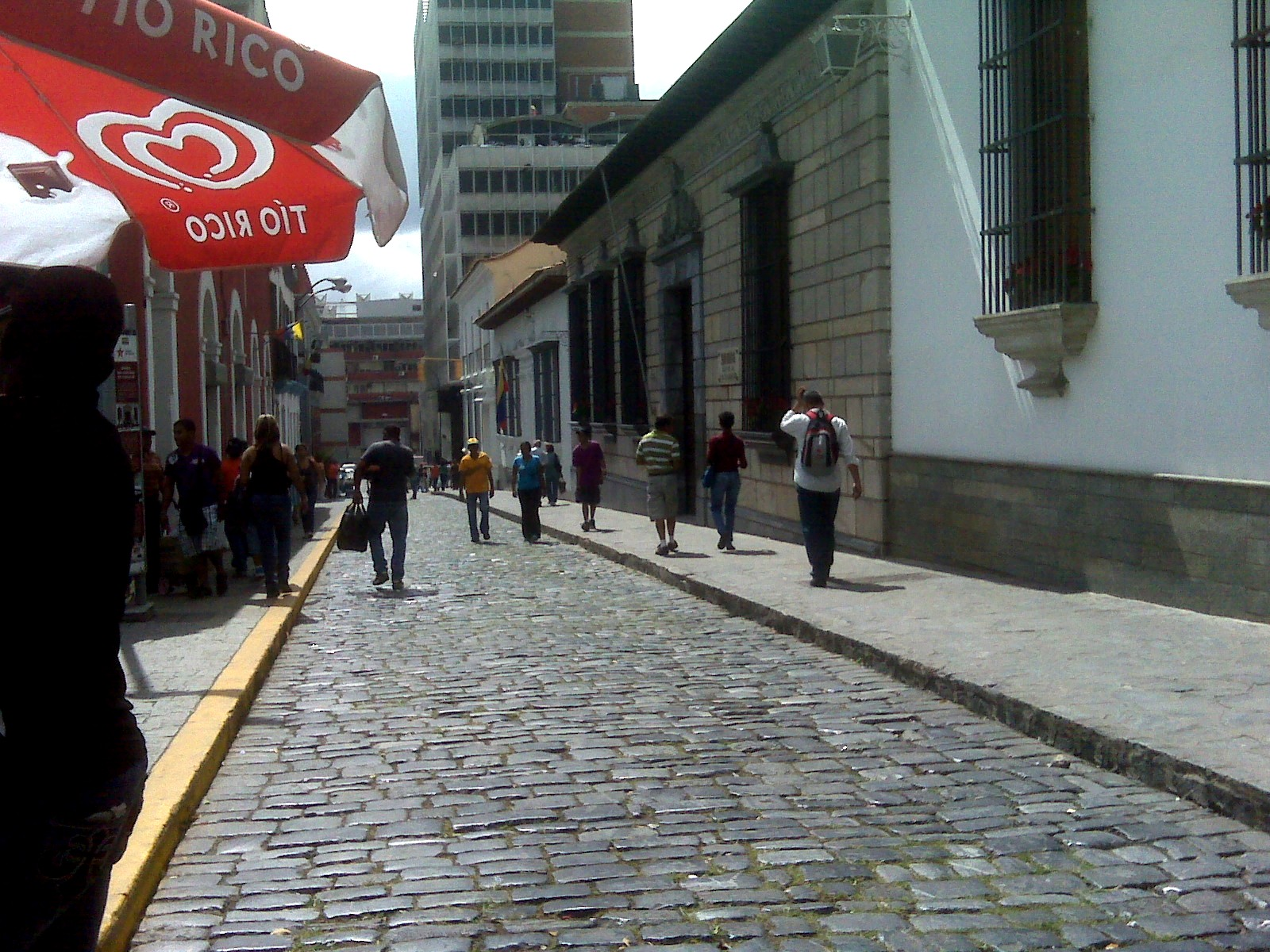
Street view of Casa Natal de El Libertador

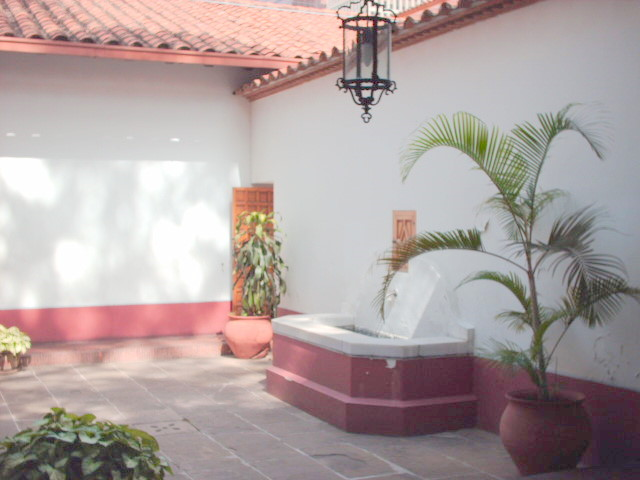
Second courtyard with the water fountain.

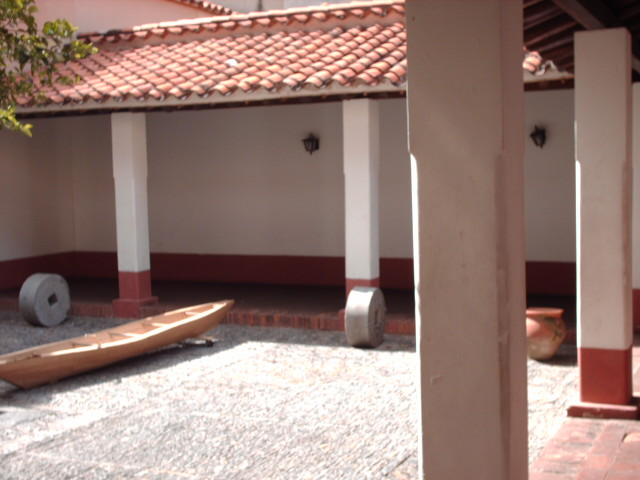
Rear of the house
