= Quinta de Anauco =

Colonial house and art museum in Venezuela

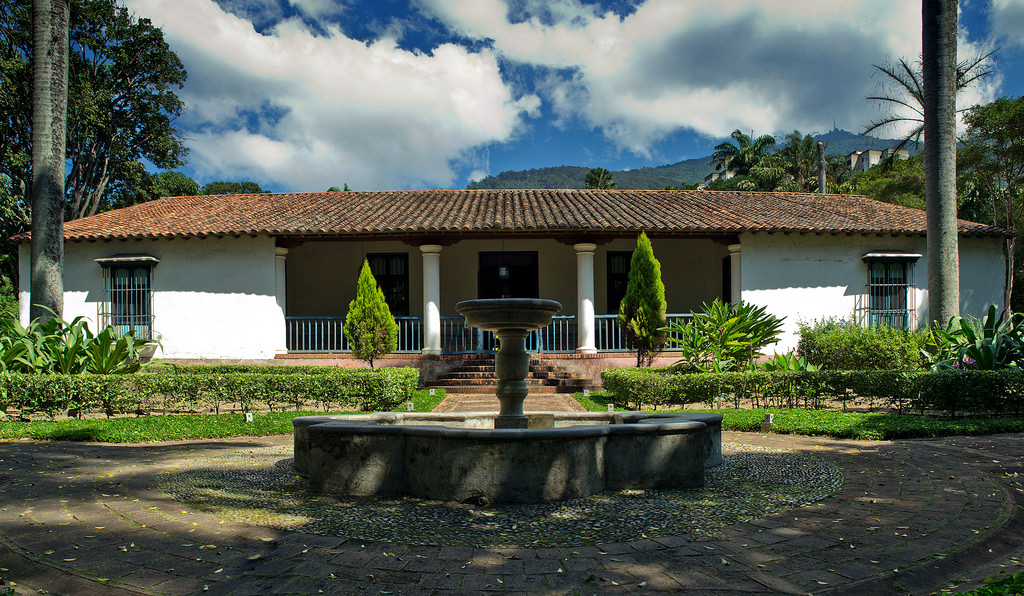
- Interactive map of the Quinta de Anauco area

General information
- Location: Caracas, Venezuela
- Coordinates: 10°30′43″N 66°53′59″W
- Year built: 1796–1797; 229 years ago

Website
- quintadeanauco.org.ve
- Caracas Museum of Colonial Art
- Museo de Arte Colonial de Caracas
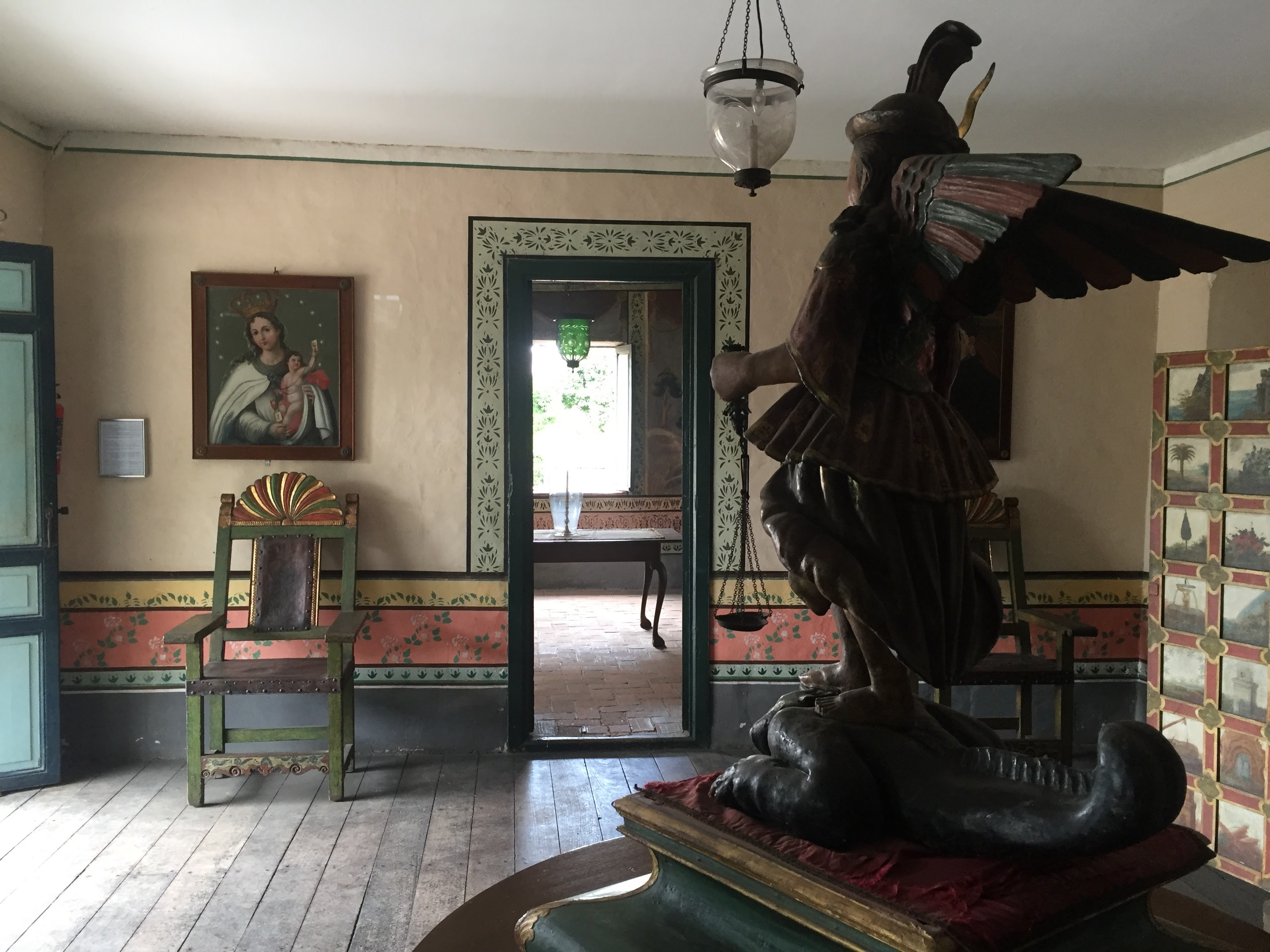
- Established: 28 October 1942; 83 years ago
- Type: Art museum

The Quinta de Anauco is a colonial house in Caracas, Venezuela, that since 1958 has housed the Caracas Museum of Colonial Art. The Quinta was built 1797, and hosted Simón Bolívar in 1827. In 1978 it was declared an Historic National Monument of Venezuela.

== History ==
The Quinta de Anauco was built by Juan Javier Mijares de Solórzano y Pacheco, on farmland he bought expressly for that purpose for 125 pesos on 9 December 1976. Construction finished in 1797, and the Quinta was initially known as the Solórzano House. The Quinta survived the 1812 Caracas earthquake, and remained property of Solórzano's son until 1821, when he fled with his mother to Curaçao following the victory of the republican army at the Battle of Carabobo. The Quinta became state property, and was leased to Pedro Zaraza in 1825, who died only seven days later.

=== Residence of the Marqués del Toro ===
In 1825, following the death of Zaraza, the Quinta de Anauco was leased to Francisco Rodríguez del Toro e Ibarra, the fourth Marqués del Toro, who had been a division general of the republican army during the Venezuelan war of independence. Simón Bolívar stayed with the Marqués at the Quinta in July 1827, and advised him to buy it. Rodríguez del Toro bought the Quinta in December 1827 for 3,250 pesos; at that point it acquired the name "Quinta de Anauco". He had the walls painted with murals and lived there until his death in 1851. In his will Rodríguez del Toro left the lower rooms and half the garden to his brother and sister, and the upper rooms and the remaining half of the garden to his nieces. The Quinta changed hands several times before being bought by Domingo Eraso for 5,000 pesos in 1860.

=== Recent history ===
The Quinta de Anauco belonged to the Eraso family until 1958, when they donated it to the Venezuelan state, under the condition that it house the Museum of Colonial Art, which had been founded in 1942.

In January 1978 the Quinta was declared an Historic National Monument of Venezuela.

== Museum of Colonial Art ==
The Museum of Colonial Art was founded by Alfredo Machado Hernández in Caracas on 28 October 1942. In 1953 the building housing the Museum was destroyed, and it closed. In June 1958 the Quinta de Anauco was donated to the state by the Eraso family. It was restored and opened as the Museum of Colonial Art on 12 October 1961.

In 2021 the Museum held an event to celebrate its 60th year at the Quinta, and four members of the Eraso family attended.
