= Museo de Arte Acarigua-Araure =

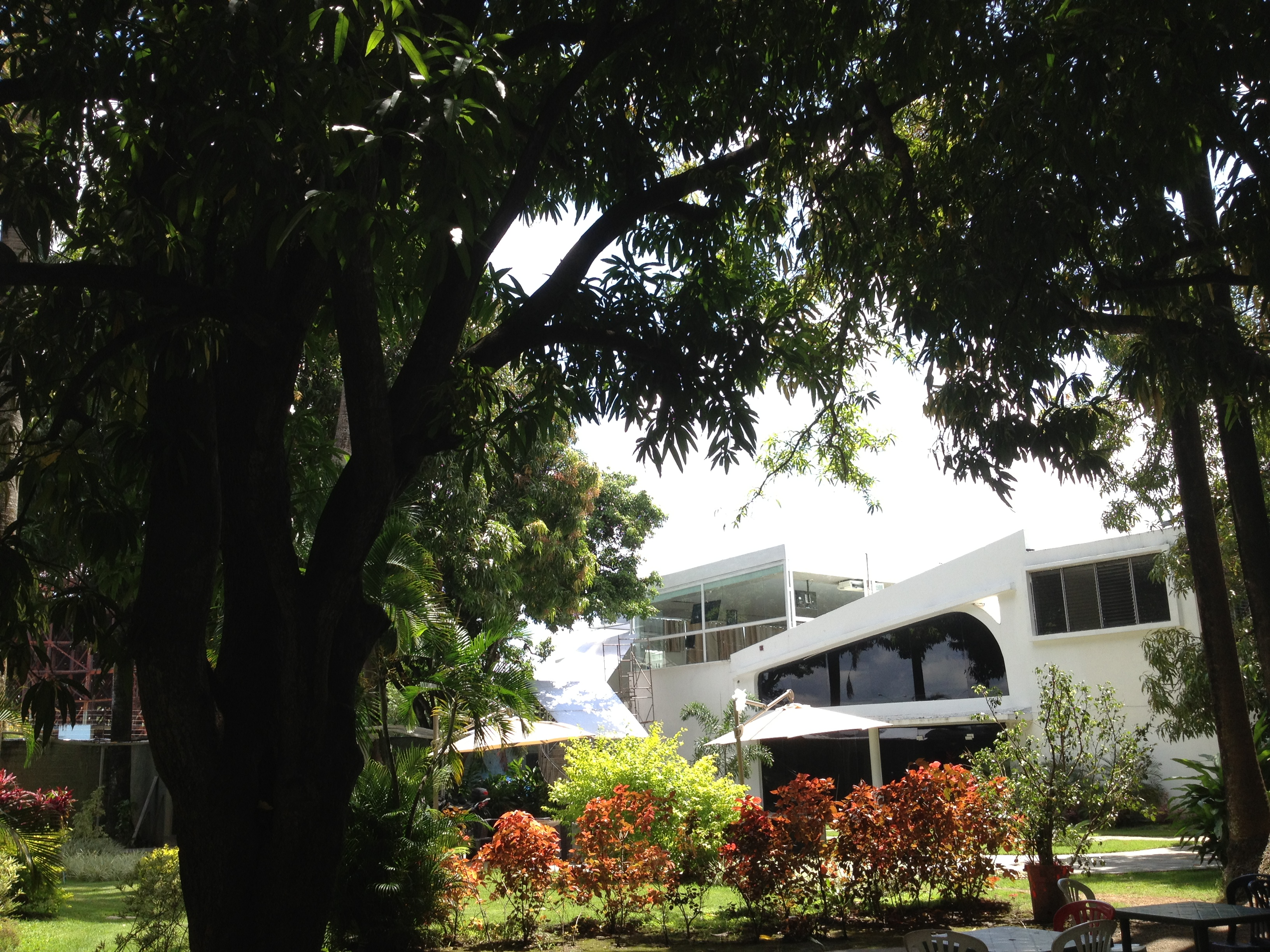
Museo de Arte Acarigua-Araure

The Museo de Arte Acarigua-Araure (MAAA) is a not-for-profit art institution in Acarigua, Venezuela. MAAA exhibits local and international contemporary art. The museum was founded in 1987 by Ali Cordero Casal to promote contemporary art, culture and education through exhibitions and public programs. Since its inception, MAAA has organized over 40 exhibitions of both local and international artists. Education is an important facet of MAAA's mission and the museum maintains close relationships with schools in the region through workshops and educational activities.

MAAA was recognized by the International Art Critics Association Venezuelan chapter in 2008.
