= Simón Bolívar (disambiguation) =

Simón Bolívar (1783–1830) was a Venezuelan military and political leader.

Simón Bolívar or Simon Bolivar may also refer to:

== Arts and entertainment ==
- Bust of Simón Bolívar (Houston), U.S.
- Simón Bolívar (1942 film), a Mexican film
- Simón Bolívar (1969 film), a Spanish film
- Simón Bolívar (opera), by Thea Musgrave
- Simón Bolívar (Tadolini), three bronze statues in various locations
- Statue of Simón Bolívar, London, England
- Equestrian statue of Simón Bolívar (Central Park), New York, U.S.
- Equestrian statue of Simón Bolívar (Washington, D.C.), U.S.
- Cantata infantil Simón Bolívar, a work by Rubén Cedeño
- Orquesta Sinfónica Simón Bolívar, a Venezuelan orchestra

== Education ==
- Simón Bolívar University (Colombia)
- Simón Bolívar University (Mexico)
- Simón Bolívar University (Venezuela)
- Simón Bolívar United World College of Agriculture, in Venezuela
- Instituto Simón Bolívar, a school in Mexico City
- Colegio Simón Bolívar (Simon Bolivar University), a school in Mexico City

== Places ==
- Villa Simón Bolívar, Santa Cruz, Bolivia
- Simón Bolívar, Distrito Nacional, a sector in Santo Domingo, Dominican Republic
- Simón Bolívar Canton, Ecuador
  - Simón Bolívar, Ecuador, a town
- General Simón Bolívar Municipality, Durango, Mexico
  - General Simón Bolívar, a city
- Simón Bolívar District, Paraguay
- Simón Bolívar District, Peru
- Simón Bolívar Municipality, Anzoátegui, Venezuela
- Simón Bolívar Municipality, Miranda, Venezuela
- Simón Bolívar Municipality, Zulia, Venezuela
- Simon Bolivar, Tehran, Iran

== Sport ==
- Copa Simón Bolívar, a football league in Bolivia
- Copa Simón Bolívar (Venezuela), a football league

== Transport ==
=== Ships ===
- Simón Bolívar (barque), a Venezuelan Navy training ship
- SS Simon Bolivar, a Dutch passenger-cargo liner
- USS Simon Bolivar (SSBN-641), a US submarine

=== Rail and bus stations ===
- Simón Bolívar (TransMilenio), a bus station in Bogotá, Colombia
- Simón Bolívar metro station (Monterrey), Mexico
- Simón Bolívar metro station (Santiago), Chile
- Libertador Simón Bolívar Terminal, a railway station in Caracas, Venezuela

== Other uses ==
- International Simón Bolívar Prize, a UNESCO award
- Venesat-1 "Simón Bolívar", a Venezuelan satellite

== See also ==
- List of places and things named after Simón Bolivar
- Bolívar (disambiguation)
- Orindatus Simon Bolivar Wall (1825–1891), the first black man to be commissioned as captain in the Regular U.S. Army
- Simon Bolivar Buckner (1823–1914), American soldier and politician
- Simon Bolivar Buckner Jr. (1886–1945), American lieutenant general during World War II
