= List of places and things named after Simón Bolivar =

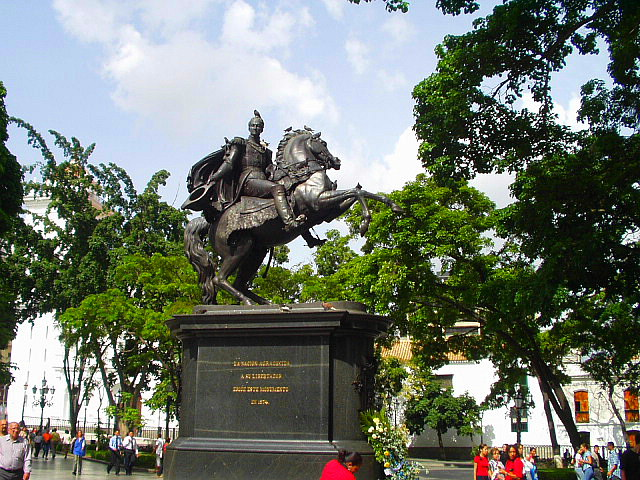
Plaza Bolívar, Caracas, Venezuela

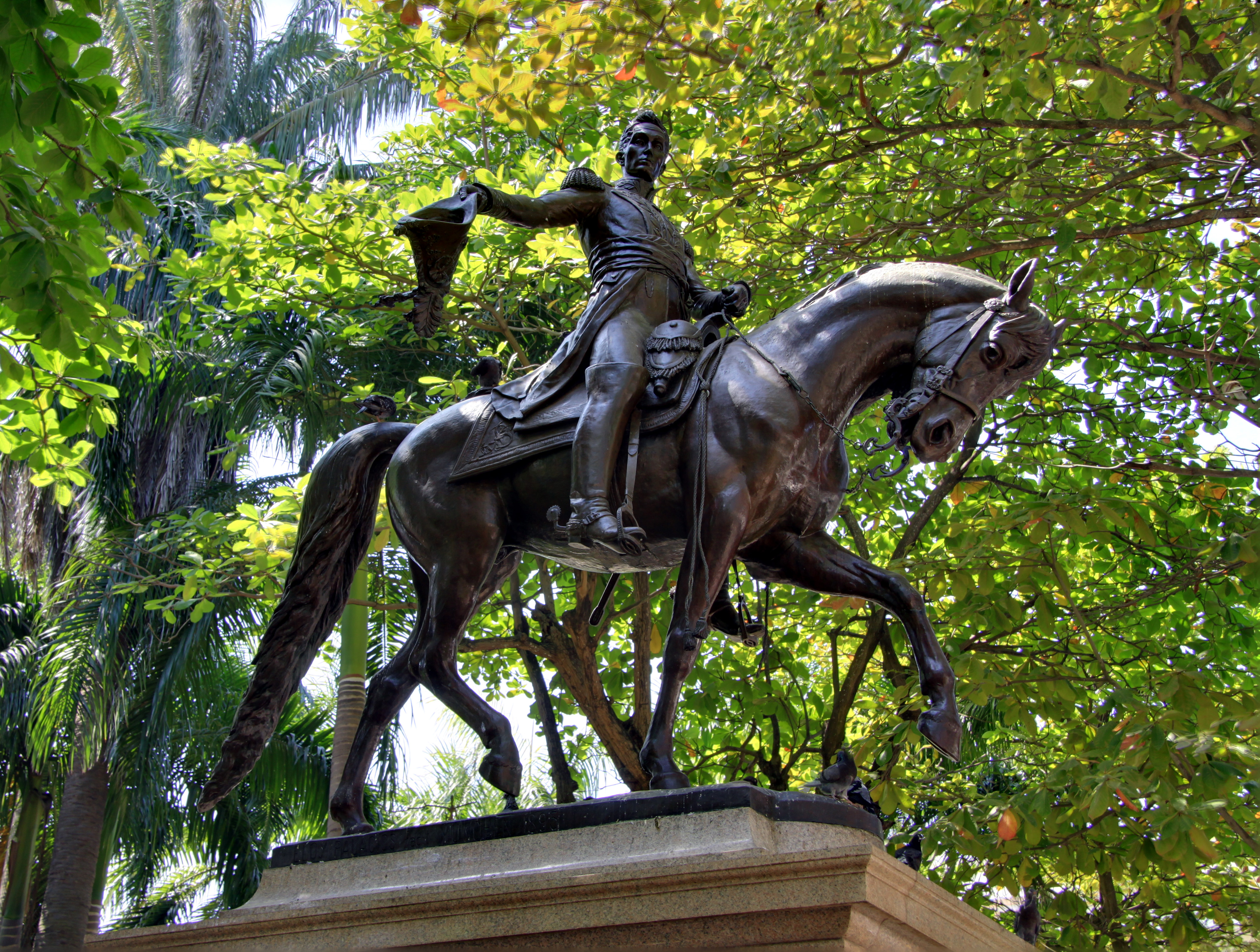
Simón Bolívar's equestrian statue in Cartagena, Colombia

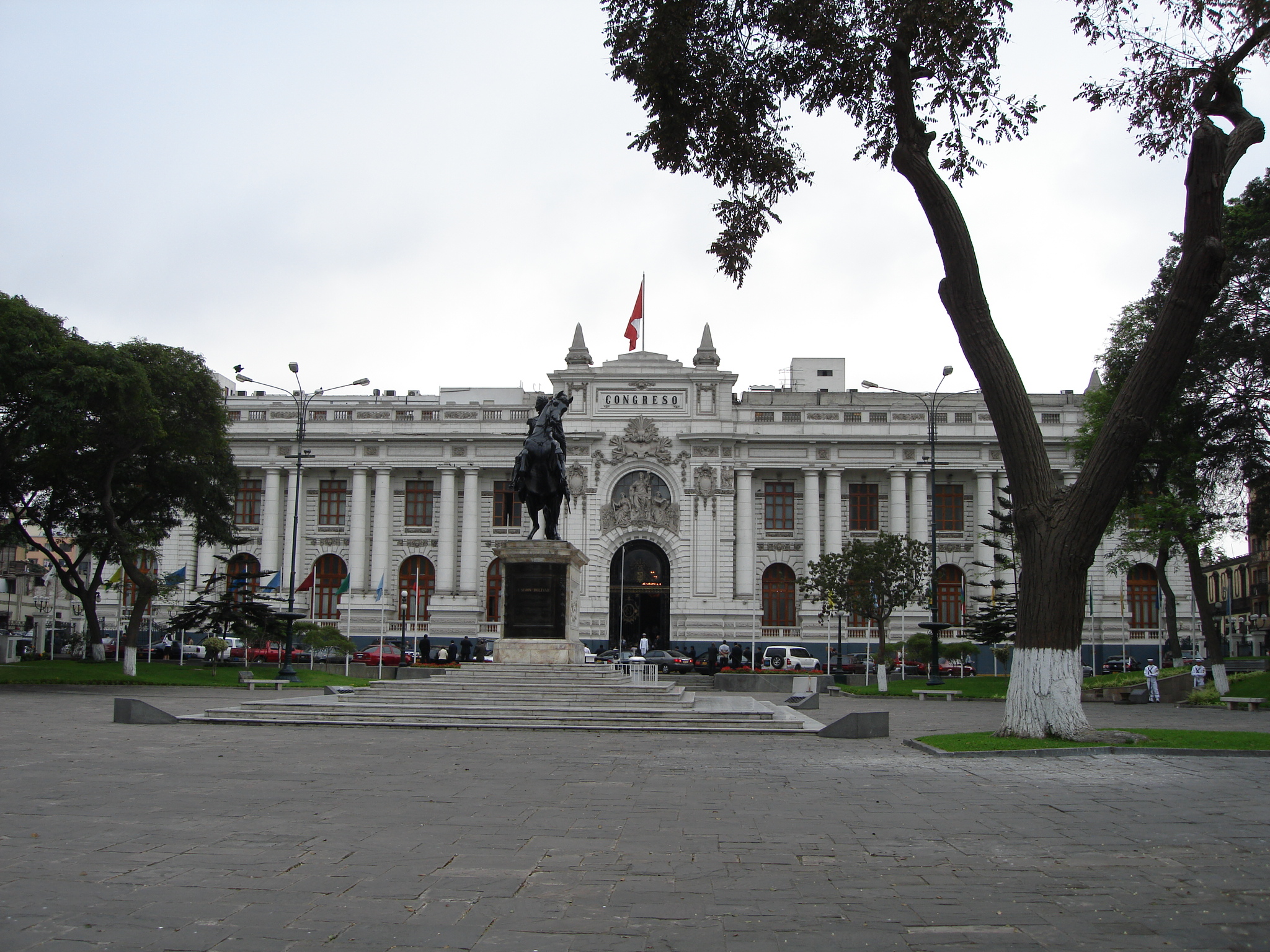
The Plaza Bolivar of Lima, Peru with the Legislative Palace in the foreground

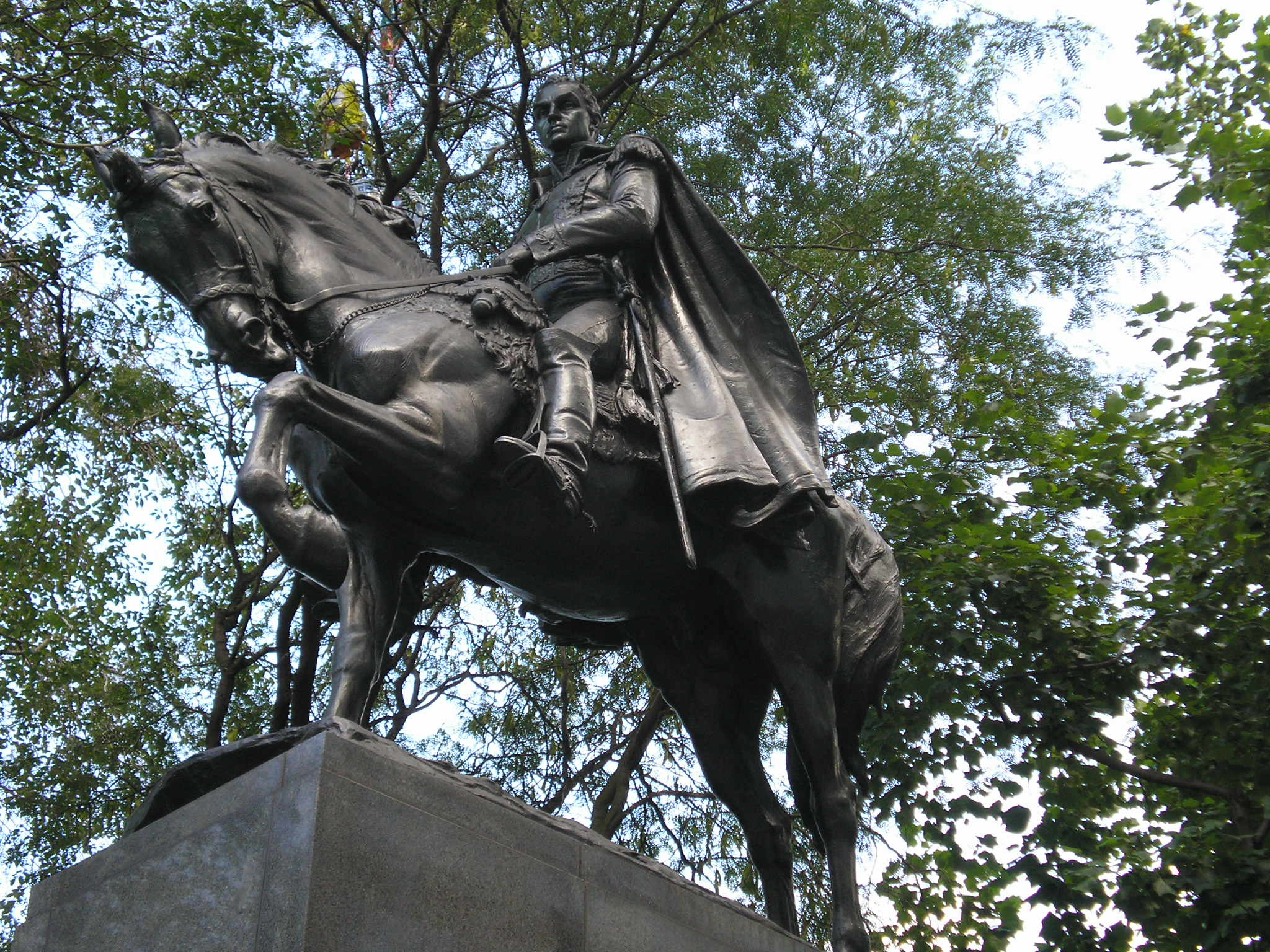
Simón Bolívar Monument, Sixth Avenue entrance to Central Park, New York City

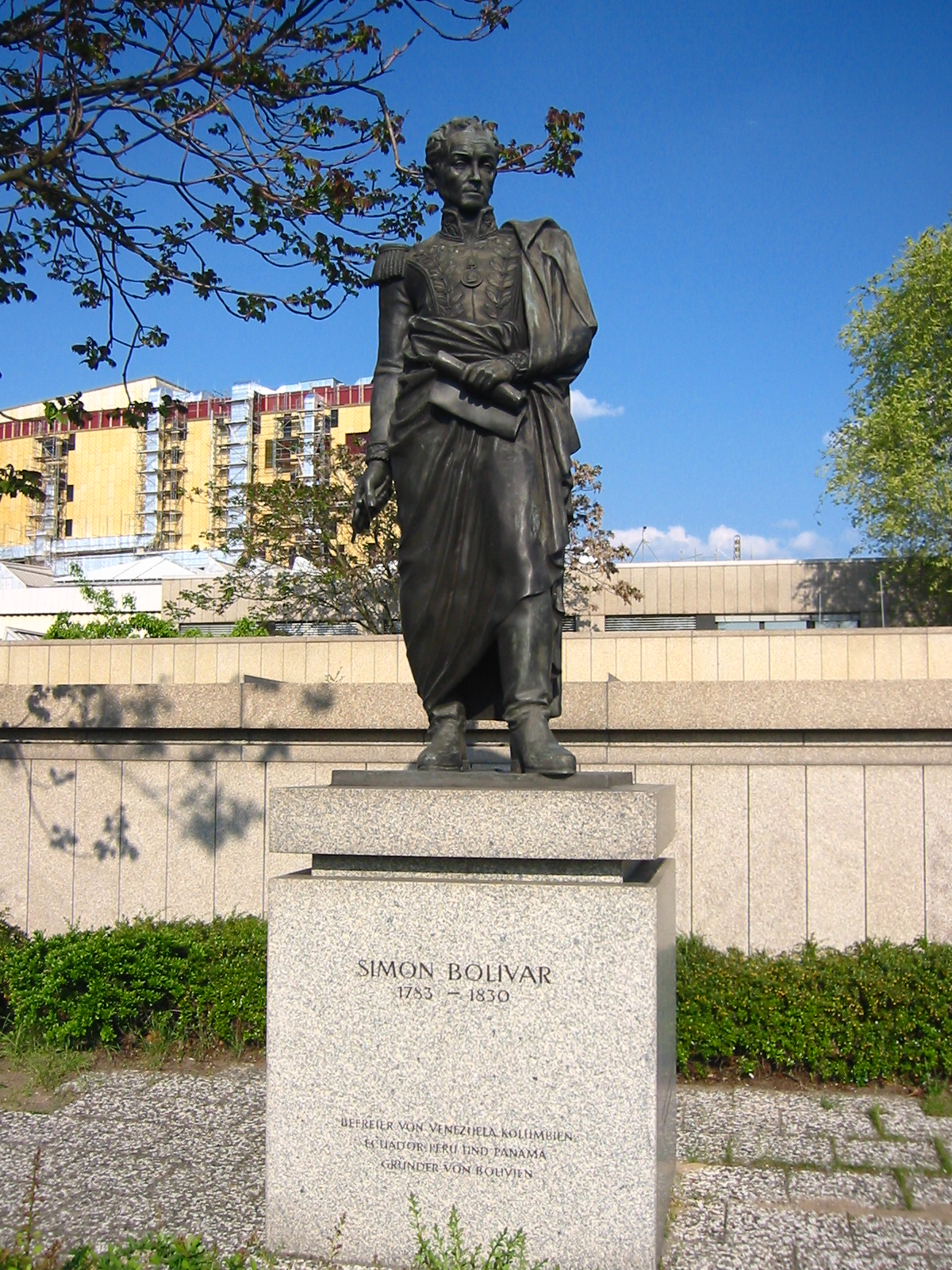
Statue of Simón Bolívar in Berlin, Germany

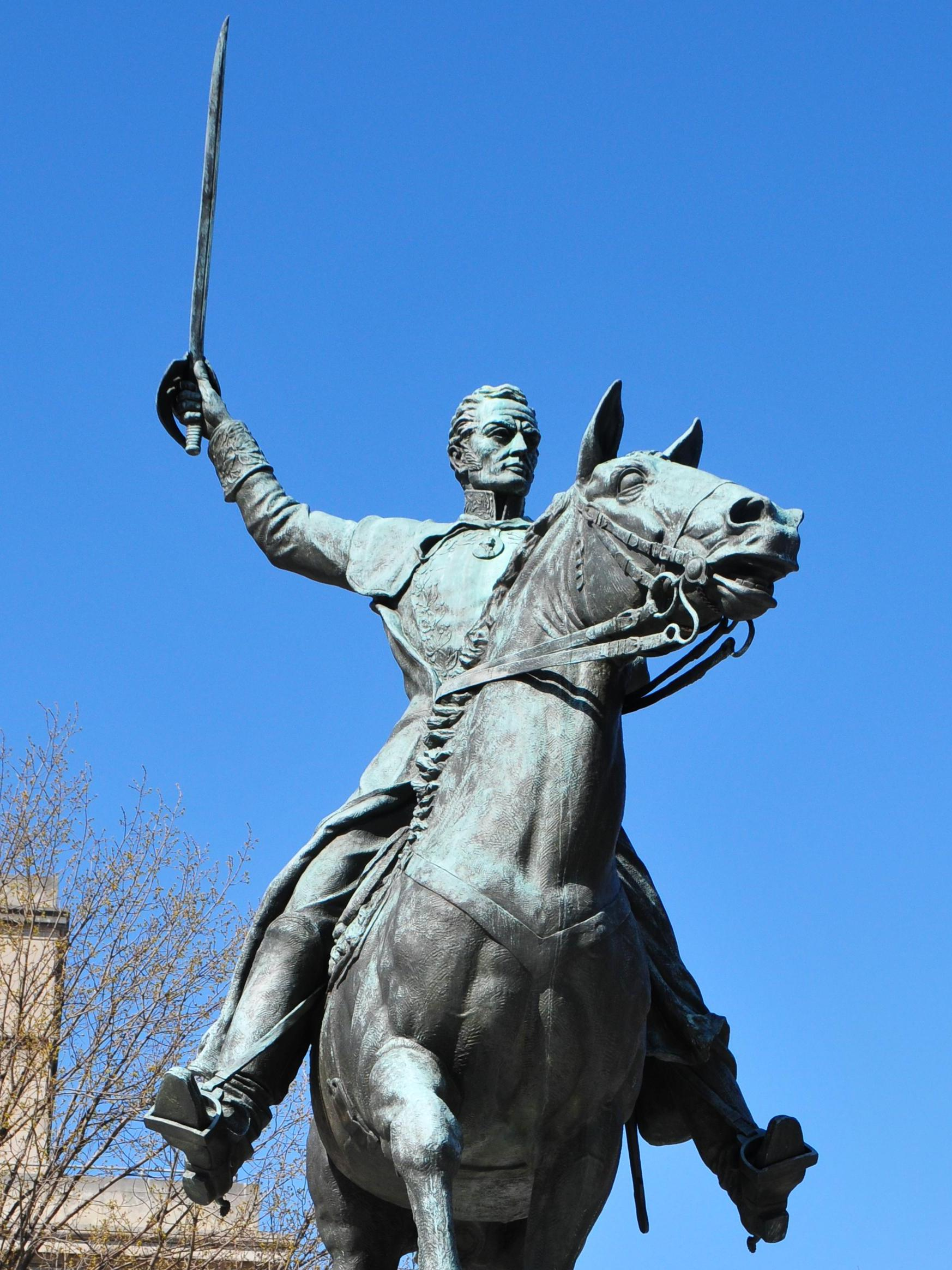
Statue of Simón Bolívar in Washington DC, United States

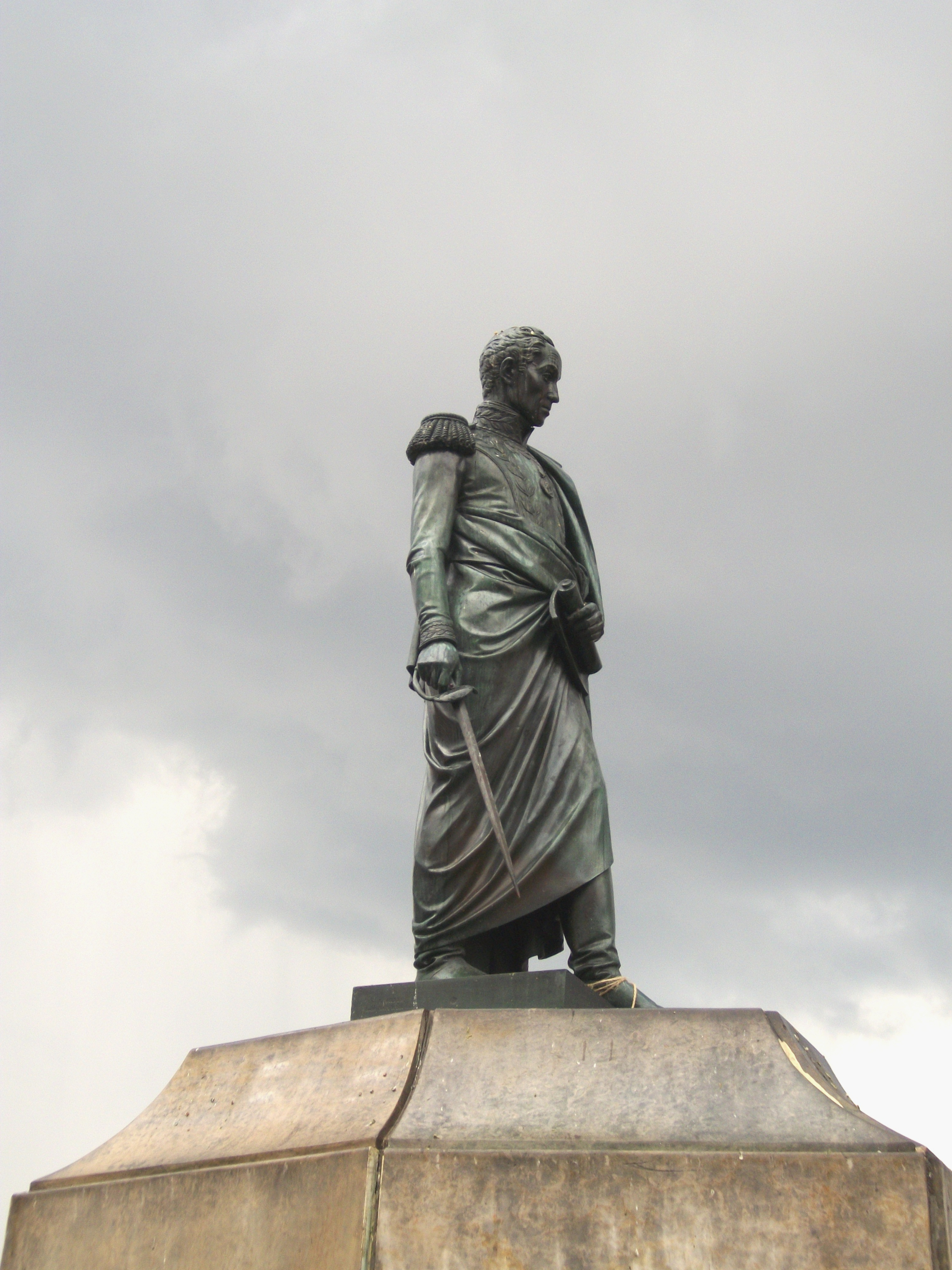
Plaza de Bolívar, Bogotá, Colombia

== Argentina ==
- San Carlos de Bolívar, Buenos Aires Province

== Australia ==
- A suburb of Adelaide, South Australia is named in his honour.
- Bolivar Esplanade in the new suburb of Truganina, in the western part of Naarm/Melbourne, Victoria is named after Simón Bolívar.

== Belgium ==
- Boulevard Simon Bolívar, a street in Brussels
- Bolivarplaats, a square in Antwerp
- Statue of Simon Bolívar "El Libertador" in front of the Brussels-North railway station in Brussels

== Bolivia ==
- Bolivia is named after Simón Bolívar
- Bolívar Province, Cochabamba
  - Bolívar, Cochabamba
- Villa Simón Bolívar, a small town
- Club Bolívar, a football team who plays at the Estadio Libertador Simón Bolívar
- Copa Simón Bolívar, a football competition

== Bulgaria ==
- Simón Bolívar secondary school in Plovdiv, opened on 1983 in honor of the 200th anniversary of his birth
- Statue of Simón Bolívar in Sofia opened in 2010 in honor of the 200th anniversary of the independence of the Bolivarian Republic of Venezuela

== Chile ==
- Simón Bolívar metro station (Santiago), Chile

== Colombia ==
- Bolívar Department
  - El Carmen de Bolívar
- Bolívar, Cauca
- Bolívar, Santander
- Bolívar, Valle del Cauca
- Ciudad Bolívar, Bogotá
- Ciudad Bolívar, Antioquia
- Bolívar Park (Medellín, Colombia)
- Carrera Bolívar, Medellín
- Simón Bolívar International Airport (Colombia), serving Santa Marta city
- Puerto Bolívar Airport, a private airport in La Guajira Department of Colombia
- Simón Bolívar Park, Bogotá
- Plaza Bolívar, Bogotá
- Pico Simón Bolívar, at the Sierra Nevada de Santa Marta
- Simón Bolívar (TransMilenio), a bus station in Bogotá, Colombia
- Bolívar (TV series), a 2019 historical drama television series

== Costa Rica ==
- Parque Zoológico Nacional Simón Bolívar, in San José, Costa Rica

== Cuba ==
- Bolívar (cigar brand)

== Ecuador ==
- Bolívar Province (Ecuador)
- Puerto Bolívar, a port
- José Joaquín de Olmedo International Airport, formerly Simón Bolívar International Airport, Guayaquil, Ecuador

== El Salvador ==
- Bolívar, a town La Unión province

== France ==
- Equestrian Statue of Simón Bolívar, just a few steps away from the Eiffel Tower and the Seine, in Paris. It was built by major French sculptor Emmanuel Frémiet, famous for his Jeanne d'Arc golden statue in Paris. Frémiet sculpted it for Bogota, Colombia in 1910 before the latter offered it in 1930 to Paris for the 100th anniversary of Bolívar's death.The statue was originally at the Place de la Porte-de-Champerret, but was moved to its present location (the Cours la Reine) in 1980.
- Bolivar station (Paris Metro), a station.
- Avenue Simon Bolivar, in Paris
- Rue Simon Bolivar, in Goussainville, near Paris and the Charles de Gaulle Airport.
- Allée Simon Bolivar, 26100, Romans-sur-Isère, Arrondissement de Valence
- Rue Simon Bolivar, 95190, Commune de Goussainville, Arrondissement de Sarcelles
- Impasse Simon Bolivar, 02220, Braine, Arrondissement of Soissons
- Avenue Simón Bolívar, 75019, Quartier du Combat, Paris 19th Arrondissement
- Boulevard Simon Bolivar, 13014, La Delorme, 15th Arrondissement, Marseille
- Rue Simon Bolivar, 13014, La Delorme, 15th Arrondissement, Marseille
- Rue Simon Bolivar, 13014, Saint-Joseph, 14th Arrondissement, Marseille
- Allée Simon Bolivar, 93140, Les Merisiers, Bondy
- Avenue Simón Bolívar, 75019, Belleville, Quartier de Belleville, Paris 20th Arrondissement
- Allée Simon Bolivar, 87280, Les Pilateries, Limoges
- Rue Simon Bolivar, 28500, La Croix Giboreau, Commune of Vernouillet
- Rue Simon Bolivar, 14th Arrondissement, Marseille

== Germany ==
- Simon Bolívar Anlage, a street in Frankfurt

== Hungary ==
- A park and a walkway in Budapest are named after him

== India ==
- Simon Bolivar Marg, a street in Chanakyapuri, New Delhi.
- Simon Bolivar Square, a road intersection in Chanakyapuri, New Delhi.

== Iran ==
- Simon Bolivar Boulevard, in Tehran

== Italy ==
- Piazza Simone Bolivar, in Milan
- Piazza Bolivar, in Noto
- Parco Simon Bolivar, in Roma Monte Sacro

== Jamaica ==
- Simón Bolívar Cultural Centre, Kingston, Jamaica
- Simon Bolivar - Cluster 2, Rex Nettleford Hall of Residence, The University of the West Indies Mona

== Mexico ==
- General Simón Bolívar Municipality and its municipal seat, General Simón Bolívar
- Instituto Simón Bolívar, a private school in Xoco, Benito Juárez, Mexico City
- Colegio Simón Bolívar (Simon Bolivar University), a school in Colonia Insurgentes, Mixcoac, Benito Juárez, Mexico City
- Colegio La Salle Simón Bolívar, a private school system in Mexico City
- Simón Bolívar (1942 film), a Mexican film
- Simón Bolívar metro station (Monterrey), on Simón Bolivar Avenue

== Paraguay ==
- Simón Bolívar District, Paraguay

== Peru ==
- Bolívar District, Bolívar
- Bolívar, Peru, the capital of Bolívar District
- Bolívar Province, Peru, in La Libertad Region
- Simón Bolívar (Tadolini), three statues, one of which is in Lima

== Spain ==
- Avenida Simón Bolívar, a street in Málaga
- Simón Bolívar (1969 film), a Spanish film

== Switzerland ==
- Statue of Simón Bolívar in Bern along the Universal Postal Union

== Turkey ==
- Simon Bolivar Bulvarı, a street in Ankara

== United Kingdom ==
- Statue of Simón Bolívar, London
- Simón Bolívar Professor of Latin-American Studies at Cambridge University
- Bolivar Terrace in Glasgow, Scotland is named after Simon Bolivar and there is a commemorative plaque on the wall of one of the buildings.

== United States ==
- Bolivar, Alabama
- Simón Bolívar (Tadolini), three statues, one of which is in United Nations Plaza in San Francisco, California
- Bolivar, Georgia
- Bolivar Township, Benton County, Indiana
- New Orleans, Simon Bolivar Blvd, Statue
- Bolivar County, Mississippi
- Bolivar, Missouri with their high school namesake The Liberator
- Bolivar, New York
  - Bolivar (village), New York
- Bolivar, Ohio
- Bolivar Road in Cleveland, Ohio. Coincidentally this street is adjacent to the Cleveland Guardians ballpark, (formerly the Cleveland Indians), franchise where many great Venezuelan shortstops have played.
- Mount Bolivar, Oregon, a high point in Oregon
- Bolivar, Pennsylvania
- Bolivar, Tennessee
- Bolivar, Texas
- Bust of Simón Bolívar (Houston), Texas
- Bolivar Peninsula, Texas
- Equestrian statue of Simón Bolívar (Washington, D.C.)
- Bolivar, West Virginia
- USS Simon Bolivar (SSBN-641), a nuclear submarine
- Bolivar House, Center of Latin American Studies, Stanford University
- Simon Bolivar st. In New Orleans, Louisiana.

== Uruguay ==
- Bolívar, Montevideo
- Bolívar, Uruguay

== Venezuela ==
- The Bolivarian Republic of Venezuela, the official long name of Venezuela
- Bolívar (state)
  - Ciudad Bolívar, capital of Bolívar State
- several municipalities: see Simón Bolívar Municipality (disambiguation) or Bolívar Municipality (disambiguation)
- many towns and cities in Venezuela have a Plaza Bolivar: see Plaza Bolivar (disambiguation)
- Simón Bolívar International Bridge on the Venezuela–Colombia border
- Simón Bolívar (Tadolini), three statues, one of which is in Caracas
- Guri Dam, or the Simón Bolívar Hydroelectric Plant, in Bolívar State, Venezuela, on the Caroni River
- Teatro Simón Bolívar, a theatre in Caracas
- Venezuelan bolívar, the currency of Venezuela
- Pico Bolívar, highest peak in Venezuela
- Simón Bolívar International Airport (Venezuela), serving the capital city of Venezuela, Caracas
- Simón Bolívar University in Caracas, Venezuela
- Centro Simón Bolívar Towers, two 26-story twin towers located in Caracas, Venezuela
- Simón Bolívar United World College of Agriculture
- Venesat-1 "Simón Bolívar", a satellite launched in 2008
- Orquesta Sinfónica Simón Bolívar, an orchestra
- Simón Bolívar (barque) of the Venezuelan Navy
- Copa Simón Bolívar (Venezuela), a football competition
- Estadio de Fútbol de la Universidad Simón Bolívar in Caracas

== Other uses ==
- Streets in numerous cities, including Ankara, Cairo, Guatemala City, Managua, Mexico City, Milwaukee, New Delhi, New Orleans, Paris, Santiago and Tehran, are named after Simón Bolívar.
- International Simón Bolívar Prize

== "El Libertador" ==
- Bolivar is often referred to as "El Libertador" (The liberator), and a number of places bear this title in his honour. In the southern part of South America "El Libertador" may refer to José de San Martín.
- A number of Venezuelan municipalities are named Libertador Municipality: see Libertador Municipality (disambiguation)
- Puerto Libertador, Colombia
- Order of the Liberator, formerly the highest distinction of Venezuela

== People with the name ==
- Orindatus Simon Bolivar Wall (1825–1891), the first black man to be commissioned as captain in the Regular U.S. Army
- Simon Bolivar Buckner (1823–1914), American soldier and politician
- Simon Bolivar Buckner Jr. (1886–1945), American lieutenant general during World War II
