= Tadolini =

Tadolini is a surname of Italian origin. Notable people with this surname include:

- Adamo Tadolini (1788–1863), Italian neo-classical sculptor
- Eugenia Tadolini (née Savorani; 1809–1872), Italian operatic soprano
- Francesco Tadolini (1723–1805), Italian architect of the neoclassic period
- Giovanni Tadolini (1789–1872), Italian composer, conductor and singing instructor
- Giulio Tadolini (1849–1918), Academic-trained Italian sculptor
- Scipione Tadolini (1822–1893), Italian sculptor
