= Teatro Simón Bolívar =

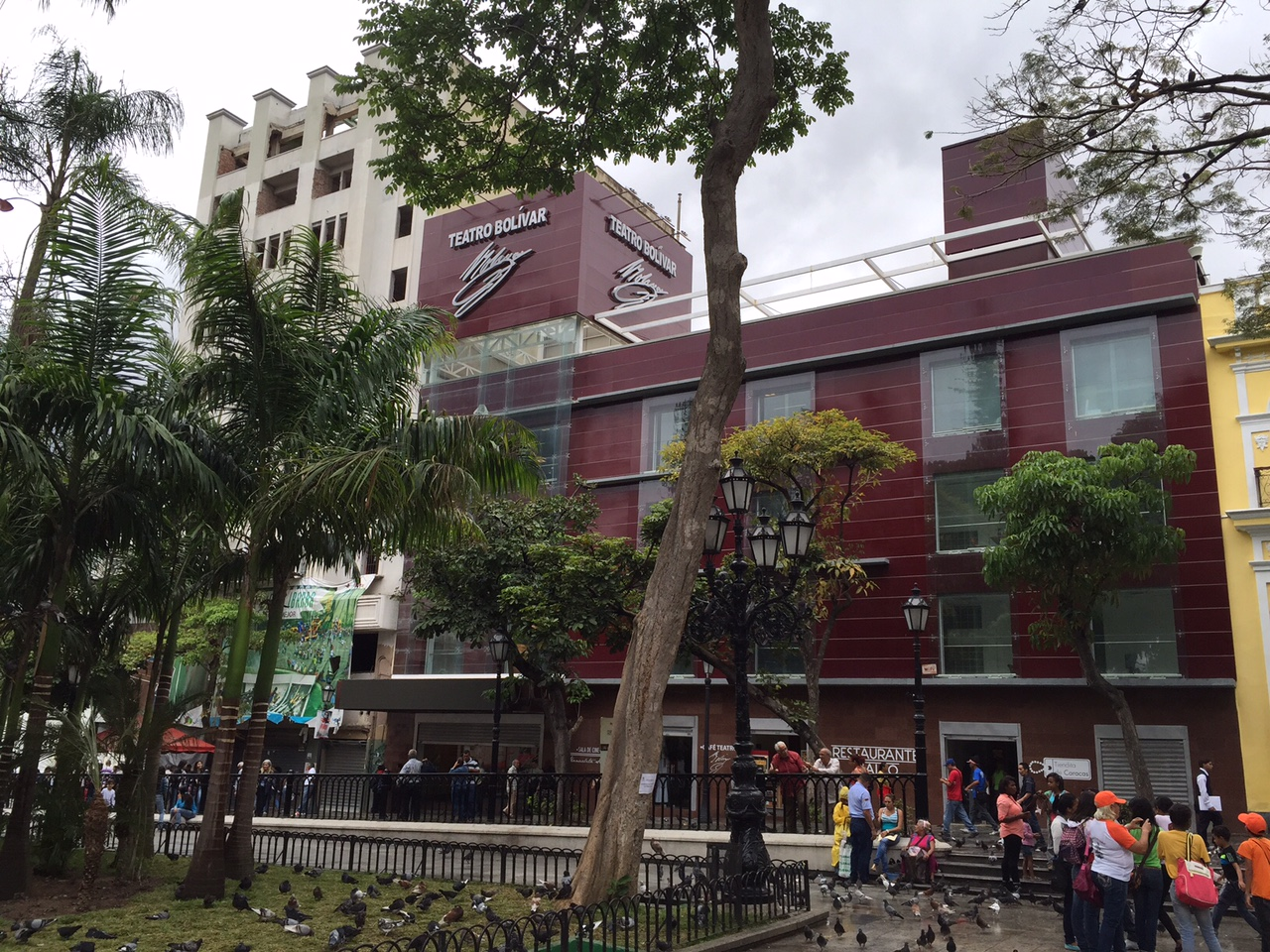
- Interactive map of Teatro Simón Bolívar
- Address: Caracas, Venezuela
- Capacity: 679

Construction
- Opened: 1917
- Reopened: 18 December 2013

The Teatro Simón Bolívar (English: Simón Bolívar Theatre) is a cultural and theatre complex located in the Libertador Municipality of Caracas. It is in the Rialto building near the Yellow House, the La Francia building, and Plaza Bolívar.

== History ==
The space began its history as the Princess Cinema in 1917, and was then known as the Rialto Cinema from 1919. It was closed in 1941 and reopened in 1943. For many years after the reopening it was affected by deterioration, so in the 21st century it was rebuilt, and expanded, becoming the Simón Bolívar Theatre. It was reopened again on 18 December 2013 by the authorities of the Capital District and the mayor's office of the Libertador Municipality of Caracas.

== Facilities ==
It has 679 seats adorned with allegorical symbols to the Liberator Simón Bolívar. These include 504 seats in the balcony and a multipurpose room with capacity for 175 people. The space also has areas enabled for exhibitions.

== See also ==
- Teatro Municipal de Caracas
- National Theatre of Venezuela
- Teresa Carreño Cultural Complex
