= Yellow House (Venezuela) =

National historical monument of Venezuela in Caracas

Casa Amarilla
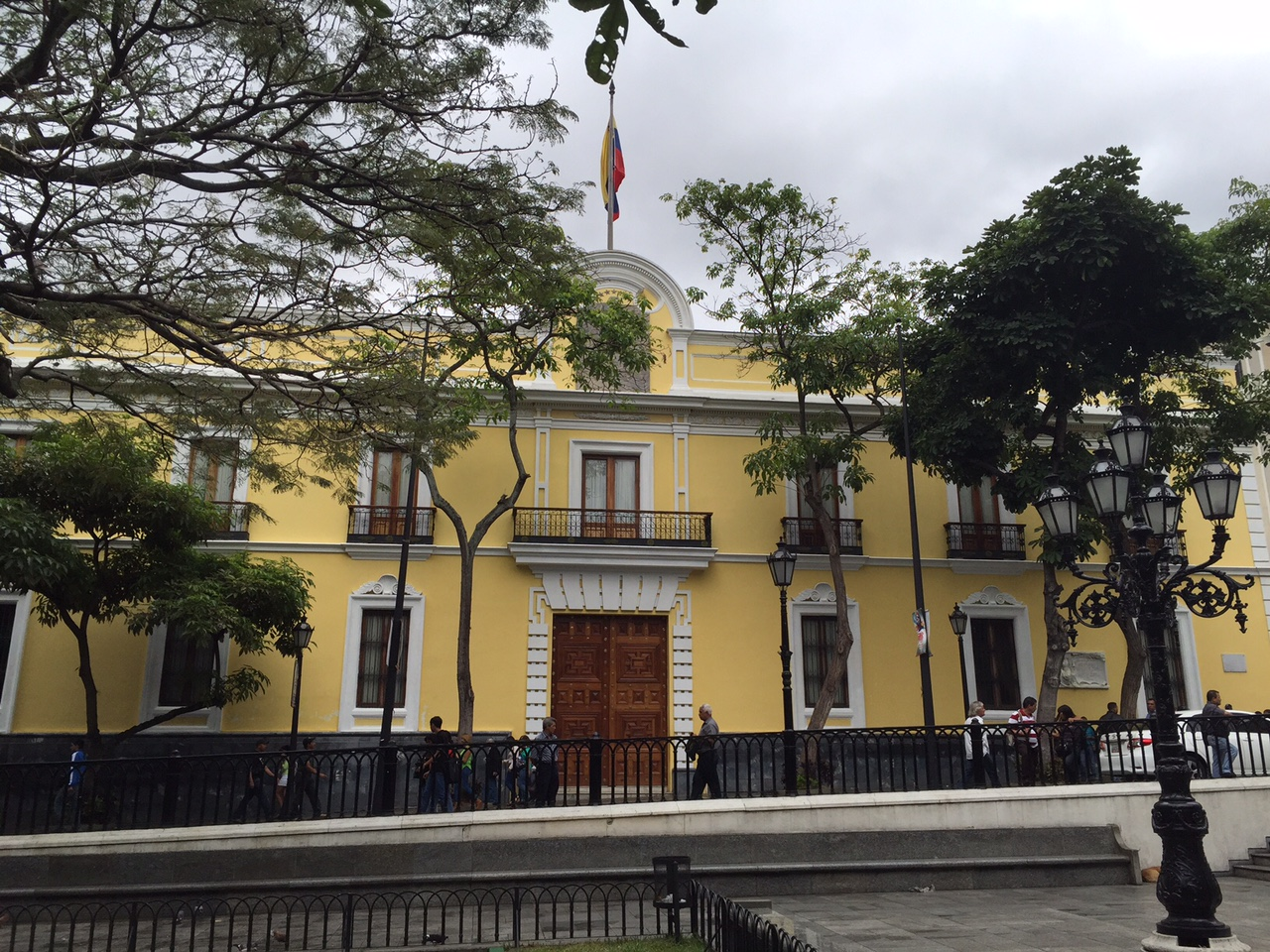
- Interactive map of the Casa Amarilla area

General information
- Location: Plaza Bolívar, Caracas
- Coordinates: 10°30′23.65″N 66°54′54.43″W

Design and construction
- Architect: Juan Hurtado Manrique

The Casa Amarilla de Caracas (English: Yellow House) is a 19th Century neoclassical building in Plaza Bolívar, Caracas and in front of the Santa Ana Cathedral, in the city's main historic quarter.

Originally, it served as the headquarters of the Royal Jail of Caracas and the City Council but, after being reformed, it was used from 1877 to 1904 as the government palace and official residence of presidents including Francisco Linares Alcántara and Cipriano Castro. Since 1912, it has been the headquarters of the Ministry of Foreign Affairs. On 16 February 1979, the Yellow House was designated a National Historical Monument.

== History ==
In the first known plans of Caracas, drawn up by the Governor Juan de Pimentel in around 1578, the original site was a quarter of a block and was occupied by a house. This house was probably only a modest construction of bahareque and horcones. In 1689, part of that lot was acquired by the Caracas city council for the heirs of Antonio de Tovar to build the new city prison, opened in 1696. The south side of the plot became the property of the council in 1704, after a land swap with Isabel María Xedler. On this site the new headquarters of the City council, finished in December 1750, was built.

The House of the Cabildo was the location of the protests of 19 April 1810, when canon José Cortés de Madariaga stood on its balconies and signalled the people of Caracas to disavow Captain General Vicente Emparan, in what is known as the first step to Venezuelan Independence. This event was recorded in contemporary writings, with the original kept and exhibited in the Santa Rosa Chapel of Lima of the Municipal Palace.

The earthquake of 26 March 1812 affected the building, which remained in ruins for decades and affecting the seat of the City Council, with the reconstruction taking four years. In 1841, Congress approved the sale of both buildings from the Municipality to the National Government, allocating them as the seat of the government. After its renovation, the building was inaugurated in 1842 under the presidency of the General José Antonio Páez.

In 1874, by order of president Antonio Guzmán Blanco, the building received the image that it now holds, when it was converted into the Government Palace. The remodelling works were directed by the architect Juan Hurtado Manrique, who built the 1810 City Hall memorial pavilion on the south side. The Government Palace was inaugurated on November 7 of that year, along with the statue of Simón Bolívar in the Plaza that has since been named after him.

By the Law of 4 May 1877, the National Congress allocates the Government Palace to "Mansion of the President of the Republic". General Francisco Linares Alcántara became the first to live there. Painted yellow, the color that represented the Liberal Party, it began to be called "Yellow House" in official documents.

During the 1900 San Narciso earthquake of 28 October, the second president to inhabit the House, Cipriano Castro, jumped into the street with an umbrella from one of his balconies and suffered a broken ankle, which lead him to consider changing from an official residence to a building with anti-seismic structure. In 1904 the Presidential House was transferred to Miraflores Palace, and the Yellow House became occupied by the High Court of Cassation and the Government of Caracas. Finally, by decree issued on 28 October 1912 by President Juan Vicente Gómez, the building was converted into the headquarters of the Ministry of Foreign Affairs. In 1989 the second floor of the House caught fire, destroying part of the building's artistic heritage.

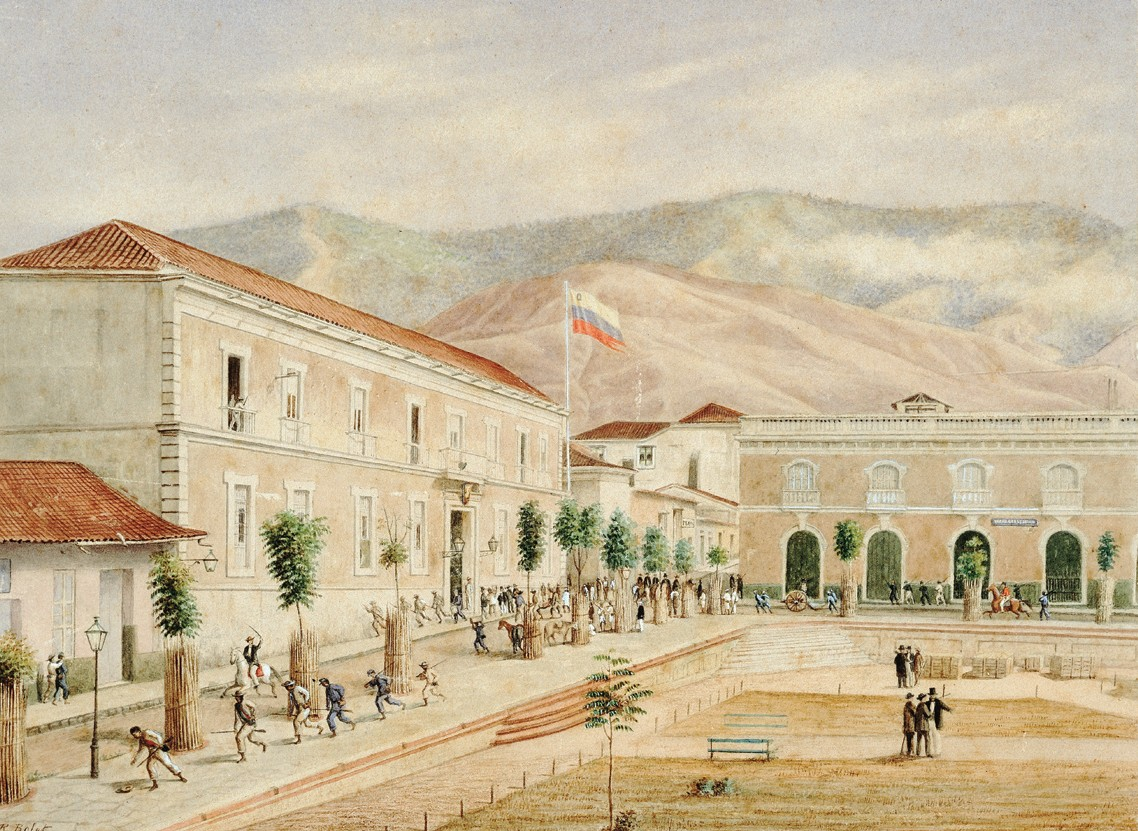
Caracas, Casa de Gobierno, Plaza Bolívar (Ramón Bolet Peraza, 1870)

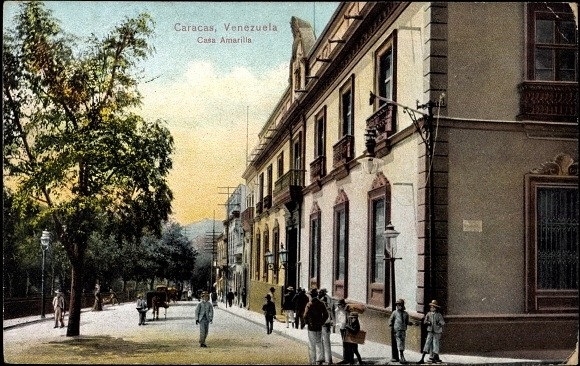
Postcard from 1904, with a side view of the Yellow House

== Architecture ==
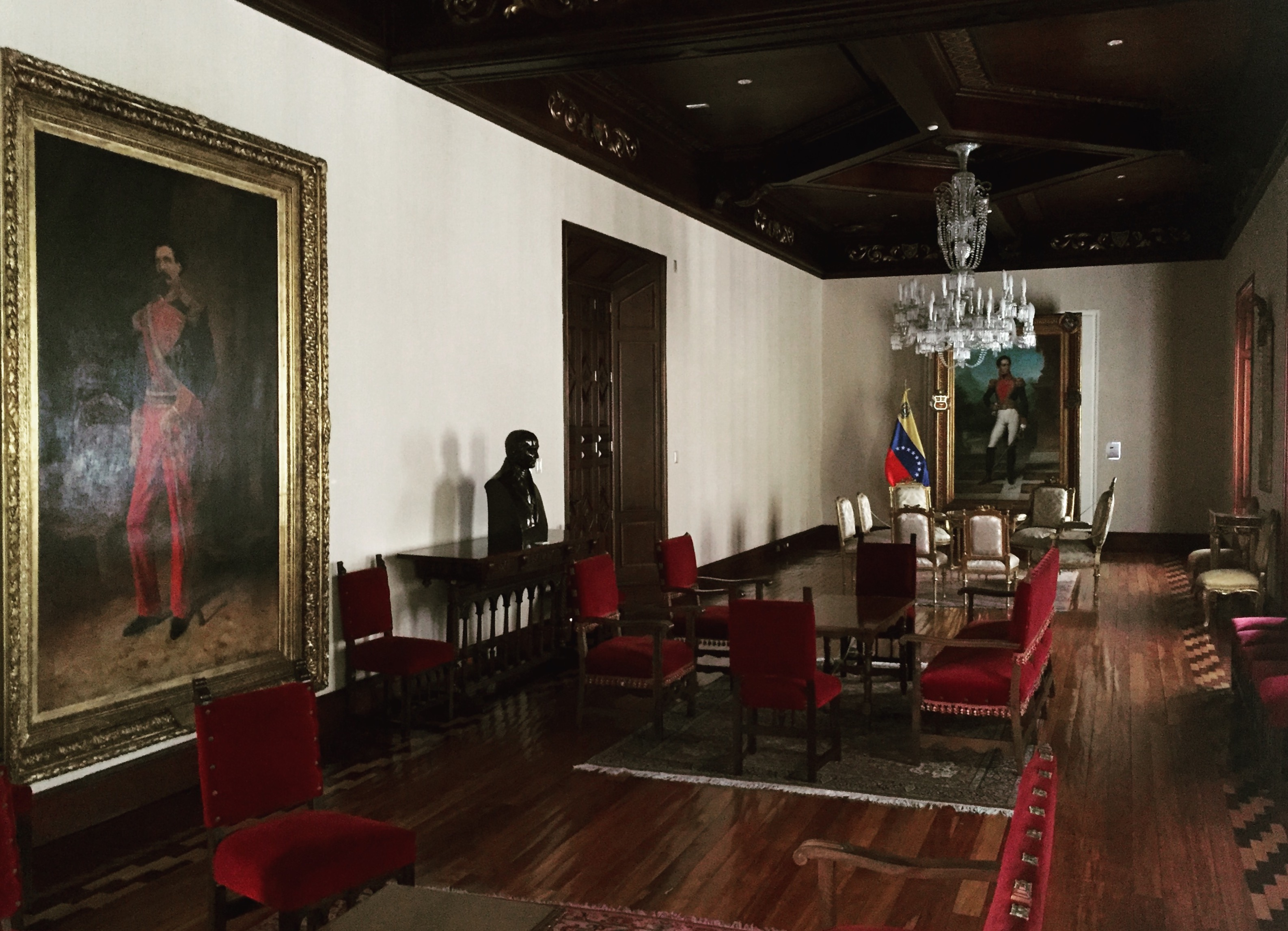
The Bolívar Room of the Yellow House

The Yellow House has a regular floor plan, with a square shape and two floors, organized around a central courtyard; this courtyard is surrounded on both floors by a terrace and balcony corridor, defined by Ionic columns that support a series of arcades. It has several protocol halls, among which stands out the Bolívar Room, which occupies the entire front of the second floor.
