= Amanda Ann Thomas Wall =

American educator and suffragist

- Born: c. 1837; Loudoun County, Virginia
- Died: November 1902; Washington, DC
- Occupations: Educator and suffragist
- Spouse: Orindatus Simon Bolivar Wall
- Children: Edward C., Stephen Roscoe, Sallie, Laura Gertrude, and Isabel Irene

Amanda Ann Thomas Wall (c. 1837 - 1902) was an educator and suffragist who worked for African-American women's rights in the Reconstruction period. She and her husband, Orindatus Simon Bolivar Wall, were part of the African-American elite in Washington D.C. while he was the first African-American justice of the peace and police magistrate.

== Biography ==
Wall was born in Loudoun County, Virginia in about 1837 to her mother Charlotte. They lived in Cincinnati for a time, and in 1854 they moved to Oberlin, Ohio, where Wall attended Oberlin College. She was described as "quite light" in skin tone.

She befriended classmate Charlotte Wall at Oberlin. Charlotte's brother, Orindatus Simon Bolivar Wall (OSB), also attended Oberlin. The couple met in 1854 and they married the day after Charlotte married John Mercer Langston. The Walls had seven children, five of whom lived to adulthood. The two youngest daughters attended Oberlin College like their parents. Their children were "light enough to burn in the sun."

Oberlin was known for being an abolitionist town, and the Walls grew in status while living there. OSB owned land and hired other people to work the farms. Black residents still lived in fear of the Fugitive Slave Act of 1850. OSB played a part in the Oberlin-Wellington Rescue of 1858 and supported the Underground Railroad.

After the Civil war, OSB was stationed in Charleston, South Carolina. Wall joined him working at the Freedmen's Bureau, where she received an appointment from the American Missionary Association to teach at the Avery Institute. She was one of the first Black women to teach there, and was paid significantly less than other Northern teachers. In Charleston, she likely met Frances Rollin (later Whipple) as they worked in similar circles.

By 1867, Wall and her family moved to Washington D.C., where she resumed teaching freed people and was an agent for Frederick Douglass' New National Era.

As OSB received his law degree and was appointed the first Black Justice of the Peace, Wall and their family became leading "aristocrats of color." They built a house on Howard Hill where they hosted dinner parties for luminaries such as George Washington Williams, Susan B. Anthony, and Mr. and Mrs. Frederick Douglass.

In 1869, Wall joined the women's suffrage movement and attempted to register to vote. She marched in demonstrations from at least 1871 to 1874, including some that featured Frederick Douglass. In 1874, she joined Susan B. Anthony and other women who "placed on record" their support for woman suffrage.

OSB was nearly killed in an assault in 1871, and the family maintained their high status in social and civic life. They featured prominently in Empanciation Day ceremonies, and joined charitable efforts with other notable women of color. In later years, OSB faced charges of corruption and their star dimmed. At the end of their lives, the Walls struggled financially.

OSB died in 1891 following a stroke. Wall died in DC in November 1902. The couple are buried together at Arlington Cemetery.

After Wall's death, the couple's children crossed the color line to live as white.

== See also ==
- African-American women's suffrage movement
- Black suffrage in the United States
