= Plaza Bolivar =

Plaza Bolivar may refer to:

== Venezuela ==
- Plaza Bolívar (Caracas)
- Plaza Bolívar (Valencia)

== Elsewhere ==
- Plaza Bolívar, Bogotá, Colombia
- Plaza Bolívar, Lima, Peru
