= Bust of Simón Bolívar (Houston) =

Sculpture in Houston, Texas, U.S.

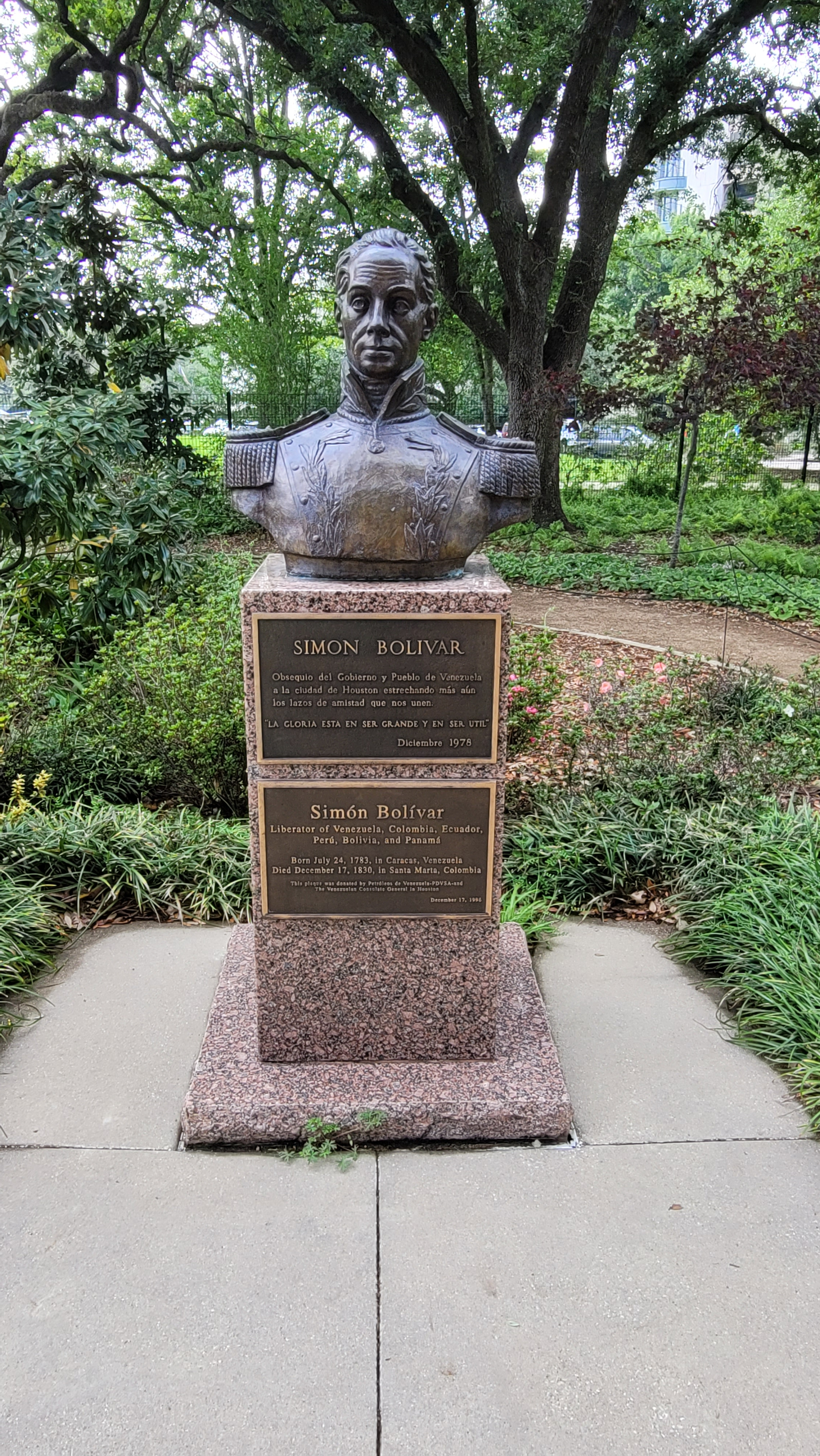
- Artist: C. Talacca
- Year: 1977
- Type: Sculpture
- Medium: Bronze
- Subject: Simón Bolívar
- Location: Houston, Texas, United States; 29°43′19″N 95°23′17.5″W

An outdoor 1977 bronze sculpture of the Simón Bolívar by C. Talacca is installed in Hermann Park's McGovern Centennial Gardens in Houston, Texas, United States. The bust was dedicated in 1978.

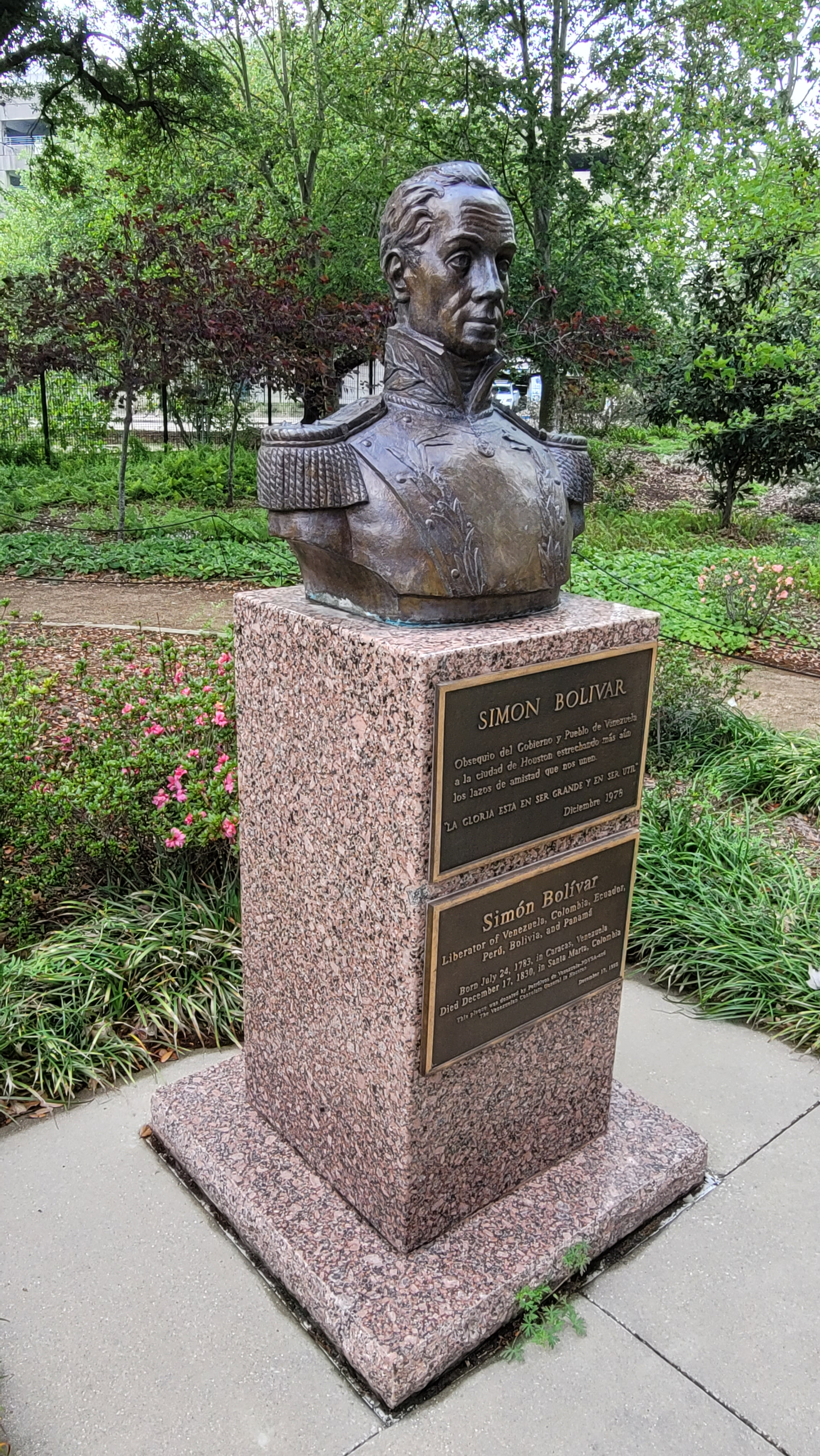

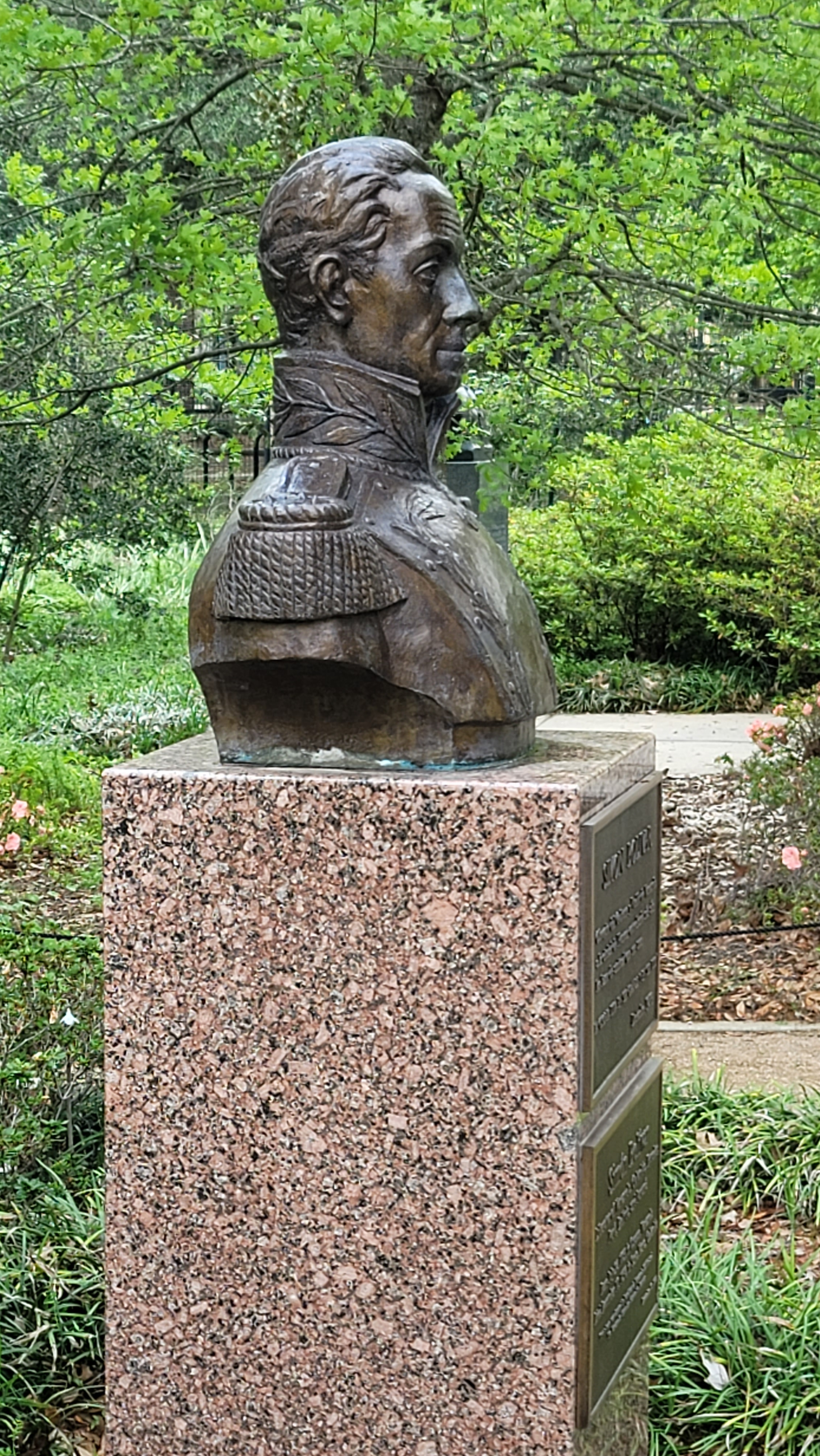

== See also ==
- 1977 in art
- List of places and things named after Simón Bolivar
- List of public art in Houston
