= Equestrian statue of Simón Bolívar (Washington, D.C.) =

Simón Bolívar
- Artist: Felix de Weldon
- Year: 1959
- Type: Bronze
- Dimensions: 820 cm × 240 cm × 530 cm (324 in × 96 in × 208 in)
- Location: Washington, D.C.; 38°53′35.2″N 77°2′31.2″W
- Owner: National Park Service

An equestrian statue of Venezuelan military and political leader Simón Bolívar by the American artist Felix de Weldon is located in Washington, D.C., at Virginia Avenue NW, 18th Street NW, and C Street NW, near the United States Department of Interior and the Pan American Union Building of the Organization of American States. It was surveyed as part of the Smithsonian Institution's Save Outdoor Sculpture! survey in 1993.

== Description ==
The statue shows Bolívar riding his horse with his proper right arm raised over his head. In that hand he wields his sword, holding it upwards. He wears a military uniform with great detail, including the gold medal that was once George Washington's. The sculpture sits on a base made of granite or marble (142 in. x 72 in. x 184 in., 8 tons).

The sculpture is signed: Felix W. de Weldon / Arch. Faulkner, Kingsbury & Stenhouse

The front of the base is inscribed with:

SIMON BOLIVAR
THE LIBERATOR
BORN JULY 24 1783
CARACAS VENEZUELA
DIED DECEMBER 17 1830
SANTA MARTA COLOMBIA

The east side of the base is inscribed with:

THE REPUBLIC OF VENEZUELA BY THE UNITED STATES OF AMERICA

The west side of the base is inscribed with:

LIBERATED VENEZUELA COLOMBIA ECUADOR PERU BOLIVIA AND PANAMA

== Information ==
The statue was authorized by the United States Congress on July 5, 1949, and permission for the piece to be installed on public property was granted on June 29, 1955. The sculpture was donated by the Venezuelan government, which also paid for its installation.

The sculpture was cast in New York and parts were broken down in order to be transported via highway to Washington. The head, neck and rider were disconnected to make it under the overpasses along the highways.

== Condition ==
This sculpture was surveyed in June 1993 for its condition and it was stated that the sculpture was "well maintained."

== See also ==
- Other equestrian statues of Bolivar
  - Simon Bolivar (Tadolini)
  - Merida, Venezuela
- Statue of Simón Bolívar, London
- List of public art in Washington, D.C., Ward 2
- Statues of the Liberators
