= Adamo Tadolini =

Italian sculptor (1788–1863)

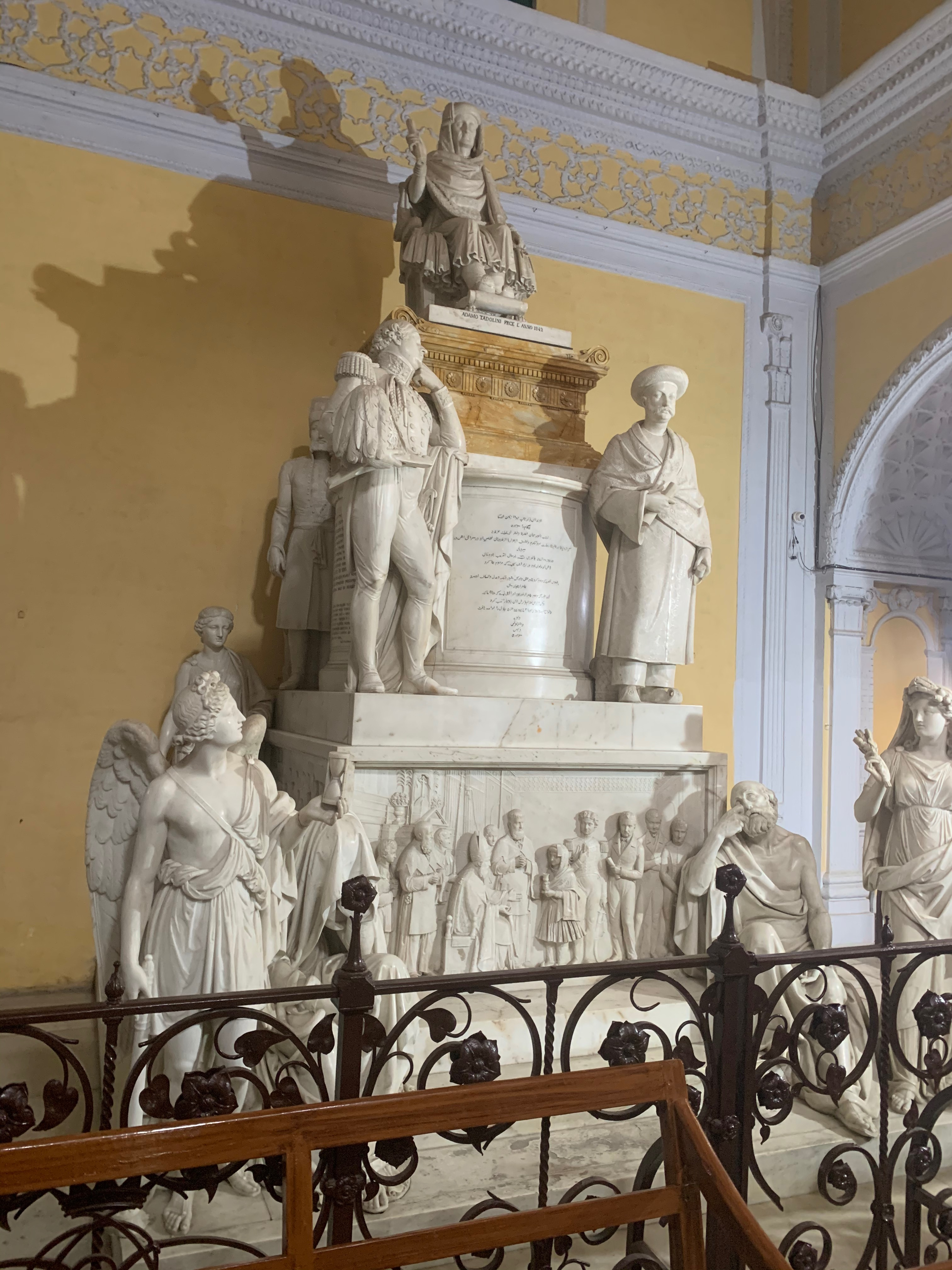

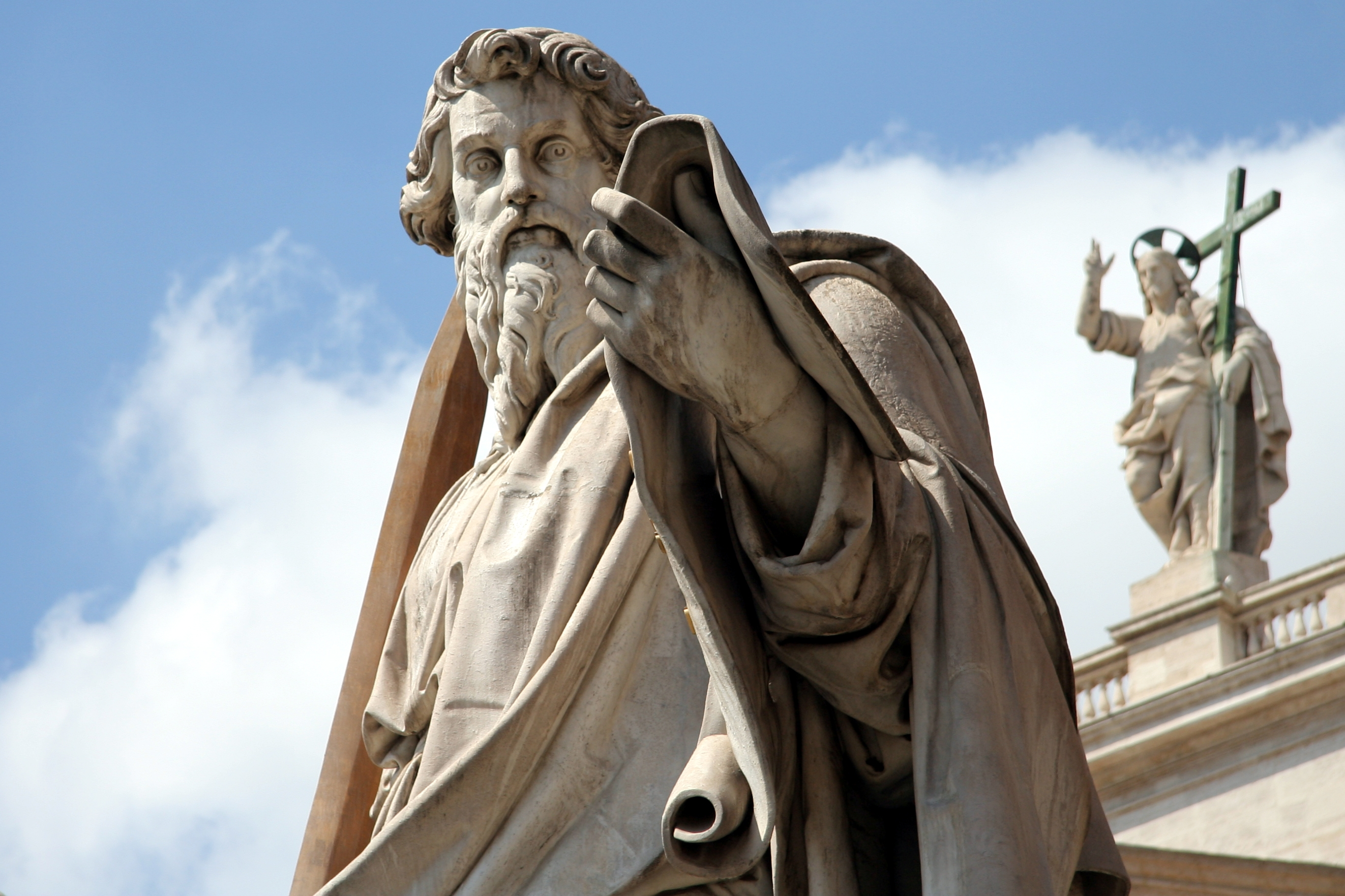
Statue of St. Paul in St. Peter's Square, Vatican City

Adamo Tadolini (21 December 1788 – 16 February 1863) was an Italian sculptor. One of a family of sculptors, he studied in Rome with the neo-classical sculptor Antonio Canova and is linked to him in style.

== Life ==
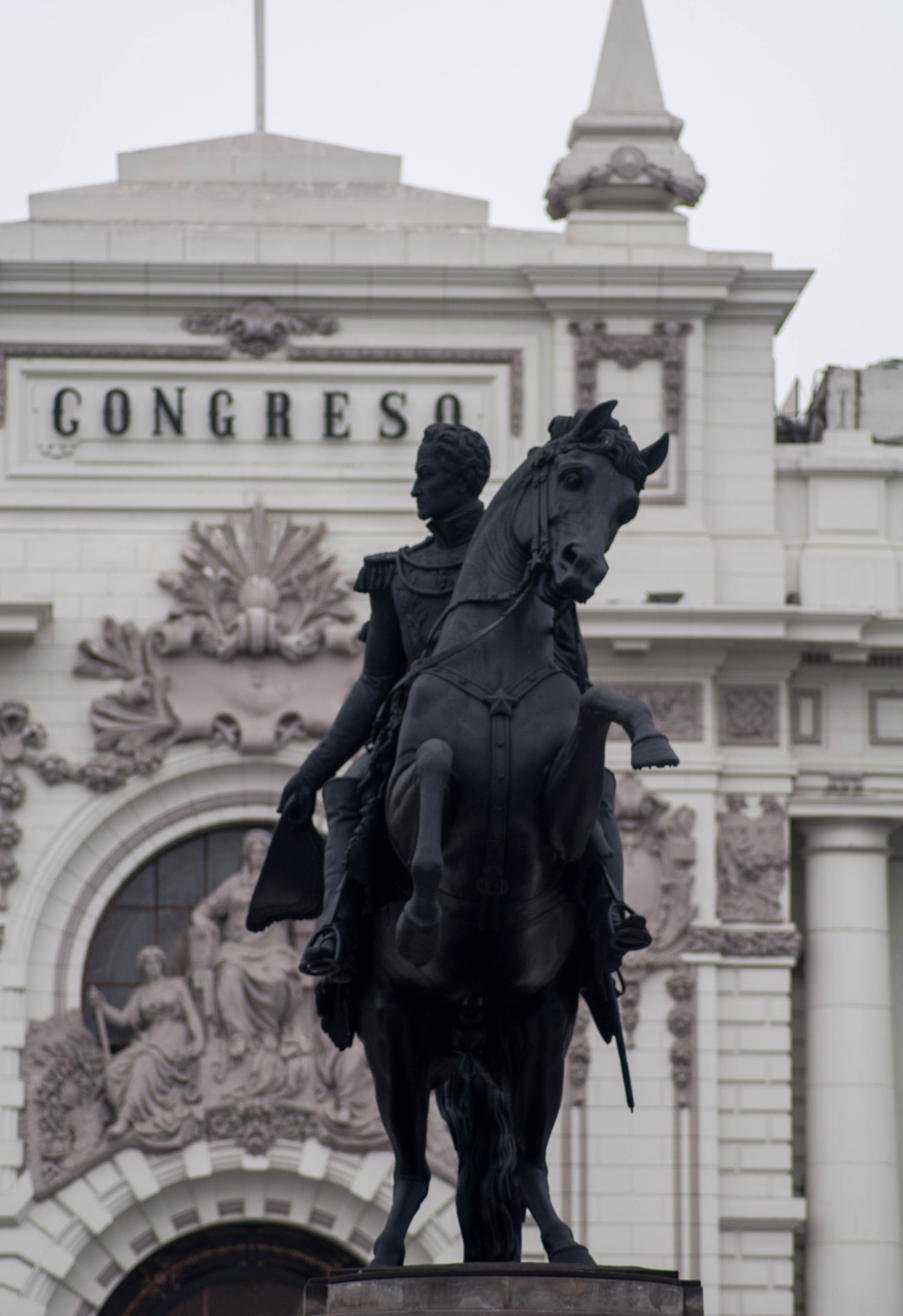
Statue of Bolivar in Plaza Bolívar, Lima

Adamo was born in Bologna into a family of sculptors, descending from his grandfather Petronio Tadolini (1727–1813).

From 1808 to 1813 he attended the Accademia di Belle Arti in Bologna under the directorship of Giacomo De Maria (1762–1838). In 1813 Adamo won a prize for sculpture awarded by the Accademia Curlandese, with a terracotta relief showing Venus and Aeneas carrying weapons. He won a four-year scholarship to Rome. During his scholarship he created a plaster statue of Ajax cursing the Gods. He came to the attention of the famed Antonio Canova and was invited to work in his studio. He worked there until 1822 when Canova helped him set up his own studio at Via Del Babuino 150 in Rome which now exists as the Canova-Tadolini Museum and is a treasury of his, and his family's, huge range of work.

His sons Scipione Tadolini (1822–1892) and Tito Tadolini (1828–1910) worked with him and Scipione took ownership of the studio on Adamo's death. The studio later passed to Giulio Tadolini (1849–1918) and finally Enrico Tadolini (1888–1967).

== Principal works ==
- Venus and Cupid (1816)
- Bust of Clotilde Tambroni on her grave in the Certosa of Bologna (1818)
- Marble statue of Ganymede and the Eagle at Chatsworth House (1823)
- Marble memorial to Monsignor Alessandro Buttaoni in the Church of S. Croce e Bonaventura dei Lucchesi in Rome (1826)
- The "Bacchante Room" in the Galleria Borghese
- The Rape of Ganymede in the Hermitage, St. Petersburg
- Marble copy of Canova's statue of Pauline Borghese
- Statue of St. Marinus in the Basilica of San Marino (1830)
- Marble Statue of St. Paul St. Peter's Square at the Vatican (1838) (probably the most public of his works)
- Marble monument to Palmira Pulieri Petracchi and Enrico Pulieri in the church of Santissime Stimmate di San Francesco in Rome (1844)
- Statue of King David in Piazza Mignanelli in Rome
- Statue of St. Robert Bellarmine in the Church of the Gesu, Rome
- Statue of St. Francis de Sales in Saint Peter's Basilica, in the Vatican, Rome (1849) (commissioned by King Carlo Alberto)
- Bronze equestrian statue of Simón Bolívar, liberator, in the Plaza Bolívar, Lima, Peru (1850s). (and the replica in the Plaza Bolívar, Caracas, Venezuela)
- Bust of Cardinal Alessandro Lante Montefeltro della Rovere in Bologna Cathedral (1858)
- Sculpture dated 1842 at the Sardhana/Sirdhanah church/Basilica of Our Lady of Graces, Sardhana India (22 km from Meerut), memorial/tomb of Joanna Nobilis Sombre/Begum Samru, wife of Walter Reinhardt Sombre. Sculpture established by David Ochterlony Dyce Sombre.
