= Scipione Tadolini =

Italian sculptor (1822–1893)

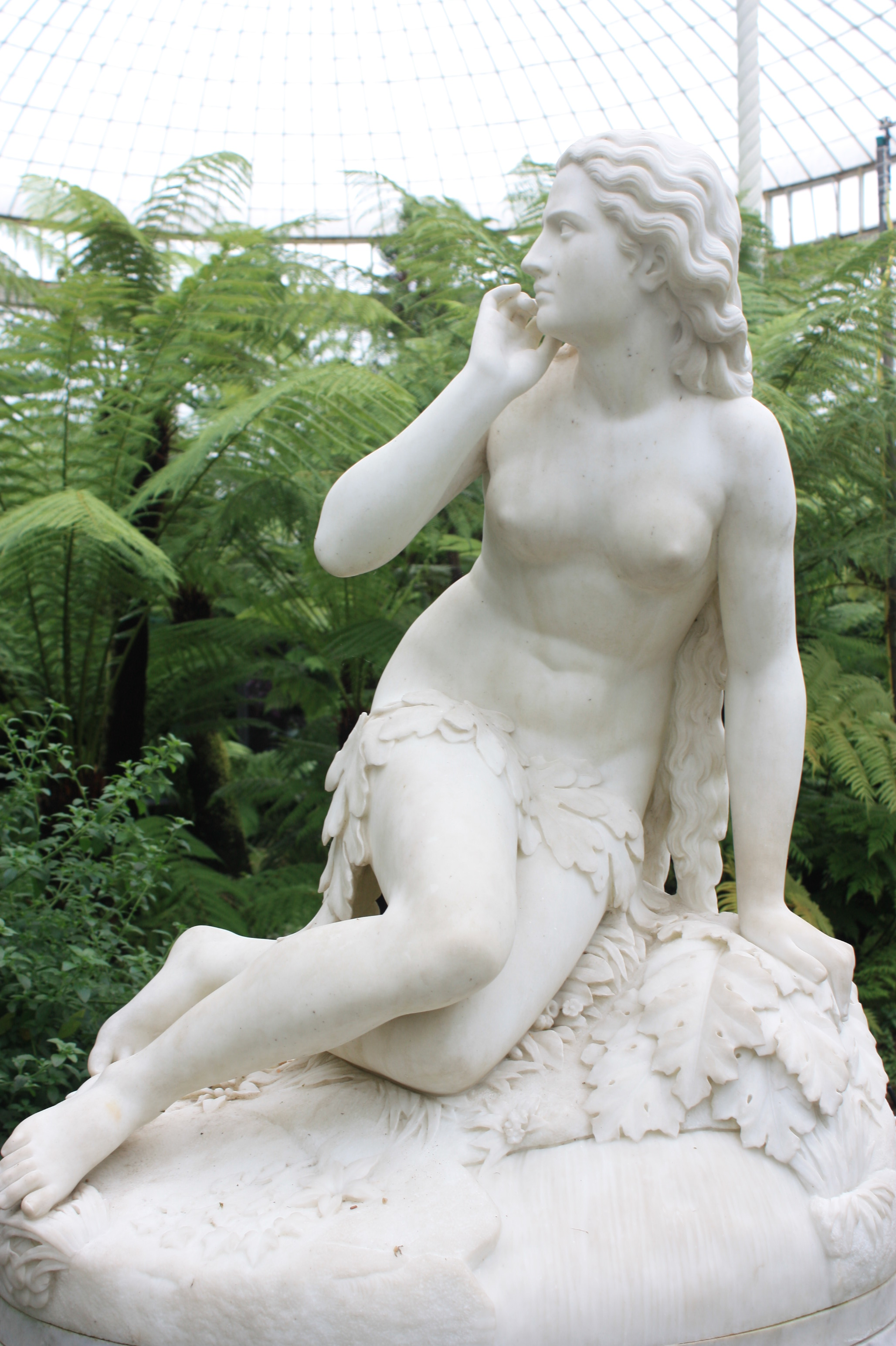
Eve by Scipione Tadolini, Kibble Palace, Glasgow

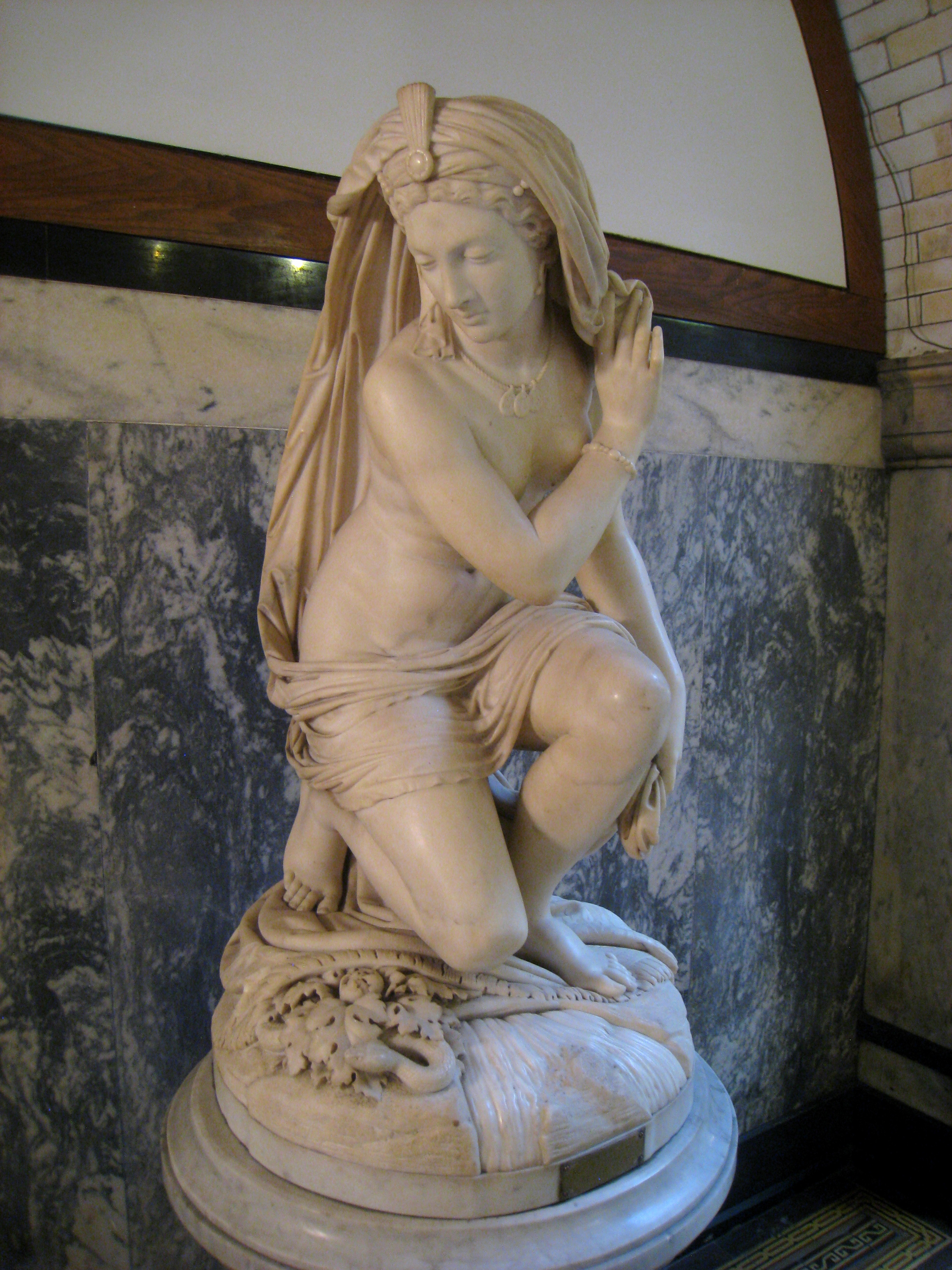
Georgian Surprised at the Bath by Scipione Tadolini

Scipione Tadolini (1822–1893) was an Italian sculptor operating in the second half of the 19th century.

== Life ==
He was the son of sculptor Adamo Tadolino (1788–1868), one of Antonio Canova's main assistants. He was the brother of the sculptor Tito Tadolini (1828–1910), and in turn father of sculptor Giulio Tadolini (1849–1918). His works were in a romantic form of the Neo-classical tradition.

Tadolini was trained in his father's studio. His first major work was Ninfa Pescatrice (Nymph Fishing) in 1846. During his career, he created a statue of Santa Lucia for the Santa Lucia del Gonfalone Church in Rome, a bust of Victor Emmanuel II of Italy, an equestrian portrait of Simon Bolivar for Lima, Peru, and St Michael Overcoming Satan, commissioned by merchant Gardner Brewer and now in Boston College. His family's studio, at 150a-b Via del Babuino, Rome, has now been restored as the Museo Atelier Canova Tadolini, which preserves the works of Canova and the Tadolini family.

== Selected works ==
- Ninfa Pescatrice (Nymph Fishing), 1846
- Seated Female Fishing, 1858
- St Michael Overcoming Satan, Boston College, USA, 1865–9
- The Greek Slave, 1871
- Eve, in the Kibble Palace, Botanic Gardens, Glasgow, c. 1875
- Ceres and Bacchus, 1881
- Figure of an Odalesque, 1882
- King Vittorio Emanuele II in the Senate, Rome
