= Giulio Tadolini =

Italian sculptor

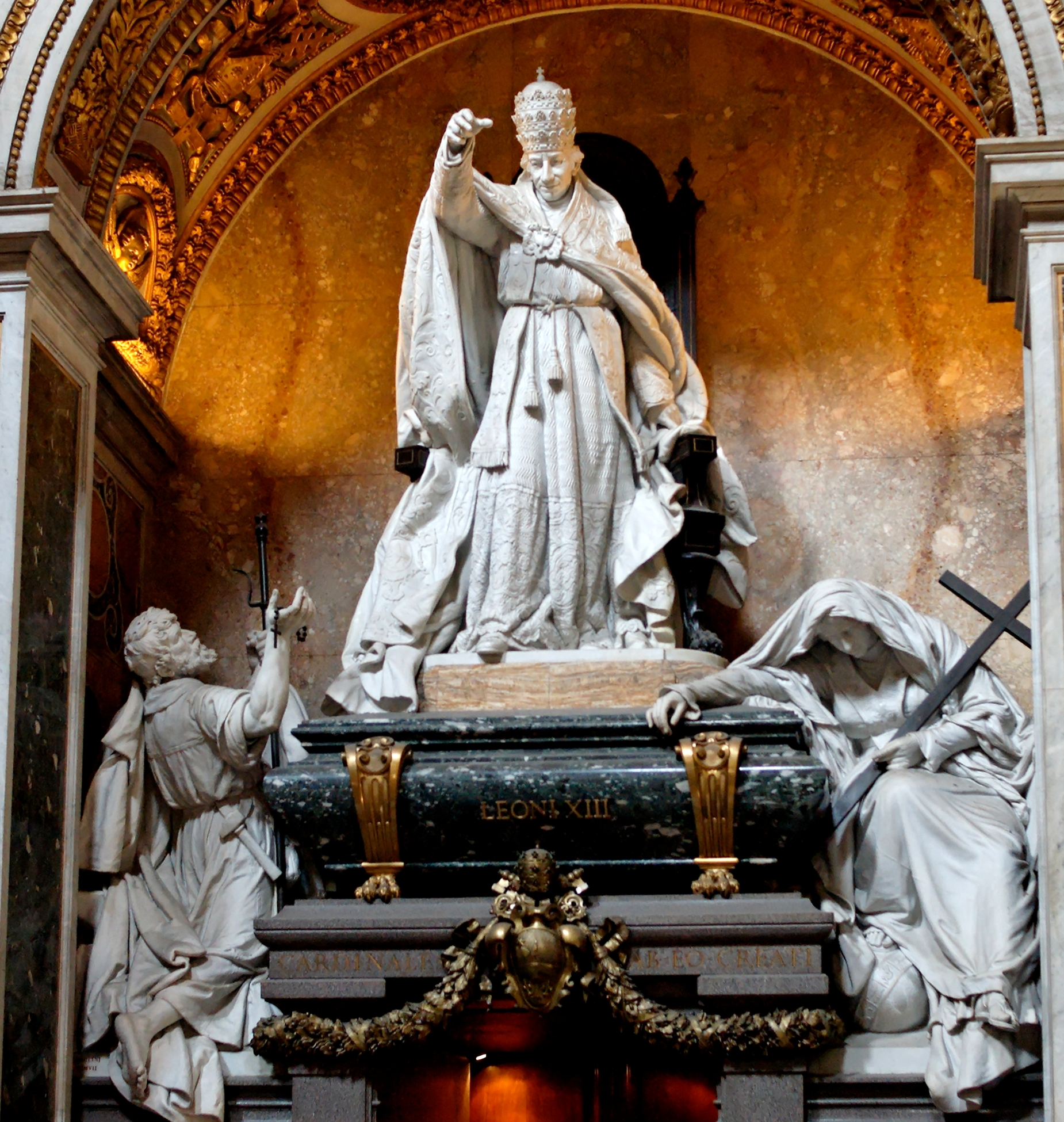
Tadolini's sculpture on the tomb of Leo XIII, Saint John Lateran, Rome

Giulio Tadolini (1849–1918) was an Academic-trained Italian sculptor.

He who was born and died in Rome, where he passed his career in the family atelier, which he inherited from his father Scipione Tadolini (1822–92), who in turn was the son of Adamo Tadolini, Antonio Canova's favourite apprentice. Giulio before becoming a sculptor, studied painting with Cesare Fracassini. Aside from his numerous portrait busts and memorial sculpture for private persons, he executed sculpture for three famous public monuments, the monument to Victor Emmanuel II in Perugia (1890) and for the funeral monuments of Umberto I of Italy (1900, Pantheon), and of Pope Leo XIII (1907, St John Lateran, see illustration'), in which Baroque conventions of gesture and iconography in polychrome and white marbles are combined with theatrical realism and bravura renditions of the textures of flesh and textiles.

The connection between the Canova and Tadolino families is evidenced in the Canova-Tadolino Museum in Rome.
