= Simón Bolívar United World College of Agriculture =

The Simón Bolívar United World College of Agriculture was part of the United World College movement, one of eighteen such schools around the world (as of 2020).

On May 31, 2012, it was formally closed as a result of action taken in September 2011 by the Venezuelan government.

The school operated under Barinas José Félix Ribas Territorial State Polytechnic University beginning in March 2012.
