= General Simón Bolívar =

City in the Mexican state of Durango

- Municipal seat and city
- Location in Mexico
- Coordinates: 24°41′N 103°13′W
- Country: Mexico
- State: Durango
- Municipality: Simón Bolívar, Durango, Mexico
- Elevation: 1,521 m (4,990 ft)

Population (2010)
  - Total: 1,321

Simón Bolívar, Durango, Mexico is a city and seat of the municipality of General Simón Bolívar, in the state of Durango, north-western Mexico. As of 2010, the town of General Simón Bolívar had a population of 1,321.
