= Instituto Simón Bolívar =

Instituto Simón Bolívar (ISB) is a private school in Xoco, Benito Juárez, Mexico City. It serves levels nursery through high school (preparatoria).

== History ==
It was founded in 1961, opening on February 2 of that year. The junior high school opened in a new building in 1963. The workshop building with a library, gymnasium, and chemistry laboratories opened in 1966. The high school opened in 1973.
