= Bolívar Square (Caracas) =

Public space in Caracas, Venezuela

Coordinates: 10°30′22″N 66°54′53″W

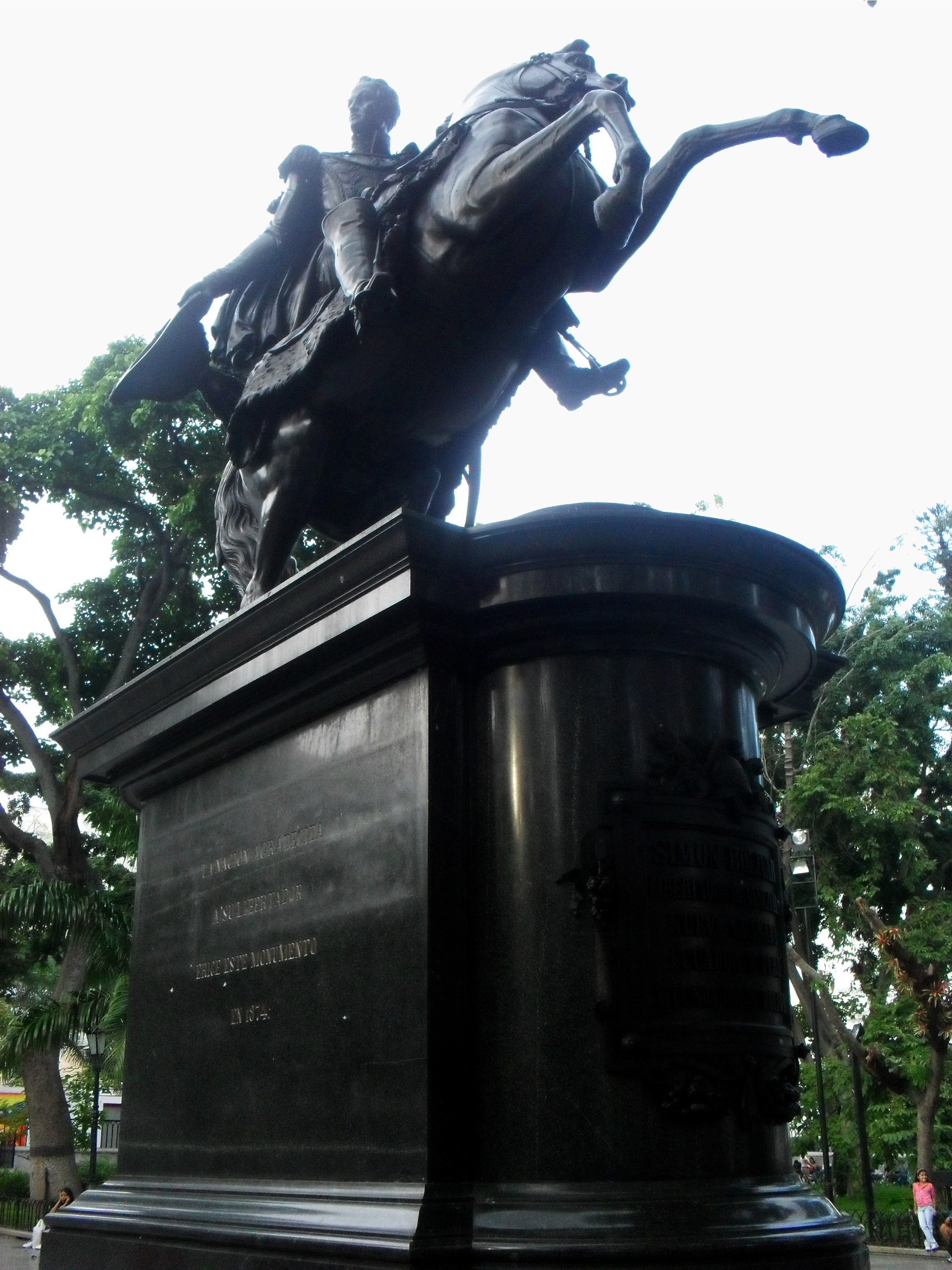
Equestrian statue of Simón Bolívar in Bolívar Square

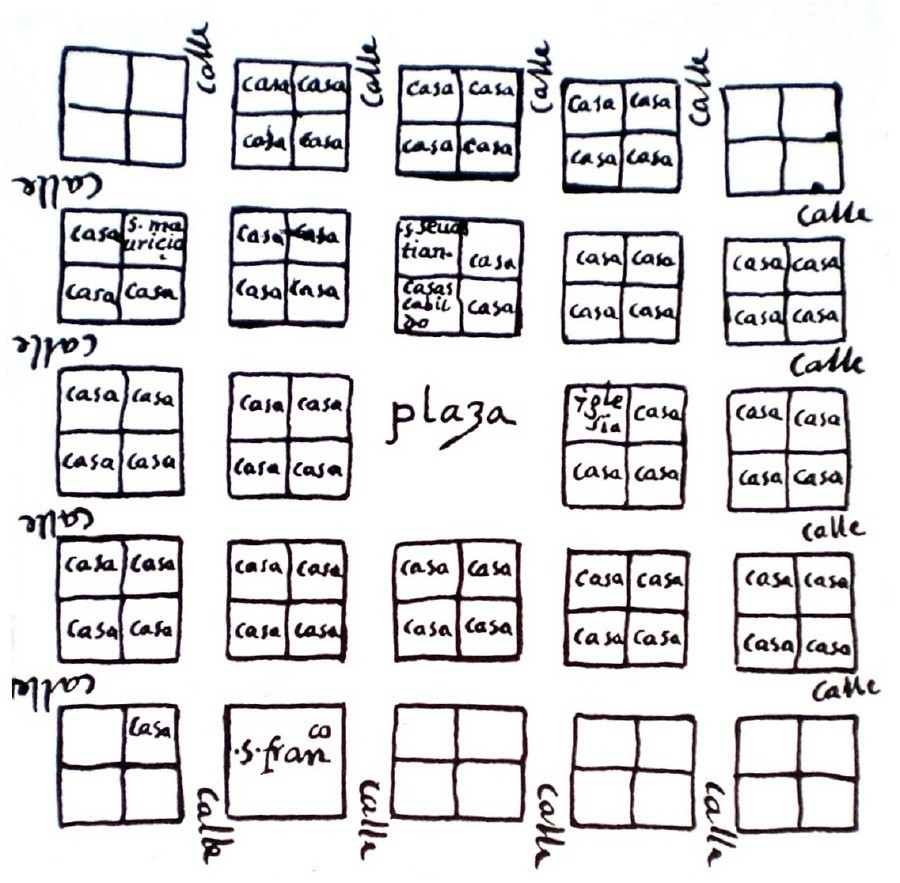
Map of Caracas by 1578 with the square on it marked as Plaza

Bolívar Square (Spanish: Plaza Bolívar) in Caracas is one of the most important and recognized Venezuelan public spaces. It is located in the center of the first 25 blocks of Caracas when it was founded as "Santiago de León de Caracas" in 1567. It is in the historic center of the city in the Cathedral Parish of the Libertador Municipality.

Bolívar Square is surrounded by important buildings such as Caracas Cathedral, Sacred Museum, Archbishop's Palace, City Hall, Chapel of Santa Rosa de Lima, the Yellow House, the Main Theater and the building of the Government of the Capital District. The Federal Legislative Palace stands to the Southwest.

== History ==
This place was intended as the Plaza Mayor of Caracas as soon as it was founded to serve as a trade center in town. For centuries, many modifications were made to the square, but one of the most significant was that of 1754 when Governor Felipe Ricardos ordered the construction of arcades to surround the square. The square was a usual place to fusillade and execute political enemies and conspirators of the Spanish colonial government. The execution of José María España was the best known. His body was quartered in the square in 1799. Additionally, this was the place where the Venezuelan people won the first step towards their independence when a popular rebellion rose against the Spanish crown on April 19, 1810.

Although it is one of the most emblematic sites in the country, it is not the largest. The Plaza Bolívar of Maracay, Aragua state, surpasses it in size, being the biggest in Venezuela and Latin America.

After independence, the square was called Plaza de Armas (Arms Square) and Plaza del Mercado (Market Square), but when the body of Simón Bolívar arrived in Caracas from Santa Marta, it was formally named Plaza Bolívar in 1842. Nevertheless, that name was not properly used until 1874.

General Antonio Guzmán Blanco was put in charge of the presidency in 1865 by the then president Marshal Juan Crisóstomo Falcón. Blanco decided to demolish the arcades around the square and remove the market vendors in May. Projects to recover the place started five years later. A renewal process with a French style square started in 1872, including the presidential decision to erect a statue of Bolívar by the month of November. Also, it was decided to build planters, plant trees, recreate the four seasons in the corners: spring, summer, autumn and winter with four fountains of ornamental iron, install about 100 iron posts with different decorations and to border the square with metal balusters. The small stairs in the southeast of the square gave name to that corner known as Gradillas, meaning small terrace corner.

== Statue ==
The statue of Simón Bolívar was inaugurated on November 7, 1874 in the center of the square with the ringing of bells and 21 guns. This is a replica of the statue by Adamo Tadolini located at the Bolivar Square in Lima, Peru. Cast by the Von Müller Foundry, Bolívar rides a horse standing on its hind legs, supported by the two tiered pedestal. It measures 4 meters high (10 feet).

The decision to install electricity in the square was made in 1894, and since then, there were no significant changes until 1967, when the original colourful floor was replaced by gray marble. Several terminal stations of the former Caracas tram worked in the corners of the square during 1908 and 1947.

On February 21, 1959, the statue was designated as a memorial. In mid-2003, the Municipality of Libertador undertook a process of full restoration of the square, including gardens, fountains, flooring, lighting, among others.

== Image gallery ==
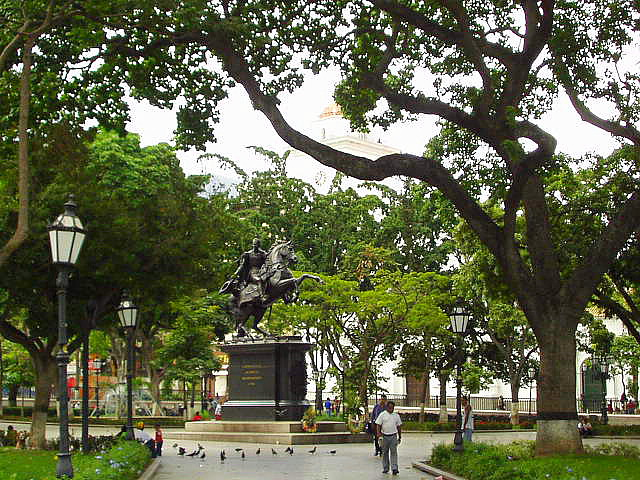
Bolívar Square of Caracas

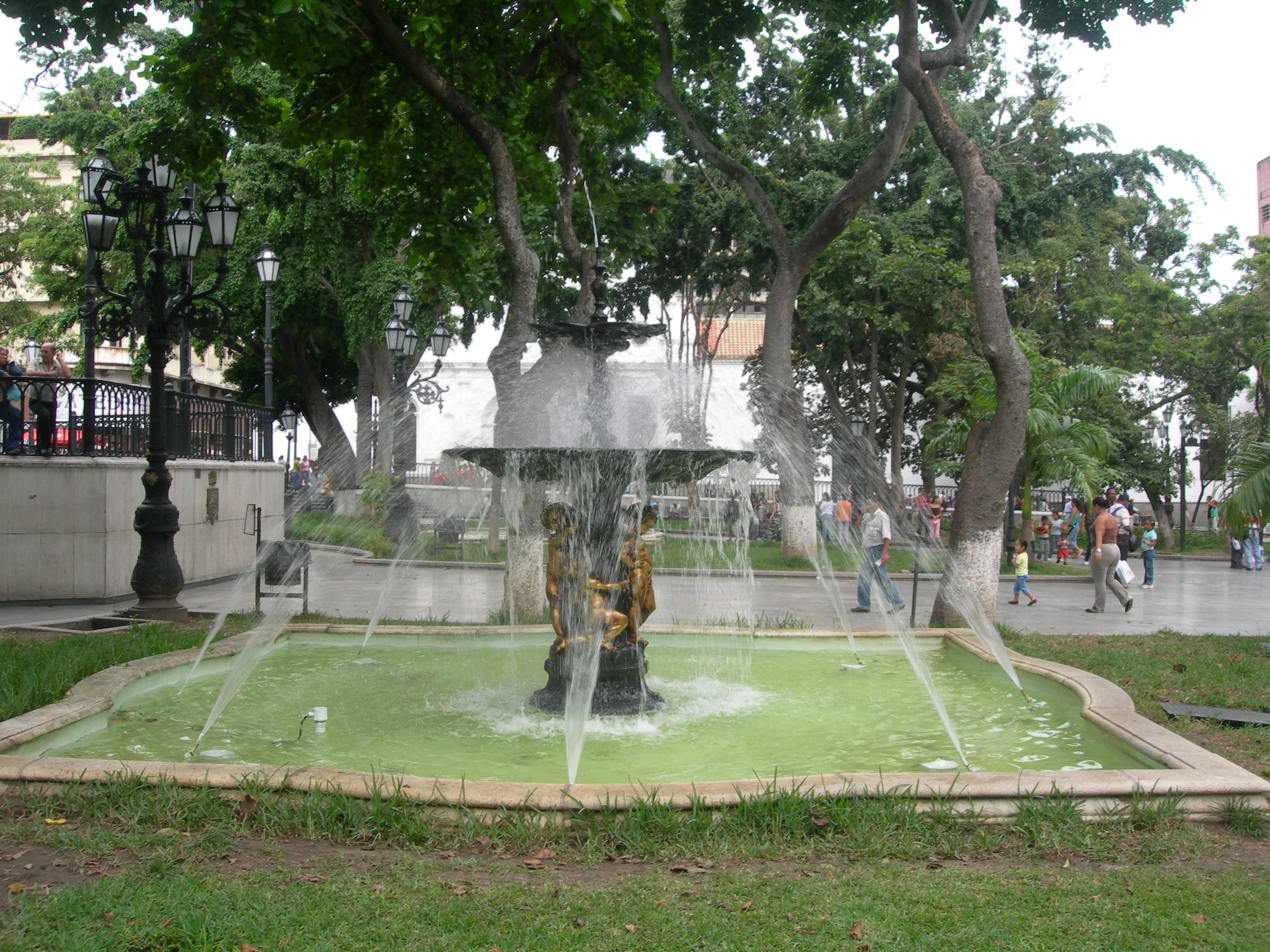
Fountain in Bolívar Square of Caracas

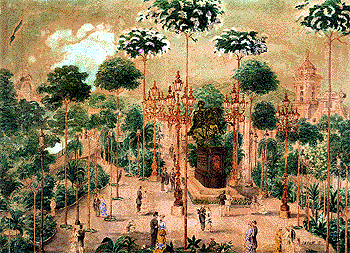
Bolívar Square soon after the inauguration of the statue

== See also ==
- Caracas
- Simón Bolívar
