= Simón Bolívar District, Paraguay =

District of Caaguazú Department, Paraguay

Simón Bolívar District is one of the districts of Caaguazú Department, Paraguay.
