= Orindatus Simon Bolivar Wall =

American attorney, politician, military officer (1825–1891)

- Born: August 12, 1825; Richmond County, North Carolina, U.S.
- Died: April 26, 1891 (aged 65)
- Burial place: Arlington National Cemetery
- Alma mater: Oberlin College, Howard University School of Law
- Spouse: Amanda Ann Thomas Wall
- Children: 5
- Military career
- Allegiance: United States
- Branch: Union Army, United States Army
- Service years: 1861–1866
- Rank: Captain
- Known for: Attorney, politician, former military officer

Orindatus Simon Bolivar Wall (August 12, 1825 – April 26, 1891), also known as O.S.B. Wall, was an American attorney, politician, and former military officer. He was African American and born enslaved but, during the American Civil War, became the first black man to be commissioned as captain in the regular U.S. Army. One of several mixed-race children of a white planter, Wall and others were freed by their father, given a bequest and guardian, and sent to Ohio to be educated at Oberlin College. After the war, Wall read the law and passed the bar.

Wall moved to Washington, DC, where he practiced law and was appointed as the city's first black justice of the peace and a police magistrate. He was twice elected to represent a white-majority district in Washington's legislative assembly. His family were among the elite African Americans in the capital.

== Early life and education ==
Orindatus Simon Bolivar Wall was born in Rockingham, North Carolina, the mixed-race son of a white planter, Stephen Wall, and his slave Priscilla. She had four children by Wall: O.S.B., Napoleon, Caroline Matilda, and Benjamin Franklin Wall. Wall also had a child with Priscilla's sister Jane, known as Sara (Sarah in some records) Kelly Wall. Wall was also involved with Rody, another enslaved woman, by whom he had two sons, John and Albert Wall. In 1838, Stephen Wall freed O.S.B., Napoleon, Caroline, Benjamin, and Sara, and sent them north to live in the Quaker settlement of Harveysburg, Ohio, trusting $1,000 for each child to their guardian, Nathan Dix. Their younger half-brothers, John and Albert, were sent to join them in 1845 after their father Stephen Wall's death. The bequest made the Wall children among the wealthiest residents of Oberlin.

Wall attended Oberlin College, established a successful footwear business in the town of Oberlin, Ohio, and then read law under John M. Langston, who was also an activist abolitionist. He married Wall's sister Caroline in 1854. Wall married fellow Oberlin student, Amanda Ann Thomas Wall.

== Activism, war and the law ==
Wall became active with Langston and other abolitionists in Oberlin, working to resist the Fugitive Slave Act of 1850. He was arrested and prosecuted for his part in the Oberlin-Wellington Rescue. Wall recruited for the Union Army and was commissioned as a captain, the first black man to achieve that rank in the regular US Army.

After the Civil War, the Walls moved to Washington, D.C., and both played active political roles during Reconstruction era. Wall graduated from Howard Law School and practiced law, being appointed by President Ulysses S. Grant as the first black justice of peace in the city. He also served as a police magistrate. He and his wife were among the elite African Americans in the capital. Wall was twice elected from a white-majority district as representative to Washington, D.C.'s legislative assembly.

After a decade, Wall became involved in a damaging scandal and charges of corruption; his reappointment as justice of the peace was rejected by the Senate. He had to struggle for a living and died in 1891. The Walls had five children who survived to adulthood; all were educated at Oberlin College. As the capital became a more hostile place to African Americans following Reconstruction era, they saw their father's life turned upside down. All suffered as opportunities began to close and discrimination in public facilities became prevalent.

== Descendants' paths ==
Within a few years of their father O.S.B.’s death, the grown children began to cut their ties to the black community and identify as white to survive, completing such changes with marriages to whites. Other African Americans shared their dismay, moving to New York City and other points north for more opportunity. The three daughters "crossed over"; one married a German engineer who worked in the West. Son Edward married a French woman and moved to Canada, where he worked for the railroads in a job reserved for whites for decades more.

Stephen Wall, the second son, had a career at the Government Printing Office. He also married a white woman. They stayed in Washington but moved to a white neighborhood and enrolled their blonde-haired blue-eyed daughter in a white school in the segregated system. His family was too well known for him (and his daughter) to escape rumors of "colored" blood. Ultimately Wall went to court, challenging anyone to show his daughter was not white. He and his wife eventually changed their names and moved to other neighborhoods in order to pass into the white community.

== See also ==
- P. B. S. Pinchback
