= Villa Simón Bolívar =

Coordinates: 17.8844°S 63.2833°W

- Town
- Interactive map of Villa Simón Bolívar
- Country: Bolivia
- Department: Santa Cruz
- Time zone: UTC-4 (BOT)
- Climate: Aw

Villa Simón Bolívar is a small town in Bolivia; It is the municipal district of Guardia Nº 4, which connects a commercial area with the capital city of the department of Santa Cruz and the Ciudad de la Guardia. It is located on the Piray river, in the tropical lowlands. It is currently a cosmopolitan nucleus with public and private institutions. In the Plaza Principal is a pink brick church, Parroquia San Mateo Apostol.
