= General Simón Bolívar Municipality =

Municipality in the Mexican state of Durango

General Simón Bolívar
- Municipality
- Municipality of General Simón Bolívar in Durango

- Location in Mexico
- Coordinates: 24°41′19″N 103°13′27″W
- Country: Mexico
- State: Durango
- Municipal seat: General Simón Bolívar

Area
  - Total: 3,470 km^{2} (1,340 sq mi)

Population (2010)
  - Total: 10,629
  - Density: 3.06/km^{2} (7.93/sq mi)
- Time zone: UTC-6 (Zona Centro)

General Simón Bolívar is a municipality in the Mexican state of Durango. The municipal seat lies at General Simón Bolívar. The municipality covers an area of 10,041 km^{2}.

In 2010, the municipality had a total population of 10,629, up from 9,569 in 2005.

In 2010, the town of General Simón Bolívar had a population of 1,321. Other than the town of General Simón Bolívar, the municipality had 54 localities, the largest of which (with 2010 populations in parentheses) were: San José de Zaragoza (1,321) and Ignacio Zaragoza (1,019), classified as rural.

== See also ==
- Simón Bolívar, the Liberator of South America, after whom these places are named.
