= Simón Bolívar (Tadolini) =

Equestrian statue by Adamo Tadolini

Simon Bolivar
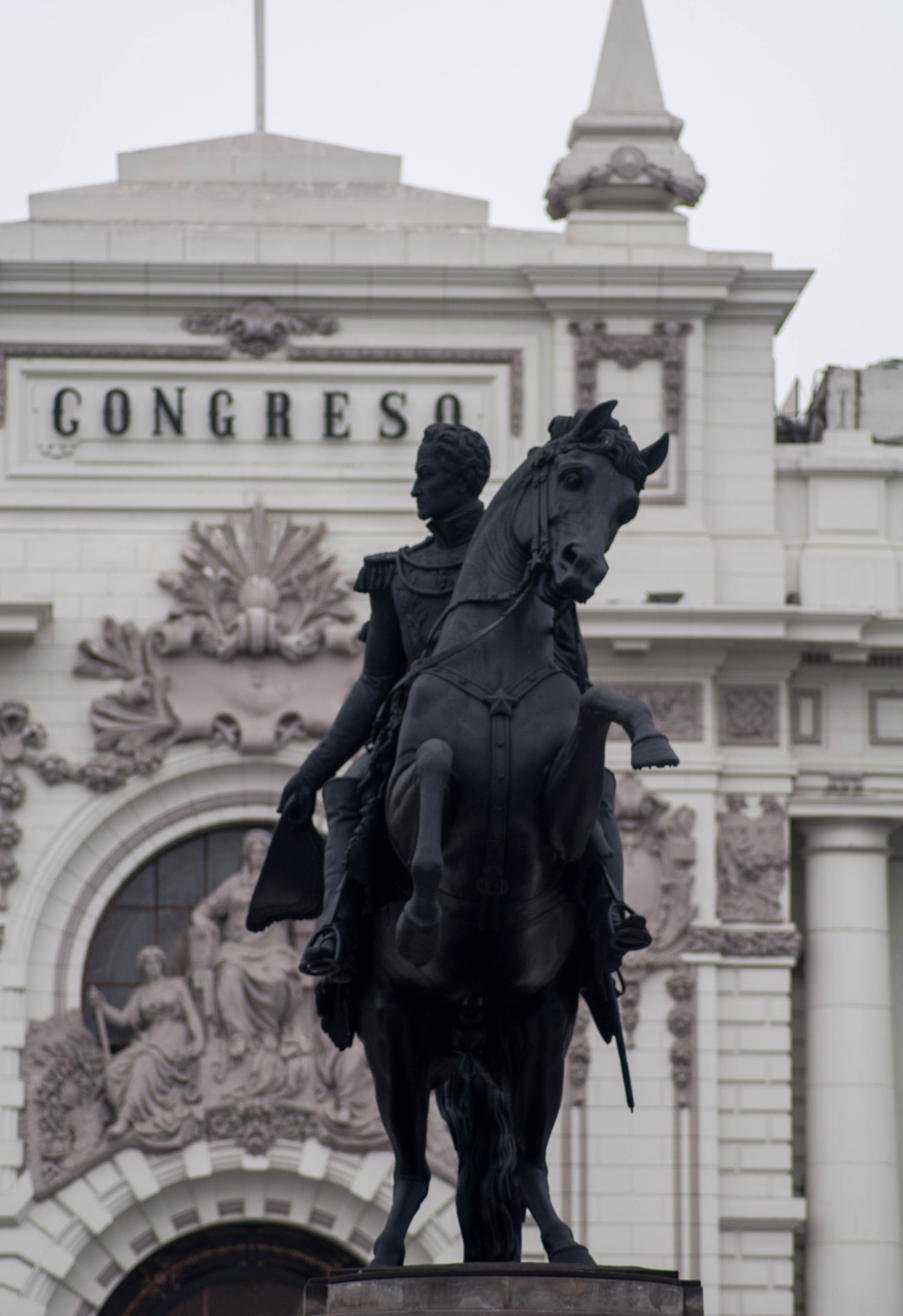
- The original statue in Plaza Bolívar in Lima (2018)
- Artist: Adamo Tadolini
- Year: 1859 (Lima)
- Type: Sculpture
- Medium: Bronze
- Subject: Simón Bolívar
- Location: Lima, Peru (1850s); Caracas, Venezuela (1870s); San Francisco, United States of America; 12.04808°S 77.02650°W

Simon Bolivar, also known as General Bolivar, is a bronze equestrian statue of Simón Bolívar by Adamo Tadolini. There are three casts. The original is located in the Plaza Bolívar in Lima, the first copy is in the Plaza Bolívar in Caracas and the second copy is in United Nations Plaza in San Francisco, California.

The statue in Lima, which was made in Italy in the 1850s, is the oldest of the three. It was cast in Munich and the replica in Caracas was cast by the same foundry after the sculptor's death. The copy in San Francisco was engineered by Miriam Gandica Mora, cast by Victor Hugo Barrenchea-Villegas and dedicated in December 1984.

== Description ==
Adamo Tadolini's sculpture depicts Simón Bolívar atop his rearing horse. Bolívar is dressed in military attire, including a decorated coat and a flowing cape. Other accessories include tall boots, epaulets and a sash. He has a sheathed sword over his left thigh, and he holds his hat on the right side of his body.

Tadolini was the pupil of the sculptor Canova, and is usually seen as working in the same neoclassical tradition. It has been suggested that the Bolívar statue was inspired by Jacques Louis David's famous painting of Napoleon Crossing the Alps. One problem Tadolini had to face, unlike the painter, was of statics: representing the horse with raised legs could cause stability problems due to the excessive weight of the bronze being supported by two legs and a tail. The Bronze Horseman by Étienne Maurice Falconet, which overcomes a similar problem, can also be seen as a forerunner of Tadolini's statue.

== Locations ==
=== Lima ===
The statue was sculpted in Rome and cast in Munich. The pedestal was completed in marble in Rome.

=== Caracas ===
On 7 November 1874, the statue was inaugurated in the center of the Plaza Bolívar with the ringing of bells and a 21 gun salute.

The Venezuelan president at the time, Antonio Guzmán Blanco, was an admirer of Bolívar. Among other measures he purchased Bolívar's birthplace (near the location of the statue) and adopted the bolívar, defined on the silver standard, as the country's currency.

=== San Francisco ===
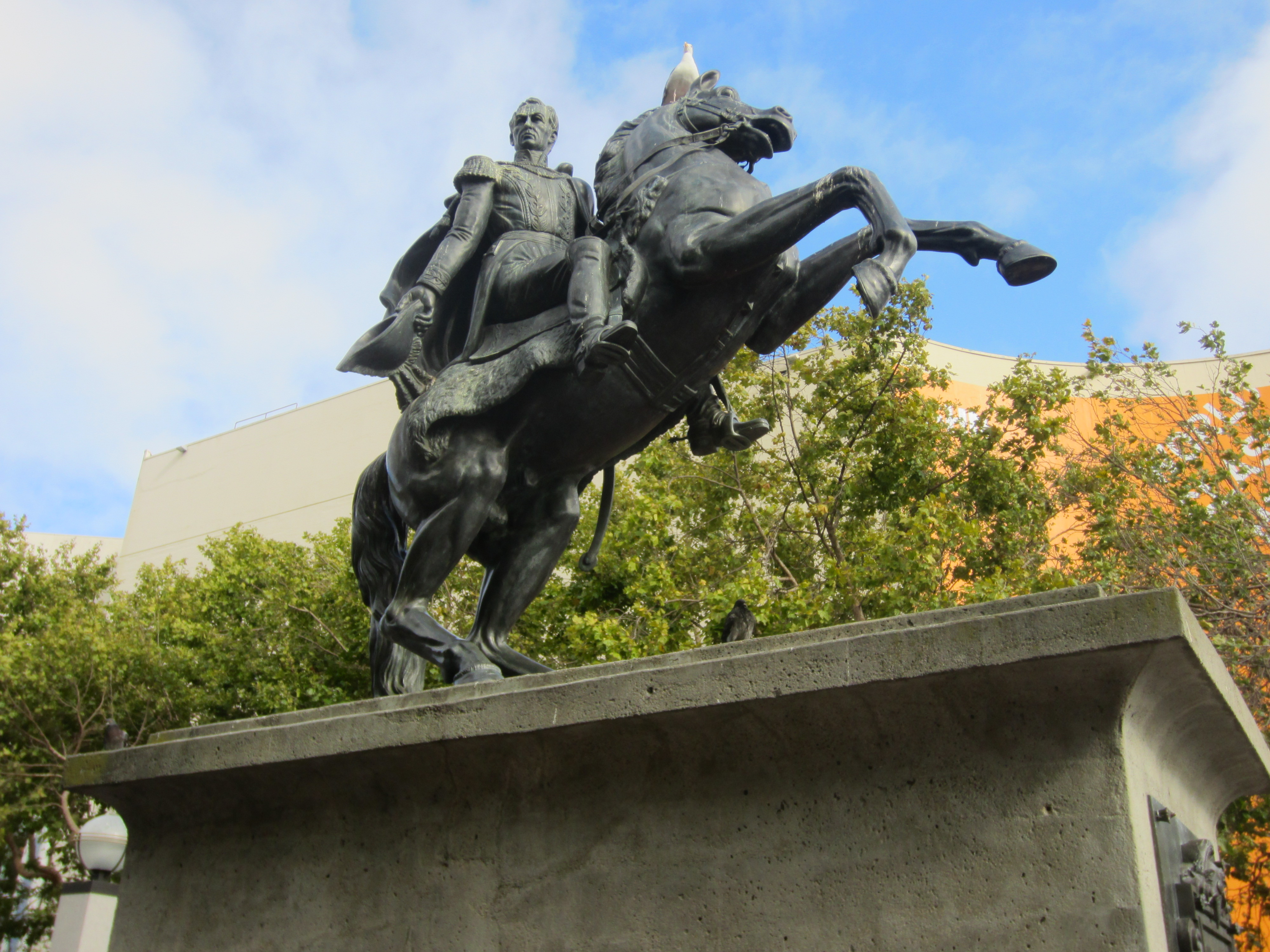
Copy in San Francisco in 2013

The San Francisco copy was engineered by Miriam Gandica Mora and cast by Victor Hugo Barrenchea-Villegas. It was dedicated on 6 December 1984. Located at United Nations Plaza at the intersection of Hyde Street and Fulton Street, the sculpture is administered by the City and County of San Francisco and the San Francisco Arts Commission. The statue was surveyed by the Smithsonian Institution's Save Outdoor Sculpture! program in 1992.

== Image gallery ==
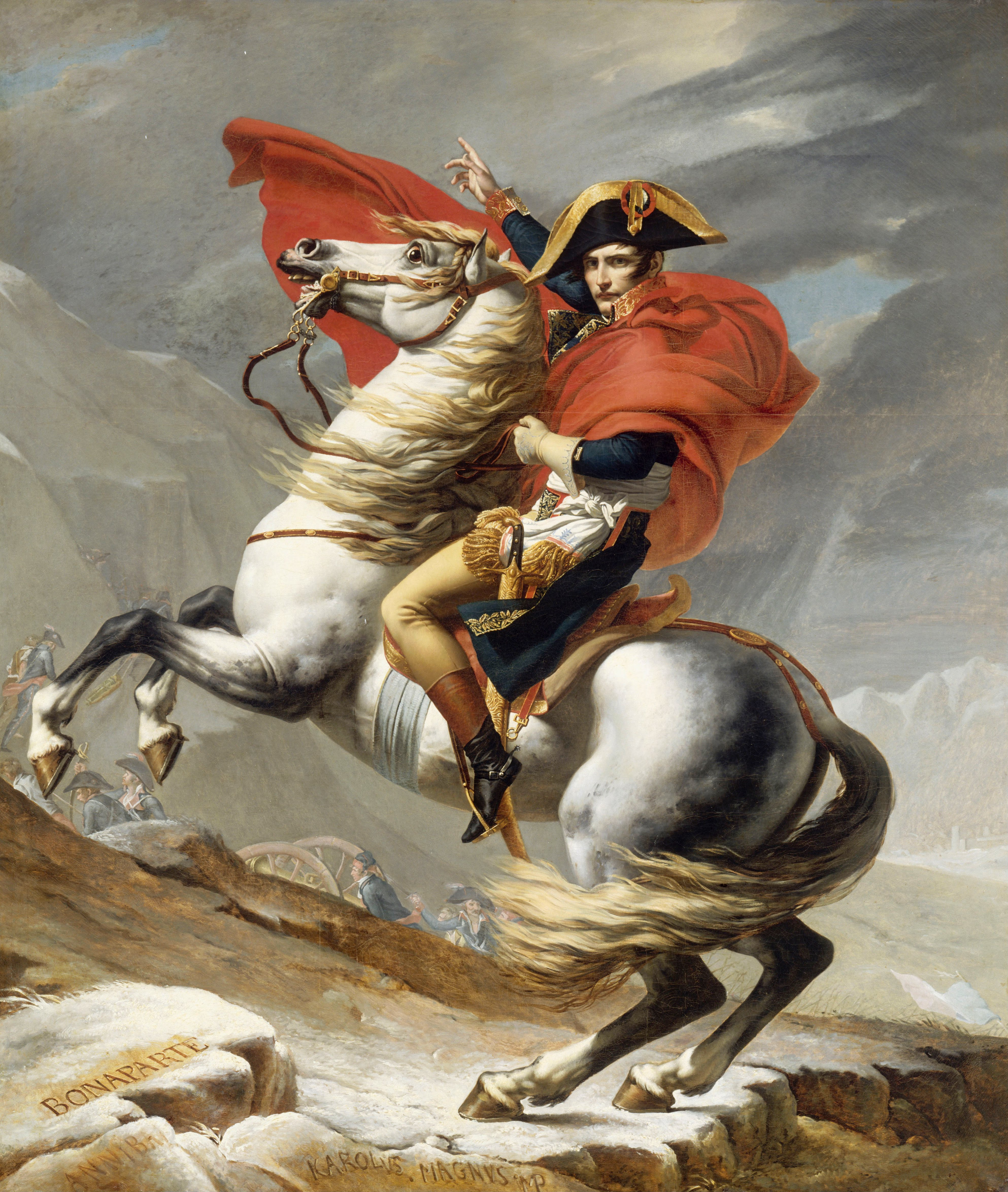
Napoleon at the Saint-Bernard Pass (1801). This painting, which exists in several versions, was a possible source of inspiration for Tadolini.

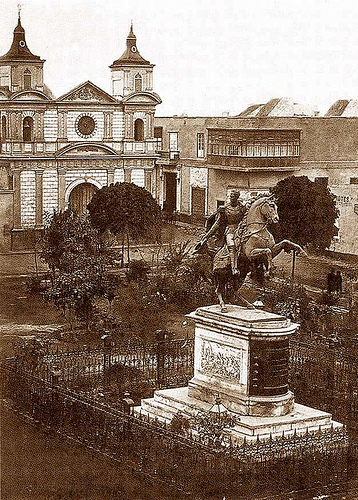
Plaza Bolívar, Lima, with the Our Lady of Charity church in the 1800s

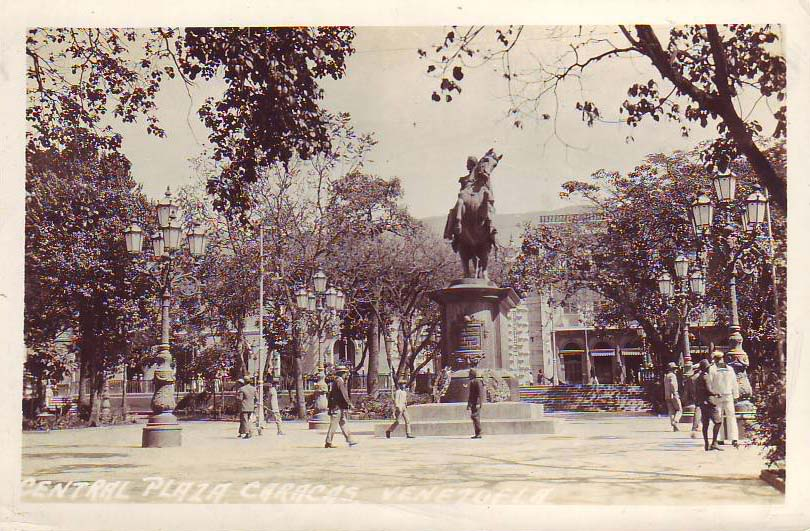
Plaza Bolívar, Caracas

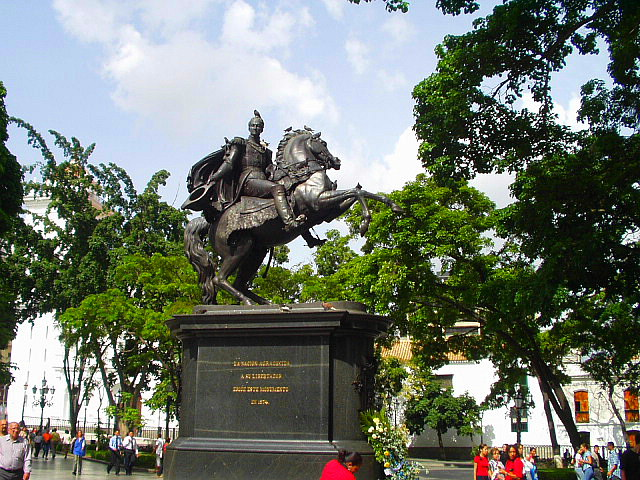
Caracas version of the statue

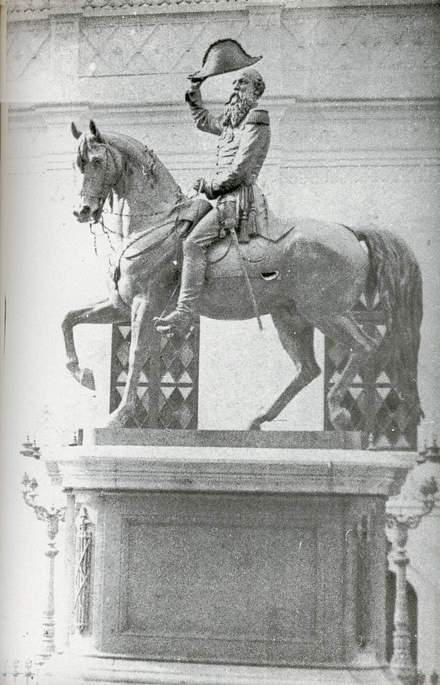
Equestrian statue by Joseph A. Bailly of Guzmán Blanco, under whose presidency the Bolívar statue was erected in Caracas

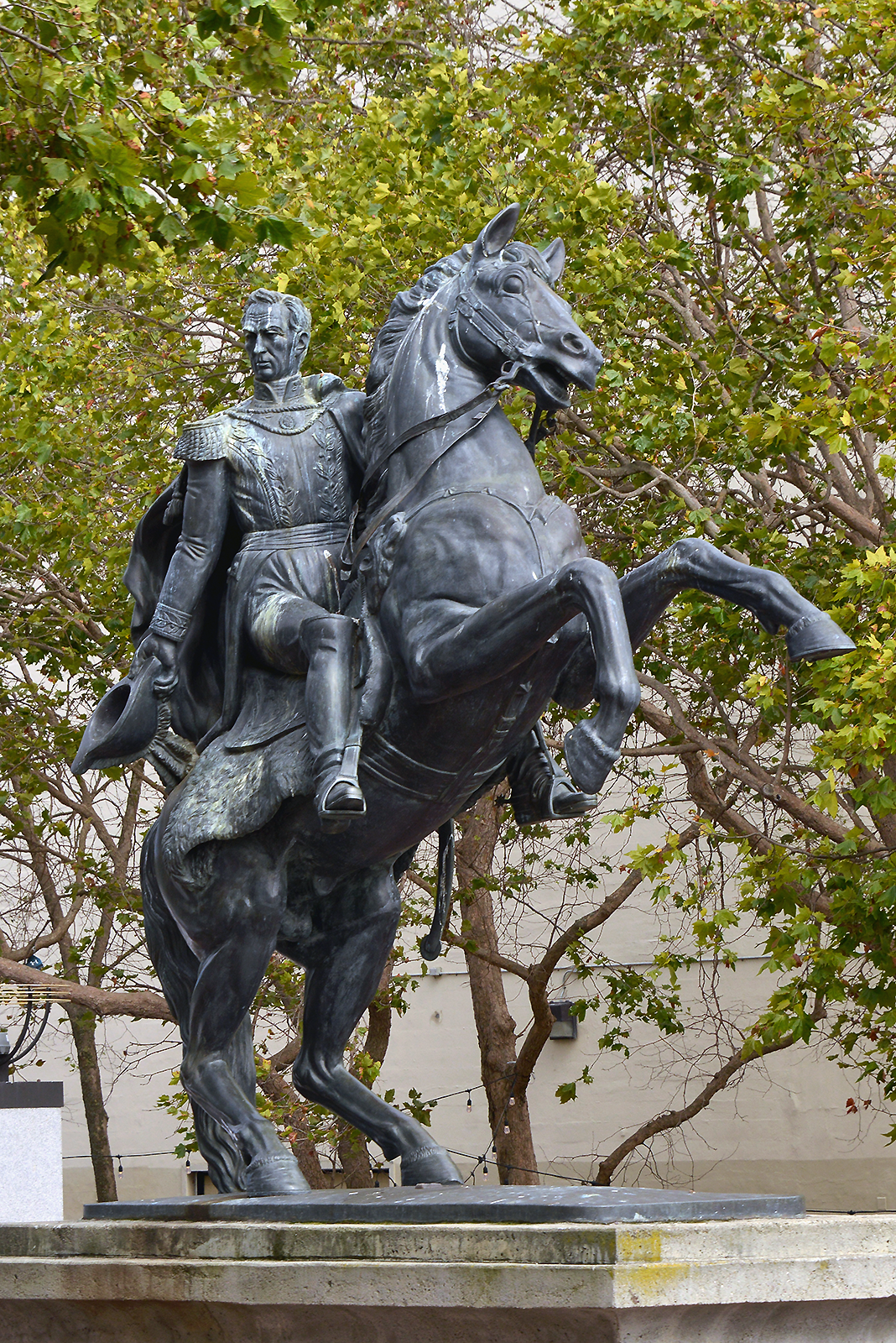
Statue of Simon Bolivar at UN Plaza, San Francisco

== See also ==
- List of equestrian statues
- List of places and things named after Simón Bolivar
- Palomo (horse)
