= List of public art in Belgravia =

This is a list of public art in Belgravia, a district in the City of Westminster and the Royal Borough of Kensington and Chelsea in London. The area is mainly composed of early 19th-century residential buildings, many of which now serve diplomatic uses. Several of the figures commemorated here were influential in the early development of Belgravia under the ownership of the Grosvenor family (later the Dukes of Westminster). Belgrave Square, which gives the locale its name, has a particularly high number of embassies; its public sculptures are therefore of a pronounced international character.

== City of Westminster ==
Image	Title / subject	Location and coordinates	Date	Artist / designer	Architect / other	Type	Designation	Notes
	Art and Architecture; Animal Husbandry and Agriculture	Norwegian Embassy, 25 Belgrave Square (Belgrave Place elevation)	1796	?	George Basevi (25–36 Belgrave Square, c. 1825)	Reliefs	Grade I	The allegorical reliefs of putti in Coade stone were originally affixed to the Danish-Norwegian Consulate in Wellclose Square, Stepney, and were reinstalled here in 1968.
	Cupid and Psyche	11 West Halkin Street	c. 1830–1840	?	?	Relief tondo	Grade II	
More images	Richard Grosvenor, 2nd Marquess of Westminster Memorial Drinking Fountain	Junction of Pimlico Road and Avery Farm Row 51.4911°N 0.1503°W	c. 1870	Salviati (mosaics)	Thomas Henry Wyatt	Drinking fountain	Grade II	An Italian Renaissance–style drinking fountain of Portland stone and granite, with mosaic panels.
	Saint Michael	Fountain Court, junction of Pimlico Road and Avery Farm Row	before 1908	?		Architectural sculpture	—N/a	A remnant of St Michael's Vicarage, which previously stood on this site.
	Obelisk	Walden House, Pimlico Road 51.4912°N 0.1507°W	c. 1930	Arnrid Johnston	—N/a	Sculptural group	Grade II	A three-sided sculptural group (badly weathered on two sides) of children playing, with a base depicting groups of animals in the round, all in Portland stone. The critic Kineton Parkes considered this to be Johnson's most important work.
More images	Angel of Light Overcoming the Powers of Darkness	33 Grosvenor Place (formerly the Associated Electrical Industries building)	c. 1956–1958	Maurice Lambert	Albert Richardson and Eric Alfred Scholefield Houfe	Architectural sculpture	—N/a	Six groups, each showing an angel killing a demon, carved in situ on the building.
	Armillary sphere finials	33 Grosvenor Place (formerly the Associated Electrical Industries building)	c. 1956–1958	Maurice Lambert	Albert Richardson and Eric Alfred Scholefield Houfe	Architectural sculpture	—N/a	Each sphere appears to encase a five-pointed star, has the signs of the zodiac on its outermost ring and rests the backs of two dragons.
More images	Fountainhead	Halkin Arcade 51.4994°N 0.1573°W	1971	Geoffrey Wickham	—N/a	Sculpture	—N/a	This work won the Royal British Society of Sculptors' Silver Medal in 1972 for the most distinguished new sculpture in London.
More images	Statue of Simón Bolívar	Belgrave Square 51.4992°N 0.1522°W	1974	Hugo Daini	—N/a	Statue	—N/a	Unveiled by James Callaghan, then Foreign Secretary, and the Venezuelan president Rafael Caldera. The statue of Bolívar in London is said to represent him as a maker of constitutions, in contrast to those in Madrid, Rome and Paris, which are equestrian. The quotation on the pedestal stresses his admiration for British institutions: I am convinced that England alone is capable of protecting the world's precious rights as she is great, glorious and wise.
More images	Great Flora L	Chesham Place 51.4977°N 0.1548°W	1978	Fritz Koenig	—N/a	Sculpture	—N/a	The sculpture stands outside the extension to the German Embassy, with which it is contemporary. It was conceived as "a fragile 'call-sign' in the heart of the surging metropolis". Flora I, a work by the same artist, is in the garden of the German Chancellery in Berlin.
More images	Hercules	Ormonde Place 51.4909°N 0.1539°W	1981	?	—N/a	Statue	—N/a	A small, bronze replica of the Farnese Hercules. Pedestal inscribed HERCULES/ THIS STATUE IS EXHIBITED/ BY WATES LIMITED/ MAY 1981.
More images	Homage to Leonardo Leonardo da Vinci	Belgrave Square Gardens	1982	Enzo Plazzotta and Mark Holloway	—N/a	Sculpture	—N/a	Based on Leonardo's drawing of the Vitruvian Man. Completed by Holloway, Plazzotta's studio assistant, after the elder sculptor's death in 1981. Funded by the American construction magnate John M. Harbert.
More images	Statue of Christopher Columbus	Belgrave Square 51.4985°N 0.1536°W	1992	Tomás Bañuelos	—N/a	Statue	—N/a	Given by the people of Spain in commemoration of the 500th anniversary of Columbus's voyage. His birth date is mistakenly given as 1446 on the pedestal.
More images	Statue of José de San Martín	Belgrave Square 51.5000°N 0.1535°W	1994	Juan Carlos Ferraro	—N/a	Statue	—N/a	A gift of the Anglo-Argentine community in Argentina, unveiled by the Duke of Edinburgh. San Martín is depicted in general's uniform with his bicorne hat held casually in his right hand, while in his left he holds a trailing sword below the hilt. An inscription reads His name represents democracy, justice and liberty.
More images	Statue of Wolfgang Amadeus Mozart	Orange Square, corner of Ebury Street and Pimlico Road 51.4908°N 0.1529°W	1994	Philip Jackson	—N/a	Statue	—N/a	The composer is portrayed at the age of eight, when he stayed at 180 Ebury Street for the summer and autumn of 1764; he wrote his first two symphonies there. The statue was proposed to mark the bicentenary of Mozart's death in 1991.
More images	Statue of Robert Grosvenor, 1st Marquess of Westminster	Wilton Crescent 51.5004°N 0.1538°W	1998	Jonathan Wylder	—N/a	Statue	—N/a	The developer of Belgravia is shown studying plans of the area, his foot resting on a milestone inscribed CHESTER/ 197/ MILES, a reference to his estate at Eaton Hall in Cheshire. On either side sit two talbots, the supporters from his coat of arms. An inscription on the pedestal reads WHEN WE BUILD, LET US THINK WE BUILD FOR EVER‍—‌a slight misquotation from John Ruskin's Seven Lamps of Architecture (1849).
	Armillary sphere	Belgrave Square Gardens	2000	?	—N/a	Armillary sphere	—N/a	A gift from the Duke of Westminster to mark the beginning of the third millennium. The inscription on the rim is taken from William Blake's "Auguries of Innocence" (1803): To see a world in a grain of sand and a heaven in a wild flower, hold infinity in the palm of your hand and eternity in an hour.
More images	Statue of Henry the Navigator	Belgrave Square 51.4992°N 0.1548°W	2002	José Simões de Almeida	—N/a	Statue	—N/a	Unveiled 12 February 2002 by Jorge Sampaio, the President of Portugal. A cast of a statue in Vila Franca do Campo on São Miguel Island, erected in 1932 to commemorate the quincentenary of the arrival of the Portuguese to the Azores. The Portuguese Embassy is at 11 Belgrave Square.
	Bust of George Basevi	Belgrave Square Gardens 51.4989°N 0.1529°W	2002	Jonathan Wylder	—N/a	Bust	—N/a	Basevi was responsible for the design and construction of Belgrave Square in 1825–1840.
	Slate Wall	Montrose Place	2007	Andy Goldsworthy		Wall	—N/a	Part of the 10 Montrose Place development
	Water's Murmur	Kinnerton Street	2009	Julian Stocks	KSS	Perforated steel screen	—N/a	A map of London, this commemorates the "lost" River Westbourne, whose course runs under the street.
	Bicameral	Chelsea Barracks, near the Pimlico Road entrance	2019	Conrad Shawcross	Structure Workshop (engineers)	Sculpture	—N/a	Unveiled 7 November 2019. A tree-like aluminium structure assembled with only pins and dowels, using techniques from Japanese joinery. The title comes from The Origin of Consciousness in the Breakdown of the Bicameral Mind (1976) by Julian Jaynes.
	The Friendship Bench	Halkin Arcade	2020	Gillie and Marc	—N/a	Sculpture	—N/a	Sculpture of the artists' alter egos Dogman and Rabbitwoman seated on a bench. Another cast is installed at the Clos Pegase Winery in California.

== Royal Borough of Kensington and Chelsea ==
Image	Title / subject	Location and coordinates	Date	Artist / designer	Architect / other	Type	Designation	Notes
More images	The Jeeves Ladies	Outside Jeeves shop, Pont Street	1974	Kate McGill	—N/a	Sculptural group	—N/a	Based on the logo, depicting two gossiping Edwardian ladies out shopping, designed by Derrick Holmes for the dry cleaning firm Jeeves of Belgravia. Holmes also produced the maquette for the sculpture.

== Bibliography ==
- Asprey, Ronald; Bullus, Claire (2009). The Statues of London. London and New York: Merrell. ISBN 978-1858944722.
- Blackwood, John (1989). London's Immortals: The Complete Outdoor Commemorative Statues. London and Oxford: Savoy Press. ISBN 978-0951429600.
- Bradley, Simon; Pevsner, Nikolaus (2003). London 6: Westminster. The Buildings of England. London and New Haven: Yale University Press. ISBN 978-0-300-09595-1.
- Cavanagh, Terry (2023). Public Sculpture of Kensington and Chelsea with Westminster South-West. Public Sculpture of Britain. Vol. 22. Watford: Public Statues and Sculpture Association. ISBN 978-1-8383976-2-3.
- Fraser, Inga (2014). "The 'English Independents': Some twentieth-century women carvers". Sculpture Journal. 23 (3): 369–78. doi:10.3828/sj.2015.8.
- Kershman, Andrew (2013). London's Monuments. London: Metro Publications. ISBN 978-1-902910-43-7.
- Matthews, Peter (2018). London's Statues and Monuments. Oxford: Shire Publications. ISBN 978-1-78442-256-1.
- Westminster City Council (23 October 2013). Conservation Area Audit: Belgravia (PDF).
