= Hugo Daini =

Italian sculptor

- Born: 14 July 1919; Rome, Italy
- Died: 26 December 1976 (aged 57); Caracas, Venezuela
- Education: Accademia di Belle Arti di Roma
- Occupation: Sculptor
- Spouse: Maria Grazia Daini (m. 1930)
- Children: 4

Hugo Daini (28 January 1919 – 26 December 1976) was an Italian sculptor mainly active in Venezuela in the second half of the twentieth century. A relevant part of his career is related to monumental work connected to the Simón Bolívar iconography and traditional heroic statuary, of which he left significant examples in London, Caracas, Brussels, and other cities of Venezuela. In his individual and smaller-scale works, where he truly expressed his artistic nature, he played with the human figure joining sculptural dynamism with empty spaces.

Daini's artistic career was marked by several notable publications and references. His works have been featured in various art publications and catalogues, documenting his contributions to the field of sculpture, particularly in the genres of monumental and expressionist works.

== Biography ==
Hugo Daini was born in Rome on 28 January 1919, the son of a Carabinieri officer and former member of the Italian Legation in China. His early years were shaped by his grandfather's passion for art, exploring Rome's monuments and beginning to depict his grandmother at the age of 9. He commenced formal art studies at 12, attending courses for adolescents at the Scuola d'Arte Sacra dell'Oratorio di San Pietro. By 14, he was already working as an assistant to sculptors Torquato Tamagnini and Lorenzo Ferri in Rome.

In 1939, Daini enrolled at the Accademia di Belle Arti in Rome. His studies were interrupted when he was recruited by the Italian army and became one of the first 100 paratroopers during World War II. He resumed his studies and graduated in 1946. The following year, he began teaching art at the artistic high school affiliated with the Accademia di Belle Arti in Rome and renewed his collaboration with sculptor Lorenzo Ferri, contributing to a nativity scene at the Vatican.

In 1947, Daini received a scholarship from the Italian Ministry of Education and exhibited for the first time at the Galleria Il Cortile in Rome. The next year, he received another scholarship from the Italian National Olympic Committee and participated in the 1948 Summer Olympics in London, where art competition was included. Representing Italy alongside Greco and Mazzacurati, his sculpture Japanese Wrestlers was exhibited at the Victoria and Albert Museum.

In 1949, Daini relocated to Venezuela.

In 1950, Hugo married Maria Grazia (Mitzi) Fruhwirth. They were introduced by a common friend, Hugo Moretti in the historic Caffe Greco in Rome.

In Caracas Hugo solidified his career as a sculptor known for monumental and smaller-scale works with an expressionist tendency. His equestrian statues of Simón Bolívar and other Venezuelan historical figures are prominently displayed in Caracas, Brussels, Santo Domingo, London, and major Venezuelan cities.

Daini's works gained international acclaim, with representation and sales through art galleries in Montreal, Canada, and New York.

Throughout his career, he held numerous solo exhibitions in Caracas, London, and Montreal, receiving various awards.

Hugo Daini died in Caracas on 26 December 1976. His artistic legacy lives on through his daughter Rita (1954) who also became a well known sculptor.

== Works ==
The works of Daini can be divided into two main types. First the monumental work of the classical heroic iconography; mainly associated with Venezuela historical figures with bronze monuments ranging from 2 to 4 m and a linear and formal style, never excessive and partially influenced by Cubism. Then the individual bronze sculptures, mostly influenced by an Expressionist tendency, with different subjects and a different conception of volume and spaces.

=== Public works and monuments ===
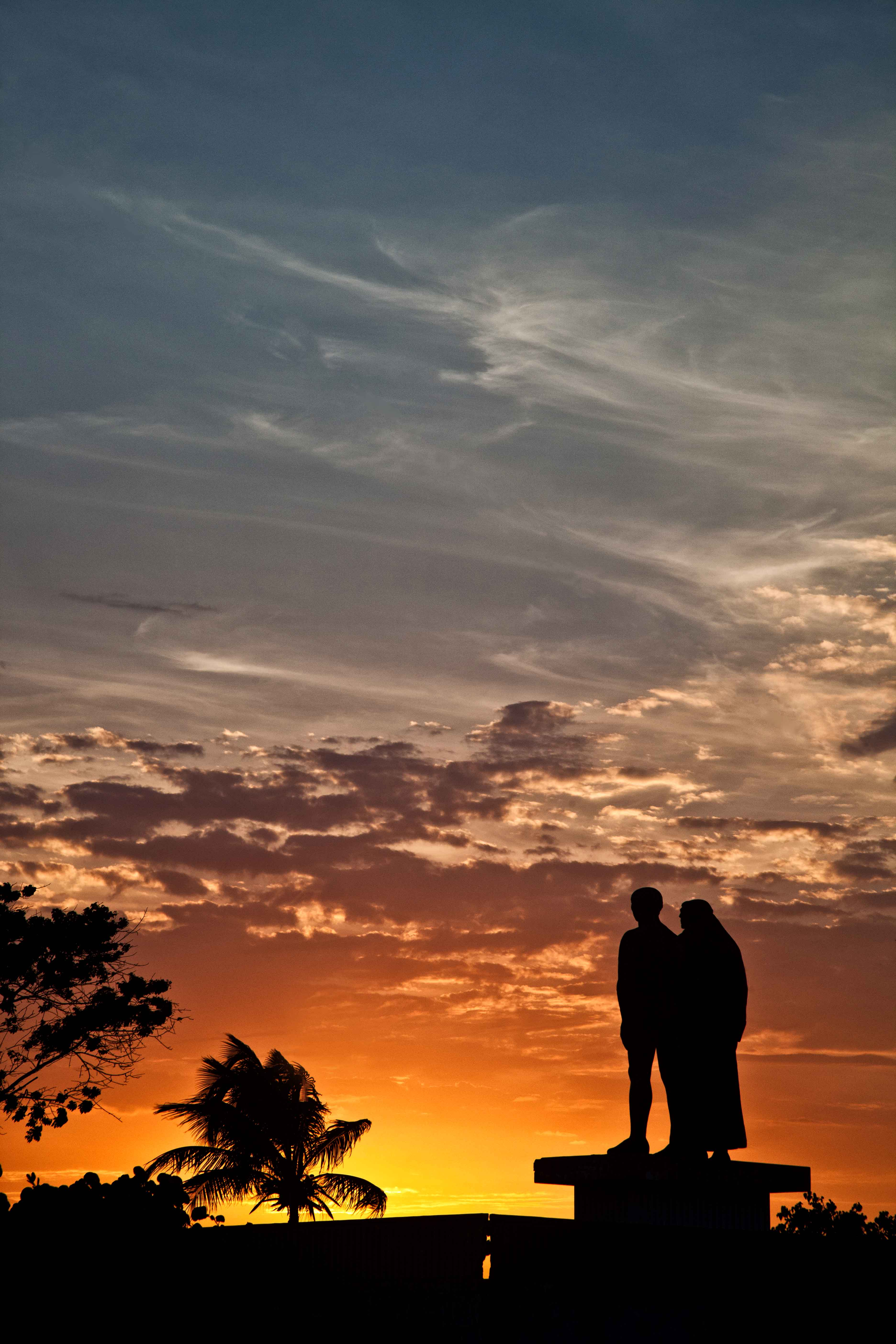
Monument to the Founders of Cumaná, the Monk and the Indian

Daini's monumental work started a few years after his arrival in Venezuela with the monological statue of Simón Bolívar at the Exposición Objetiva Nacional in Caracas, in 1952. From there and for the next 20 years he crafts over 30 exceptional works including bronze statues and reliefs which are displayed in squares, avenues and building in Caracas, main Venezuelan cities and abroad. This line of work is associated with the traditional heroic statues with a particular reference to the Venezuelan historical figures, from Simón Bolívar to Francisco de Miranda. His Monumental works are characterised by a very formal definition, which is never excessive but straight to the point. The style denotes sobriety, however never lacking attention to details. From the definition of the lines and shapes it is possible to understand his initial influence by Cubism. Among some notable examples of the Venezuelan historical figures stream we have the standing statue of Simón Bolívar in Belgrave Square, London (1972), the 5 equestrian statues of Simón Bolívar (1964) and the Francisco de Miranda standing statue in Caracas (1968). A more broad work is the contribution to Paseo Los Próceres (Boulevard for the National Heroes), where he crafted a series of reliefs representing steps of the Venezuela history and independency, and a series of military statues (1957). Perhaps one of the most important examples of his public work is the Monument to the Founders, erected in Cumaná in 1966, which transitions the style to his private and individual works.

=== Main monumental works ===
- Estatua Monolítica de Simón Bolívar (chalk, 9m, 1952, Caracas)
- Fuente, estatuas y relieves del Paseo los Próceres (marble, 1957, Caracas)
- Relieve Casa de Italia (marble, 1957, Caracas)
- Mural de Ladrillos Edificio Diana (1959, Caracas)
- Santiago Mariño (bronze, 3m, 1960, Turmero)
- Agustín Codazzi (bronze, 2.10m, 1963, Caracas, Barquisimieto)
- José Antonio Páez (bronze, 3m, 1964, Acarigua)
- Simón Bolívar equestrian (bronze, 3m, 1964–65, Píritu Barinas, Colón, Santo Domingo, Brussels)
- Monument to the Founders (bronze, 4m, 1965–66, Cumaná)
- Simón Bolívar (bronze, 2.4m, 1973, London)

=== Individual works ===
The main concept of his individual smaller-scale works is the contraposition between space, emptiness, figures and volumes. He is eliminating part of the volume, substituting it with spaces and negative forms which the imagination has to fill, creating emptiness and defying gravity. Daini's main character is the human figure which embeds a humanistic analysis. The result is a dynamic and light style, conceptual but never abstract.

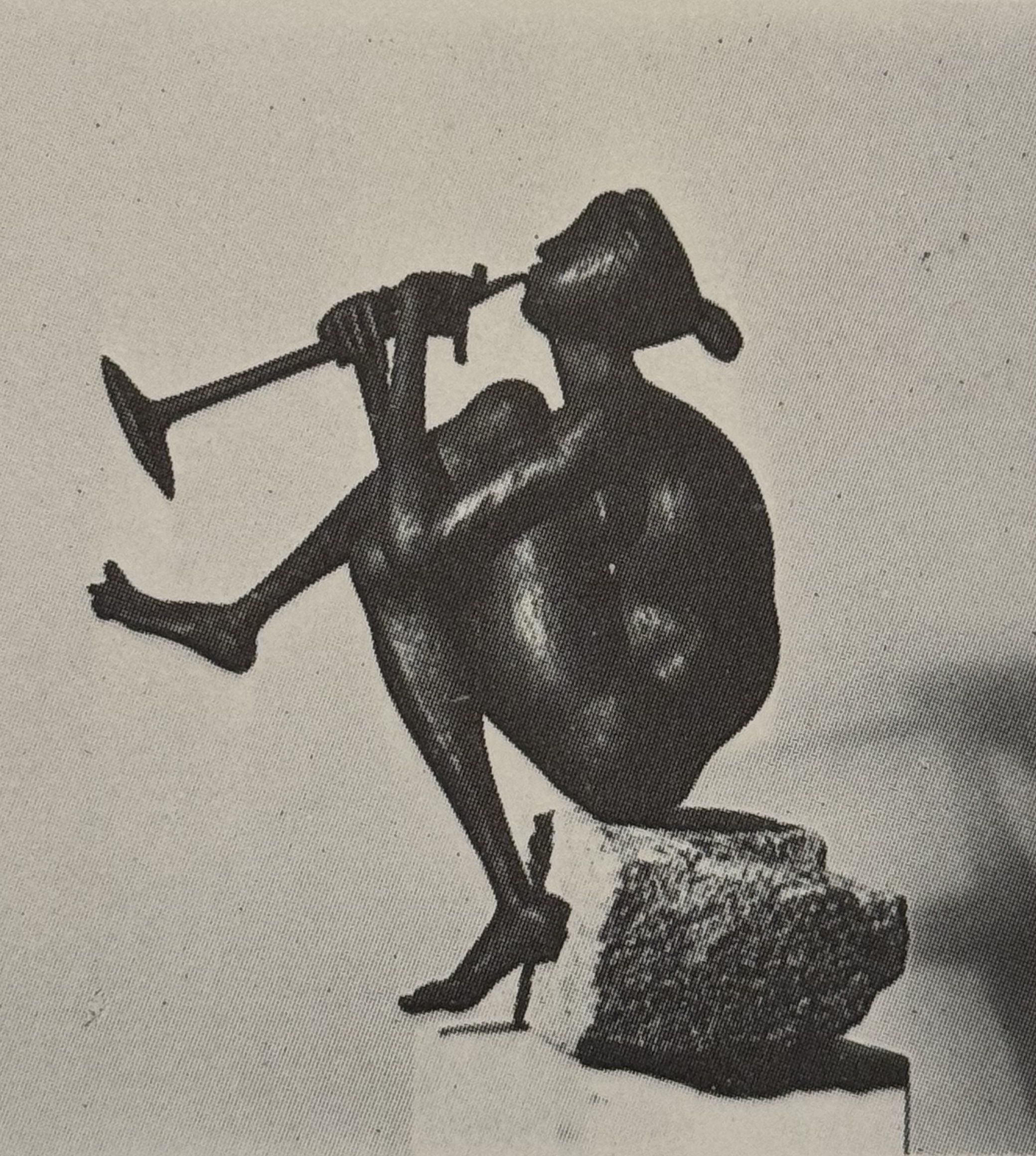
Flautista, bronze, 63 cm, 1970

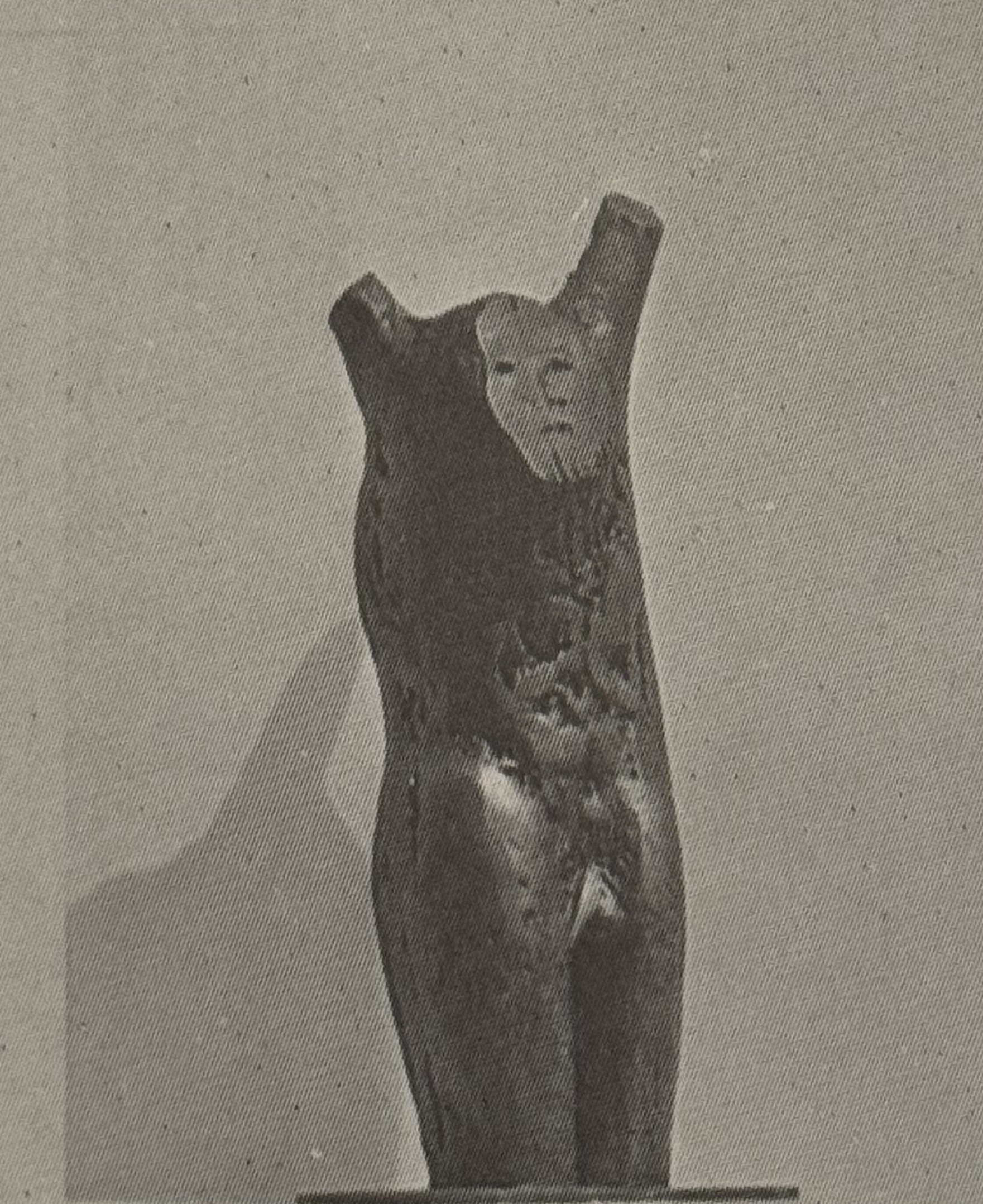
Torso, bronze, 58 cm, 1971

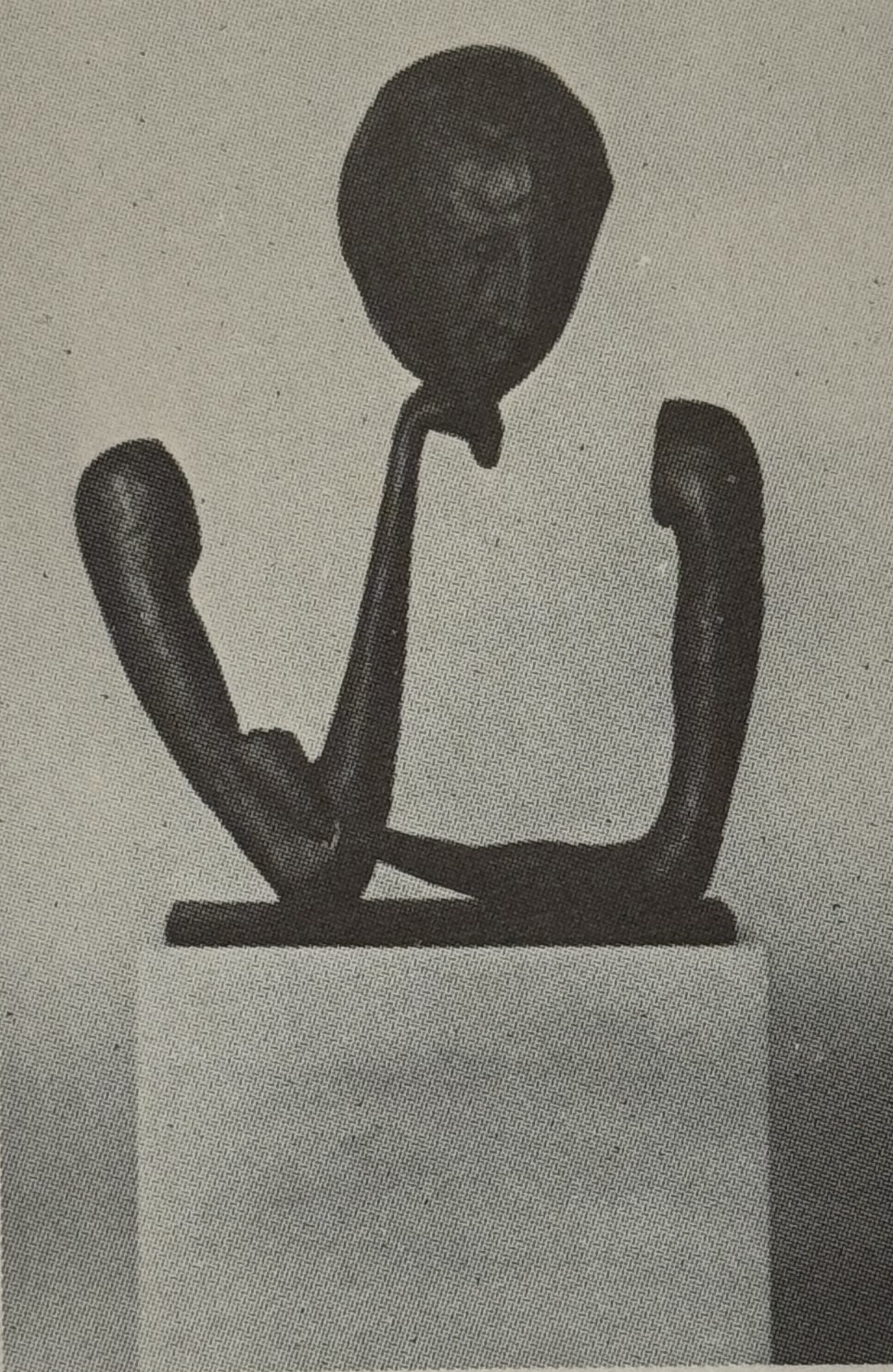
Joven en la Ventana, bronze, 35 cm, 1971

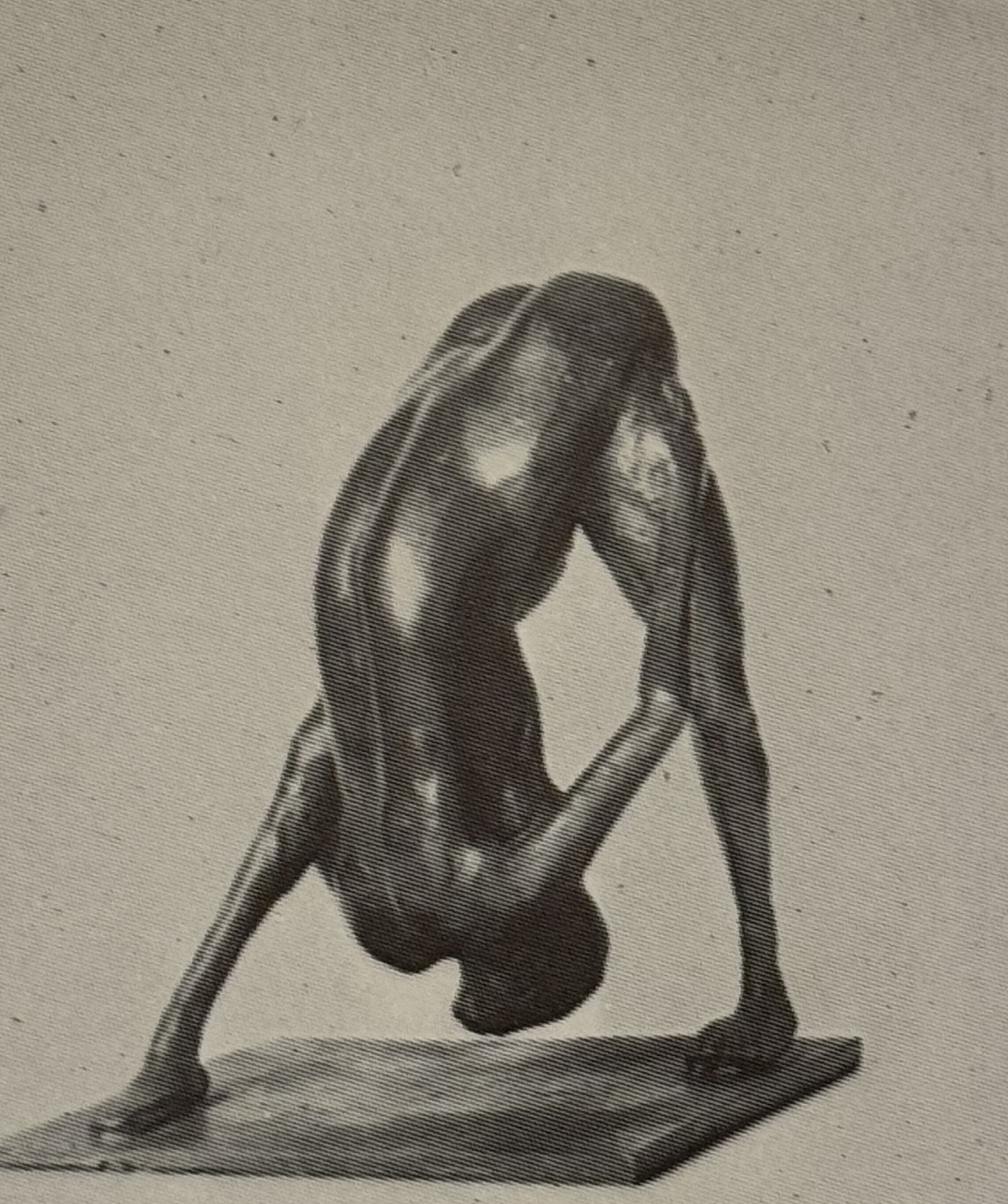
Contorsionista, bronze, 25 cm, 1971

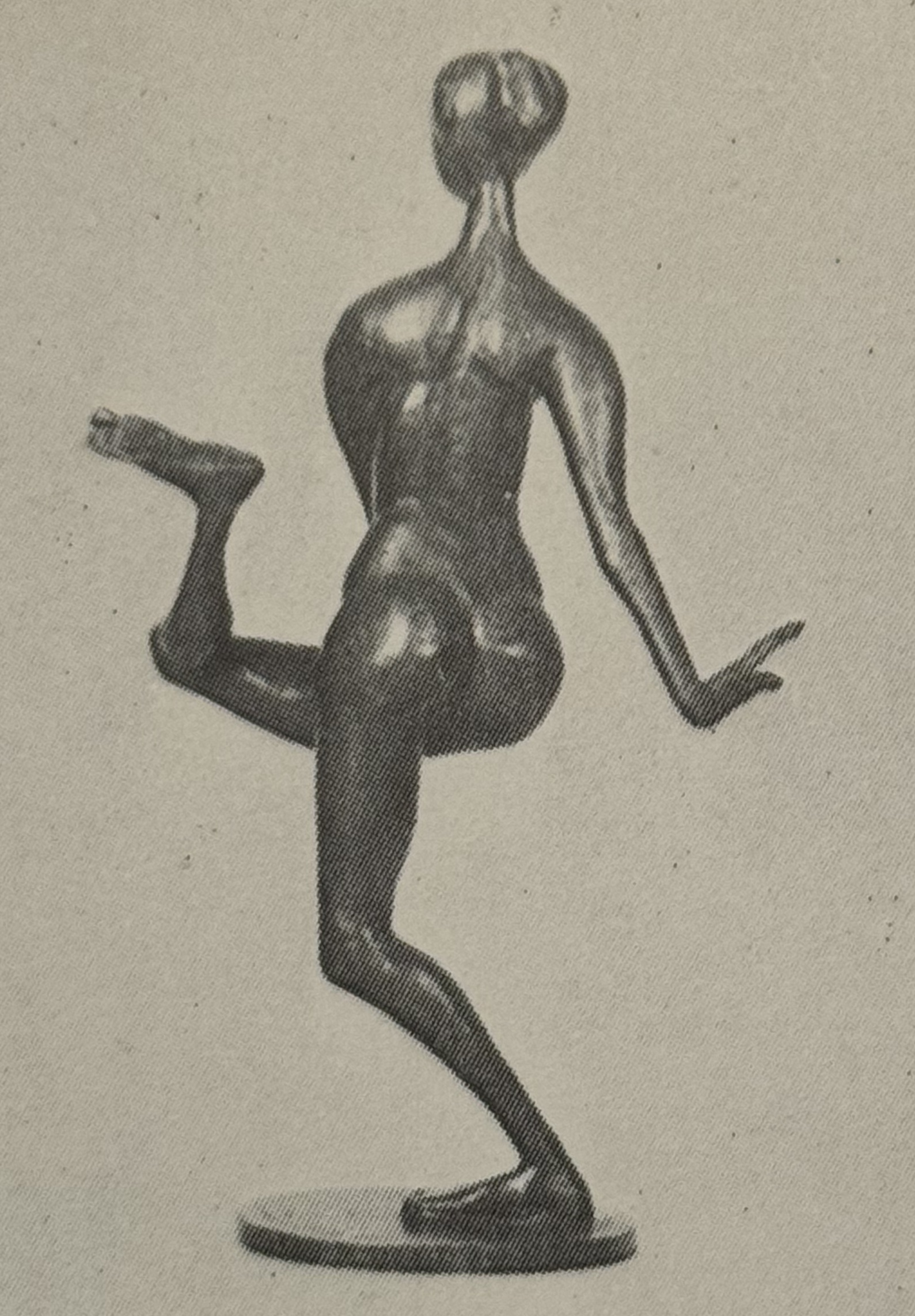
Bailarina, bronze, 33 cm, 1972

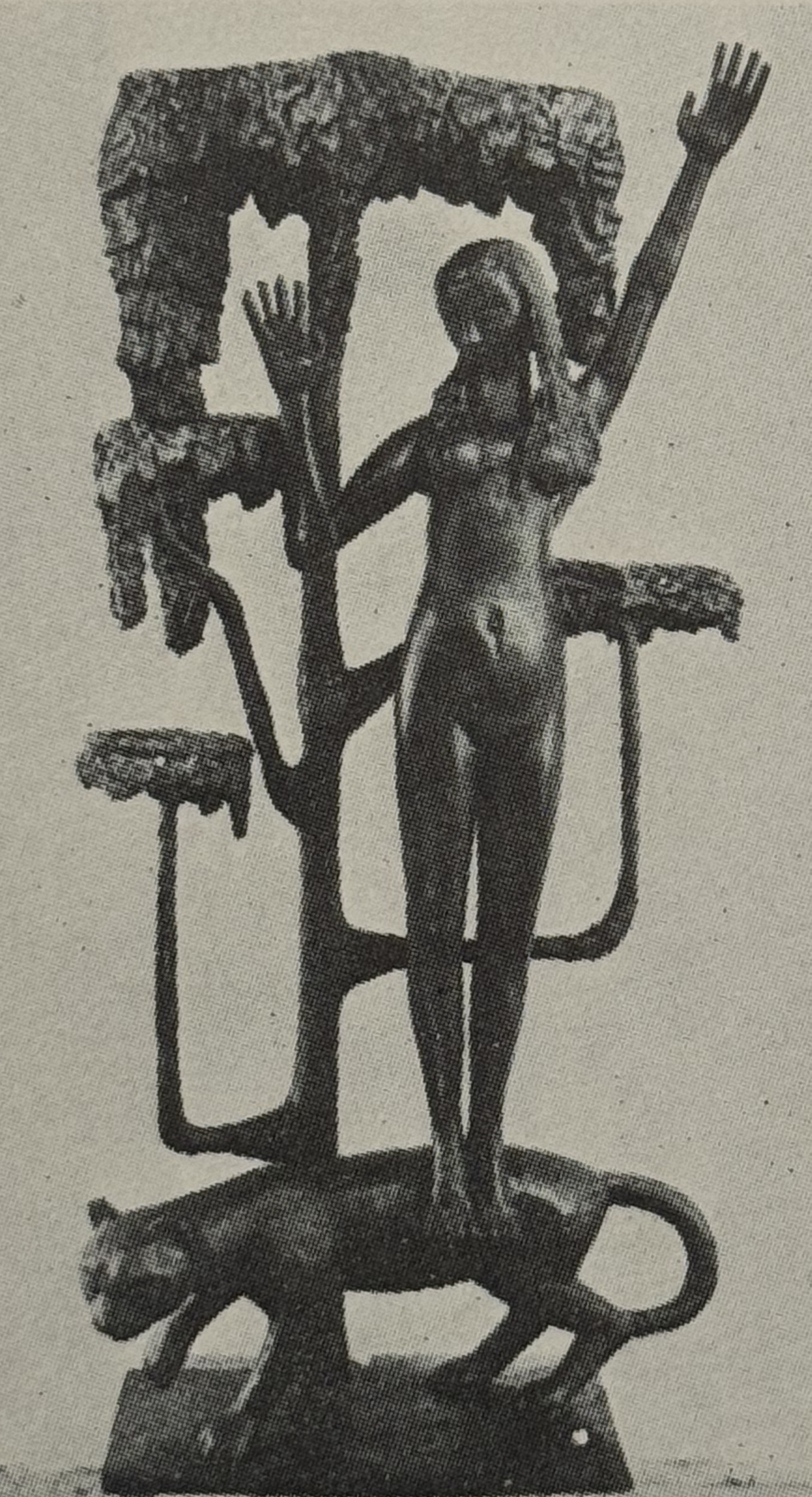
María Lionza, bronze, 114 cm, 1973

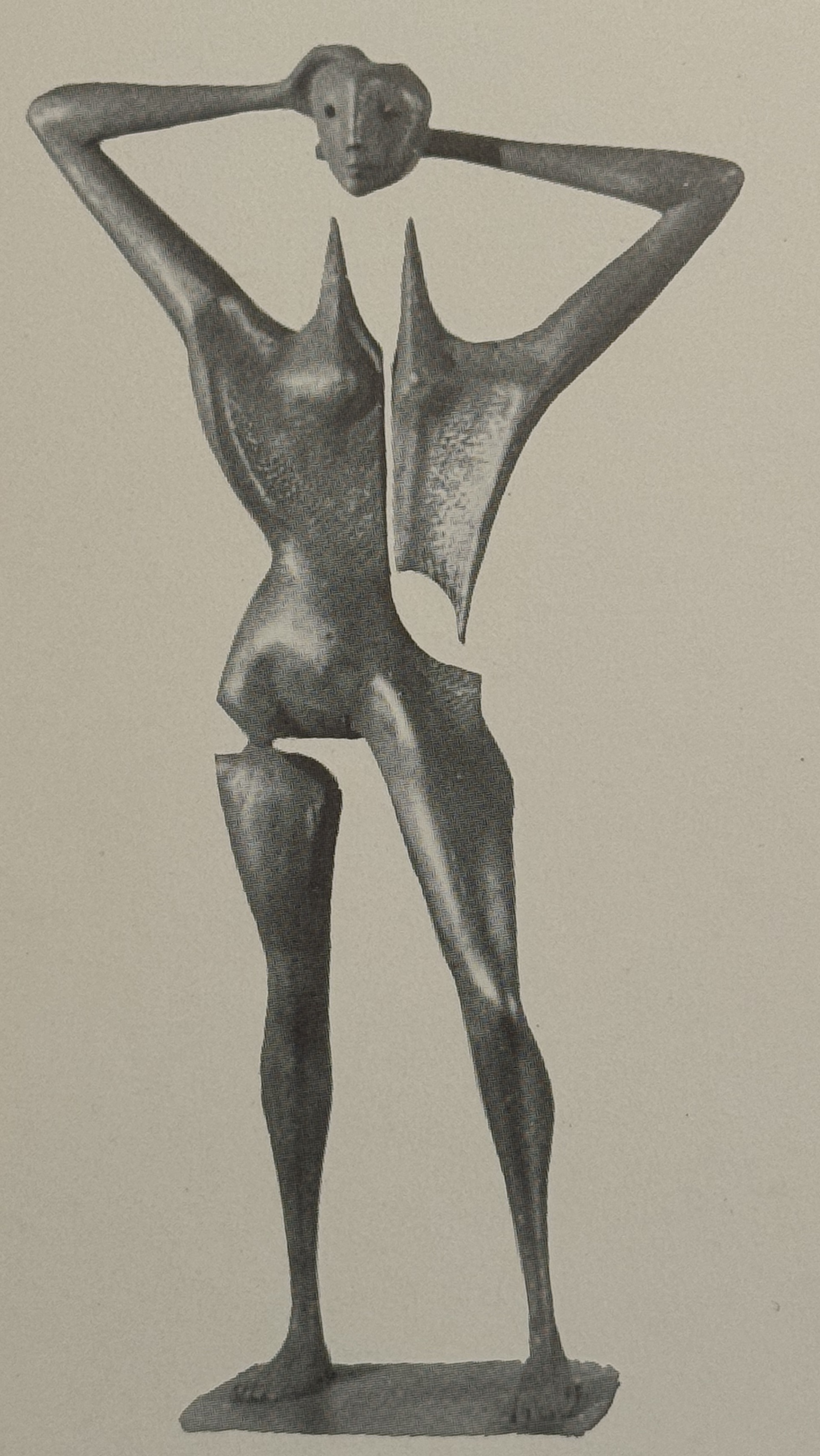
Eulalia, bronze, 112 cm, 1975

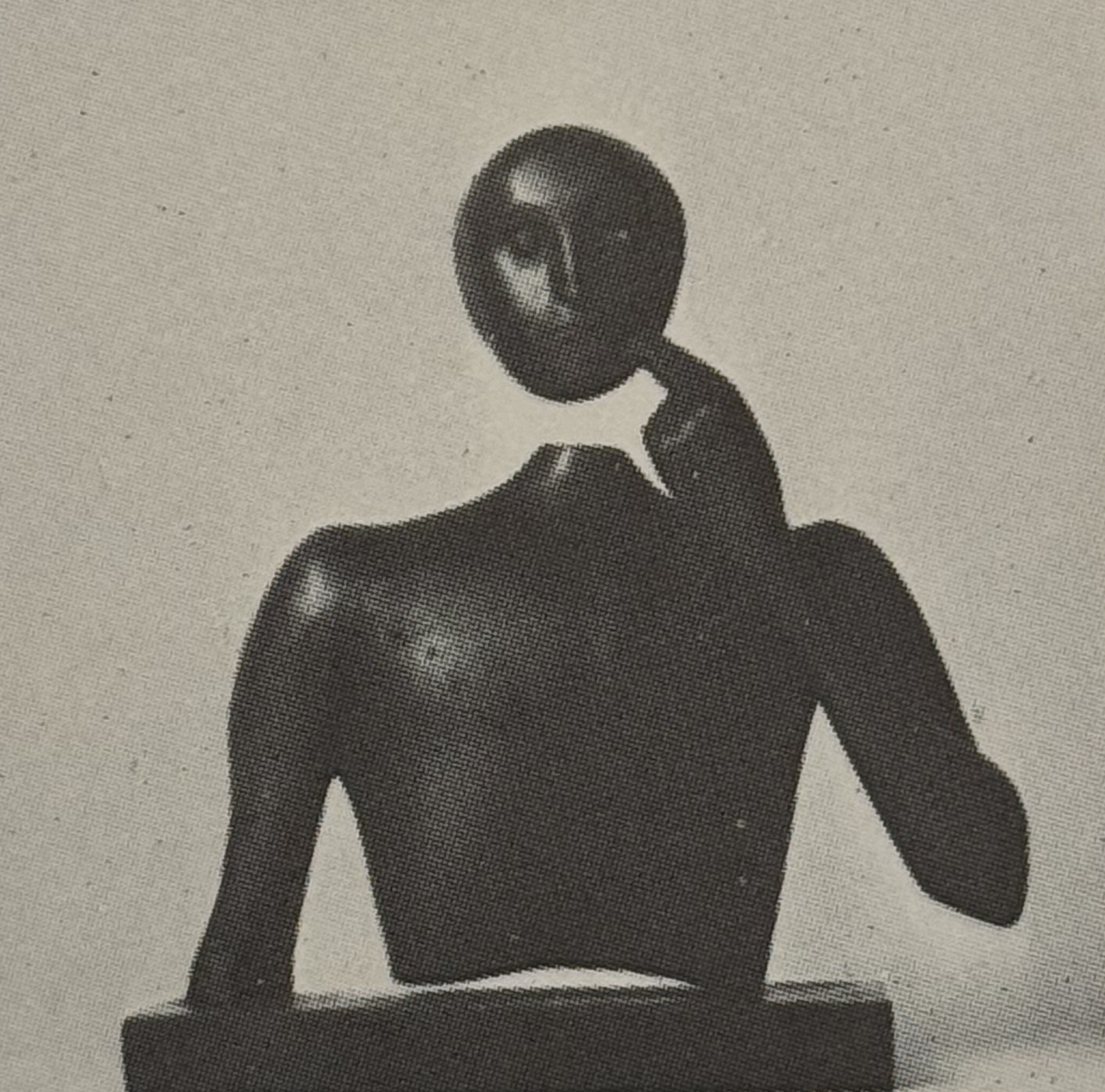
Observador, bronze, 40 cm, 1975
