= David Childs (academic) =

British academic and political historian

David Childs FRSA
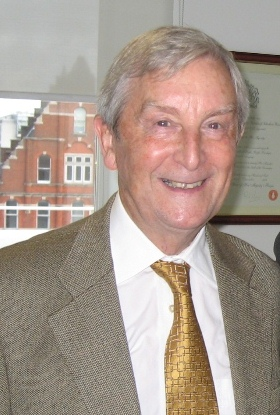
- David Childs at a meeting with Lord Triesmann

Personal details
- Born: 25 September 1933 Bolton, Lancashire, England
- Died: 21 March 2025 (aged 91) West Bridgford, Nottingham, England
- Spouse: Monir Pishdar
- Children: 2
- Education: London School of Economics
- Profession: Emeritus Professor of Politics, University of Nottingham
- Website: davidchilds.co.uk

David Haslam Childs FRSA (born September 1933) is a British academic and political historian, who is Professor Emeritus of Politics at the University of Nottingham. His life-long interest and research, which made him one of the UK's foremost experts on the GDR, chiefly concerned modern Germany and the field of German studies. His considerable contribution also played a vital role in helping academics, ambassadors, business leaders, government ministers, the armed services, students and the public develop a better understanding of the history and politics of both former East and West Germany.

== Family and Education ==
David was born in Bolton, Lancashire, the son of John Arthur Childs, (1899-1965) a police officer, who went on to become Mayor of Bolton (1962–63), and Ellen Childs (née Haslam, 1899-1984). He had a sister, Margaret, who lived in Bolton her whole life before moving to Brighton due to ill-health; she passed away in April 2025. He was educated at Thornleigh Salesian College and the Wigan & District Mining & Technical College in Lancashire. Unsure of what to do after his A Levels, David was encouraged by his headmaster to apply for university. Upon receiving his results, his mother told him to go to London rather than Manchester; he was the first on either side of the family to attend university. He graduated from the London School of Economics in 1956 before spending a year at the University of Hamburg on a British Council scholarship. He completed his PhD at the University of London in 1962 whilst working part-time as a journalist for Associated Television.

David died peacefully at home in Nottingham after a short illness with cancer. He is survived by his wife, a photographer, whom he married in 1963, and eldest son; his youngest son predeceased him.

== Career ==
David's anti-communist views had been developed by works such as George Orwell's Nineteen Eighty-Four and Arthur Koestler's Darkness At Noon, as well as his early visits to Germany. The first was in 1951, to the communist-organized Festival of Youth And Students in East Berlin. He travelled again to East Berlin just after the rising of June 1953 when the Soviet Army was used to crush the workers' revolt.

After completing his PhD, he turned to academic work and was appointed as a lecturer at the University of Nottingham in 1966. He was promoted to Senior Lecturer, and then reader in 1976. By this time, he was well known for his books on Germany and for his book Marx and the Marxists – An Outline of Practice and Theory.

In 1983, David was appointed as chairman of the Association for the Study of German Politics and conceived the idea for an Institute of German, Austrian and Swiss Affairs at the University of Nottingham that focused on politics and society rather than language and literature. It was established in 1985 with the help of John H. Gunn, a businessman and graduate of the university. The institute's purpose-built centre was opened by then-Prime Minister Margaret Thatcher in 1989, hosting conferences on themes such as the Austrian resistance to National Socialism, and ethnic Germans in the Soviet Union. In 1990, controversy arose as speakers from all of the new East German political parties and the Communist SED argued at a conference in the University's great hall about the future of East Germany.

German reunification, in October 1990, coincided with the start of the fall of the institute. John Gunn had presided over the collapse of British & Commonwealth, one of the largest city businesses, and could no longer fund the Institute. The slump made it difficult to find alternative supporters. David, promoted to professor in 1989, came under great pressure from those who had long disapproved of his line on Germany and Communism, and from professional rivals, who were jealous of his worldwide notoriety. He was forced to step down from the directorship of the Institute in late 1992, and took early retirement from the University two years later. He continued to serve as a member of the committee of the British-German Association until 1997.

David's former students include politicians Neil Carmichael and Kelvin Hopkins, and Owain Blackwell, Head of Law at Bolton University.

== The Fall of the German Democratic Republic ==
David was one of the very few who predicted the collapse of the Berlin Wall and of the East German Republic in 1989, concluding after several visits that it was not sustainable. He made such a prediction at a conference at the University of Dundee in 1981. As Professor Marianne Howarth later found in the East German archives, a secret report on this was duly sent back to East Berlin.

The Stasi attempted to monitor his activities not only on visits to East Germany but also in Britain. His appearance at a conference in Bradford in 1983 was again duly recorded in the Stasi archives. He was put on a Stasi Fahndung [investigation] list and denounced in DDR publications as a 'British imperialist East researcher'. David later discovered the file that the Stasi had on him which covered a seven-year period. The file revealed that he had, in fact, been spied upon by two British spies, who were two British academics. It also revealed that he was regarded by the East German secret police as one of their most serious opponents in Britain. Despite numerous offers, David never disclosed the identities of those who spied against him.

David delivered the same 'Dundee' analysis at the German Historical Institute in London, 24 November 1987, and elsewhere. He predicted early German reunification and outlined a plan in an interview with journalist Peter Johnson on the West German radio Deutschlandfunk in April 1988, but faced ridicule in reaction in some quarters. When he later spoke at the 'Pacific Workshop On German Affairs: The Two Germanies at Forty' about the likely collapse of the DDR, he again met with strong opposition and ridicule. However, the organiser, Professor Christian Soe, invited him back, after German reunification, in 1991, writing, 'We are happy that David Childs, who in April 1989 took a minority position in clearly diagnosing the moribund condition of the East German system, returns to give us a post mortem ...' In an article written the day before the opening of the Berlin Wall, and published in the Yorkshire Evening Post, 9 November 1989, David again predicted full German reunification and welcomed it. The following day The Guardian wrote, 'It would mean that a dangerous situation in the heart of Europe has been liquidated ...'

== British political history, later works and diplomatic missions ==
David worked with both the Foreign Office and Home Office, as well as several commercial organisations. He was a guest speaker on contemporary German themes in universities across Europe and the United States of America. In 2011, he was invited to talk at the Italian-German Historical Institute, based in Trento, Italy, at a conference on International and multidisciplinary perspectives 20 years after the collapse of communism.

Although a long-standing member of the European Movement, and a strong supporter of the European Union, David was known as the author of numerous works on Britain rather than Germany, despite over 10 books on Germany, notably his 1979 work Britain Since 1945: A Political History, which has had many revisions over the years.

David's most recent and last publication differs from his more usual academic publications as it was a novel, entitled We Were No Heroes. It is about Martin Thomas, an Englishman who fought for the Waffen SS on the Eastern Front, survived a Soviet concentration camp, worked as a Stasi agent during the Cold War and witnessed the fall of the Berlin Wall. David based the semi-fictional account on a man he had met in Leipzig in 1989.

David also wrote for the national broadsheets, magazines and journals. Over 275 of his obituaries have been published in The Independent and The Guardian from 1988 to 2022.

In September 2013, David was, once again, among a number of international observers following the German Federal Elections, German federal election, 2013. They travelled across Germany monitoring the various parties and witnessed Angela Merkel's famous third term as German Chancellor.

In October 2023, David starting writing a brief memoir of his life and experiences from childhood and World War II to his adventures behind the Iron Curtain and post-1989 Germany, which were published by Central Bylines.

== Membership ==
- Founder member of the Association for the Study of German Politics since 1974; member of the executive, 1981–91; Chair, 1981–86; Secretary, 1986–88; founder/editor of journal, 1988–92
- Member of British-German Association, member of executive 1987–97
- Member of the European Movement
- Member of Nottingham University Committee, 1994-8
- Elected Fellow of Royal Society of Arts 1990
- Director of the Institute of German, Austrian and Swiss Affairs at the University of Nottingham, 1985–92

=== Order of Merit ===
On 4 March 2013, David was awarded the Order of Merit of the Federal Republic of Germany (Verdienstorden der Bundesrepublik Deutschland), Germany's highest honour, in recognition of his 50 years of outstanding, pioneering academic work, particularly on the GDR, and his practical work in the field of reconciliation and friendship between Germany and the United Kingdom. The Cross of the German Order of Merit was presented at the German Embassy by the German Ambassador, on behalf of the German President, Joachim Gauck.

== Books ==
Sole author:

- The Fall of the GDR: Germany's Road To Unity, Longman, 2001. ISBN 978-0-582-31569-3.
- The GDR: Moscow's German Ally, (Second Edition 1988, First Edition 1983, George Allen & Unwin, London) ISBN 978-0-04-354029-9.
- The Fall of the GDR, Longman, 2001. ISBN 0-582-31569-7.
- The Two Red Flags: European Social Democracy & Soviet Communism Since 1945, Routledge, 2000. ISBN 978-0-41-522195-5
- Germany in the Twentieth Century, (From pre-1918 to the restoration of German unity), Batsford, Third edition, 1991. ISBN 0-7134-6795-9.
- East Germany to the 1990s Can It Resist Glasnost? The Economist Intelligence Unit, 1987. ISBN 978-0-85058-245-1.
- Germany Since 1918, (second edition 1980, first 1972, Batsford/Harper & Row). ISBN 0060107596
- Marx and the Marxists an Outline of Practice and Theory, Ernest Benn/Barnes & Noble, 1973. ISBN 978-0-51-026260-0
- East Germany, Ernest Benn/Praeger, 1969. ISBN 978-0-71-343673-0
- From Schumacher to Brandt: The Story of German Socialism Since 1945, Pergamon, 1966.
- Britain Since 1945: A Political History – Sixth Edition, Routledge, 2006. ISBN 0-415-39327-2.
- Britain since 1939: Progress and Decline, Macmillan, 1995, 2nd Edition, Palgrave Macmillan, 2001. ISBN 978-0-333-97165-9
- Britain Since 1945: A Political History – Seventh Edition, Routledge, 2012. ISBN 0415519519

Co-author/editor:

- The Changing Face of Western Communism, Edited By David Childs, Croom Helm, 1980. ISBN 0-85664-734-9, ISBN 07099-0281-6
- West Germany: Politics And Society, David H. Childs and Jeffrey Johnson, Croom Helm, 1982. ISBN 0-7099-0702-8.
- Honecker's Germany, Edited By David Childs, Allen & Unwin, 1985. ISBN 0-04-354031-7
- East Germany in Comparative Perspective, Thomas A. Baylis, David H. Childs and Marilyn Rueschemeyer, eds., Routledge, 1989.
- Children In War: Reminiscences of the Second World War, Edited by David Childs and Janet Wharton, 1989. ISBN 1-85041-030-5
- The Stasi: East German Intelligence and Security Service, David H. Childs & Richard Popplewell, Palgrave Macmillan, 1996, Revised paperback edition 1999. ISBN 978-0333772072

Most recent conference publications:

- "British Views on the German Economy and the Germans, 1949–1964" in Franz Bosbach, John R. Davis, Andreas Fahrmeir (Hg.), Industrieentwicklung: Ein deutsch-britischer Dialog, Prinz-Albert Studien, Band 27, Munich, 2009.
- "Schwierigkeiten und Möglichkeiten der britischen DDR-Forschung vor 1990" in Peter Barker, Marc Dietrich Ohse, Dennis Tate (Hg.), Views from Abroad Die DDR aus britischer Perspektive, Bielefeld, 2007.
- ‘Un paese sconosciuto, La DDR vista dalla Gran Bretagna’ (Ein unbekanntes Land: Die DDR aus britischer Sicht) – An Unknown Country: The GDR from a British Perspective, edited by Magda Martini & Thomas Schaarschmidt, (Reflections on the DDR / GDR), Bologna, 2011.
- Intelligence Gathering in Cold War Germany, Journal of Contemporary History, (Volume 48, Number 3, pp. 617–624), Sage Publications, London, July 2013.
