= Embassy of Spain, London =

Diplomatic mission of Spain in the United Kingdom

Embassy of Spain in London
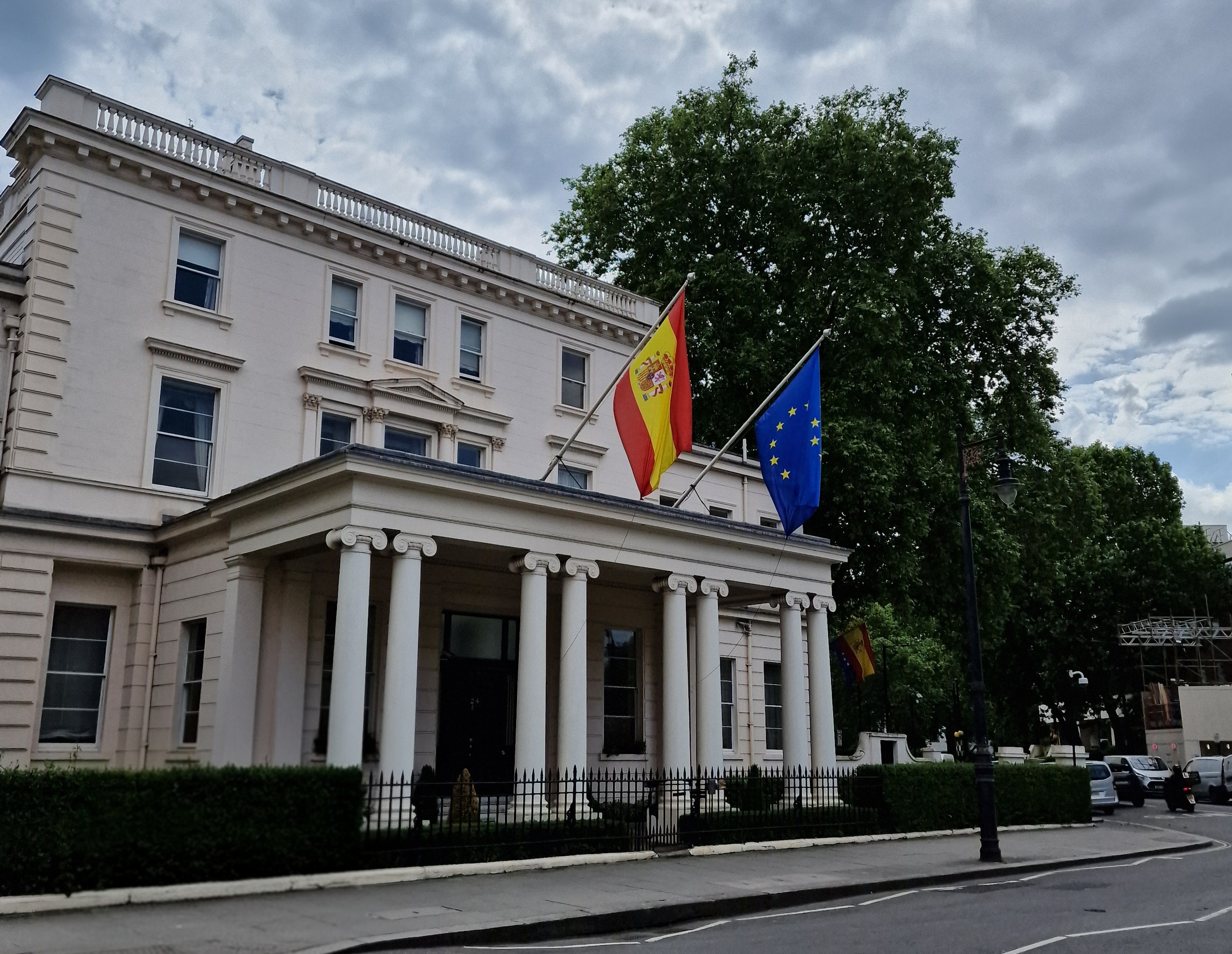
- Location: Belgravia, London, UK
- Address: 24 Belgrave Square; London, SW1
- Coordinates: 51°29′51.7″N 0°9′14.7″W
- Ambassador: José Pascual Marco Martínez

The Embassy of Spain in London is the diplomatic mission of Spain in the United Kingdom. Formerly known as Downshire House, the embassy is located at 24 Belgrave Square in the Belgravia area of London. Spain also maintains a Consulate General at 20 Draycott Place in Chelsea, a Defence Office at 3 Hans Crescent in Knightsbridge, an Education, Employment & Social Affairs Office at 20 Peel Street in Holland Park, and an Economic & Commercial Section at 66 Chiltern Street in Marylebone.

The embassy is situated in a detached, stucco house designed by Henry E. Kendall and built between 1840 and 1850 on Belgrave Square in Belgravia. The building is Grade I listed for its architectural merit.

== History ==
In the reign of Elizabeth I, the Bishops of Ely let their palace and chapel in Ely Place to the Spanish Ambassador and, until the reign of Charles I, it was occupied by the High Representative of the Court of Spain. During this period, the chapel (now St Etheldreda's Church) was freely used by English Roman Catholics.

After the restoration of Charles II, the Spanish Embassy was re-established in London, first on Ormond Street and then at Hertford House on Manchester Square, where the Wallace Collection is now housed. Here, in 1793–96, shortly after the Roman Catholic Relief Act 1791 repealed some of the laws affecting Catholic worship, a chapel, St James's, Spanish Place, was built to designs by Joseph Bonomi on the corner of Spanish Place and Charles Street (now George Street), Westminster, largely through the efforts of Thomas Hussey, chaplain at the embassy. In 1827, the official Spanish connection with the chapel ceased.

=== Current location (Downshire House) ===
Downshire House's first tenant was the MP Thomas Read Kemp, who financed the construction, which was part of a redevelopment of the Belgravia area in the early 19th century.

From 1898, Downshire House was rented by Lord Pirrie, the director of Harland & Wolff, a prominent Belfast shipbuilding company. During a meeting in the house with White Star Line managing director J. Bruce Ismay in 1907, the first plans for the Olympic-class ocean liners are said to have been conceived. In the dining room there is a table which was built for Titanic but remained in the house.

Pirrie died in 1924 and the building became the Spanish Embassy four years later in 1928. A refurbishment was then carried out and adjacent premises were acquired for administrative offices.

== Gallery ==
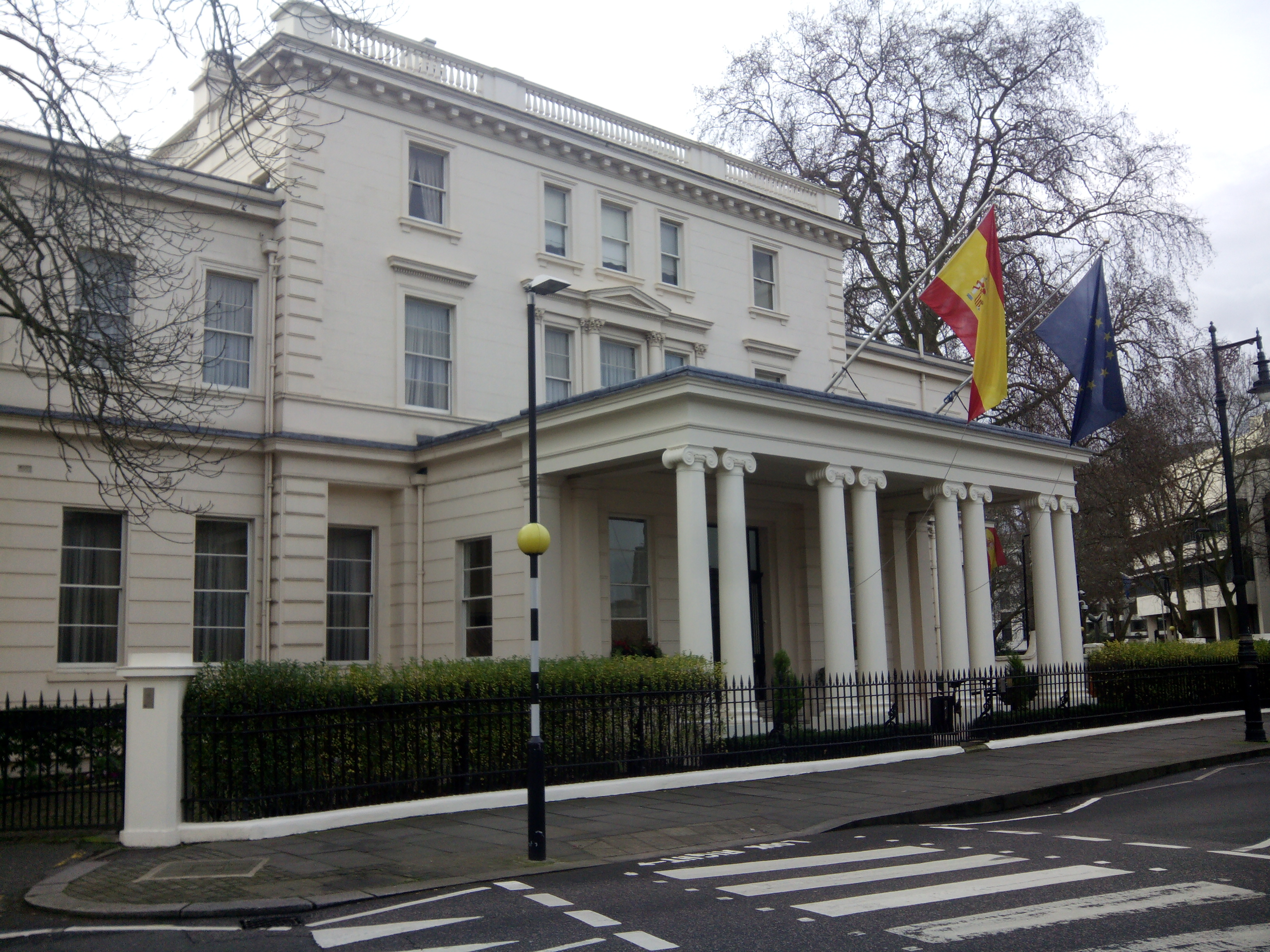
Entrance on Belgrave Square with the Spanish and EU flags

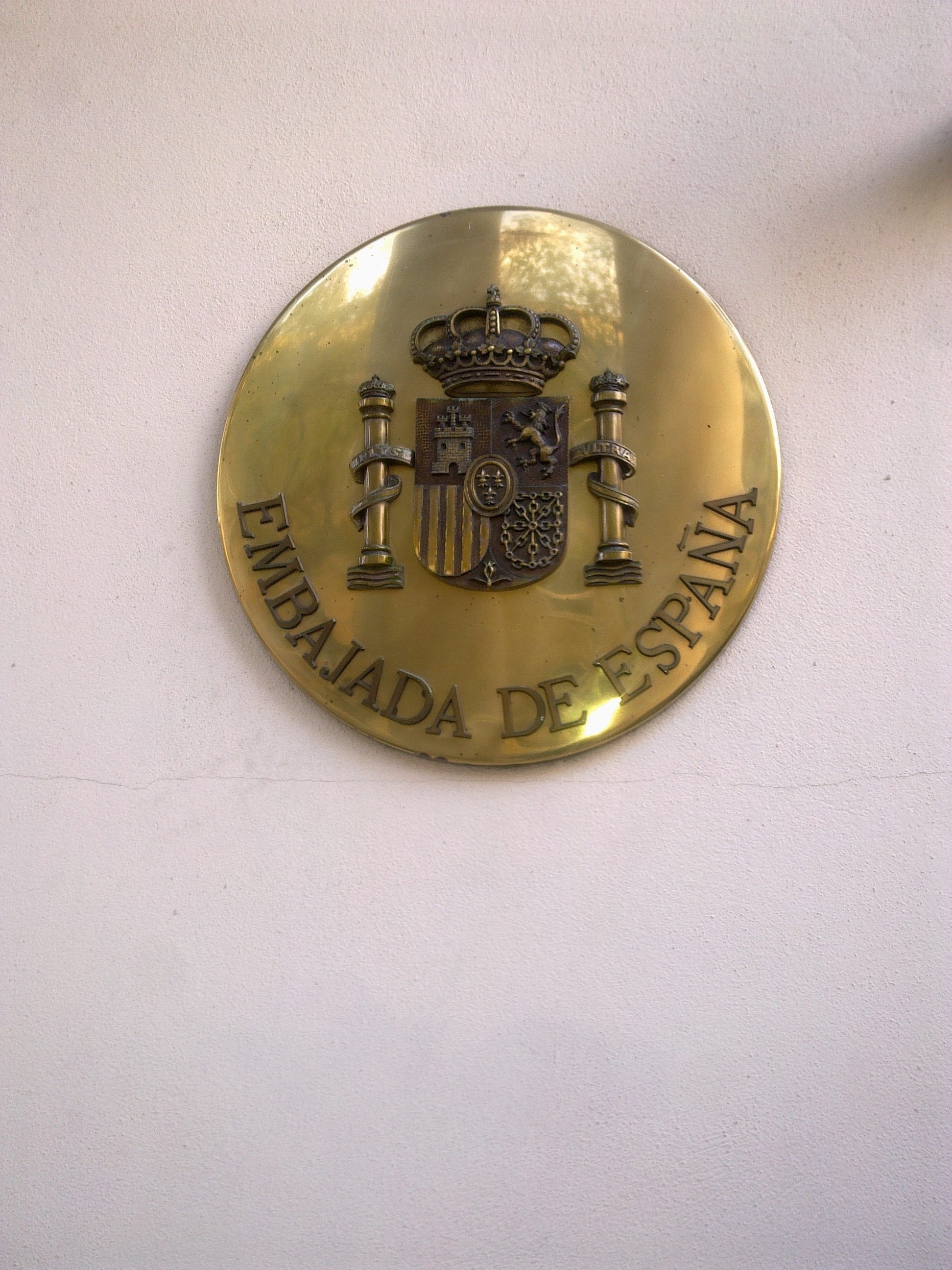
Plaque outside the embassy depicting the coat of arms of Spain

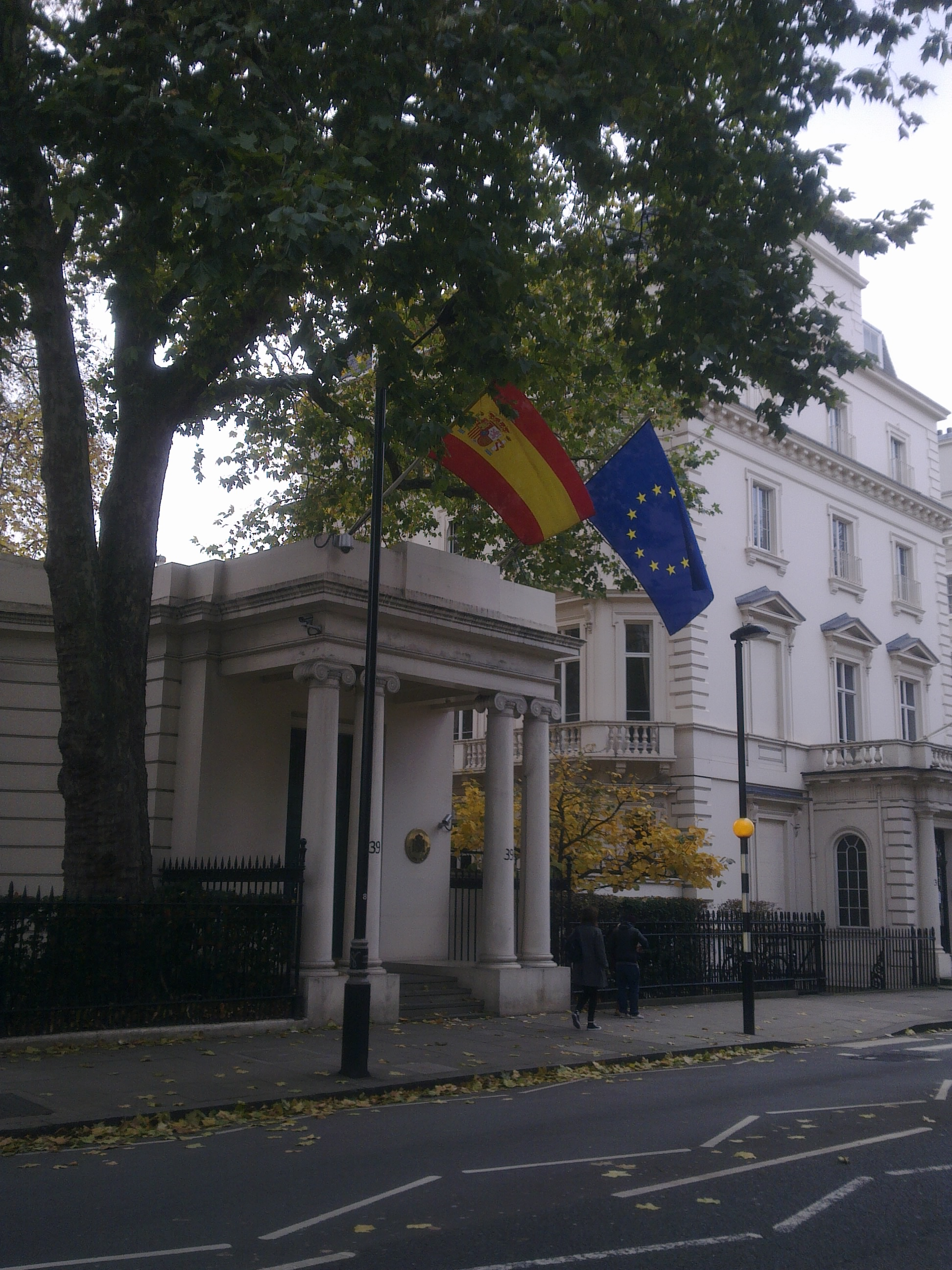
Entrance on Chesham Place

== See also ==
- Category:Ambassadors of Spain to the Kingdom of England
- Category:Ambassadors of Spain to the United Kingdom
