= High Commission of Trinidad and Tobago, London =

High Commission of Trinidad and Tobago in London
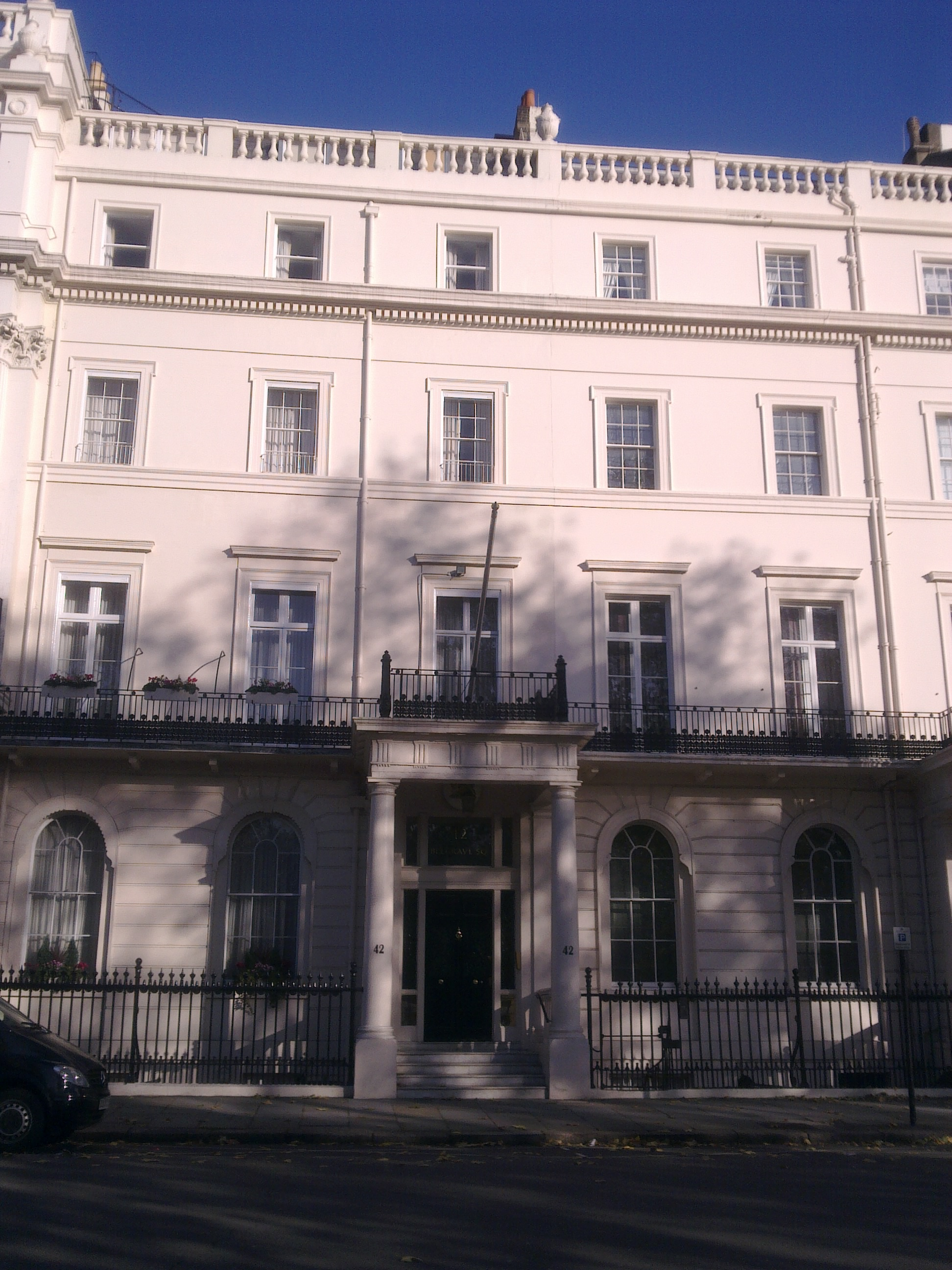
- Address: Belgrave Square; London, SW1
- Coordinates: 51°29′59.1″N 0°9′7.9″W
- High Commissioner: Orville London

The High Commission of Trinidad and Tobago in London is the diplomatic mission of Trinidad and Tobago in the United Kingdom. It is on Belgrave Square, in one of a group of Grade I listed buildings at Nos. 38–48.

The building can be seen in the 1956 film Around the World in 80 Days, where it used as the residence of Phileas Fogg (played by David Niven).

== Gallery ==
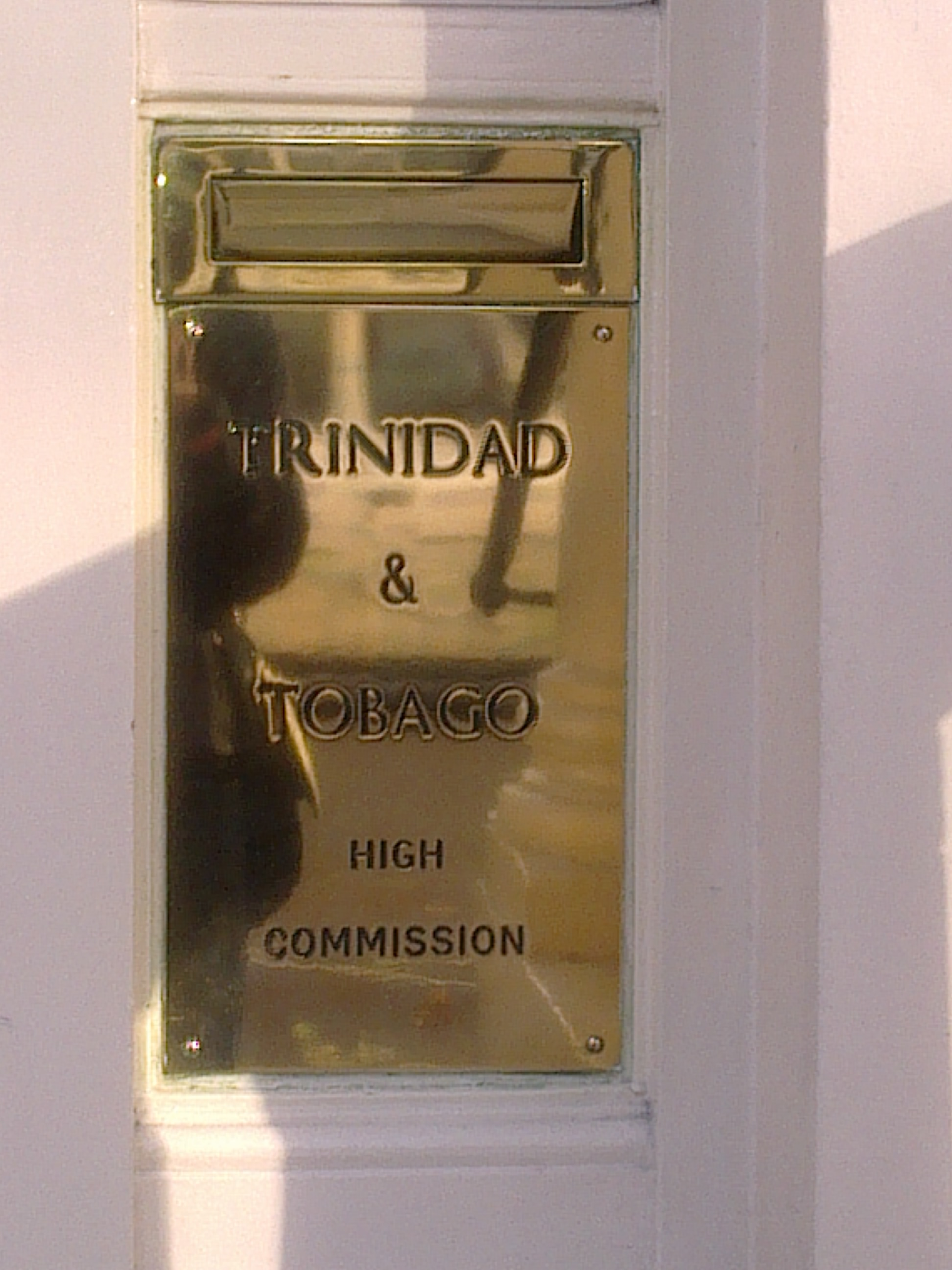
Plaque outside the High Commission
