= Statue of Simón Bolívar, London =

1974 statue by Hugo Daini

Statue of Simón Bolívar
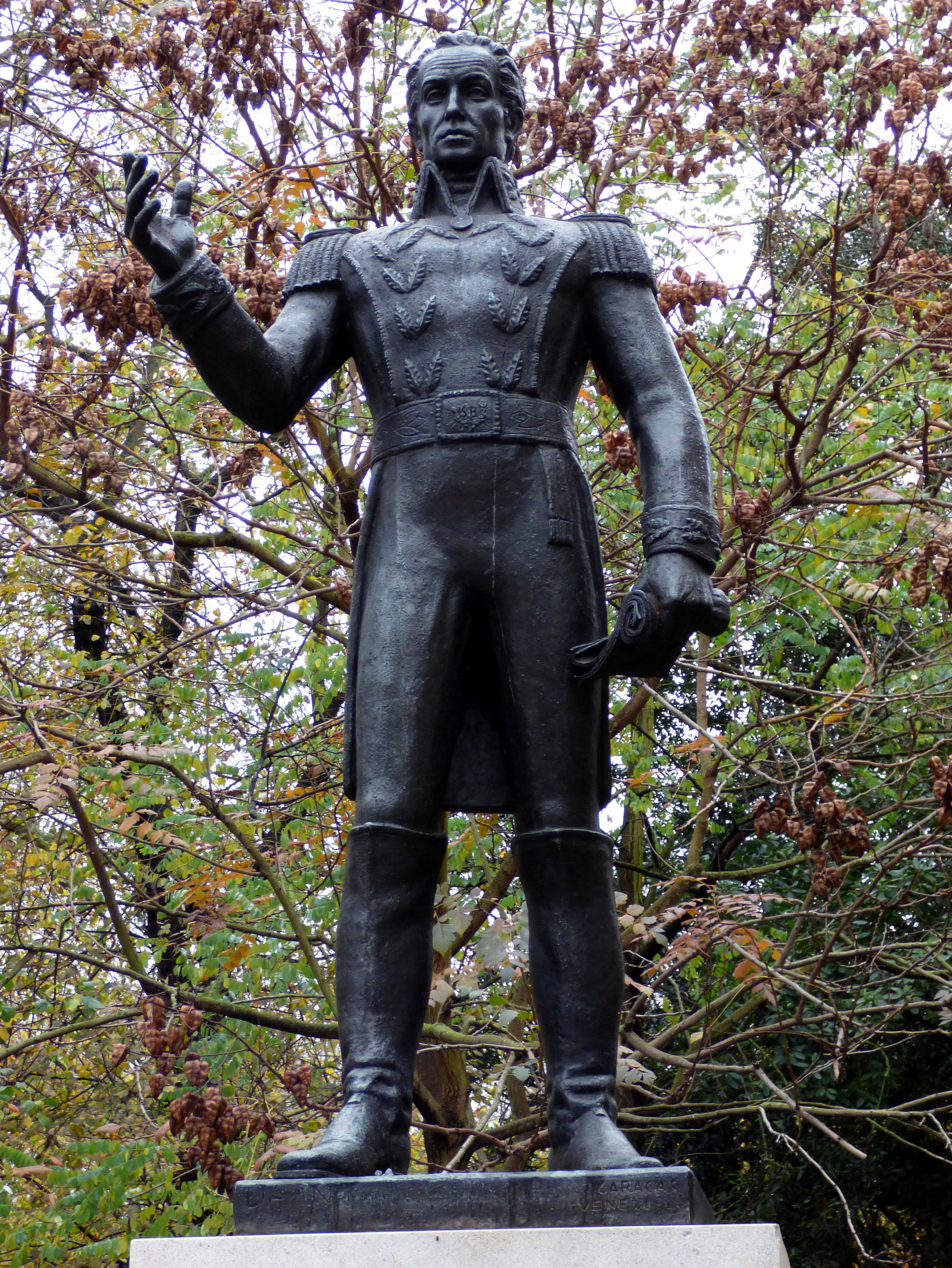
- The sculpture in 2017
- Artist: Hugo Daini
- Year: 1974
- Medium: Bronze
- Subject: Simón Bolívar
- Location: Belgrave Square; London; 51.499202°N 0.152326°W

An outdoor bronze sculpture depicting Venezuelan military and political leader Simón Bolívar (1783–1830), by Hugo Daini, is located at the south-east corner of Belgrave Square in London, United Kingdom. The statue was unveiled by James Callaghan, then Secretary of State for Foreign and Commonwealth Affairs, later Prime Minister of the United Kingdom, in 1974.

On the plinth are the words:

I am convinced that England alone is capable of protecting the world's rights as she is great, glorious and wise

The names of countries liberated by Bolívar are inscribed on the base.

== See also ==
- Equestrian statue of Simón Bolívar (Washington, D.C.)
- List of public art in Belgravia
