= Statue of Christopher Columbus, London =

Statue in Belgrave Square, London

Statue of Christopher Columbus
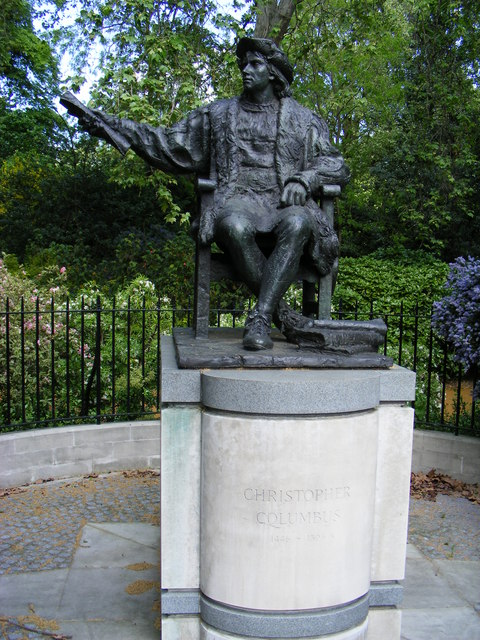
- The statue in 2009
- Artist: Tomás Bañuelos
- Year: 1992
- Medium: Bronze
- Subject: Christopher Columbus
- Location: Belgrave Square; London; 51.4985°N 0.1535°W

A statue of Christopher Columbus stands at the southern corner of Belgrave Square in London. It was designed in 1992 by the sculptor Tomás Bañuelos, as a gift from Spain. It was erected by a committee of Canning House to mark the 500th anniversary of Columbus's first voyage to the Americas.

In 2021, the statue was the target of vandalism during the George Floyd protests regarding controversy surrounding Columbus's relationship with slavery. It followed a petition to remove the statue for the alleged crimes committed by Columbus.
