= Belgrave Square =

Square in London, England

Coordinates: 51.4992°N 0.1534°W

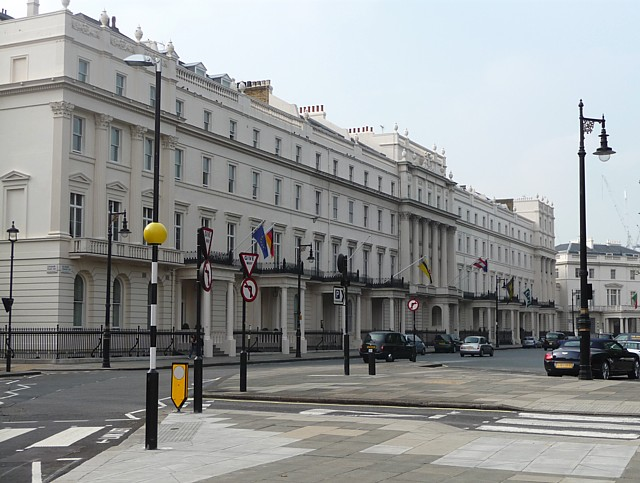
Typical buildings in Belgrave Square

Belgrave Square is a large 19th-century garden square in London. It is the centrepiece of Belgravia, and its architecture resembles the original scheme of property contractor Thomas Cubitt who engaged George Basevi for all of the terraces for the 2nd Earl Grosvenor, later the 1st Marquess of Westminster, in the 1820s. Most of the houses were occupied by 1840. The square takes its name from one of the Duke of Westminster's subsidiary titles, Viscount Belgrave. The village and former manor house of Belgrave, Cheshire, were among the rural landholdings associated with the main home and gardens of the senior branch of the family, Eaton Hall. Today, many embassies occupy buildings on all four sides.

== History ==
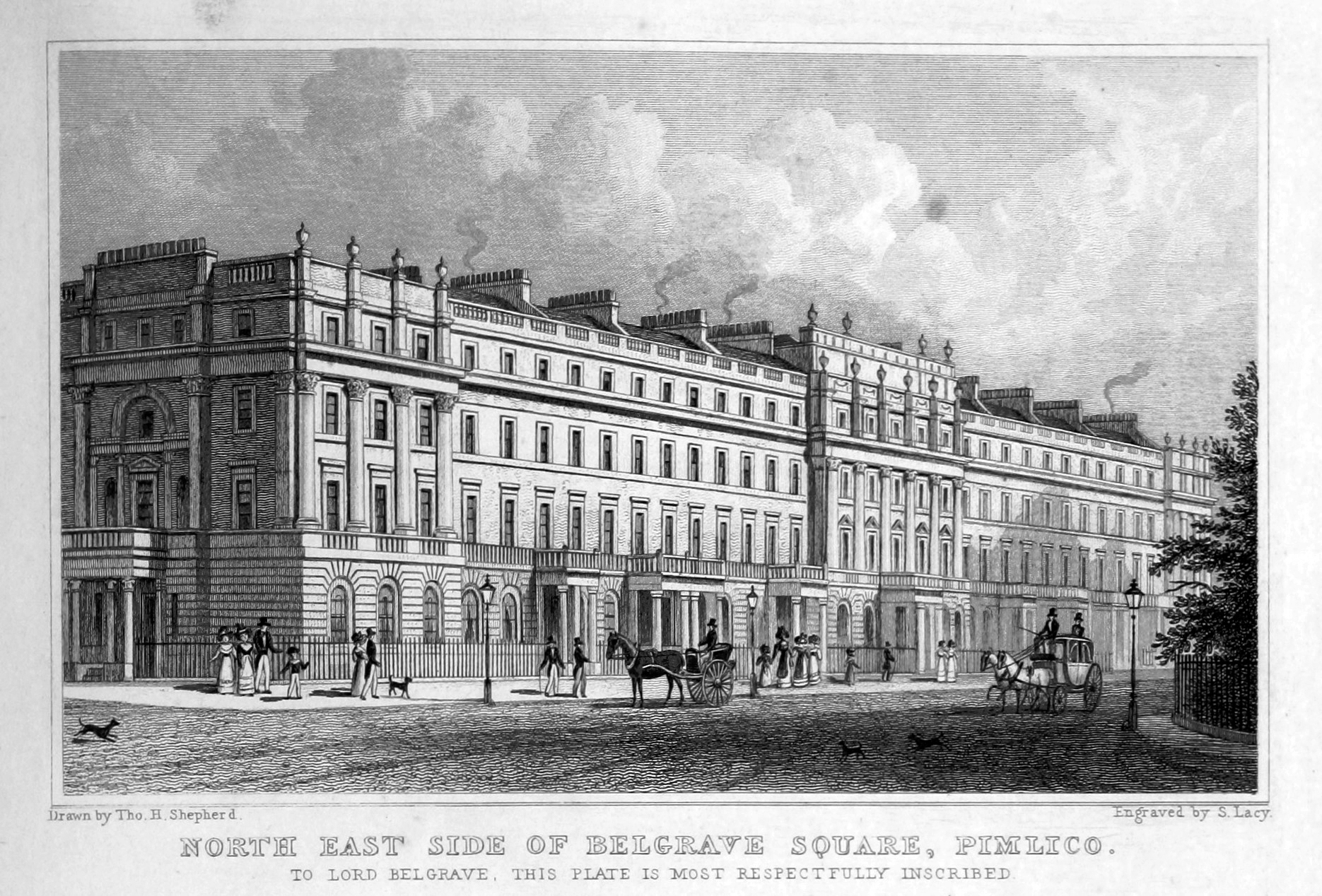
The north-east side of Belgrave Square, soon after construction

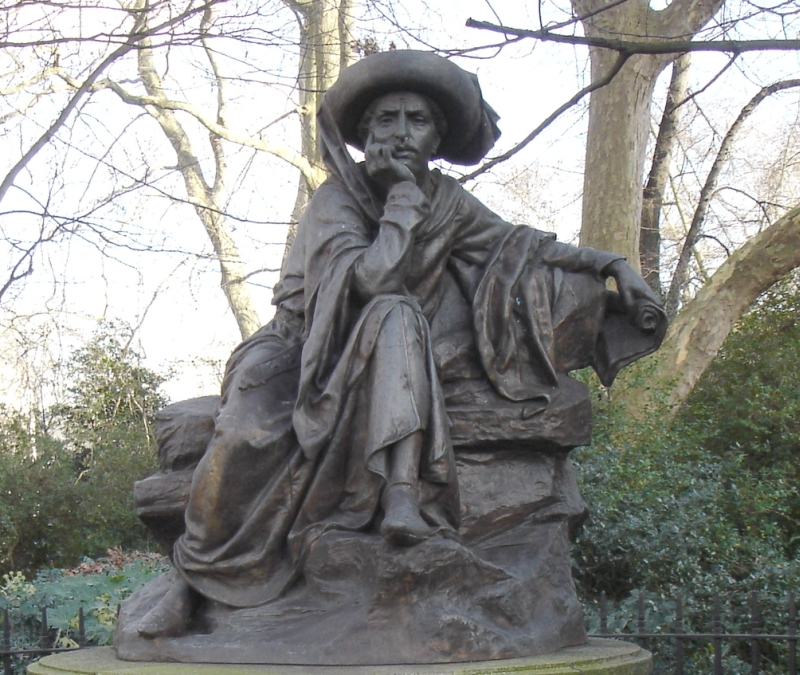
Statue of Prince Henry the Navigator in Belgrave Square, erected in 2002

The square is perfectly 650 feet (200 m) across, inclusive of small porch projections. The square is surrounded by four terraces, three of eleven houses and the fourth (south-east) of twelve. These houses are all white stucco except for the cream-coloured projecting corner houses. In addition there are detached mansion houses in three of the corners, and a private central garden.

Numbering is anticlockwise from the north: NW terrace, No.s1 to 11; west corner mansion, No.12; SW terrace, No.s13 to 23; south corner mansion, No.24; SE terrace. No.s25 to 36; east corner mansion, No.37; NE terrace No.s38 to 48. The slightly later north corner mansion No.49 was drawn up by Cubitt (not to be confused with his son George, another architect, ennobled as Lord Ashcombe) for Sidney Herbert in 1851.

The terraces were designed by George Basevi. The largest corner mansion, No.37 (Seaford House), was designed by Philip Hardwick. No.12 was designed by Robert Smirke. The square features statues of Christopher Columbus, Simón Bolívar, José de San Martín, Prince Henry the Navigator and the 1st Marquess of Westminster, a bust of George Basevi, and a sculpture entitled Homage to Leonardo by Italian sculptor Enzo Plazzotta.

From its construction until the Second World War the square saw building rentals and longer leases by the upper echelons of capitalists seeking further influence, status or socialising in the capital. Such success was immediate. This was encapsulated by the decision of another of London's leading freeholders and estate planners, the Duke of Bedford, to choose No.6 as London accommodation rather than any house on his own Bloomsbury estate, which had lost its aristocratic cachet.

The square has included embassies since its first century, including the German Embassy, which occupies three houses on the west side. During the Second World War the square was used as a tank park; most of the houses were afterwards converted into offices for charities and institutes. The 21st century has seen more domestic leases granted, such as three by the Grosvenor Estate in 2004.

== Listed status ==
=== Grade I ===
The buildings on the square are listed. In this highest category are:

- the Spanish Embassy, formerly Downshire House, at No.24,
- No.s1–11
- No.12
- No.s13–23
- No.s25–36
- No.s38–48 are listed Grade I.

=== Grade II* ===
- No.49
- No.37 (Seaford House)
- Railings and gate piers of No.s12, 24 and 49.

=== Grade II ===
- No.11a is listed Grade II.

== Individual properties ==
1 Belgrave Square was the official residence of the ambassadors of Romania from 1936 to 2005. The building has continued to host events for the Embassy since 2006, and is also headquarters of the Romanian Cultural Institute in London.

2 Belgrave Square was first leased (c. 1829) to James Goding, whose Lion Brewery on the south bank of the River Thames was denoted by the iconic South Bank Lion and Twickenham Stadium Lion. Later residents included James Hamilton, 2nd Duke of Abercorn, Edward Balfour and Nathaniel Clayton. In the 20th century, the house was purchased by the British soldier and politician Ernest George Pretyman and his wife, Lady Beatrice, daughter of George Bridgeman, 4th Earl of Bradford. In 1935, after Pretyman's death, it was sold to Grace, Lady Dance. On 12 May 1953, it was reopened by the Duke of Gloucester as the base of the Hispanic and Luso-Brazilian Council, which remained until it moved to 14-15 Belgrave Square in 2013. Since 2021, it has become the residence to Lalit Modi the former chairman of the Indian Premier League.

3 Belgrave Square was the London home of the Duke of Kent; in 1935, it was the birthplace of the current Duke, and in the following year that of Princess Alexandra. The House previously served as the London Residence of the Barons de Ramsey during the 1880's to 1920's.

4 Belgrave Square was the home of Admiral of the Fleet Sir Charles Ogle.

5 Belgrave Square was the home of Sir George Murray, Secretary of State for War and the Colonies, until he died there in 1846; Chips Channon from 1935 to 1958; and later housed the Institute of Directors, followed by the British Plastics Federation.

6 Belgrave Square was by September 1840 leased by the 7th Duke of Bedford, Francis Russell.

10 Belgrave Square was the London home of William Cavendish, 7th Duke of Devonshire.

11 Belgrave Square serves as the Embassy of Portugal.

12 Belgrave Square was the home of Gilbert Heathcote-Drummond-Willoughby, 1st Earl of Ancaster.

13 Belgrave Square was the home of William Lygon, 7th Earl Beauchamp. It was also used by the St John Ambulance Brigade as a base during the First World War. It served as the first NATO headquarters, established in 1949, before moving location to Paris in 1952. It is now the Ghana High Commission.

16 Belgrave Square was the home for many years of geographer and geologist Sir Roderick Impey Murchison and his wife, geologist Charlotte Murchison; it was later home to Charles Henry Crompton-Roberts.

17 Belgrave Square was the base of the Royal College of Psychiatrists until the college relocated in October 2013, and was home to two MPs, Sir Ralph Howard and Pandeli Ralli. Leontine, Lady Sassoon was in residence from 1929 to 1952. She is said to have held parties for soldiers during the Second World War, while part of the property was used as a Red Cross supply depot. No.17 was taken over by the Institute of Metals in 1956; the college arrived in 1974.

18 Belgrave Square has been the home of the Austrian Embassy since 1866. It is the only building of those used by the Austro-Hungarian Empire's Foreign Service that is still used today by diplomats of the Republic of Austria. Between 1846 and 1851, it was inhabited by Sir Francis Egerton (born Leveson-Gower), the 1st Earl of Ellesmere, and his family. Owing to the rebuilding of Cleveland House in St. James's, which would be renamed Bridgewater House, the Earl was also forced to house his famed "Bridgewater Collection of Pictures" here, using bedrooms, dining rooms, hallways, etc. The collection reopened to the public once it moved back to Bridgewater House in 1851.

19–20 Belgrave Square houses the Bruneian High Commission. Previously, No. 20 was the London home of the 9th Baron Barnard.

21–23 Belgrave Square has been the Embassy of the Federal Republic of Germany since 1955. The buildings were leased for 99 years in 1953, and converted into a combined property.

24 Belgrave Square is now the Embassy of Spain. In the early part of the 20th century, it was known as Downshire House and was the London residence of Lord and Lady Pirrie. Lord Pirrie was the chairman of Harland & Wolff, a leading shipbuilding firm located in Belfast, Ireland. One evening in July 1907, the Pirries hosted J. Bruce Ismay and his wife Florence for dinner. Ismay was the managing director of White Star Line, one of the main shipping lines of the North Atlantic. Harland and Wolff constructed all of White Star's vessels, with their main rival being Cunard Line. Cunard's newest vessel, the Lusitania, the largest ship in the world, was just two months before entering service. Pirrie and Ismay discussed the new ships during the dinner, and how to respond to their competition. Their discussions led to the original propositions behind the construction of the newest and the then largest class of ocean liner in the world. The names of these new ocean liners would be RMS Olympic, RMS Titanic and HMHS Britannic.

25 Belgrave Square has been the Embassy of Norway since 1949.

28 Belgrave Square was the home of Robert Carew, 3rd Baron Carew, who died there on 29 April 1923. It is now the home of the Embassy of the Republic of Serbia.

29 Belgrave Square is where Sir Winston Churchill received his first cabinet appointment in 1906, from the Prime Minister at that time, Sir Henry Campbell-Bannerman.

31 Belgrave Square was the home of the Royal Automobile Club Motor Sports Association and the Speedway Control Board.

32 Belgrave Square was an overseas residence of Heidi Horten.

33 Belgrave Square was home to the banker Maurice Ruffer, and later to the Spiritualist Association of Great Britain.

34 Belgrave Square served as the embassy of the German Democratic Republic until German reunification in 1990. It currently houses the British-German Association.

36 Belgrave Square, known as Ingestre House, was leased by Queen Victoria as a home for her mother, the widowed Duchess of Kent.

37 Belgrave Square, now known as Seaford House, was built in 1842 by Philip Hardwick for the Earl of Sefton. In 1902, the house was remodelled for Lord Howard de Walden (who was also Baron Seaford). It is now the home of the Royal College of Defence Studies.

38 Belgrave Square was the home of Bruce Wasserstein.

41 Belgrave Square was the London Residence of HRH Prince Arthur of Connaught and his wife Princess Alexandra, 2nd Duchess of Fife from c. 1920 until Prince Arthur's death in 1938. The House was later sold to Mrs Edward Baron in 1939, and later purchased as a residence for the Commissioner of the East Africa High Commission in 1952.

43 Belgrave Square has been the Embassy of Turkey since 1954. In the early part of the 20th century, it was the London home of the Earls of Harewood.

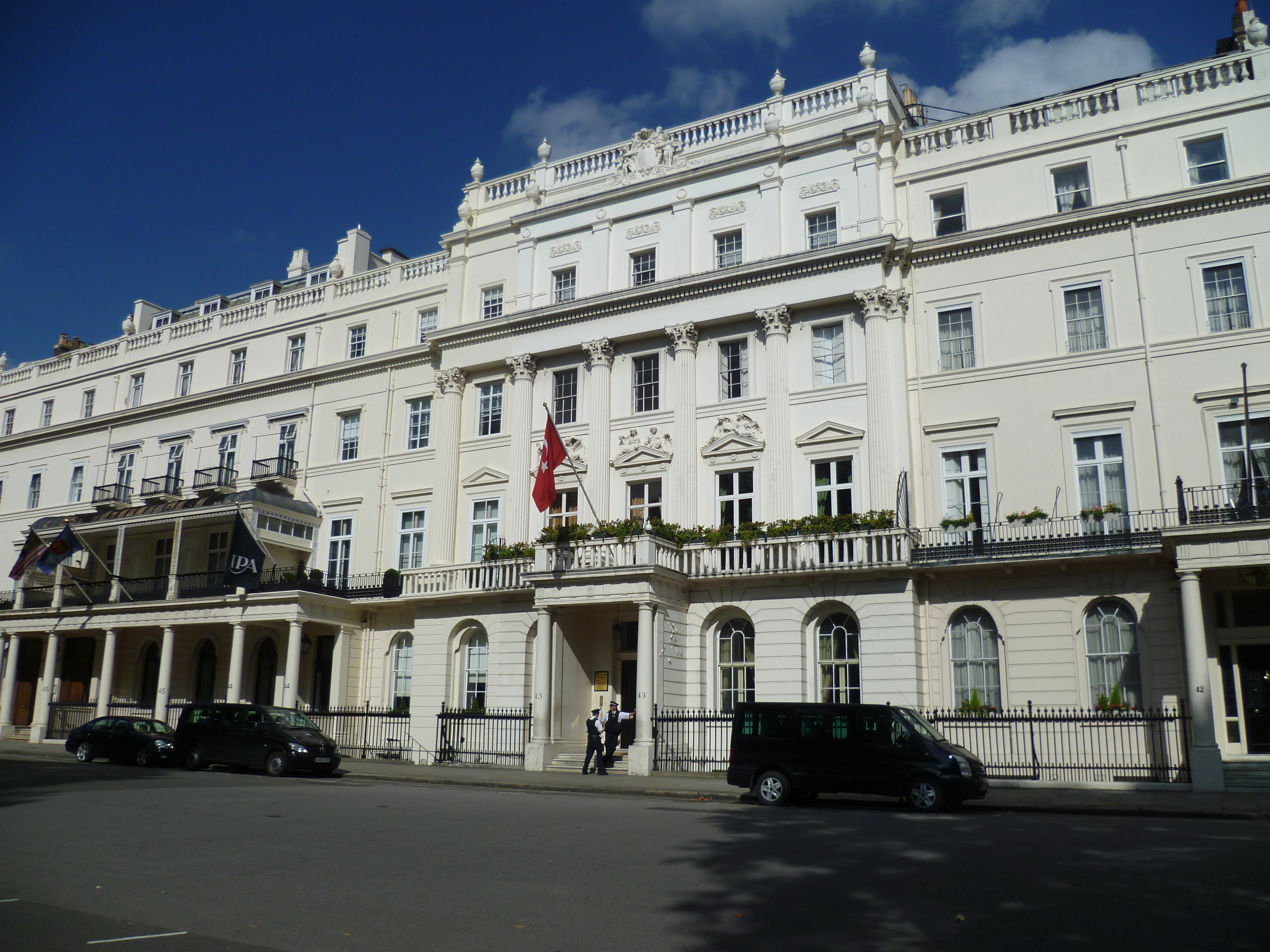
42–45 Belgrave Square

45 Belgrave Square was the home of Caroline Beresford, Duchess of Montrose (1818–1894), who used the pseudonym "Mr Manton", also of Sefton Lodge, Newmarket, a notable racehorse owner, a "wildly extravagant woman" who "strode across the racing scene". It is now the Malaysian High Commission. It featured in the 1954 film The Million Pound Note, as the spot where the actor Gregory Peck lost the note in the wind.

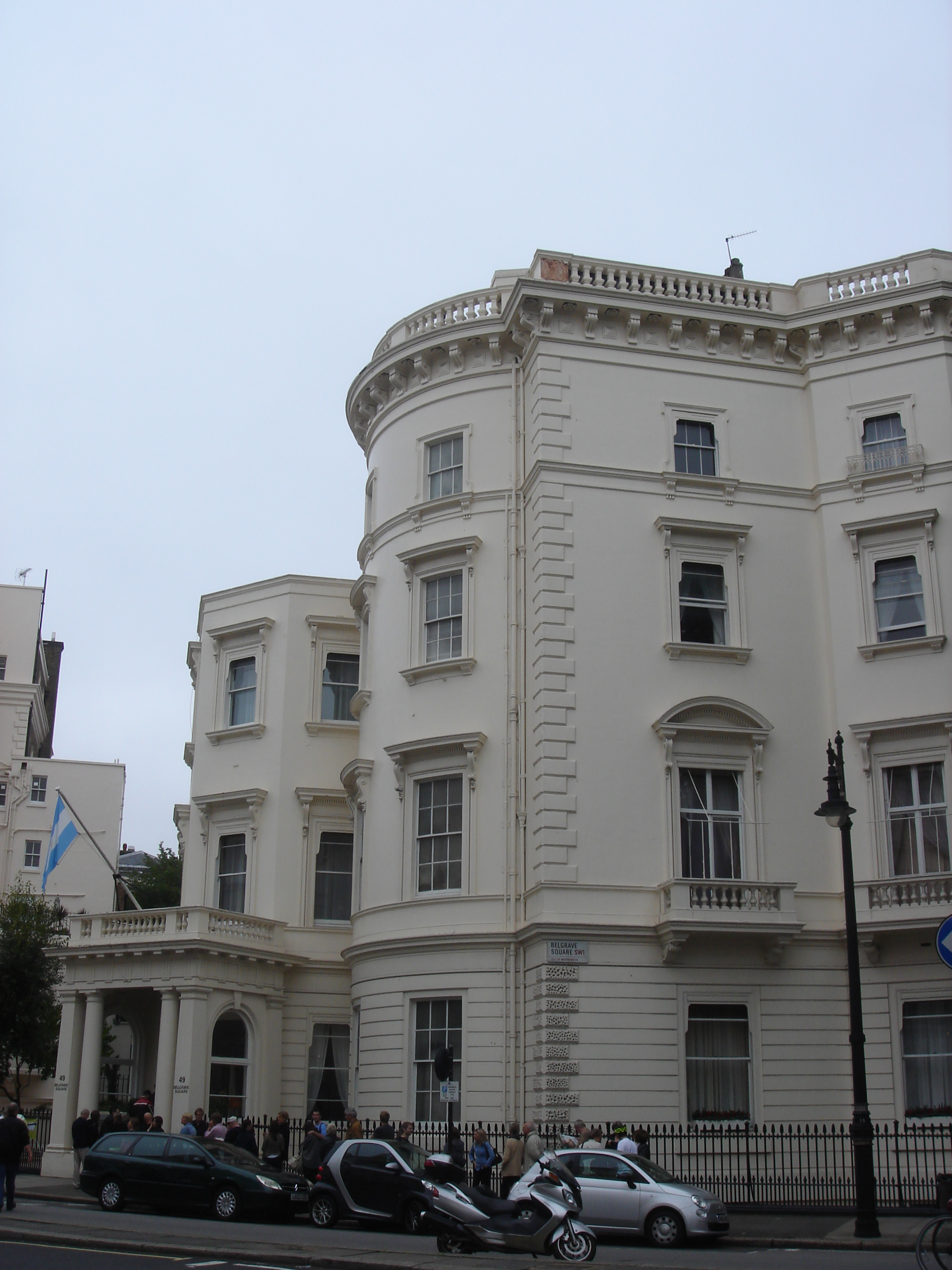
49 Belgrave Square

46 Belgrave Square was The Guide Club a private member's club which was owned by the Girl Guides Association and ran from 1948 to 1976.

48 Belgrave Square serves as the residence of the Mexican ambassador.

49 Belgrave Square, also known as Herbert House, was the home of Sidney Herbert, 1st Baron Herbert of Lea, and then Charles Gordon-Lennox, 6th Duke of Richmond. It is currently the residence of the Argentine ambassador.

== Gardens ==
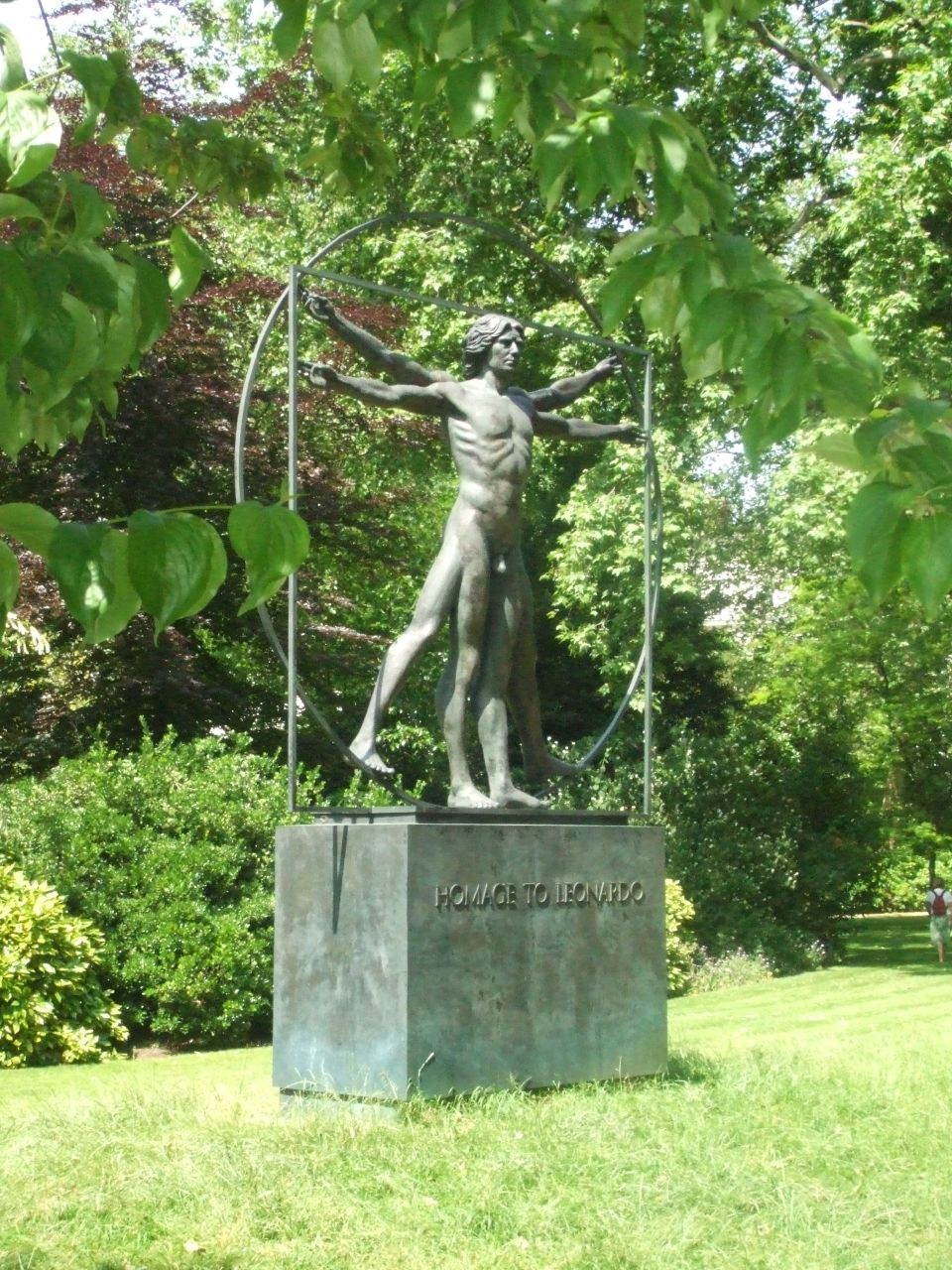
Homage to Leonardo

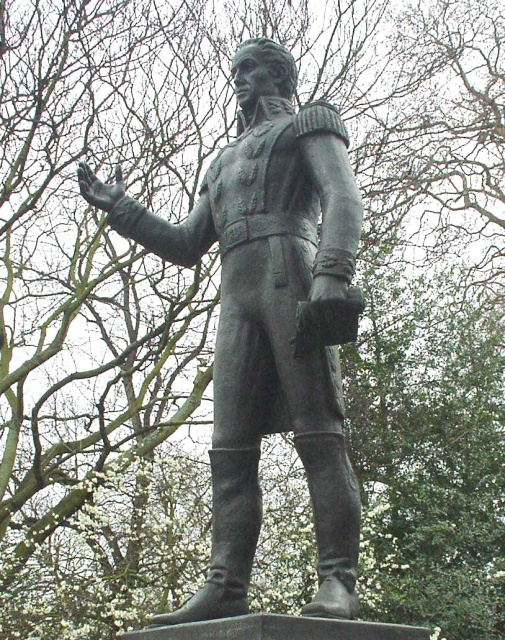
Statue of Simón Bolívar

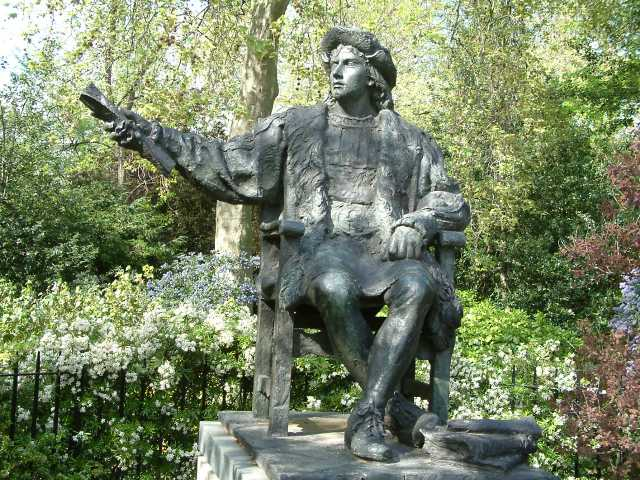
Statue of Christopher Columbus

The private communal garden is 2 hectares (4.9 acres) in size and contains mature plane, chestnut and lime trees, and various shrubs. Its gravel walks were laid in 1854, with privet hedges planted around its perimeter. Wooden pergolas and shelters stand within, and it features a tennis court. The garden is listed Grade II on the Register of Historic Parks and Gardens.

Sculptures in the gardens include Statue of Christopher Columbus, Statue of Prince Henry the Navigator, Statue of Simón Bolívar, Statue of José de San Martín, Homage to Leonardo, and a bust of George Basevi.

== 21st-century tenants ==
The square is primarily a centre for embassies and institutions.

- Romanian Cultural Institute section of the Embassy of Romania, at No.1
- Oleg Deripaska, at No.5
- The Embassy of Syria, at No.8
- The official residence of the ambassador of Kuwait, at No.11A
- The Embassy of Portugal, at No.s11-12
- The High Commission of Ghana, at No.13
- The Society of Chemical Industry, at No.s14–15
- Canning House, The Hispanic & Luso-Brazilian Council, at No.s14-15
- The Country Land and Business Association, at No.16
- The Official Residence of the Austrian Ambassador, at No.18
- The Bruneian High Commission, at No.s19–20
- The Embassy of Germany, at No.s(21)–23
- The Embassy of Spain, at No.24
- The Royal Norwegian Embassy, at No.25
- The Embassy of Serbia, at No.28
- The Saudi Cultural Bureau, at No.29
- The Embassy of Bahrain, at No.30
- Henadiy Boholyubov of Privat Group, at No.31
- The British-German Association, at No.34
- The Official Residence of the Belgian Ambassador, at No.36
- The Royal College of Defence Studies, Seaford House, at No.37
- Italian Cultural Institute at No.39
- The Trinidad and Tobago High Commission at No.42
- The Turkish Embassy at No.43
- The Institute of Practitioners in Advertising at No.44
- The Malaysian High Commission at No.45
- The Official Residence of the Mexican Ambassador at No.48
- Argentine Ambassador's Residence, at No.49

== Sources ==
- The Buildings of England, London 6: Westminster, by Simon Bradley and Nikolaus Pevsner, (2003), pages 739–41. ISBN 0-300-09595-3
- Georgian London, by John Summerson. 1988 edition. ISBN 0-7126-2095-8.
- Titanic Triumph and Tragedy by John P. Eaton and Charles A. Haas
- Titanic An Illustrated History, text by Don Lynch, paintings by Ken Marschall
