= Embassy of Norway, London =

Embassy of Norway in London, England

Embassy of Norway in London
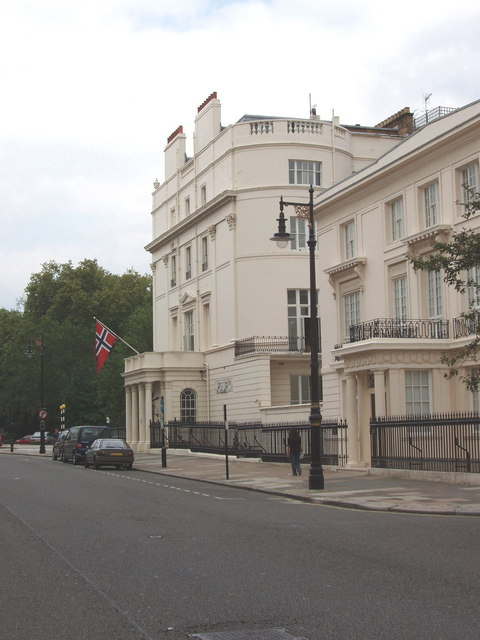
- Location: Belgravia
- Address: Belgrave Square; London, SW1
- Coordinates: 51°29′53.2″N 0°9′10.9″W
- Ambassador: Tore Hattrem

The Embassy of Norway in London at 25 Belgrave Square is the diplomatic mission of Norway in the United Kingdom. The embassy is located on Belgrave Square in a building it has occupied since 1949.

The embassy is situated in a c.1825 stucco terrace designed by George Basevi on Belgrave Square in Belgravia, Westminster, London. The building is part of a single group of Grade I listed buildings at 25—36 Belgrave Square.

The residence of the Ambassador is situated at 10 Palace Green.

== See also ==
- List of diplomats from Norway to the United Kingdom
- Norway-United Kingdom relations
