= British-German Association =

- Formation: 1951
- Type: Non-profit Organisation
- Headquarters: 34 Belgrave Square, London, SW1X 8QB, UK
- Key people: Peter Barnes, Chairman; The Duke of Kent, Royal Patron; Susanne Baumann, Patron; Andrew Mitchell, Patron
- Website: britishgermanassociation.org
- Formerly called: Anglo-German Society

The British-German Association (BGA) is a UK-registered charity and nonprofit membership organisation with its headquarters in London, UK. It is the civil-society hub for British-German relations in the UK. The BGA promotes mutual understanding and friendship between the UK and Germany, and aims to inform people in the UK about Germany, its culture and its language.

== Background ==
Founded in 1951, the BGA is currently chaired by Peter Barnes. The Duke of Kent serves as its Royal Patron. The other two Patrons are the German Ambassador to the UK, Susanne Baumann, and the British Ambassador to Germany, Andrew Mitchell. The BGA works closely with the Foreign, Commonwealth and Development Office (FCDO) and with the German Embassy in London.

== Role ==
The BGA’s work is focused on four areas of activity: Public Policy, Communities, Learning and Reach. The Head of Public Policy is James Harding.

The BGA seeks to support and work with other national, regional, and sectoral voluntary organisations involved with the UK and Germany. The BGA works closely with the Deutsch-Britische Gesellschaft, its sister organisation in Germany.

== Members ==
Membership of the BGA is open to any person who supports the BGA's charitable objectives. Membership is free to students and teachers of German.
