= Enzo Plazzotta =

Italian sculptor

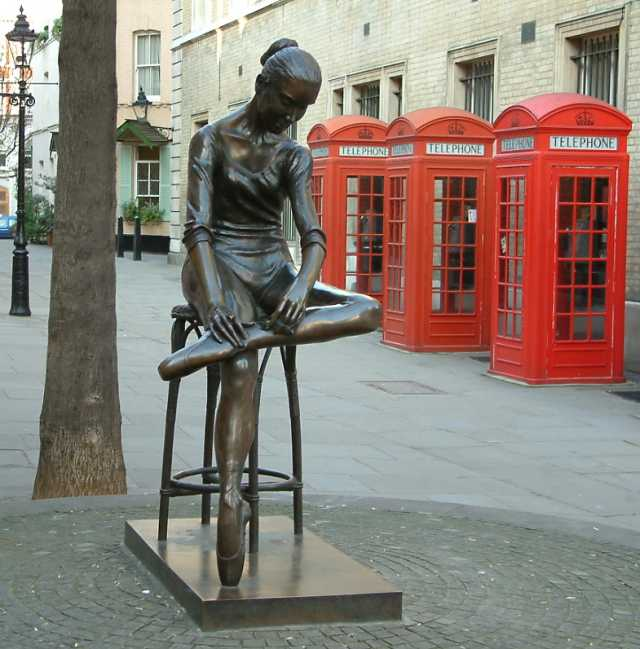
Young Dancer, a bronze opposite the Royal Opera House.

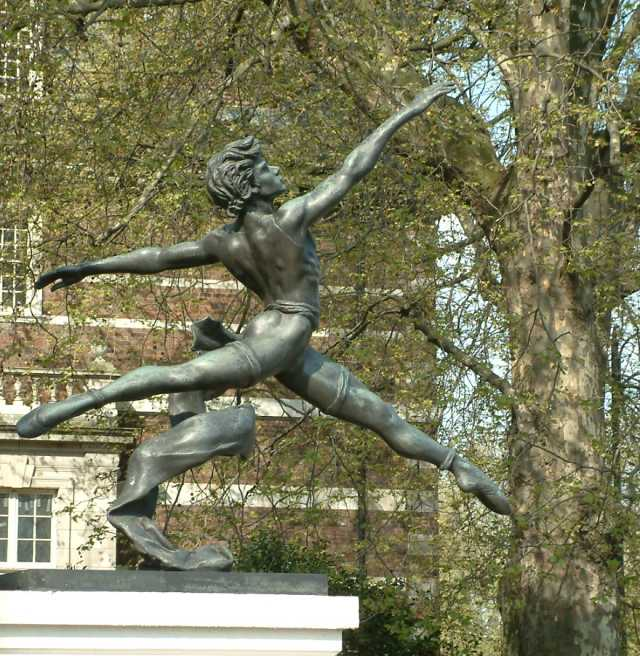
Jeté, a bronze on Millbank, Westminster, London.

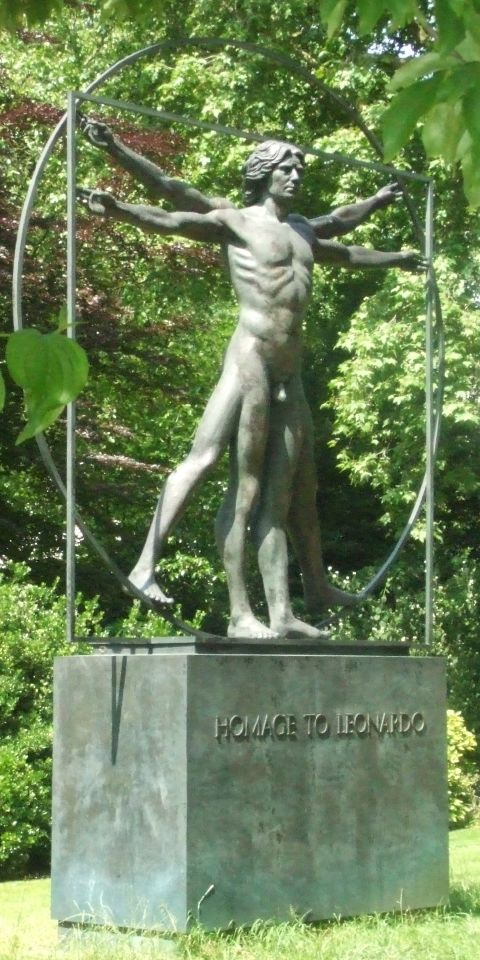
Sculpture Homage to Leonardo (The Vitruvian Man) 1982 in Belgrave Square, London

Enzo Plazzotta (29 May 1921 – 12 October 1981) was an Italian-born British sculptor.

Plazzotta was born in Mestre, near Venice, and spent his working life in London. He is best remembered for a fascination with and study of movement in bronze - the human form, horses, ballerinas, and for his female studies, many of which adorn London's streets. He died in London, aged 60.

== Works ==
Public works include:

- Camargue Horses stands on the Waterside Terrace at the Barbican Centre, London
- The Crucifixion in the College Gardens of Westminster Abbey.
- Homage to Leonardo stands in Belgrave Square, London.
- Jeté, 1975, on the corner of 46-57 Millbank, Westminster, London (based on David Wall).
- The Hand of Christ stands in front of Dinand Library at the College of the Holy Cross, Worcester, Massachusetts
- The Helmet,(1964) in front of Lewes Priory; commissioned by Sir Tufton Beamish
- Two Brothers - Boys Town, Nebraska.
- Young Dancer sits opposite the Royal Opera House in Broad Street, off Bow Street, London.
