= Statue of the 1st Marquess of Westminster, Belgravia =

Statue by Jonathan Wylder

Coordinates: 51.500386°N 0.153760°W

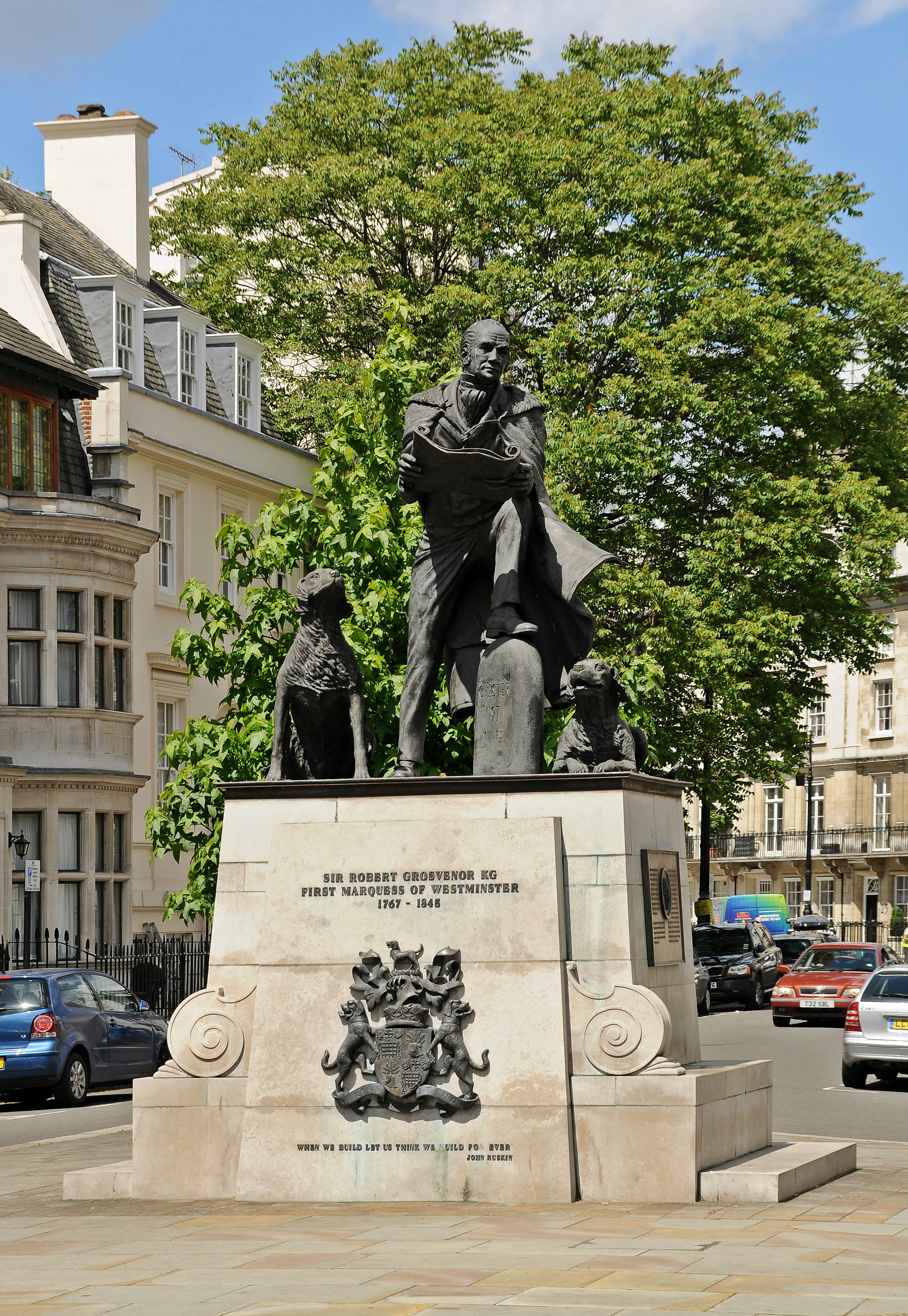
- The sculpture in 2012
- Artist: Jonathan Wylder
- Location: London, SW1 United Kingdom

The statue of the 1st Marquess of Westminster is an outdoor sculpture depicting the owner and developer of the surrounding Grosvenor estate, Robert Grosvenor, 1st Marquess of Westminster. The statue by Jonathan Wylder is located at the corner of Wilton and Grosvenor Crescents, Belgravia, London, England, and was commissioned by Gerald Grosvenor, 6th Duke of Westminster in 1998.

The design includes two Talbot dogs which are also featured on the Grosvenor family coat of arms. Below the family motto Virtus non stemma ('Valour not Garland') is a quote by John Ruskin:

When we build, let us think we build for ever.

== See also ==
- Statue of Richard Grosvenor, Second Marquess of Westminster
