= Homage to Leonardo =

Statue by Enzo Plazzotta

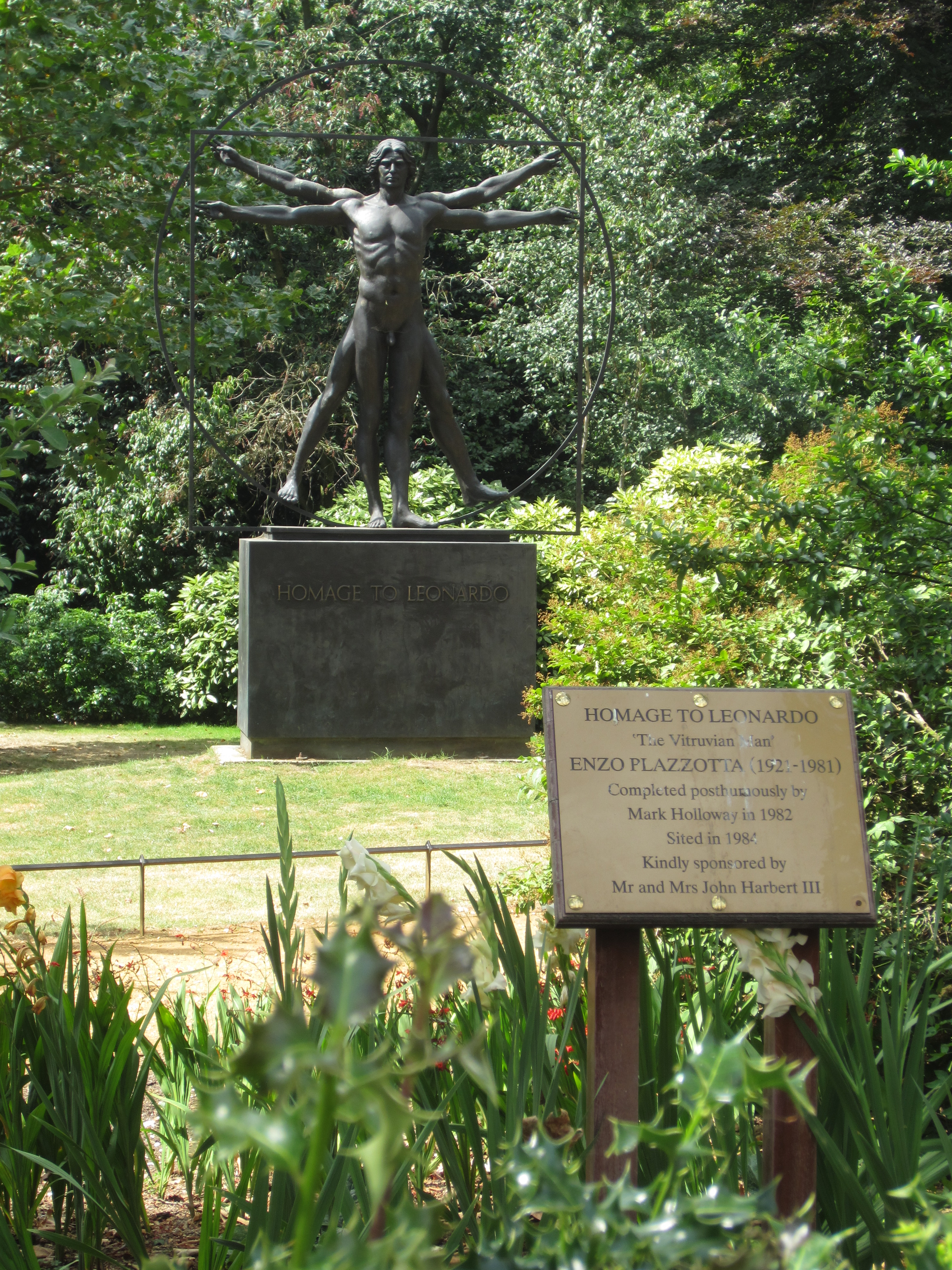
- The sculpture in 2014
- Artist: Enzo Plazzotta
- Year: 1984
- Type: Sculpture
- Subject: Vitruvian Man
- Location: London, United Kingdom; 51.4992°N 0.1534°W

Homage to Leonardo, sometimes referred to as Vitruvian Man for being a representation of the drawing of the same name by Leonardo da Vinci, is an outdoor statue by Italian sculptor Enzo Plazzotta, located at Belgrave Square in central London, United Kingdom. The statue was completed posthumously by Plazzotta's assistant Mark Holloway in 1982, and was installed in 1984.

== Description ==
An inscription on the front of the base reads: "Homage to Leonardo". The back of the base includes the inscription: "Homage to Leonardo / From the original conception by the Italian sculptor Enzo Plazzotta (1921 - 1981). Completed by his assistant Mark Holloway in 1982 and sponsored by Mr & Mrs John Harbert III. Birmingham, Alabama." A third inscription on a nearby plaque reads: "Homage to Leonardo ‘The Vitruvian Man’ / Enzo Plazzotta (1921 – 1981). / Completed posthumously by Mark Holloway in 1982. Sited in 1984. Kindly sponsored by Mr and Mrs John Harbert III."
