= Statue of José de San Martín, London =

1884 statue by Juan Carlos Ferraro

Statue of José de San Martín
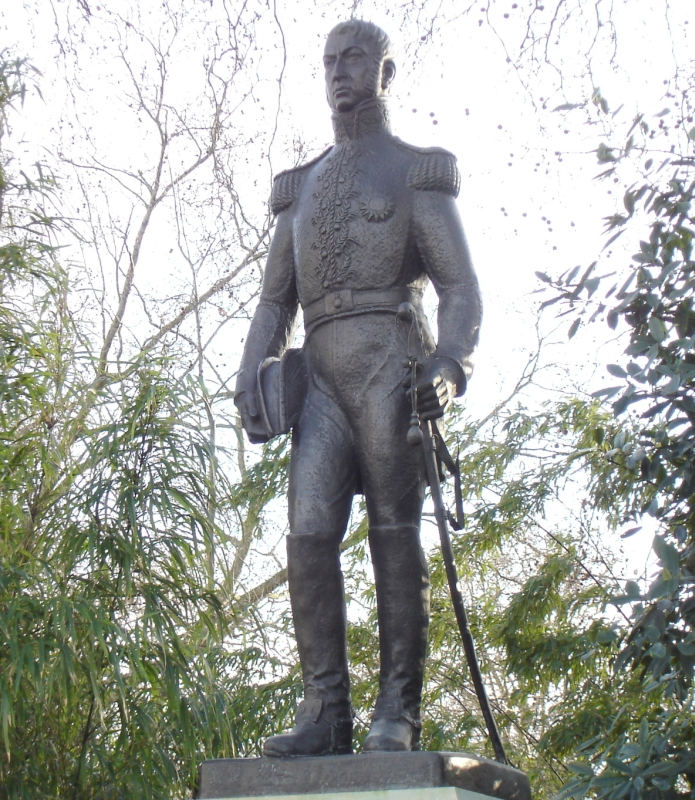
- The statue in 2008
- Artist: Juan Carlos Ferraro
- Medium: Bronze sculpture
- Subject: José de San Martín
- Location: 51.5000°N 0.1535°W

A bronze sculpture of Argentine general José de San Martín stands in Belgrave Square, London, United Kingdom. It was unveiled on 2 November 1994 by Prince Philip, Duke of Edinburgh accompanied by the Argentine Ambassador Mario Cámpora. The statue is the work of Argentinian sculptor Juan Carlos Ferraro.
