= Darwin for Beginners =

Book

- First hardback edition cover
- Author: Jonathan Miller
- Illustrator: Borin Van Loon
- Language: English
- Series: For Beginners; Introducing...
- Subject: Charles Darwin; Evolution
- Publisher: Writers & Readers; Pantheon Books; Icon Books
- Publication date: 1982
- Publication place: United Kingdom
- Media type: Print

Darwin for Beginners, republished as Introducing Darwin, is a 1982 graphic study guide to Charles Darwin and Evolution written by Dr. Jonathan Miller and illustrated by Borin Van Loon. The volume, according to the publisher's website, "unravels Darwin’s life and his contribution to biology, and traces the path from his scientific predecessors to the later modifications that his own evolutionary theories required."

== Publication history ==
This volume was originally published in the UK by Writers and Readers Publishing Cooperative in 1982, following the collapse of this organisation in 1984, in part due to a disagreement over the selling off of the US rights to this title, the book has subsequently been republished in the US by Pantheon Books and in the UK by Icon Books.

Work on the book proved difficult at times, according to illustrator Borin Van Loon, as the schedule of the author Jonathan Miller was, "always taken up with lighting Rigoletto at the Royal Opera House or making a television series on the human body.

Selected editions:

- Darwin for Beginners. Writers & Readers. 1982. ISBN 0906495962.
- Darwin for Beginners. Pantheon. 1990. ISBN 0679725113.
- Darwin for Beginners. Icon Books. 1992. ISBN 1874166013.
- Introducing Darwin and Evolution. Icon Books. 2000. ISBN 1840461535.
- Darwin for Beginners. Pantheon. 2003. ISBN 0375714588.
- Introducing Darwin. Icon Books. 2006. ISBN 1840467150.
- Introducing Darwin: A Graphic Guide. Icon Books. 2008. ISBN 978-1848311176.

Related volumes in the For Beginners... series:

- Rosenfield, Israel; Ziff, Edward; Van Loon, Borin (1983). DNA for Beginners. Readers & Writers.

Related volumes in the Introducing... series:

- Jones, Steve; Van Loon, Borin (1993). Genetics for Beginners. Icon Books. ISBN 1874166129.
- Evans, Dylan; Zárate, Oscar (1999). Introducing Evolutionary Psychology. Icon Books.
- Evans, Dylan; Selina, Howard (2001). Introducing Evolution. Icon Books. ISBN 1840462655.
- Ennis, Cath; Pugh, Oliver (2017). Introducing Epigenetics. Icon Books.

== Reception ==
Professor David B. Richman, writing in Reports of the National Center for Science Education, described the book as, "a rather charming graphic account of Darwin's ideas." Professor Richard C. Lewontin, writing in New York Review of Books, describes the book as, "a superb introduction to a very tricky subject." Los Angeles Times reviewer Charles Solomon, however, dismisses it as, "a competent but by no means extraordinary biography."

Professor Jon Seger, writing in New Scientist, describes the style of author Jonathan Miller, who he point out is primarily known as a TV physician, as, "that of a television documentary." While Miller's text is, according to Lewontin, "historically correct, scientifically impeccable," with, "all the emphasis in the right place."

Van Loon's illustrations are, according to Lewontin, "a constant reminder not to take the life of the mind more seriously than it deserves." Seger describes, "the stream of rapidly changing images," as, "full of action," although at times, "pointlessly vulgar."

Miller and Van Loon have, concludes Seger, "not produced a work of scholarship," but have, "brought to life an important chapter of scientific history."
