= Oscar Zárate =

Argentine comic book artist and illustrator

- Born: 1942 (age 83–84) Argentina
- Area: Artist
- Notable works: A Small Killing

Oscar Zárate (born 1942) is an Argentine comic book artist and illustrator. Zarate studied architecture and had a successful career in advertising in Argentina. He moved to Europe in 1971 and began to work in earnest as an illustrator. He has drawn for the UK comics magazine Crisis. In the Introducing... and ...For Beginners book series he illustrated texts written by Richard Appignanesi, Alexei Sayle, Dylan Evans, J P McEvoy, Angus Gellatly, Rupert Woodfin and Christopher Marlowe. He is perhaps best known in the United States as the artist for the graphic novel A Small Killing written by Alan Moore, a one-shot story about a rising star in the world of advertising who is being stalked by a sadistic child.

== Bibliography ==
As artist, unless otherwise noted

- Lenin for Beginners (Writers and Readers, 1977) — written by Richard Appignanesi
- Freud for Beginners (Writers and Readers, 1979) — written by Richard Appignanesi
- William Shakespeare's Othello (Ravette, 1983)
- Dr Faustus (World Theatre Classics) (Abacus, 1986, ISBN 0349101078) - written by Christopher Marlowe
- Geoffrey the Tube Train and the Fat Comedian (Methuen, 1987, ISBN 0-413-59950-7) — written by Alexei Sayle
- A Small Killing (VG Graphics, 1991) — written by Alan Moore
- Stephen Hawking for Beginners (Icon Books, 1995) — written by J.P. McEvoy
- Quantum Theory for Beginners (Icon Books, 1996) — written by J.P. McEvoy
- Mind & Brain for Beginners (Icon Books, 1998) — written by Angus Gellatly
- Introducing Evolutionary Psychology (Icon Books, 1999) — written by Dylan Evans
- Introducing Existentialism (Icon Books, 2001) — written by Richard Appignanesi
- Introducing Marxism (Icon Books, 2004) — written by Rupert Woodfin
- It's Dark in London (SelfMadeHero, 2012) — editor, written and illustrated by various artists and authors
- The Park (SelfMadeHero, 2013)
- Graphic Freud: Hysteria (SelfMadeHero, 2015) — words by Richard Appignanesi
- Thomas Girtin: The Forgotten Painter (SelfMadeHero, 2023)
