= DNA for Beginners =

1983 graphic study guide

- First edition cover
- Author: Israel Rosenfield; Edward Ziff
- Illustrator: Borin Van Loon
- Language: English
- Series: For Beginners
- Subject: DNA
- Publisher: Writers & Readers Publishing
- Publication date: 1983
- Publication place: United Kingdom; United States
- Media type: Print
- ISBN: 0-86316-022-0

DNA for Beginners, republished as DNA: A Graphic Guide to the Molecule that Shook the World, is a 1983 graphic study guide to DNA written by Professor Israel Rosenfield from the City University of New York with Professor Edward Ziff from the New York University School of Medicine, and illustrated by Borin Van Loon. The content of the book is about the discovery and importance of DNA, examining the impact of DNA research on society and discussing its significance in history and for the future of life on Earth. The book, according to its authors, "combines humor, scientific depth, and philosophical and historical insights." in the hope that, "it will interest a wide range of readers."

== Publication history ==
This volume was the first in the For Beginners series to published simultaneously in the United States and the United Kingdom. According to Van Loon, the title's illustrator, preparation of the book took fourteen months. Originally published by Writers & Readers Publishing in 1983 and republished, with an alternate cover, the following year, the subsequent publication history of the book has been described by Van Loon as chequered.

The book was marketed as an ideal supplement to a previous volume in the series, Darwin for Beginners, written by Jonathan Miller and illustrated by Borin Van Loon. After it went out-of-print, Icon Books, the UK based publishers of the series commissioned Genetics for Beginners, written by Steve Jones and illustrated by Van Loon, to fulfil this role from 1993.

Jim Jordan, director of Columbia University Press, commissioned an updated version of the long out-of-print volume from the authors, which was published in 2011.

== Reception ==
A New York Times reviewer, Harold M. Schmeck Jr., stated that, "all the main points are here," and described it as, "a painless way of catching up on the basics." A reviewer in The Harvard Crimson described the book as, "thoroughly researched, simply written, beautifully laid out," and claims it, "more serious than most popular science writing." Stanley Shostack, writing in The European Legacy, while generally positive, concluded that, due to the ambiguity, the revised edition is, "probably not a stand-alone introduction for interested non-students."

Schmeck described the text as "wry, terse and easy to understand" and that, "it conveys a remarkable amount of information." The Harvard Crimson reviewer confirmed that the authors "provide precision with an English brevity of expression," and that "the text can remain simple and straightforward and avoid the eye-catching exaggeration all too common in science journalism."

Schmeck compared the cartoons, which he described as "imaginative, often outrageous," to the work of surrealist comedy group Monty Python. The Harvard Crimson reviewer described the illustrations as, "clever and exhaustive," and stated that they should be, "the required text for anyone who wants to design educational graphics." Shostack, however, found it regrettable that, "illustrations rise to the level of humour at the expense of precision." Cian O'Luanaigh, writing in New Scientist, conversely claimed the book, "reads more like an abridged textbook," where "text dominate[s] at the expense of images," and concluded that, "comic-book fans should seek their biology elsewhere."

== Legacy ==
Van Loon's illustrations from this book provided the inspiration for his Health Matters Gallery mural at the Science Museum, London, which was opened on 9 June 1994 by Professor James Watson, and were featured in the special exhibition, Representations of DNA, at the Whipple Museum of the History of Science in Cambridge in 2003.
