= Borin Van Loon =

British illustrator and cartoonist

- Born: 1951 East Anglia, UK
- Area: Artist
- Notable works: Introducing... series

Borin Van Loon (born 1951 in East Anglia) is a British illustrator and comic book artist, best known for his illustrations for the Introducing... series of graphic books on complex subjects. He is an author, collagist, and surrealist painter, and has worked for a wide variety of clients in editorial, publishing and promotion. He has created an eclectic collage/cartoon mural on the subject of DNA and genetics for the Health Matters Gallery in London's Science Museum.

Van Loon published The Bart Dickon Omnibus of his hero's derring-do in 2005 comprising a surrealist collage graphic novel. Roger Sabin, a writer about comics and lecturer at Central St. Martins in London, England, said of the Bart Dickon series:

Van Loon's dapper, nay sartorially gifted, creation Bart Dickon is ostensibly an affectionate homage to the boys' heroes of the 1930s-40s story papers and comics. But look closer and you begin to see that the wonderful collage style of the stories hearkens back to a different period — namely, the high-water mark of underground experimentation in the 1960s and 70s (think Oz/IT/Cyclops) — and that Dickon is a very different kind of hero, again with echoes from that Hippie era (his intra-dimensional adventuring is pure Jerry Cornelius, and his left-wing politics certainly don't fit the 1930s-40s template). Dickon may be a delightful mish-mash of influences and styles, but call him 'postmodern' and he's likely to want to 'teach you a lesson' — without getting his Jermyn Street tailored shirt creased, of course.

Van Loon's collage comic strip approach to storytelling relies almost solely upon found images, serendipity in research, and the use of a narrative to bind the images, speech and thought bubbles, and text boxes together. The roots of collage comic-strip can be found in the sound-collage experiments of Ron Geesin, the animations of Monty Python (during the Terry Gilliam era), the surrealist novels of Max Ernst (Une Semaine de Bonté and 'La femme de 100 têtes), the agit-prop visuals of the Situationists, the psychedelic posters and graphics of Martin Sharp and the satires of Biff.

Originally appearing as separate strips under the title 'A Severed Head' (a nod to the Iris Murdoch novel), Bart Dickon appeared in Brain Damage, Talking Turkey, Sun Zoom Spark and The Chap magazines. The author gathered a number of these comics, reworked and added new material to create a graphic novella.

Van Loon illustrated Capitalism for Beginners, Darwin for Beginners, and DNA for Beginners (in eclectic documentary comic book format) for Writers and Readers in the early 1980s. He has since has illustrated more than a dozen entries in the Introducing... series, published by Icon Books in the UK, including four titles written by Ziauddin Sardar.

Van Loon has written, designed and illustrated two model-making books: DNA: The Marvellous Molecule, which enables the reader to build a colour model of the double-helix structure discovered in 1953 by Francis Crick and James D. Watson with Maurice Wilkins and Rosalind Franklin; and Geodesic Domes, where the models celebrate the pioneering work of Buckminster Fuller. He also painted many oil studies and designed the diagrams for the Letts Pocket Guide To The Weather.

/blankpage was a collaborative project with sixteen other artists belonging to Freelance (which Borin chairs) created for Ip-Art 2004. It consisted of a book as an art object with pages in widely varying media, all put together by a bookbinder. /blankpage now has a permanent home in the Suffolk Record Office, Ipswich.

== Bibliography ==
- DNA: The Marvellous Molecule (Parkwest Pubns), 1991, ISBN 978-0906212752
- Letts Pocket Guide to the Weather (written by Eleanor Lawrence, New Holland Publishers Ltd), 1993
- Geodesic Domes (Parkwest Pubns), 1994, ISBN 978-0906212929
- The Bart Dickon Omnibus (Severed Head Books), 2005, ISBN 978-0955157905

=== ...For Beginners series (Writers and Readers) ===
- Capitalism for Beginners (written by Robert Lekachman), 1981
- Darwin for Beginners (written by Jonathan Miller), 1982
- DNA for Beginners (written by Israel Rosenfield and Ed Ziff), 1983

=== Introducing... series (Icon Books) ===
- Introducing Darwin (written by Jonathan Miller), 1992 — re-issue of the 1982 Writers and Readers book, Darwin for Beginners
- Introducing Genetics (written by Steve Jones), 1993
- Introducing Buddha (written by Jane Hope), 1994
- Introducing Sociology (written by Richard Osborne), 1996
- Introducing Cultural Studies (written by Ziauddin Sardar), 1997
- Introducing Mathematics (written by Ziauddin Sardar), 1999
- Introducing Science Studies (written by Ziauddin Sardar), 1998
- Introducing Eastern Philosophy (written by Richard Osborne), 2000
- Introducing Media Studies (written by Ziauddin Sardar), 2000
- Introducing Critical Theory (written by Stuart Sim), 2001
- Introducing Hinduism (written by Vinay Lal), 2001
- Introducing Psychotherapy (written by Nigel C. Benson), 2003
- Introducing Statistics (written by Eileen Magnello), 2009

== See also ==
- Introducing Book Series
