= Nigel Benson =

British author and illustrator

- Born: Nigel C. Benson; 15 January 1955 (age 71) Newport Pagnell, Buckinghamshire, England, United Kingdom
- Occupation: Author, Illustrator

Nigel C. Benson (born January 15, 1955) is a British author and illustrator.

Benson was born in Newport Pagnell, Buckinghamshire, son of Ralph H. Benson, a fine artist specializing in oils and pastels, and Heather M. Benson. He grew up in Dunstable, Bedfordshire, and was educated at Dunstable Grammar School (where film star Gary Cooper and other notables were taught). He gained an Honours Degree in Psychology at North East London Polytechnic (now the University of East London) and a master's degree in Education through the Open University. He is a PhD research student at the University of London Institute of Education.

Dunstable in Detail (1986), published by The Book Castle, was Nigel Benson's first full-length book. This book includes original pen-and-ink illustrations and photographs plus a unique pull-out map of Dunstable town centre. There are 100 numbered features of interest within a half mile radius of the crossroads at the town centre, plus an extensive index and bibliography, enabling the book to be used as a practical tour guide as well as the standard reference for Dunstable's history.

The book cover shows the Dunstable Priory Church, founded 1132 (one of the original illustrations by Nigel Benson). It was at this church that Henry VIII formally announced his divorce with Queen Catherine of Aragon in 1533. Nigel Benson is more widely known for his trilogy of books in the Introducing... series, published by Icon Books (UK) / Totem (US):

- Introducing Psychology (1998), an international best-seller, has been published in 20 languages in 27 countries. Nigel Benson designed the original cover.
- Introducing Psychotherapy (2003), illustrated by Borin Van Loon, includes a summary of alternative/complementary therapies as well as the conventional therapies, including the talking cures of psychoanalysis, behavioural and cognitive techniques, somatic solutions, and individual and group therapies.
- Introducing Psychiatry (2004), illustrated by Piero, includes a brief history of psychiatry, what happens when someone visits a psychiatrist, a summary of the eight main categories of mental disorders, criticisms such as the Anti-Psychiatry movement, and the possible future of psychiatry.

Other writings include contributions to the three separate hardback books:

- The Healing Brain (Reader's Digest, 2002)
- A Good Memory (Reader's Digest, 2002)
- The Conscious and Unconscious Brain (Reader's Digest, 2002)
