= Vinay Lal =

Indian historian

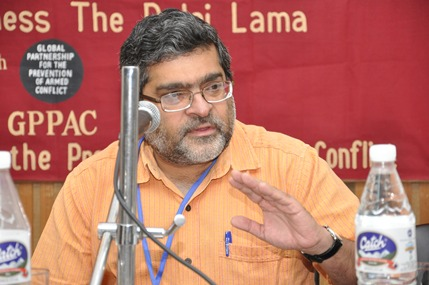
- Born: 1961 (age 64–65); Delhi, India
- Education: Johns Hopkins University (BA, MA); University of Chicago (PhD)
- Occupations: Author, professor
- Known for: Oxford Anthology of the Modern Indian City

Vinay Lal is an Indian historian. He is a professor of history and Asian American studies at UCLA. He writes widely on the history and culture of colonial and modern India, popular and public culture in India, cinema, historiography, the politics of world history, the Indian diaspora, global politics, contemporary American politics, the life and thought of Mohandas Gandhi, Hinduism, and the politics of knowledge systems.

== Youth ==
Lal was born to an Indian foreign service officer in Delhi in 1961. Due to his father’s constant movement because of his diplomatic career, he grew up in Delhi, Tokyo, Jakarta, and Washington, D.C. In Delhi he attended Springdales School. He spent four years in Tokyo, 1965–69, but has almost no memory of those years; and it is not until 1987 that he returned to Japan for a short visit, followed by a lengthier stay of four months in Osaka in 1999 when he was a Fellow of the Japan Society for the Promotion of Science at the National Museum of Ethnology (Minpaku).

== Academic career ==
He earned his BA and MA, both in 1982, from the Humanities Center at the Johns Hopkins University and wrote his Master's thesis on Ralph Waldo Emerson and Indian philosophy. Lal then studied cinema in Australia and India on a Thomas J. Watson Fellowship before commencing his graduate studies at the University of Chicago, where he was awarded a PhD with Distinction from the Department of South Asian Languages and Civilizations in 1992. He was William Kenan Fellow in the Society of Fellows in the Humanities at Columbia University in 1992–93, and since 1993 has been on the faculty of history at the University of California, Los Angeles (UCLA), where he also holds a joint appointment in Asian American Studies.

== Publication ==
Lal is the author or editor of fifteen books. His first, The Empire of Knowledge: Culture and Plurality in the Global Economy, argues that nothing has been more effectively, even insidiously, globalised than the knowledge systems of the West. The History of History: Politics and Scholarship in Modern India, is a study of the politics of history-writing in India since the early 19th century; the book also makes an unusual argument, naturally not well received by historians, to the effect that ahistoricity has been one of the most characteristic features of Indian civilisation, at least until the beginning of Muslim dynasties. Unlike colonial writers, however, Lal does not even remotely construe the absence of histories as a lack. The book was reviewed widely in the Indian press, and in scholarly journals in India and abroad, and nearly full page excerpts appeared in the Hindustan Times and the Indian Express. A new edition of the book, with a fresh foreword, appeared in 2005, and the book is in its sixth impression.

Introducing Hinduism, illustrated by Borin van Loon, is Lal's contribution to the "Introducing" Series; the book has been translated into Spanish, Korean, and Finnish. The book was reissued in 2010 as Introducing Hinduism: A Graphic Guide. Political Hinduism: The Religious Imagination in Public Spheres (Delhi: Oxford University Press, 2009) is a collection of eight essays, but the book is not centrally concerned with the rise of Hindu nationalism as such; rather, it considers what a political Hinduism might be that is not Hindutva. Another of Lal's abiding interests is cinema, and his book on Deewaar, the 1975 blockbuster Hindi-language film with Amitabh Bachchan and some of the most memorable dialogues in Indian film history – "mere paas ma hain" ("I have mother") – was published by HarperCollins in 2011. His co-edited book, Fingerprinting Popular Culture: The Mythic and the Iconic in Indian Cinema, appeared from Oxford University Press (2006). It is one of two books, along with The Future of Knowledge and Culture: A Dictionary for the Twenty-first Century, he has co-edited with Ashis Nandy, arguably India's most prominent intellectual. Lal's engagement with the work of Nandy commenced in the late 1980s, and led eventually to the first serious assessment of Nandy's work, published as Dissenting Knowledges, Open Futures: The Multiple Selves and Strange Destinations of Ashis Nandy.

The range of Lal’s intellectual, cultural and political interests is perhaps best explored in his collection of eight essays, Of Cricket, Guinness and Gandhi: Essays on Indian History and Culture. Writing on cricket, the hijras, popular cinema, Gandhi, the national-security state in India, notions of masculinity, and the obsession with the Guinness Book of Records, Lal argues that there is a tension between the idea of India as a nation-state and the idea of India as a civilisation. How India resolves this tension may well determine the course of India's future.

Lal's most recent work is The Oxford Anthology of the Modern Indian City (Oxford, 2013) in two complementary volumes. The anthology draws upon the writings of nearly 100 writers, some of great eminence and some of whom are relatively little known. This is a very personal and yet critical anthology, prefaced by a long introduction, focused on how the city in India has been imagined, and the antinomies it invokes are of day and night, passion and reflection, exclusion and inclusion. The writers represented in it include Nirad Chauduri, Gieve Patel, Premendra Mitra, Nissim Ezekiel, Ananthamurthy, Tagore, Pritish Nandy, Buddhadev Bose, Ravi Dayal, Amitav Ghosh, Daya Pawar, Chandralekha, and Prakash Jadhav, and contemporary intellectuals such as Thomas Blom Hansen, Shiv Viswanathan, Sumanta Banerjee, and Ashis Nandy.

== Contributions ==
Lal has been involved in various initiatives designed to enhance South-Asian cultural and political contacts, foster systematic critiques of dominant knowledge systems and the various imperialisms of the West, and suggest more ecumenical futures for all humanity. Prominently among these initiatives is Multiversity, an organisation of activists, scholars, and intellectuals from the Global South that has had four meetings in Penang, Malaysia, since 2002. Lal is the founding editor of the Dissenting Knowledges Pamphlet Series, under which eleven works have appeared so far, and also the Asian Thinkers (Pamphlet Series), launched in 2011. Both series are initiatives of Multiversity and Citizens International. He has also been associated with INCAD (International Network for Cultural Alternatives to Development), the Intercultural Institute of Montreal, and the Coalition for an Egalitarian and Pluralistic India (Los Angeles).

For some years, Lal wrote a column for the Economic and Political Weekly (Mumbai) published as "Letter from America". He is an acerbic critic of American foreign policy and many aspects of American society. Lal is equally a critic of Hindu nationalism, and his op-ed piece in the Los Angeles Times, "Coming Out From Gandhi's Shadow" (19 May 1998), was the first piece in a major American newspaper to sharply criticise India's nuclear explosions. Lal's views on American society and politics have earned him a place in David Horowitz's The Professors: The 101 Most Dangerous Academics in America

== Books ==
- The Fury of COVID-19: The Passions, Histories, and Unrequited Love of the Corona Virus (Delhi: Pan Macmillan, 2020).
- The Oxford Anthology of the Modern Indian City: Making and Unmaking the City—Politics, Culture, and Life Forms (Delhi: Oxford University Press, 2013).
- The Oxford Anthology of the Modern Indian City: The City In its Plenitude (Delhi: Oxford University Press, 2013).
- (Edited) Mohandas K. Gandhi, Colonialism and the Call to Freedom (with an introduction by Vinay Lal) (Penang: Citizens International & Multiversity, 2011).
- Deewaar: The Footpath, the City, and the Angry Young Man (Delhi: HarperCollins, 2011).
- Introducing Hinduism: A Graphic Guide (London: Icon Books, 2010).
- (Edited) Political Hinduism: The Religious Imagination in Public Spheres (Delhi: Oxford University Press, 2009).
- Empire of Knowledge: Culture and Plurality in the Global Economy (London: Pluto Press, 2002; new updated edition, Sage Publishers, 2005; Urdu translation, published as Ilm ki Sultanat, from Mashal Books, Lahore, 2009).
- The Other Indians: A Political and Cultural History of South Asians in America (Los Angeles: Asian American Studies Center Press, UCLA and New Delhi: HarperCollins, 2008).
- (Co-edited with Ashis Nandy) Fingerprinting Popular Culture: The Mythic and Iconic in Indian Cinema (Delhi: Oxford University Press, 2006; Oxford India Paperback, 2007).
- (Co-edited with Ashis Nandy) The Future of Knowledge and Culture: A Dictionary for the Twenty-first Century (Delhi: Viking Penguin, 2005; Kannada translation, 2007).
- Of Cricket, Guinness and Gandhi: Essays on Indian History and Culture (Calcutta: Seagull Books, 2003; paperback ed., Penguin Books, 2005).
- Introducing Hinduism (London: Icon Books, 2005).
- The History of History: Politics and Scholarship in Modern India (Delhi: Oxford University Press, 2003; new edition, 2005).
- Empire and the Dream-Work of America. Dissenting Knowledges Pamphlet Series, no. 4 (Penang: Multiversity and Citizens International, 2004).
- (Edited) Dissenting Knowledges, Open Futures: The Multiple Selves and Strange Destinations of Ashis Nandy (Delhi: Oxford University Press, 2000).
- (Edited) The History of Railway Thieves, by M. Pauparao Naidu (4th ed., 1915; reprint with critical introduction by Vinay Lal, Gurgaon, Haryana, Vintage Books, 1996).
- South Asian Cultural Studies: A Bibliography (Delhi: Manohar Books, 1996).

=== Publications ===
- Implications of American Islamophobia, Economic and Political Weekly, Vol. 50, Issue No. 51, 19 Dec, 2015
