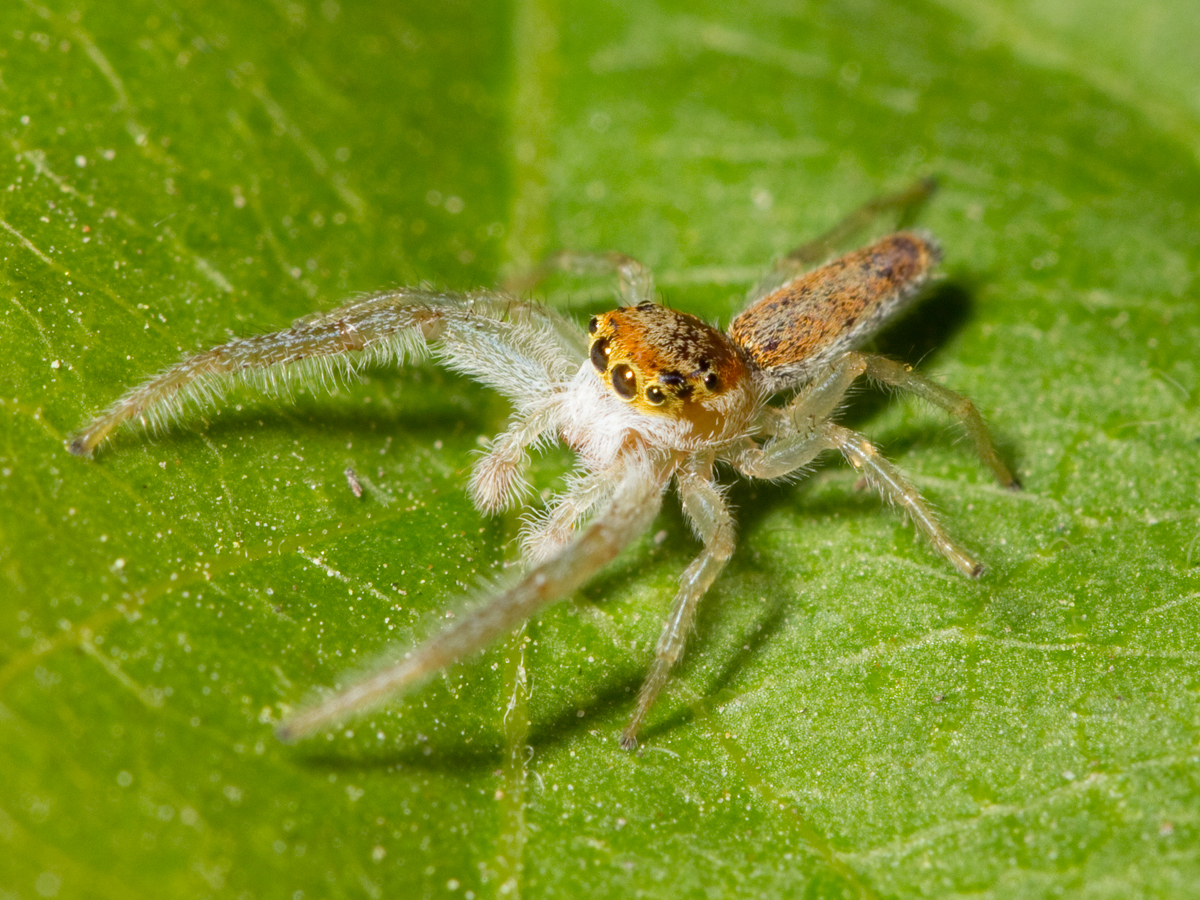
- Male Hentzia mitrata
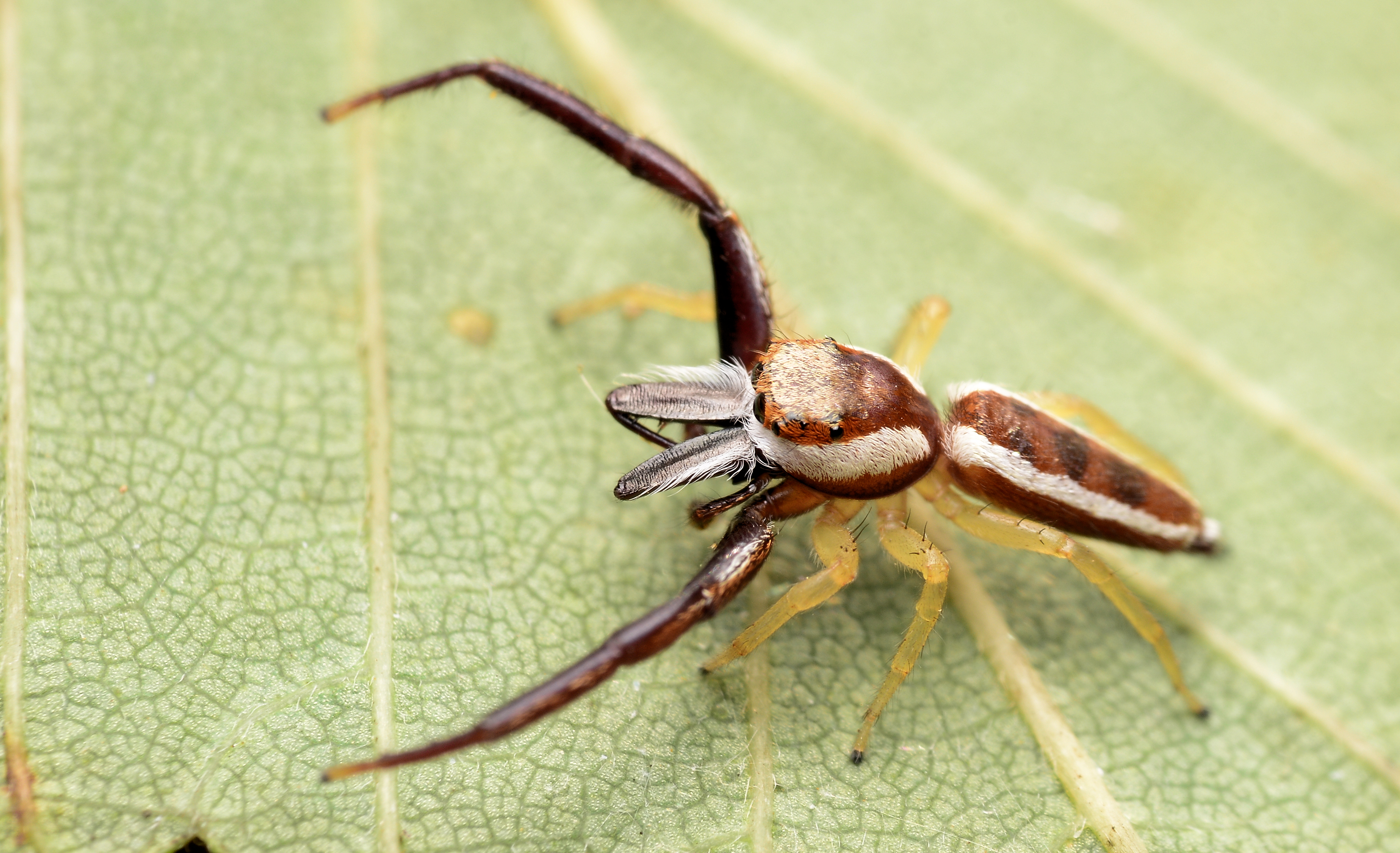
- Male Hentzia palmarum

Scientific classification
- Kingdom: Animalia
- Phylum: Arthropoda
- Subphylum: Chelicerata
- Class: Arachnida
- Order: Araneae
- Infraorder: Araneomorphae
- Family: Salticidae
- Subfamily: Salticinae
- Genus: Hentzia; Marx, 1883

Type species
- Epiblemum palmarum Hentz, 1832

Species
- See text.

Synonyms
- Wala Keyserling, 1885; Anoka Peckham and Peckham, 1893; Parahentzia Bryant, 1943; Maeviobeata Caporiacco, 1947

= Hentzia =

Genus of spiders

Hentzia is a genus of the spider family Salticidae (jumping spiders) subfamily Dendryphantinae. The genus is widespread in North America and northern South America but the center of biodiversity seems to be primarily in the Caribbean and surrounding areas, with the greatest species diversity occurring in Cuba, which has seven species. Some outlier species, such as Hentzia poenitens and Hentzia fimbriata are found in western North America. It appears to be closely related to the genus Anicius from which it differs primarily in certain anatomical details.

== Etymology ==
G. Marx named this genus in 1883 after Nicholas Marcellus Hentz, who described the type species Hentzia palmarum (as Epiblemum palmarum), as well as Hentzia mitrata (as Attus mitratus), in 1846.

== Description ==
The genus is characterized by the females especially having hair (setal) pencils below the posterior medial eyes and spatulate hairs on the ventral margin of the first patella and distal femur. These characters are not found in Anicius and there are some differences in the structure of both male palpi and female epigyna. However, the anatomy is close enough that there is almost certainly some relationship to Anicius.

== Behavior ==
Hentzia males perform fairly elaborate courtship displays and engage in both ritual agonistic displays and fighting. Displays have been observed in Hentzia palmarum, Hentzia mitrata, Hentzia antillana, and Hentzia grenada and are suspected in the rest. In the species that have been observed, courtship begins with the male spreading his front legs and with the abdomen cocked to right or left and raised at an angle of about 30 degrees above the substrate.

Males of H. palmarum started courtship from a distance of about 3–4 cm if the female moved even slightly. Some males were observed to switch the abdomen from right to left or left to right during courtship, but most kept the orientation with which they started the display. Most males moved toward the female in a zigzag path (with a sideways motion as much as 1 cm), with pauses during which the abdomen was straightened and then re-twisted. However some males proceeded in a straight path. When the male reached about 1 cm from the female he straightened his abdomen and stretched his front legs forward, eventually touching the female, raising and lowering his legs two or three times. If she was receptive the male then see-sawed his front legs over her several times and then mounted and twisted her abdomen before inserting one palp into her epigynum, repeating with a second palp on the other side.

Males would often repeat mating several times until the female started to move. Male-male agonistic display initially began like courtship, but within seconds the males would unsheathe their fangs and move toward each other with abdomens cocked and front legs spread. If the males were of similar size they would usually lock chelicerae and touch spread front legs, trying to bite. Often one would break away and retreat. On occasion one did get bitten and leave with a damaged front leg.

== Species ==
As of 2020, there were 22 recognized species:

- Hentzia alamosa Richman, 2010 – United States (Texas)
- Hentzia antillana Bryant, 1940 – West Indies
- Hentzia audax Bryant, 1940 – Cuba
- Hentzia calypso Richman, 1989 – Jamaica
- Hentzia chekika Richman, 1989 – United States (Florida), Bahama Islands, Cuba
- Hentzia cubana Richman, 1989 – Cuba
- Hentzia elegans (Keyserling, 1885) – North America
- Hentzia fimbriata (F. O. P-Cambridge, 1901) – Mexico to Colombia
- Hentzia footei (Petrunkevitch, 1914) – Lesser Antilles
- Hentzia grenada (Peckham & Peckham, 1894) – United States (Florida and Georgia)
- Hentzia mandibularis (Bryant, 1943) – Hispaniola
- Hentzia mitrata (Hentz, 1846) – United States, Canada, Bahama Islands
- Hentzia palmarum (Hentz, 1832) – North America, Bermuda, Bahama Islands, Cuba
- Hentzia parallela (Peckham & Peckham, 1894) – Honduras to Trinidad
- Hentzia pima Richman, 1989 – United States
- Hentzia poenitens (Chamberlin, 1924) – Mexico
- Hentzia squamata (Petrunkevitch, 1930) – Puerto Rico
- Hentzia tibialis Bryant, 1940 – Cuba
- Hentzia vernalis (Peckham & Peckham, 1893) – Colombia to St. Vincent
- Hentzia vittata (Keyserling, 1885) – Greater Antilles
- Hentzia whitcombi Richman, 1989 – Puerto Rico, Lesser Antilles
- Hentzia zombia Richman, 1989 – Hispaniola

H. elegans is dubious and is almost certainly not a Hentzia.
