= Genetics for Beginners =

1993 study guide

- First edition cover
- Author: Steve Jones
- Illustrator: Borin Van Loon
- Language: English
- Series: Introducing...
- Subject: Genetics
- Publisher: Icon Books
- Publication date: 1993
- Publication place: United Kingdom
- Media type: Print
- ISBN: 1874166129

Genetics for Beginners, republished as Introducing Genetics, is a 1993 graphic study guide to Genetics written by Steve Jones and illustrated by Borin Van Loon. The volume, according to the publisher's website, "takes readers on a journey through this new science to the discovery of DNA and the heart of the human gene map," and, "gives us the information," to, "make moral decisions where genetics plays a part."

== Publication history ==
This volume was originally published in the UK by Icon Books in 1993 as Genetics for Beginners, and subsequently republished with different covers as Introducing Genetics and Introducing Genetics: A Graphic Guide.

The book was described, by illustrator Borin Van Loon, as a companion to Darwin for Beginners (1982), a previous volume in the series, and as a stand in for the long out-of-print DNA for Beginners (1983), both of which he illustrated.

Editions:

- Genetics for Beginners. Icon Books. 1993. ISBN 1874166129.
- Introducing Genetics. Icon Books. 2000. ISBN 1840461209.
- Introducing Genetics: A Graphic Guide. Icon Books. 2011. ISBN 978-1848312951.

Related volumes in the series:

- Miller, Jonathan; Van Loon, Borin (1992). Darwin for Beginners. Icon Books. ISBN 1874166013.
- Evans, Dylan; Zárate, Oscar (1999). Introducing Evolutionary Psychology. Icon Books.
- Evans, Dylan; Selina, Howard (2001). Introducing Evolution. Icon Books. ISBN 1840462655.
- Ennis, Cath; Pugh, Oliver (2017). Introducing Epigenetics. Icon Books.

== Legacy ==
Van Loon's illustrations from this book provided the inspiration for his Health Matters Gallery mural at the Science Museum, London, which was opened on 9 June 1994 by Professor James Watson, and were featured in the special exhibition, Representations of DNA, at the Whipple Museum of the History of Science in Cambridge in 2003.
