= The Universe for Beginners =

Graphic study guide to cosmology by Felix Pirani

- 1999 edition cover
- Author: Felix Pirani
- Illustrator: Christine Roche
- Language: English
- Series: Introducing...
- Subject: Cosmology
- Publisher: Icon Books
- Publication date: 1993
- Publication place: United Kingdom
- Media type: Print
- ISBN: 1874166064

The Universe for Beginners, republished as Introducing the Universe, is a 1993 graphic study guide to cosmology written by Felix Pirani and illustrated by Christine Roche. The volume, according to the publisher's website, "recounts the revolutions in physics and astronomy," from "Aristotle to Newton," and, "Einstein to Quantum Mechanics," "that underlie the present-day picture of the universe."

== Publication history ==
This volume was originally published in the UK by Icon Books in 1993 as The Universe for Beginners, and subsequently republished with different covers as Introducing the Universe and Introducing the Universe: A Graphic Guide.

Editions:

- The Universe for Beginners. Icon Books. 1993. ISBN 1874166064.
- Introducing the Universe. Icon Books. 1999. ISBN 1840460687.
- Introducing the Universe: A Graphic Guide. Icon Books. 2012. ISBN 978-1848314184.

Related volumes in the series:

- Schwartz, Joseph; McGuinness, Michael (1992). Einstein for Beginners. Icon Books. ISBN 1874166021.
- Rankin, William (1993). Newton for Beginners. Icon Books. ISBN 1863734953.
- McEvoy, J.P.; Zárate, Oscar (1995). Stephen Hawking for Beginners. Icon Books.
- McEvoy, J.P.; Zárate, Oscar (1996). Quantum Theory for Beginners. Icon Books.
- Callender, Craig; Edney, Ralph (2001). Introducing Time. Icon Books.
- Bassett, Bruce; Edney, Ralph (2002). Introducing Relativity. Icon Books. ISBN 1840463724.
- Clegg, Brian; Pugh, Oliver (2012). Introducing Infinity. Icon Books.
- Whyntie, Tom; Pugh, Oliver (2013). Introducing Particle Physics. Icon Books.

== Reception ==
Norwegian philosopher Finngeir Hiorth states that the book, like its companion volume, Stephen Hawking for Beginners, starts with, "historical passages dealing with earlier ideas about the Universe," before, "bringing the story up-to-date." Pirani's text is, according to Hiorth, "written in a simple and easily understandable language with a minimum of formulas," with terminology, "always explained." "[P]rofusely illustrated." by Roche, the volume is, Hiorth concludes, "like comics or funnies," where, "quite a lot of the information is formulated in an entertaining way."
