= Newton for Beginners =

Book written and illustrated by William Rankin

- First edition cover
- Author: William Rankin
- Language: English
- Series: Introducing...
- Subject: Isaac Newton; Classical Physics
- Publisher: Icon Books (UK); Totem Books (US)
- Publication date: 1993
- Publication place: United Kingdom
- Media type: Print
- ISBN: 1863734953

Newton for Beginners, republished as Introducing Newton, is a 1993 graphic study guide to the Isaac Newton and classical physics written and illustrated by William Rankin. The volume, according to the publisher's website, "explains the extraordinary ideas of a man who [...] single-handedly made enormous advances in mathematics, mechanics and optics," and, "was also a secret heretic, a mystic and an alchemist."

"William Rankin," Public Understanding of Science reviewer Patrick Fullick confirms, "sets out to illuminate the man whose work laid the foundations of the physics of the last 350 years, and to place him and his work in the context of the times in which he lived." New Scientist reviewer Roy Herbert adds that, "alongside theories of the Universe from ancient times, the book explains those originating since Isaac Newton, so placing him deftly in his scientific context."

== Publication history ==
This volume was originally published in the UK by Icon Books in 1993 as Newton for Beginners, and subsequently republished with different covers in different editions.

Selected editions:

- Newton for Beginners. Icon Books. 1993. ISBN 978-1863734950.
- Introducing Newton and Classical Physics. Icon Books. 2000. ISBN 978-1840461589.
- Introducing Newton. Icon Books. 2007. ISBN 978-1840468427.
- Introducing Newton: A Graphic Guide. Icon Books. 2012. ISBN 978-1848311763.

Related volumes in the series:

- Schwartz, Joseph; McGuinness, Michael (1992). Einstein for Beginners. Icon Books. ISBN 978-1874166023.
- Felix, Pirani; Christina, Roche (1993). The Universe for Beginners. Icon Books. ISBN 978-1874166061.
- McEvoy, J.P.; Zárate, Oscar (1995). Stephen Hawking for Beginners. Icon Books.
- McEvoy, J.P.; Zárate, Oscar (1996). Quantum Theory for Beginners. Icon Books.
- Callender, Craig; Edney, Ralph (2001). Introducing Time. Icon Books.
- Bassett, Bruce; Edney, Ralph (2002). Introducing Relativity. Icon Books. ISBN 978-1840463729.
- Clegg, Brian; Pugh, Oliver (2012). Introducing Infinity. Icon Books.
- Whyntie, Tom; Pugh, Oliver (2013). Introducing Particle Physics. Icon Books.

== Reception ==
"This book shares the general characteristics of the Beginners series with a large number of line drawings and cartoons with associated text and many asides," states Patrick Fullick, writing in Public Understanding of Science, "for some readers the asides may seem idiosyncratic or even annoying." "Some may dislike the humour and bad puns that abound in this work," confirms Bill Palmer, writing in the Journal of the Science Teacher Association of the Northern Territory, "but I suspect that those starting the study of Newton's life and work will appreciate this attempt to facilitate reading."

"The book is well-grounded in recent historiography," and, "Rankin is clearly sympathetic towards his subject," states Fullick, "but inevitably Newton still comes over as one whose intellectual vanity was at times apt to overcome his self-control." Roy Herbert, writing in New Scientist, confirms that despite being a colossus, "Many of his contemporaries saw him as something else and these bit players provide a background of 17th-century backbiting and squabbling (Newton took part) that is always fascinating."

"Newton's story is told accurately and entertainingly," concludes Palmer. "It combines drawings with text and pulls off the difficult trick of imparting serious information while keeping the reader amused with jokes and irreverent asides," adds Herbert, "it is a technique that has strong appeal and so, even if you have misgivings about it, you are lured along the trail." "The communication of the idea that the great scientists of the past had their hopes and fears and that they had concerns other than the purely academic or professional is probably done as well pictorially as by other means," confirms Fullick. "Easily swallowed and," concludes Herbert, "retainable."
