= Introducing Relativity =

2002 graphic study guide to relativity theory by Bruce Bassett

- First edition cover
- Author: Bruce Bassett
- Illustrator: Ralph Edney
- Language: English
- Series: Introducing...
- Subject: Relativity; Albert Einstein
- Publisher: Icon Books (UK); Totem Books (US)
- Publication date: 2002
- Publication place: United Kingdom
- Media type: Print
- ISBN: 1840463724

Introducing Relativity is a 2002 graphic study guide to the theory of relativity and Albert Einstein written by Bruce Bassett and illustrated by Ralph Edney. The volume is, according to the publisher's website, "a superlative, fascinating graphic account of Einstein's strange world," which, "plots a visually accessible course through the thought experiments that have given shape to contemporary physics."

"The authors cover everything from time dilation to black holes, string theory to dark energy," confirms Sky at Night Magazine reviewer Professor Nigel Henbest, and, "the going sometimes gets tough." However, "help is at hand," according to New Scientist reviewer Marcus Chown, "to get our heads around stretchy time, shrinking space, black holes, wormholes and the rest."

== Publication history ==
This volume was originally published in the UK by Icon Books and in the US by Totem Books in 2002, and subsequently republished with different covers and the subtitle, A Graphic Guide.

Selected editions:

- Introducing Relativity. Icon Books. 2002. ISBN 1840463724.
- Introducing Relativity. Icon Books. 2006. ISBN 1840467576.
- Introducing Relativity: A Graphic Guide. Icon Books. 2012. ISBN 1848310579.

Related volumes in the series:

- Schwartz, Joseph; McGuinness, Michael (1992). Einstein for Beginners. Icon Books. ISBN 1874166021.
- Rankin, William (1993). Newton for Beginners. Icon Books. ISBN 1863734953.
- Felix, Pirani; Christina, Roche (1993). The Universe for Beginners. Icon Books. ISBN 1874166064.
- McEvoy, J.P.; Zárate, Oscar (1995). Stephen Hawking for Beginners. Icon Books.
- McEvoy, J.P.; Zárate, Oscar (1996). Quantum Theory for Beginners. Icon Books.
- Callender, Craig; Edney, Ralph (2001). Introducing Time. Icon Books.
- Clegg, Brian; Pugh, Oliver (2012). Introducing Infinity. Icon Books.
- Whyntie, Tom; Pugh, Oliver (2013). Introducing Particle Physics. Icon Books.

== Reception ==
Marcus Chown, writing in New Scientist, describes the volume as, "a very attractive illustrated guide to arguably the greatest ever achievement by a single human mind," which, according to Professor Nigel Henbest, writing in Sky at Night Magazine, "has all the answers you need." Science writer Brian Clegg, author of Introducing Infinity (2012) in the same series, however finds the book, "good on content, not so good on bringing it down to the right level."

"Cosmologist Bruce Bassett and mathematician-cartoonist Ralph Edney are awe-inspiring," according to Henbest, "in their attempts at a popular explanation of one of the most daunting areas of science." Chown states that the "remarkable amount of material," touched on by the writers goes, "from inertia to the theory of inflation; from singularity theorems to superstring theory; from unification to accelerating universes." However, Clegg speculates that Bassett's background as a lecturer in cosmology lecturer, "is reflected in the fact there is rather more cosmology in this book than a pure explanation of relativity would require," and in that it, "is much stronger on the theory than the history."

"Unfortunately for a book that appears to be aimed at the absolute beginner," states Clegg, "there are parts that are roughly equivalent to material in the first year of a degree course." "It helps if you have a passing familiarity with some of the concepts," agrees Chown, and, "you'd probably need A-level physics to absorb all of the concepts fully," confirms Henbest.

"Overall," concludes Clegg, "it's a noble attempt, with much (much) more meat in it than the companion Introducing Chaos book - but it would need more historical perspective and less inclination to jump to soon into formulae if it were to appeal to its target audience." Nonetheless, according to Henbest, "the format means it's an easy book to dip into, making cutting-edge science available to everyone," and according to Chown, "anyone with an enquiring mind is bound to take away something as they dip in and out of this highly entertaining book."
