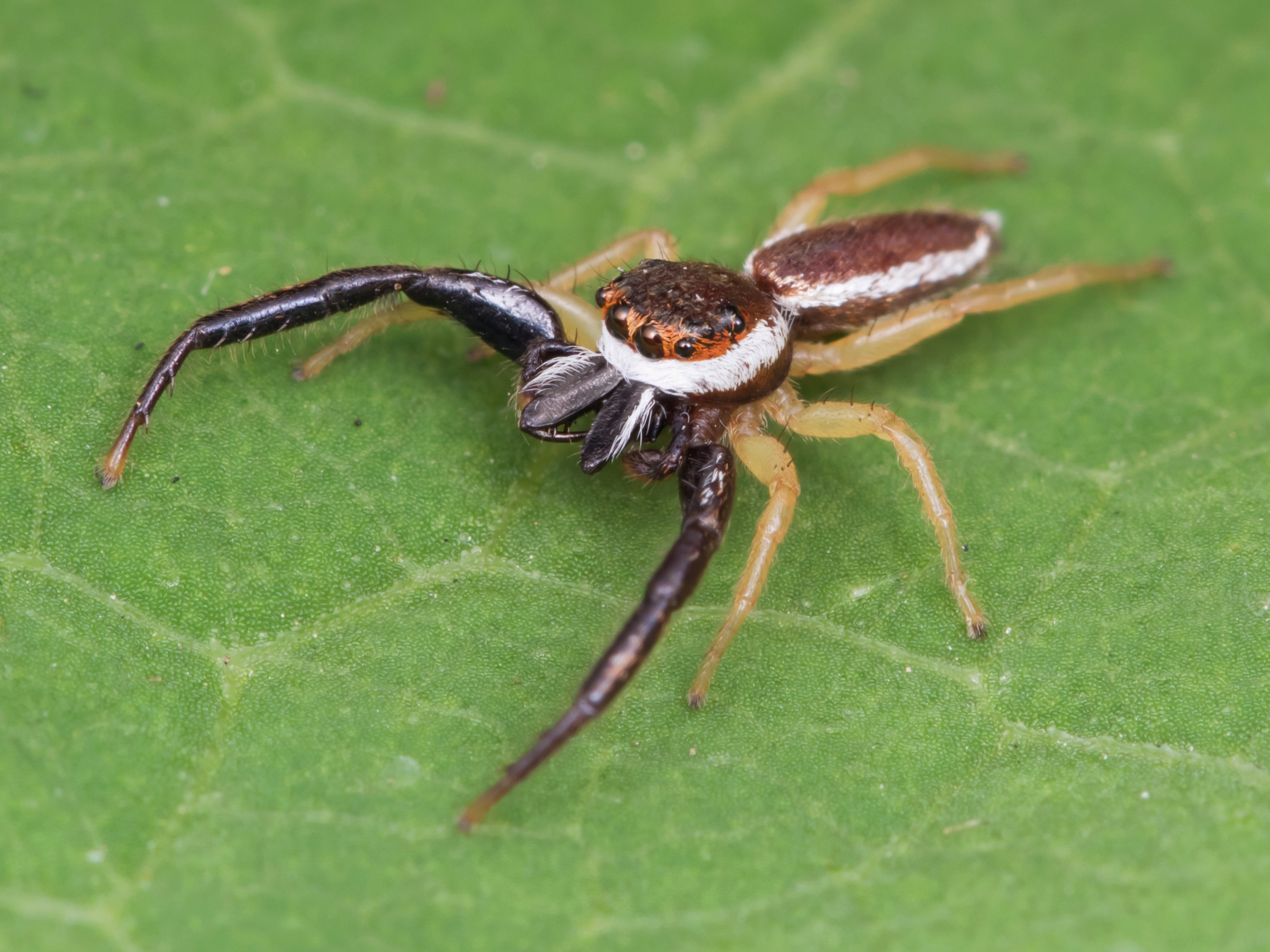
- Male

Scientific classification
- Kingdom: Animalia
- Phylum: Arthropoda
- Subphylum: Chelicerata
- Class: Arachnida
- Order: Araneae
- Infraorder: Araneomorphae
- Family: Salticidae
- Genus: Hentzia
- Species: H. palmarum

Binomial name
- Hentzia palmarum (Hentz, 1832)

= Hentzia palmarum =

Species of spider

Hentzia palmarum, the common hentz jumper, is a species of jumping spider in the family Salticidae. It is found in North America, Bermuda, the Bahamas, and Cuba.

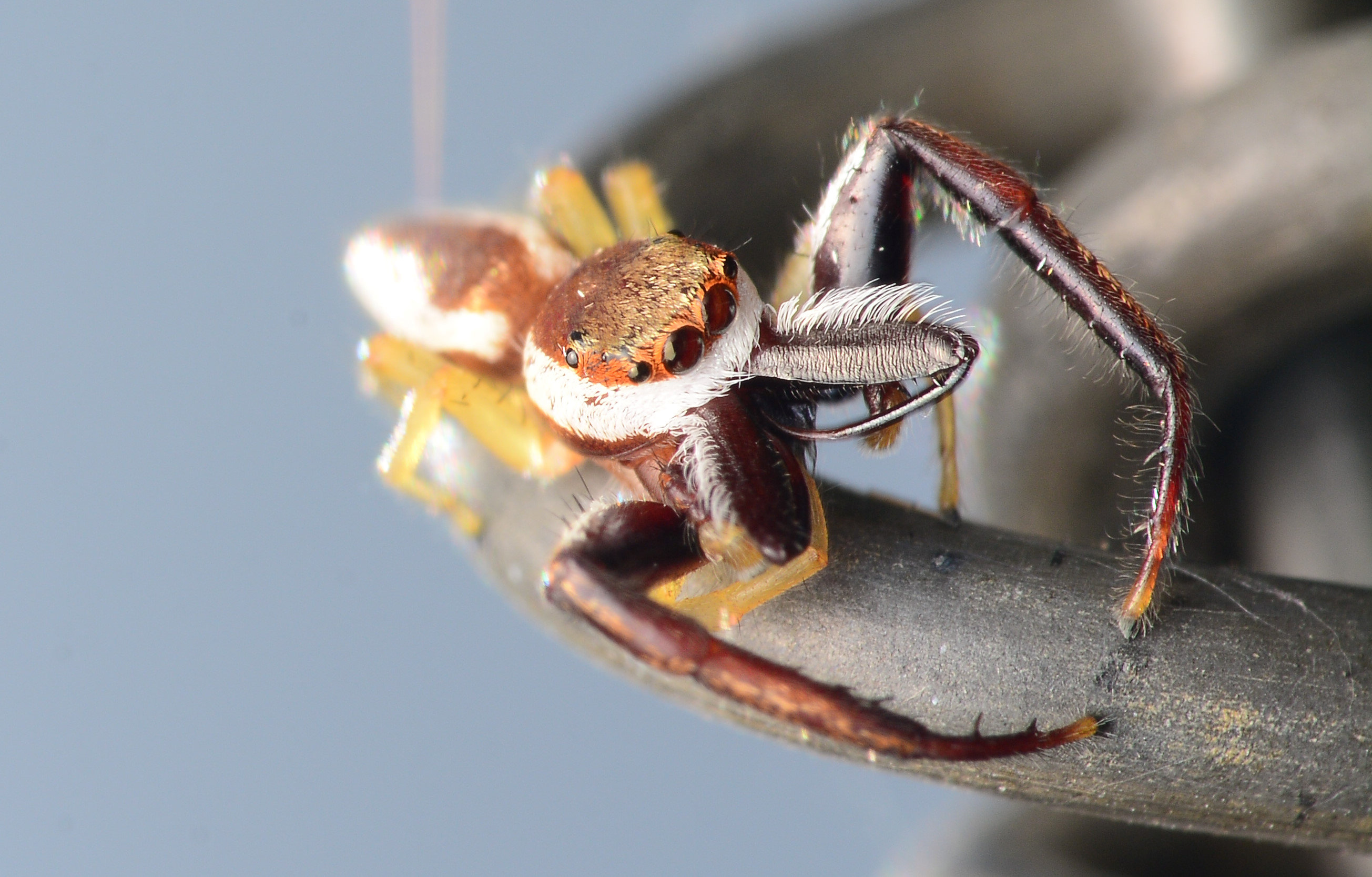
Adult male face

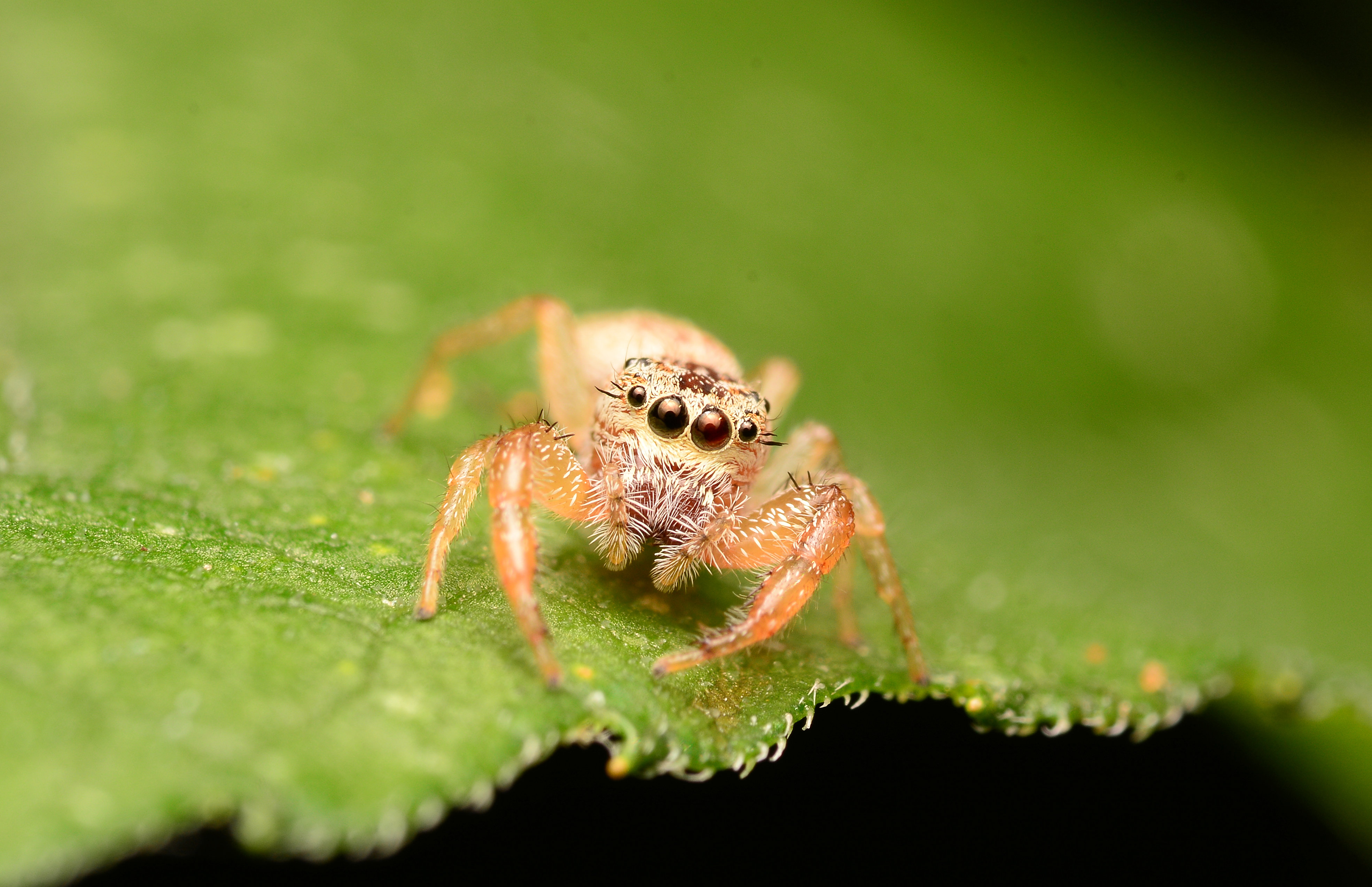
Adult female face

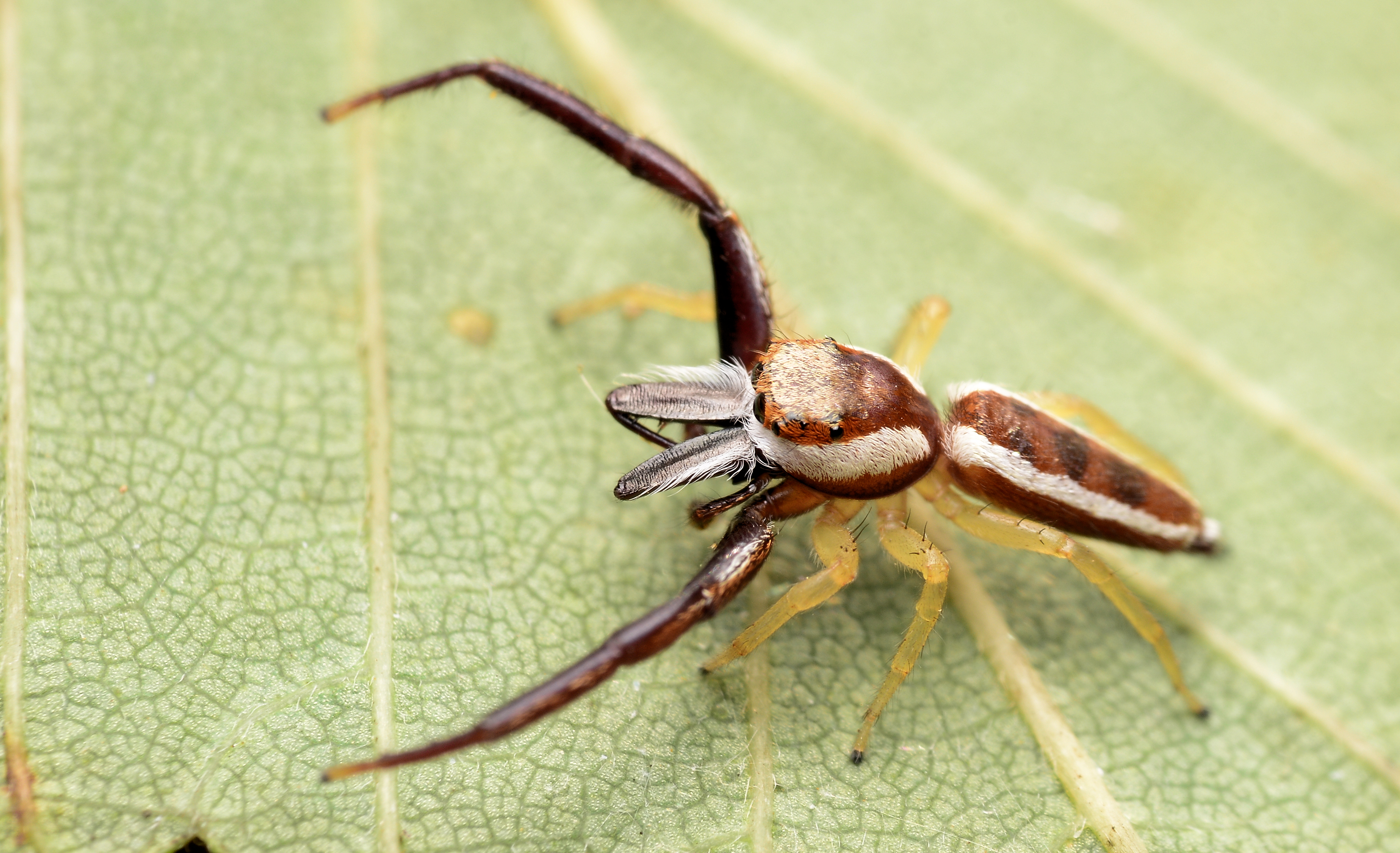
Adult male dorsal
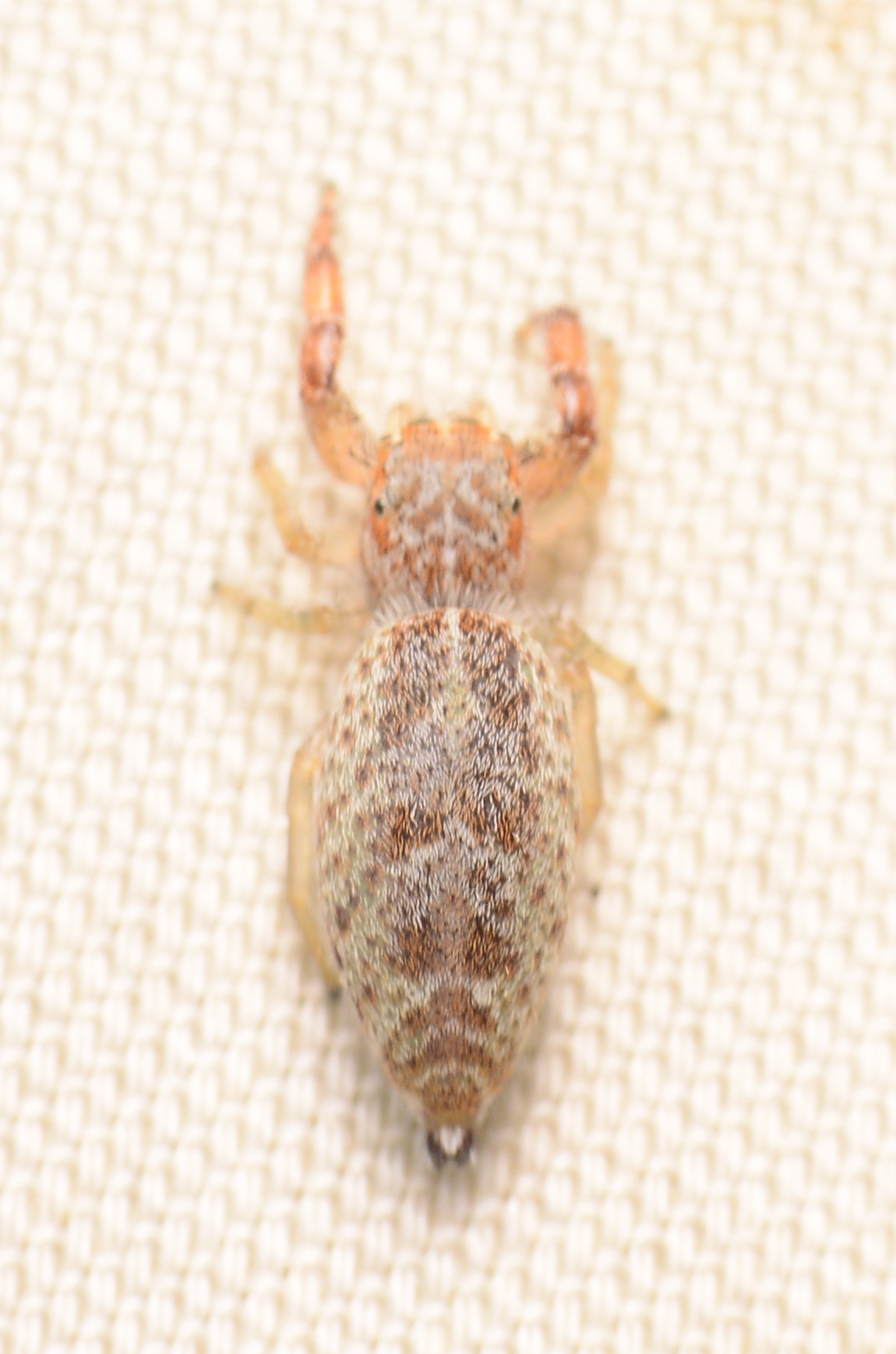
Adult female dorsal
