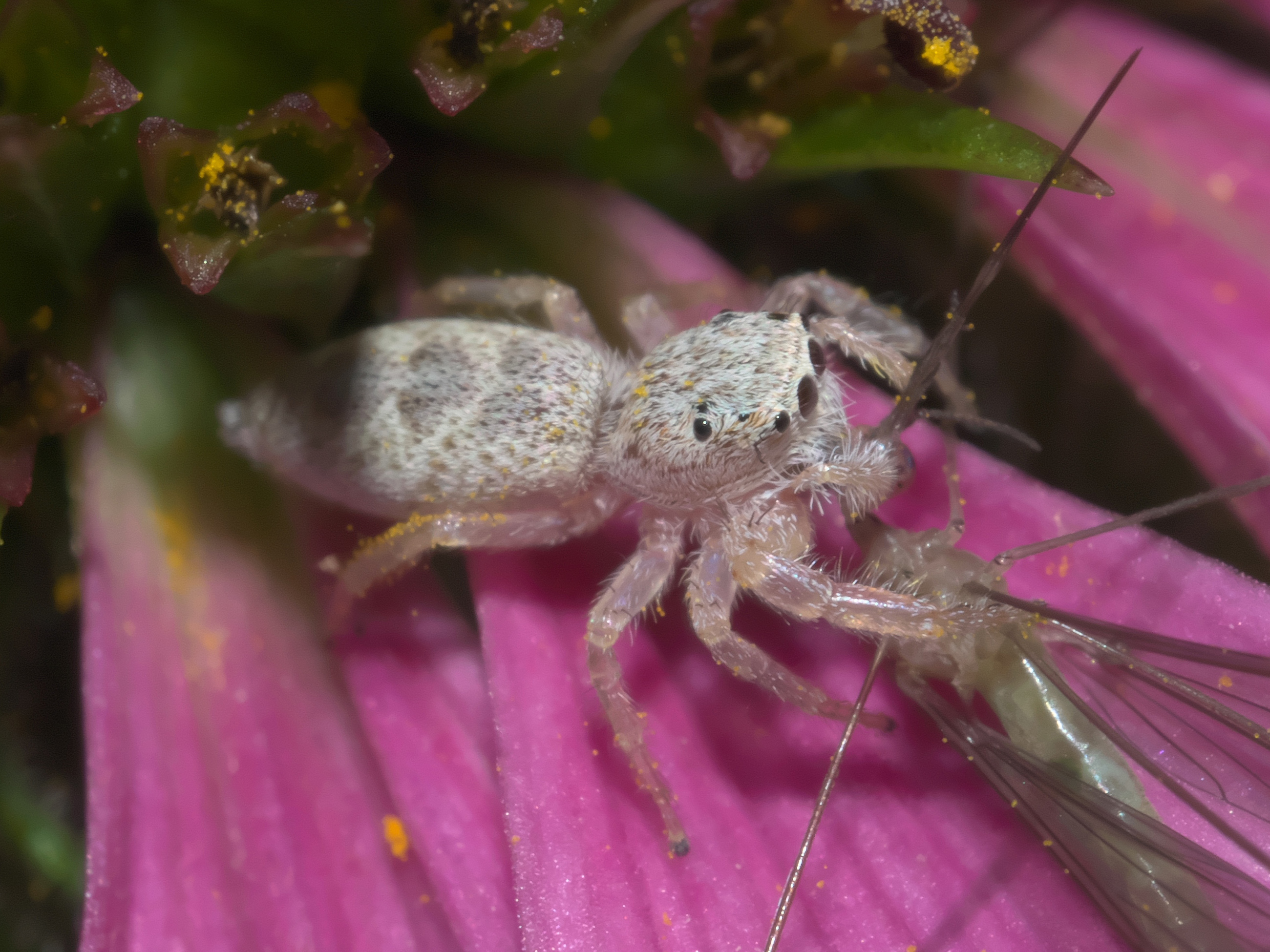
- Female
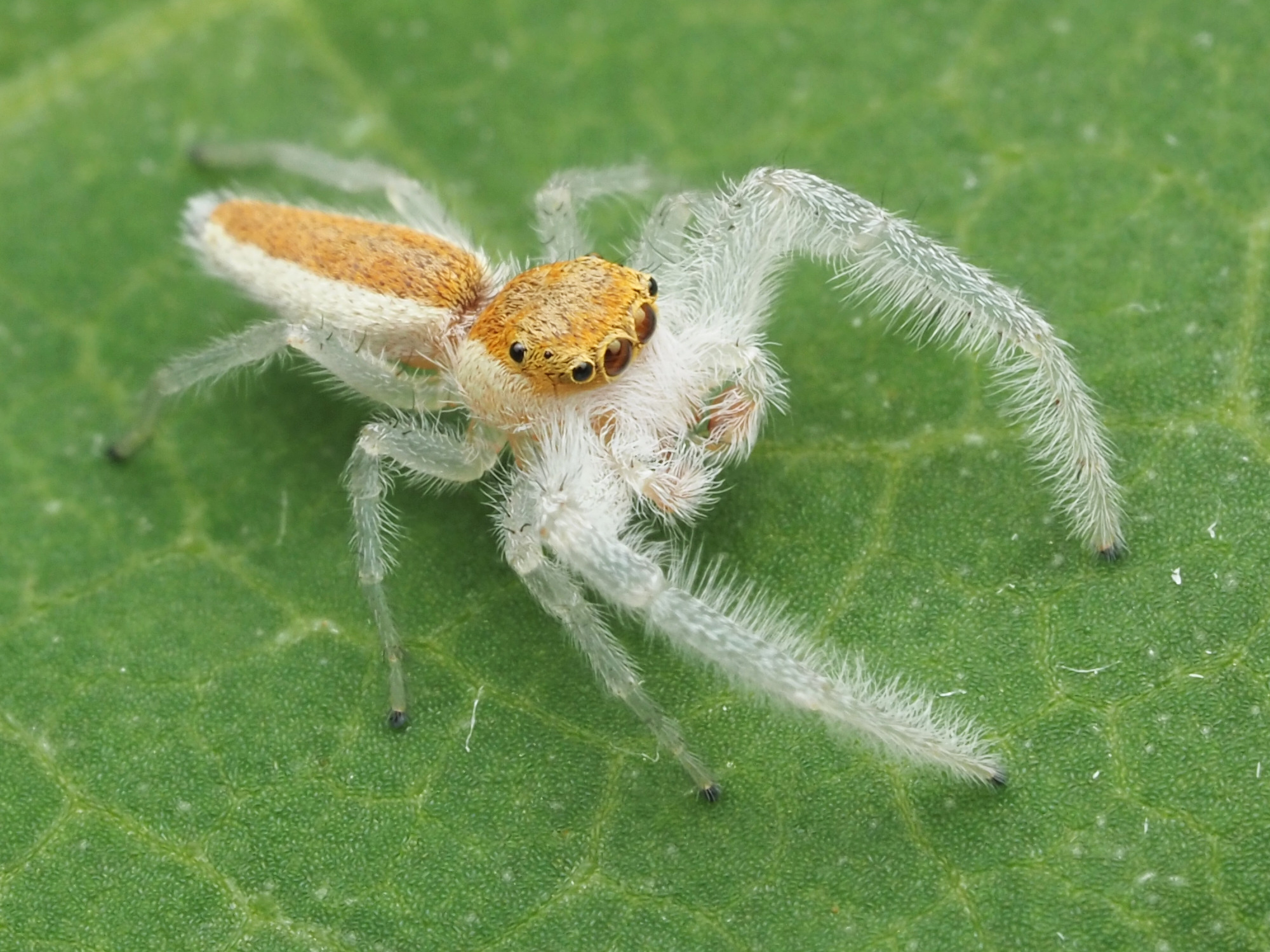
- Male

Scientific classification
- Kingdom: Animalia
- Phylum: Arthropoda
- Subphylum: Chelicerata
- Class: Arachnida
- Order: Araneae
- Infraorder: Araneomorphae
- Family: Salticidae
- Genus: Hentzia
- Species: H. mitrata

Binomial name
- Hentzia mitrata (Hentz, 1846)

Synonyms
- Attus mitratus Hentz, 1846; Attus morigerus Hentz, 1846; Maevia sulphurea C. L. Koch, 1846; Maevia pallida C. L. Koch, 1846; Icius mitratus (Hentz, 1846); Anoka mitrata (Hentz, 1846); Wala mitrata (Hentz, 1846)

= Hentzia mitrata =

White-jawed jumping spider

Species of spider

Hentzia mitrata, the white-jawed jumping spider is a species of jumping spider in the genus Hentzia. It is found in Canada, the United States, and the Bahamas.

== Taxonomy ==
The species was first described by Nicholas Marcellus Hentz in 1846 as Attus mitratus. The specific name mitrata is Latin meaning "wearing a mitre" or "capped", likely referring to the distinctive coloration pattern on the cephalothorax.

The species has a complex taxonomic history with multiple synonyms. Hentz also described the female as Attus morigerus in the same 1846 publication, not recognizing it as the same species. Carl Ludwig Koch described both Maevia sulphurea and Maevia pallida in 1846, which were later determined to be synonyms. The species was transferred to the genus Hentzia by Chickering in 1944.

== Distribution ==
H. mitrata is widely distributed across eastern North America. It ranges from southeastern Canada through much of the eastern United States, extending westward to Nebraska. The species has also been recorded from the Bahamas.

== Description ==
Female

Male

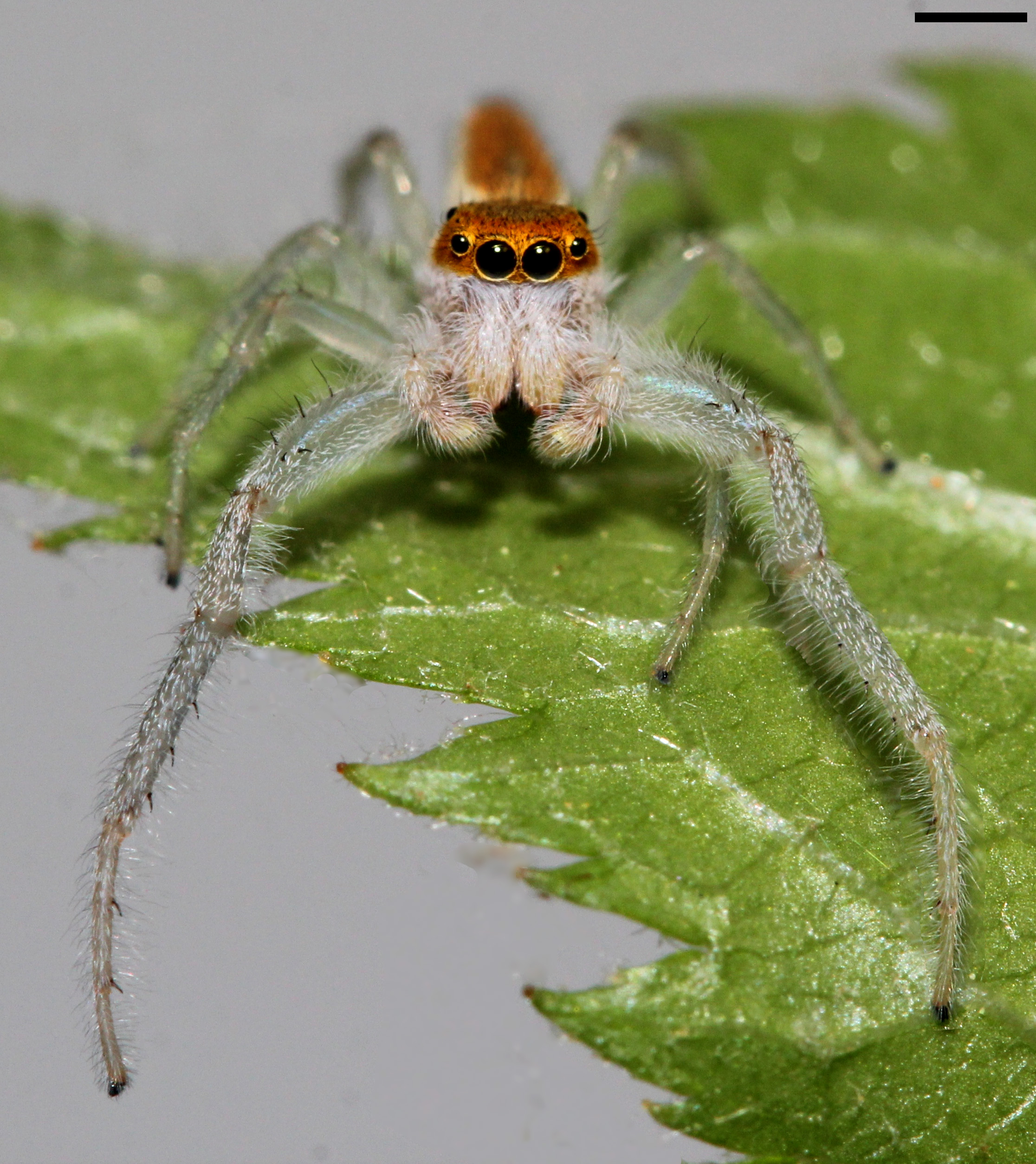
Male

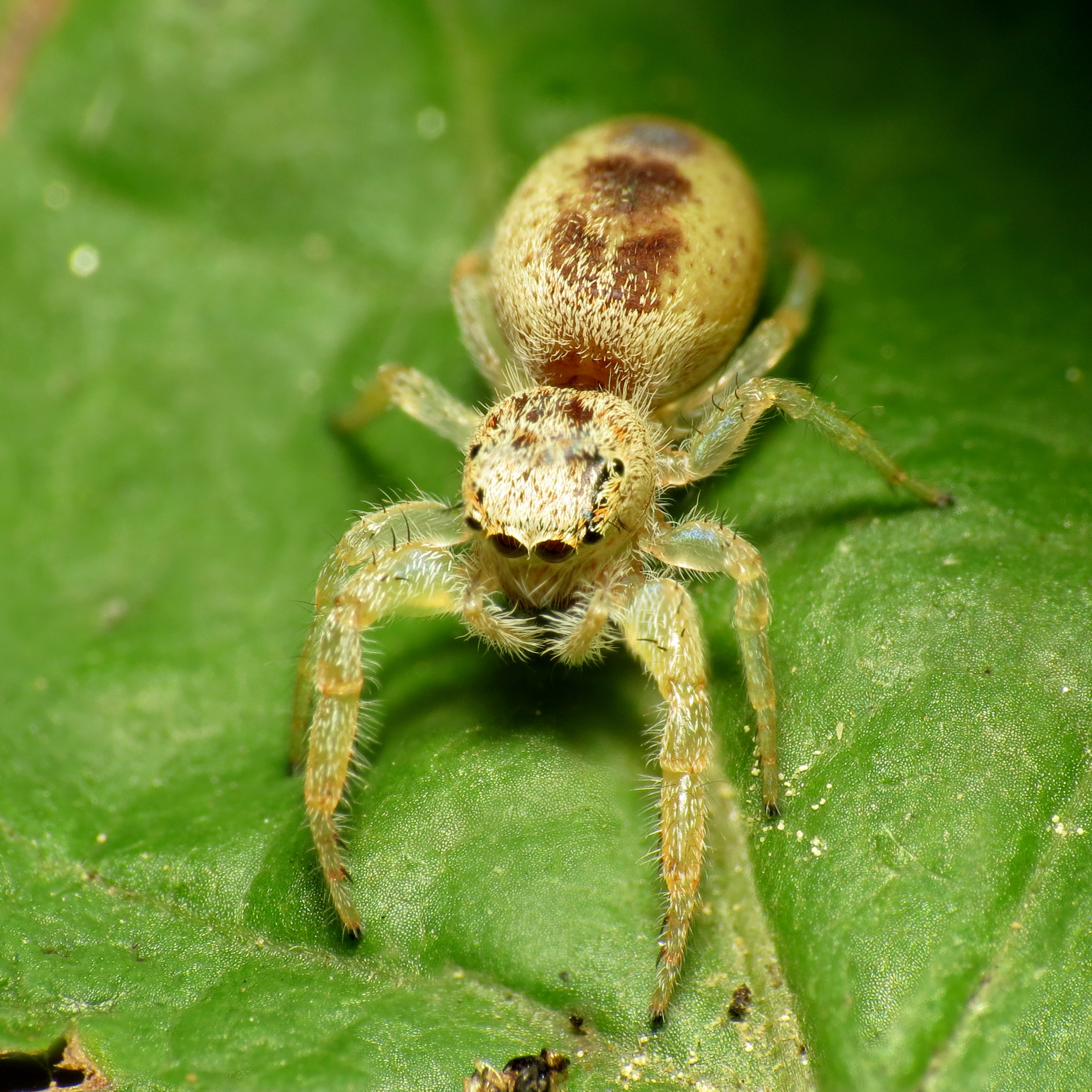
Female

Females of H. mitrata are slightly larger than males, measuring about 5.0 mm in body length compared to males at approximately 4.5 mm.

Both sexes share similar coloration patterns. The opisthosoma is reddish brown dorsally with three pairs of brown spots, while laterally it shows alternating yellowish and reddish narrow stripes. Ventrally, there are four narrow light-colored broken stripes surrounded by light reddish areas.

=== Female ===
The female has a distinctive epigyne with a small opening marked by a recurved crescentic margin and an inconspicuous curved anterior border. The cephalothorax is longer than wide, somewhat flattened, with a reddish brown coloration throughout the ocular region extending to the posterior margin. The lateral sides and clypeus are yellowish white.

=== Male ===
The male has a leg formula of 1423, with the first pair being much the longest and fringed with many white hairs. The pedipalps are distinctive, with the patella about equal in length to the tibia, and the tarsus much broader anteriorly than at the base, featuring a conspicuous twisted tube structure. The chelicerae are vertical and of moderate size, with the fang groove containing two slender promarginal teeth and a single retromarginal tooth.
