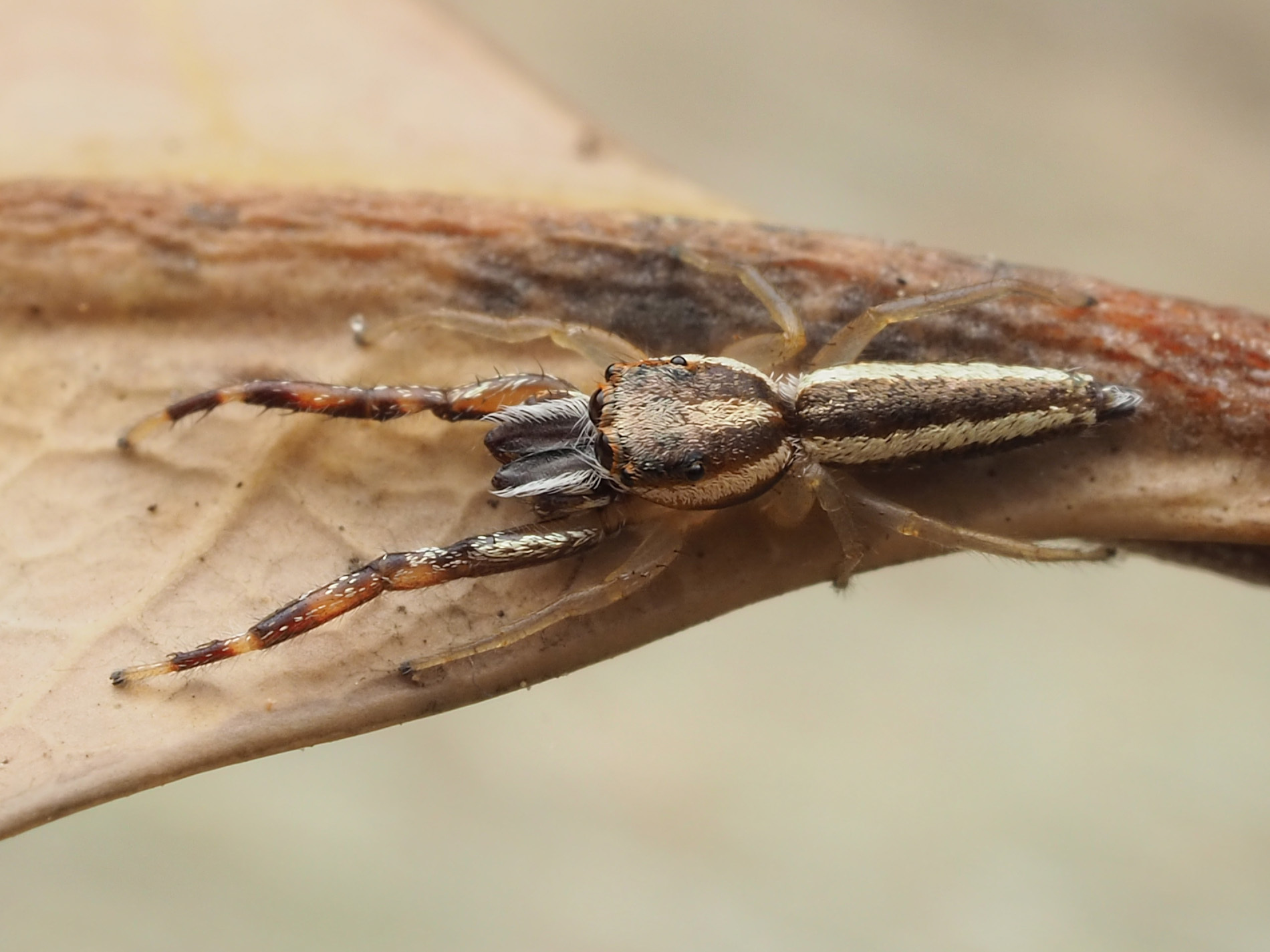
- Male
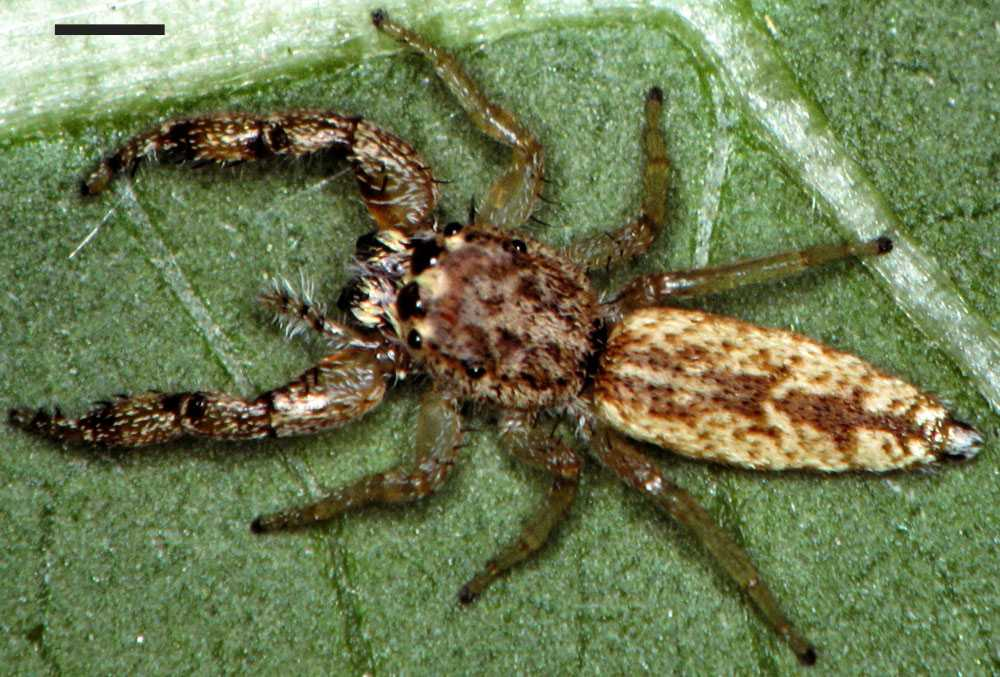
- Female

Scientific classification
- Kingdom: Animalia
- Phylum: Arthropoda
- Subphylum: Chelicerata
- Class: Arachnida
- Order: Araneae
- Infraorder: Araneomorphae
- Family: Salticidae
- Genus: Hentzia
- Species: H. grenada

Binomial name
- Hentzia grenada (Peckham & Peckham, 1894)

= Hentzia grenada =

Species of spider

Hentzia grenada is a species of jumping spider. It is found in Florida and south Georgia in the United States.
