= A Small Killing =

1991 graphic novel by Alan Moore

- Cover of the Dark Horse edition of A Small Killing
- Date: 1991
- Page count: 96 pages
- Publisher: VG Graphics; Dark Horse Comics; Avatar Press

Creative team
- Writer: Alan Moore
- Artist: Oscar Zárate

Original publication
- Published in: VG Graphics
- Date of publication: 1991
- ISBN: 0-575-04747-X

A Small Killing is a graphic novel by Alan Moore, published in 1991. It was illustrated by Oscar Zárate. The book has been published by a number of companies and in 2003 it was reprinted by Avatar Press.

== Publication history ==
The graphic novel has been released a number of times:

- A Small Killing:
  - VG Graphics, 96 pages, 1991, paperback, ISBN 0-575-05023-3, hardback, ISBN 0-575-04747-X
  - Dark Horse Comics, 96 pages, 1993, paperback ISBN 1-878574-45-0
  - Avatar Press, 104 pages, 2003, paperback, ISBN 1-59291-009-2, hardcover, ISBN 1-59291-010-6

== Plot summary ==
A Small Killing is a novel which looks inward, examining the images of one man's inner world. The protagonist is an ad company executive looking for inspiration for his latest project. This character is rather the apotheosis of 1980s culture and serves as commentary of it. Seeking inspiration for the above-mentioned project he returns to his home town to confront his perceptions of the past and himself.

== Awards ==
- 1994: Won "Best Graphic Album--New" Eisner Award
