= Dick Arnall =

British animation producer (1944–2007)

- Arnall in 1982
- Born: 14 July 1944; Sunderland, England
- Died: 6 February 2007 (aged 62); London, England
- Education: Queens' College, Cambridge
- Occupation: Animation producer
- Years active: 1965–2007
- Spouse: Marjut Rimminen
- Website: dickarnall.com

Dick Arnall (14 July 1944 – 6 February 2007) was a British animation producer. While an undergraduate at Cambridge he organised and directed the Cambridge Animation Festival in 1967 and 1968, the UK's first animation festival. He was assistant managing director of Halas and Batchelor from 1969 to 1972. From 1986 he produced independent short films, two of which were nominated for the BAFTA Award for Best Short Animation.

From 1990 Arnall produced animate!, a scheme run by the Arts Council of Great Britain and Channel 4 to commission animation from artists. In a 2005 essay, "Death to Animation", he argued that the word "animation" had come to mean family cartoons and proposed "the extended moving image" in its place.

== Early life and education ==
Arnall was born in Sunderland. His father was a design engineer and his mother taught domestic science. He went to Monkwearmouth Grammar School and in 1963 to Queens' College, Cambridge, where he read natural sciences, specialising in metallurgy.

== Cambridge ==
Arnall was president of the Cambridge University Film Society. In 1966 he invited Alfred Hitchcock to speak to the society; the playwright David Hare, then a student, later wrote about spending the afternoon before the talk with Hitchcock.

The first festival he organised, the British Animation Festival, ran from 2 to 7 November 1965 at Queens' College and the Lady Mitchell Hall, presented by the film society with the Cambridge Animation Group. He directed the Cambridge Animation Festival in 1967 and 1968, with the support of the City of Cambridge. He later wrote that he chose the word "animation" for its name "to signpost a defiance of Disney's cultural hegemony". The programmes included the films of Len Lye, who came from New York to speak in 1968. According to the International Film Guide of 1968 it was "by far the most original, exciting and creative film festival ever staged in the British Isles".

A third festival, planned for 1969, did not take place. Clare Kitson later wrote that the festival "had expired after two distinguished editions under Dick Arnall's leadership". It was restarted in 1979 by a group that included Arnall, with Antoinette Moses as director.

== Halas and Batchelor ==
Arnall worked on George Dunning's Yellow Submarine (1968). From 1969 to 1972 he was assistant managing director of Halas and Batchelor. There he produced early films by Paul Vester, Geoff Dunbar and Gillian Lacey, among them Vester's Football Freaks, and ran the studio's work on the Jackson 5ive and The Osmonds series for the American network ABC. When Peter Lord and David Sproxton, who went on to found Aardman Animations, asked the studio to show them how cartoons were made, Arnall spent an afternoon taking them through the process. At the Mamaia animation festival in Romania in 1970 he met the Finnish animator Marjut Rimminen, whom he later married.

== Independent producer ==
Between 1986 and 2001 Arnall produced ten short films. The first was Rimminen's I'm Not a Feminist, But... (1986). Tim Webb's animated documentary A Is for Autism (1992) was made for a Channel 4 season on disability.

In the mid-1990s Arnall "had felt for some time that many animated shorts suffered from weak scripts" and proposed a new scheme to bring animators together with writers. One result was Ruth Lingford's Pleasures of War, made with the novelist Sara Maitland, which was later chosen as one of the 150 films in Film: The Critics' Choice (2001). He also produced Lingford's Death and the Mother (1997), drawn on an Amiga computer, and Jo Ann Kaplan's Anatomy of Melancholy (2000). Robert Bradbrook met Arnall through animate!, and Arnall became the producer of his Home Road Movies (2001).

A Is for Autism and Home Road Movies were both nominated for the BAFTA Award for Best Short Animation, in 1993 and 2002, with Arnall among the named nominees.

== animate! ==
animate! was conceived by David Curtis, the Arts Council's officer for artists' film and video, and Clare Kitson, Channel 4's commissioning editor for animation, after discussions with the producer Keith Griffiths. When it began in 1990, Kitson wrote, choosing its production adviser "was easily settled. Dick Arnall was our unanimous choice." He held the post until 1998 and saw 35 films through to completion. Jez Stewart's history of British animation for the British Film Institute describes him as "the scheme's production advisor and guiding light", who worked to support a wide variety of film-makers and styles. In 1999 Creation magazine voted him top producer in its "50 Hottest Names in British Animation".

Under Arnall the animate! scheme added an international award for artists, screenings and exhibitions, and a website and archive, animateonline.org. After his death it was renamed Animate Projects.

== Writing ==
In 1968 he wrote "The Future of Animation" for Film, the magazine of the British Federation of Film Societies. In August 2005 Arnall published "Death to Animation" on the animate! website, reprinted by Vertigo in 2007. He argued that the word "animation" meant character-driven entertainment for families, which left artists without a name for their animated work. He proposed "the extended moving image" as an alternative. Stewart calls it "a combative 2005 essay". With Gareth Evans he wrote "Build It and They Will Come: animate! and the Extended Imagination", a history of the scheme, for The Animate! Book (2006).

== Personal life and death ==
Arnall and Rimminen had one son. He died in London on 6 February 2007, at the age of 62.

== Legacy ==
Tribute screenings were held in April 2007 at the Cambridge Arts Picture House and the Institute of Contemporary Arts in London. The Dick Arnall Award, "for rogue vision in the manipulated moving image", was first given at the Aurora festival in Norwich in November 2007, organised by Animate Projects, the Royal College of Art and the National Film and Television School. The first winner was Jean-Gabriel Périot's 200,000 Phantoms. In 2024 the London International Animation Festival held a tribute programme, Magic in Marimekko, curated by Gareth Evans.

The University for the Creative Arts holds the Dick Arnall Animation Archive, 33 boxes on artist-made animation in Britain and Europe from the early 1960s to the late 2000s, including the Cambridge festival and animate!.

== Selected productions ==
- I'm Not a Feminist, But... (1986), directed by Marjut Rimminen
- A Is for Autism (1992), directed by Tim Webb; BAFTA nomination, 1993
- Death and the Mother (1997), directed by Ruth Lingford
- Pleasures of War, directed by Ruth Lingford
- Anatomy of Melancholy (2000), directed by Jo Ann Kaplan
- Home Road Movies (2001), directed by Robert Bradbrook; BAFTA nomination, 2002
