= Jo Nesbitt =

British illustrator, translator, and cartoonist

Jo Nesbitt is a British illustrator, translator, and cartoonist. Most of her work focuses on queer women's issues and experiences.

== Career ==
=== Comics ===
Nesbitt's comics and illustrations have been featured in feminist and queer works such as Dyke Strippers, Gay Left Issue, and HERizons. Nesbitt also worked with the Sisterwrite bookshop on multiple occasions, helping them set up the shop and creating cartoons for their catalogue. Nesbitt's The Desperate Woman's Guide to Diet and Exercise is a comedic commentary on women's dietary practices as influenced by Western culture.

=== Translation ===
Nesbit translated I Have Heard about You: Foreign Women’s Writing Crossing the Dutch Border by Suzanna van Dijk from Dutch to English.

=== Other work ===
Nesbitt worked on book 1 of Sourcream with Liz Mackie, Christine Roche, and Lesley Ruda.

Nesbitt's The Modern Ladies' Compendium was published by Virago in 1986; it is a comedy aimed at women that pokes fun at gender norms. The Great Escape of Doreen Potts is one of Nesbitt's works for younger readers published in 1981.

She also contributed to Menstrual Taboos by the Matriarchy Study Group along with Pauline Long, Monica Sjöö, Marie Lecko, Mary Ooghill, Pat Whiting, and Mary Coghill. Carol Lee described Nesbitt's writing in it as having "anger" and "illuminating power."

Nesbitt illustrated the article "A Feminist Sexual Politics" by Beatrix Campbell in Feminist Review 5. A critic of the article wrote: "It is gloriously illustrated by Jo Nesbitt, who manages to keep you laughing rather than crying as you struggle through this piece." She also illustrated Sheila Kitzinger's book Birth Over 35. She co-illustrated Second Class Disabled by Irene Loach and Ruth Lister, with Sam Smith.

Nesbitt was part of the London Cartoon Museum's The Inking Woman exhibition in 2017.

== Personal life ==
Nesbitt was born in Tyneside, England in the 1950s. Through her childhood years, she attended a Christian school for girls run by nuns, and religious themes and imagery appear in her work often. In subsequent years, she got a degree in English from the University of London. Nesbitt moved to Amsterdam in 1982.
