= Hentzia alamosa =

Scientific classification
- Kingdom: Animalia
- Phylum: Arthropoda
- Subphylum: Chelicerata
- Class: Arachnida
- Order: Araneae
- Infraorder: Araneomorphae
- Family: Salticidae
- Genus: Hentzia
- Species: H. alamosa

Binomial name
- Hentzia alamosa Richman, 2010

Species of spider

Hentzia alamosa is a species of jumping spider in the family Salticidae. It is only known from Texas in the United States.
