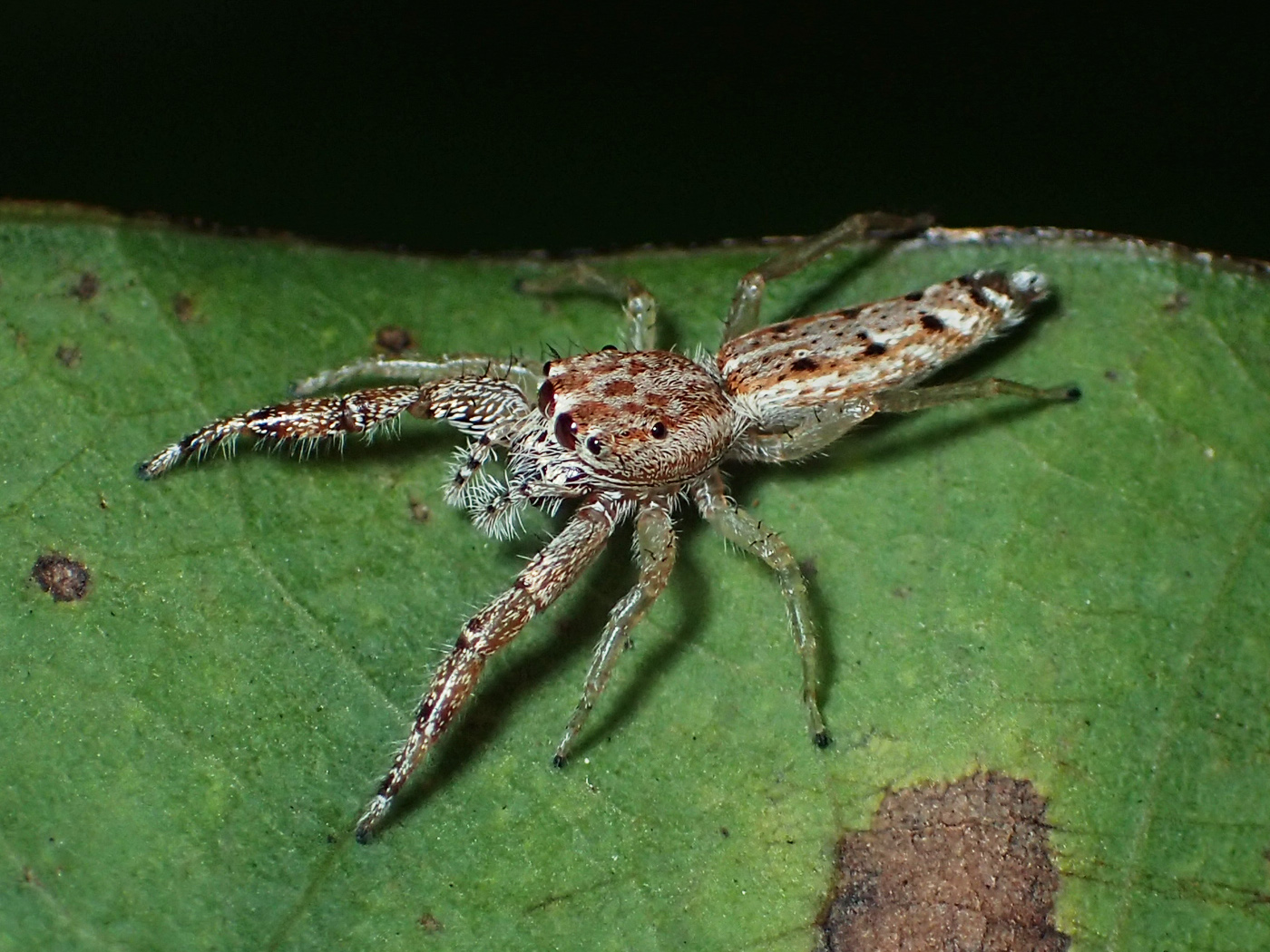
- Female in Miami, Florida

Scientific classification
- Kingdom: Animalia
- Phylum: Arthropoda
- Subphylum: Chelicerata
- Class: Arachnida
- Order: Araneae
- Infraorder: Araneomorphae
- Family: Salticidae
- Genus: Hentzia
- Species: H. chekika

Binomial name
- Hentzia chekika Richman, 1989

= Hentzia chekika =

Species of spider

Hentzia chekika is a species of jumping spider in the family Salticidae. It is found in the United States, Bahama Islands, and Cuba.
