= Marjut Rimminen =

Marjut Rimminen (born 1944) is a Finnish-born animator and film director living and working in London.

Rimminen studied graphic design at the Helsinki College of Applied Arts and graduated in 1968. She started making animated television commercials, one of which was named the Best Commercial at the 1972 Animafest Zagreb. The following year Marjut joined Halas & Batchelor Animation in the United Kingdom, and has lived and worked in London ever since.

Marjut Rimminen has made short films for Channel Four Television as well as directed and animated TV spots for the Finnish advertising market. Her work has been screened at numerous film festivals around the world, and she has been member in several festival juries.

Marjut Rimminen has given tuition at the National Film & Television School, the Royal College of Art and the Institute of Art & Design in Surrey. She has given master classes and workshops in animation around the world.

Rimminen was married to British animation producer Dick Arnall (1944–2007).

A retrospective of Rimminen's work was screened at the 1998 Tampere Film Festival, Finland, and the 9th International Festival of Animated Film in Stuttgart, Germany.

== Filmography ==
- 1972 Trip to Eternity, with Sakari Rimminen, 3 min, 16mm
  - honourable mention, 1973 Lübeck Film Festival
- 1982 The Bridge, drawn animation, 8 mins, 35mm
  - Finnish State Film Award 1983
- 1986 I'm not a Feminist, but… Channel 4 co-production with Christine Roche, 7 mins, 35mm
  - Special Jury Prize, 1986 Espinho International Animation Festival
- 1987 Blind Justice – Some Protection for Channel 4, 9 mins, 16mm
- 1989 The Frog King, 7 mins, 35mm
  - Winner, Magic Mirror animated fairy-tale competition
- 1991 The Stain, with Christine Roche, 11 mins, 16mm
  - Special Jury Prize, 1992 Hiroshima International Animation Festival
  - Special Jury Prize, 1992 San Francisco International Film Festival
- 1996 Many Happy Returns for Channel Four Television, 8min23s
  - Grand Prix, 1997 Tampere International Short Film Festival
  - 2nd prize for Best Computer Assisted Animation by Independent,

1997 Los Angeles World Animation Celebration

  - Jury special prize, 1997 Kraków International Short Film Festival
  - The Grand Animation Prize, 1997 Vila do Conde Short Film Festival
  - Diploma, 1997 Krok International Animation Festival
  - First prize, 1997 Fantoche International Animation Festival
  - Honorary distinction for the Best Animation, 1997 Drama International Short Film Festival
  - Finalist, 1998 British Animation Awards
  - Director's Choice Award for the Most Innovative Animation Work, the Images Festival of Independent Film and Video 1998, Toronto, Canada
- 1996 Absolut Panushka. Interpretations on the classic Absolut Vodka bottle by 24 award-winning animators around the world, 10 seconds each
  - Joop Geesing Prize for the Best Campaign, Holland Animation Film Festival, 1996
  - Best animation produced for the internet, 1997 Los Angeles World Animation Celebration
  - Finalist, Cool Design Award, in 1997 Cool Site of the Year Competition
  - Honorary mention, 1997 Communications Art Interactive Design Annual
- 1996 Urpo & Turpo, with Liisa Helminen, 6 x 9 mins, 35mm
  - The Bronze Elephant, 1997 Hyderabad Children's Film Festival, India
  - Finalist, Best Film & Best Soundtrack, 1988 British Animation Awards
- 1998 Mixed Feelings for Channel Four, 12 mins, BetaSP
- 2001 Red Ribbon AIDS/HIV episode for UNICEF, 1 min, Digibeta
- 2007 Learned by Heart (Sydämeen kätketty) for Yleisradio
