= Glenn Thompson (publisher) =

American publisher (1940–2001)

- Born: September 24, 1940 Harlem, New York City, New York, United States of America
- Died: September 7, 2001 (aged 60) London, UK
- Areas: Publisher and activist
- Notable works: Centerprise; Writers and Readers Cooperative
- Spouses: Margaret Gosley; Sian Williams
- Children: Shoshannah, Benjamin, Elisha

Glenn Thompson (September 24, 1940 – September 7, 2001) was an American book publisher and activist. Born in Harlem, New York, he moved in 1968 to England, where he began a community-based bookshop called Centerprise in Hackney, East London, and went on to co-found in 1976 the Writers and Readers Cooperative, best known as publisher of the ...For Beginners series of documentary graphic nonfiction books.

== Biography ==
Glenn Thompson was born on September 24, 1940, to Clara Belle and George Joseph Thompson, in Harlem, New York. Glenn was raised in the Bedford-Stuyvesant neighborhood of Brooklyn. His mother died when he was 13 and shortly thereafter his truck-driver father left the family. Glenn and his younger brother Dennis Thompson (born 1942) were picked up by the welfare department and sent to a children's shelter. After only a couple of weeks Glenn was moved to another location and the brothers were separated.

Thompson did not learn to read until the age of 12, and left school when he was just turning 14, but he continued to educate himself by reading voraciously. He signed on to work on a freighter when he was 20, thus buying passage to North Africa. For the next few years, he travelled around North Africa, Europe, the Middle East, and South Asia. He worked for two years on an Israeli kibbutz.

Arriving in England in 1968, Thompson leveraged his street kid background to get legal employment as a social worker in the East London borough of Hackney. In 1970, he began a community-based bookshop, with his first wife Margaret Gosley, and a publishing and social services cooperative called Centerprise, which operated until 2012. The first publication by Centerprise was a book of poetry by a 12-year-old boy named Vivian Usherwood, which sold 18,000 copies.

Thompson worked for Penguin Education for a time, and then, in 1976, with his second wife Sian Williams, and like-minded friends John Berger, Lisa Appignanesi, Richard Appignanesi, Arnold Wesker and Chris Searle, Thompson founded the Writers and Readers Cooperative to publish books, with authors including Tony Medina, Suheir Hammad, Safiya Henderson-Holmes, and Asha Bandele, as well as Huey P. Newton. Until the mid-1980s, the Cooperative also operated a London bookshop at 144 Camden High Street. Writers and Readers' most successful and long-lived publishing venture was the ...For Beginners series of documentary comic books on complex topics, starting with the first title, Cuba for Beginners and covering subjects from Freud and Marx to Elvis Presley and DNA. A rift in the Cooperative resulted from one of the members issuing the U.S. rights to several of the Beginners series to Pantheon Books, and the cooperative disbanded in 1984.

Following this rift, in 1987 Thompson took over as sole publisher and moved back to his hometown of New York City to establish a legal foothold and prevent any further copyright infringement of titles; the U.S. imprint was known as Writers and Readers Publishing, Inc., and was based in Harlem. In moving the company to Harlem, his goal was to stimulate a new Harlem Renaissance by creating an international publishing house there. He started two new imprints: Harlem River Press, publishing children's poetry, and Black Butterfly Children's Books, books for the inner-city child. Thompson's London-based company, formally established in 1992, was known as Writers and Readers Limited. For the balance of his life, Thompson moved back and forth between New York City and London.

For years, Thompson spent his time traveling between England and New York to manage the two companies.

=== Death ===
Thompson died of cancer in London on September 7, 2001, leaving three children and two grandchildren.

== Legacy ==
In 2007, a consortium of investors revived the For Beginners series under the name For Beginners, LLC; the new company has reprinted previous books in the series, and has promised to publish between six and nine new issues each year.
