= Christine Roche =

French-Canadian illustrator, cartoonist, teacher and film-maker

- Born: 1939 (age 86–87)
- Occupations: Illustrator, cartoonist, teacher, filmmaker
- Website: www.christineroche.co.uk/index.html

Christine Roche (born 1939) is a French-Canadian illustrator, cartoonist, teacher and film-maker who lives and works in London. Her work has appeared in several books, magazines, and national newspapers. She is currently a painter.

== Biography ==
Christine Roche has illustrated many books, both for children and adults, and worked for a number of leading publishers. She has produced animated films for Channel 4 and UNICEF, and lectured in various colleges including the London College of Communication, the Royal College of Art and the National Institute of Design (NID) in India.

Roche cartooned for the publication Spare Rib before co-founding and self-publishing Sourcream in 1979 with Jo Nesbitt, Liz Mackie and Lesley Ruda. More underground British women cartoonists became involved in Sourcream No. 2, which was published in 1981 by the Sheba Feminist Press in paperback.

Roche joined a number of collectives, including the Kids Book Group, and the Hackney Flashers collective of feminist photographers that started in the 1970s and produced exhibitions on "Women at Work" and "Who's Holding the Baby?".

She is author of I'm Not a Feminist But... (1985) which she made into an animated film with Marjut Rimminen.

She also co-directed the short animated films The Stain (1991) and Someone Must Be Trusted (1987).

In addition, she designed the characters in the children's television cartoon series Treasure

Her work appears in the anthology Funny Girls – Cartooning for Equality edited by Diane Atkinson (Penguin Books, 1997), and The Inking Woman: 250 Years of Women Cartoon and Comic Artists in Britain, edited by Nicola Streeten and Cath Tate (Myriad Editions, 2018).

== Bibliography ==
=== As author ===
- I'm Not a Feminist But... – Virago Press Ltd (1985): ISBN 978-0-86068-604-0

=== As illustrator ===
- How We Play (Anita Harper) – Viking Children's Books (1979): ISBN 978-0-7226-5481-1 (also: How We Work, How We Live and How We Feel)
- Sourcream (Jo Nesbitt, Lesley Ruda, Liz Mackie, Christine Roche) – Sheba Feminist Publishers (1980): ASIN B000U0OH90
- Sweet Freedom: Struggle for Women's Liberation (Anna Coote, Beatrix Campbell) – Picador (1982): ISBN 978-0-330-26511-9
- A Women's History of Sex (Harriett Gilbert) – Pandora Press (1987): ISBN 978-0-86358-142-7
- Abigail at the Beach (Felix Pirani) – Collins (1988): ISBN 0-00-184237-4
- Abigail Goes Visiting (Felix Pirani) – Collins (1990): ISBN 0-00-191368-9
- Triplets (Felix Pirani) – Viking Press (1991): ISBN 978-0-670-83375-7
- Pregnancy Book (Nancy Kohner, Angela Phillips) – Health Education Authority (1993): ISBN 978-1-85448-555-7
- The Universe for Beginners (Felix Pirani) – Icon Books Ltd (1994): ISBN 978-1-874166-06-1
- Give Your Baby a Head Start: How to Kick the Smoking Habit – Health Education Authority (1994): ISBN 978-0-7521-0016-6
- Women's Health Guide (Ann Furedi, Mary Tidyman) – Health Education Authority (1994) :ISBN 978-1-85448-992-0
- The Young Person's Guide to Saving the Planet (Bernadette Vallely, Debbie Silver) – Chivers Press (new edition 1990): ISBN 978-0-86220-870-7
- So Young, So Sad, So Listen (Philip Graham, Carol Hughes) – Gaskell (1995): ISBN 978-0-902241-80-0
- Pregnancy, Birth and the First Five Years (Nancy Kohner, Angela Phillips) – Health Education Authority (new edition 1995): ISBN 978-1-85448-997-5
- Pregnancy Book: A Complete Guide to Pregnancy, Childbirth and the First Few Weeks with a New Baby (Nancy Kohner, Angela Phillips) – Health Education Authority (3rd revised edition 1996): ISBN 978-0-7521-0761-5
- What Treasure Did Next (Gina Davidson) – Virago Press Ltd (1996): ISBN 978-1-86049-114-6
- Living with a Stranger (Valerie Stillwell) – Gaskell (1997): ISBN 978-1-901242-07-2
- Religion (What's the Big Idea?) (Anita Ganeri) – Hodder Children's Books (1998): ISBN 978-0-340-66719-4
- Nuclear Power (What's the Big Idea?) (Felix Pirani) – Hodder Children's Books (1998): ISBN 978-0-340-69339-1
- Drugs Centre Stage – volume one (Chris Scanlan) – LittleOctopus Publishing (2006): ISBN 978-0-9549169-1-6
- Drugs Centre Stage – volume two (Chris Scanlan) – LittleOctopus Publishing (2006): ISBN 978-0-9549169-2-3
- Introducing the Universe (Felix Pirani) – Icon Books Ltd (new edition 2006): ISBN 978-1-84046-761-1

=== As painter ===
- 2009: Morley Gallery
- 2009: Cafe Gallery
- 2010: Burgh House
- 2011: West Eleven Gallery
- 2011: Colour Gallery
- 2012: St. Martins in the Field
- 2012: Core Arts
- 2012: LCP (London Centre of Psychotherapy)
- 2014: St. Martins in the Field
- 2015: Islington Arts Society
- 2016: Islington Arts Society
- 2016: National Open Art (NOA)
- 2017: Royal Academy Summer Exhibition
- 2017: National Open Art (NOA)
- 2017: Ply Gallery

== Filmography ==
- The Stain (1991)
- Someone Must Be Trusted (1987) – one of a series of four short animated documentaries about Women and the Law
- I'm Not a Feminist But... (1985)
