= Hentzia elegans =

Scientific classification
- Kingdom: Animalia
- Phylum: Arthropoda
- Subphylum: Chelicerata
- Class: Arachnida
- Order: Araneae
- Infraorder: Araneomorphae
- Family: Salticidae
- Genus: Hentzia
- Species: H. elegans

Binomial name
- Hentzia elegans (Keyserling, 1885)

Synonyms
- Icius elegans Keyserling, 1885; Wala elegans (Keyserling, 1885)

Species of spider

Hentzia elegans is a species of jumping spider found in North America. The male holotype is housed at the University of Cambridge.
