= Einstein for Beginners =

1979 graphic study guide to Einstein by Joseph Schwartz

- First edition cover
- Author: Joseph Schwartz
- Illustrator: Michael McGuinness
- Language: English
- Series: For Beginners; Introducing...
- Subjects: Albert Einstein; Relativity
- Publisher: Writers & Readers; Pantheon Books; Icon Books
- Publication place: United Kingdom
- Media type: Print (Paperback)

Einstein for Beginners, republished as Introducing Einstein, is a 1979 graphic study guide to Albert Einstein and the theory of relativity written by Joseph Schwartz and illustrated by Michael McGuinness.

Leonardo reviewer Nan Conklin stated that the work is "not simply a book explaining Einstein's scientific work, but a mixture of history, politics and science." According to Science for the People reviewer Paul Thagard, "Einstein's work is related," in this book, "to the rise of electrical industries and the later development of the atomic bomb."

== Publication history ==
This volume was originally published in the United Kingdom by Writers and Readers Publishing Cooperative in 1979. It was republished in the US by Pantheon Books and in the UK by Icon Books.

=== Selected editions ===
- Einstein for Beginners. Writers & Readers. 1979. ISBN 0906386055.
- Einstein for Beginners. Pantheon Books. 1990. ISBN 0375714596.
- Einstein for Beginners. Icon Books. 1992. ISBN 1874166021.
- Introducing Einstein. Icon Books. 1999. ISBN 1840460601.
- Einstein for Beginners. Pantheon Books. 1990. ISBN 1874166021.
- Introducing Einstein. Icon Books. 2005. ISBN 1840466677.
- Introducing Einstein: A Graphic Guide. Icon Books. 2012. ISBN 978-1848314085.

=== Related volumes in the For Beginners series ===
- Manly, Steven L.; Fournier, Steven (2009). Relativity and Quantum Physics. Readers & Writers.

=== Related volumes in the Introducing... series ===
- Rankin, William (1993). Newton for Beginners. Icon Books. ISBN 1863734953.
- Felix, Pirani; Christina, Roche (1993). The Universe for Beginners. Icon Books. ISBN 1874166064.
- McEvoy, J.P.; Zárate, Oscar (1995). Stephen Hawking for Beginners. Icon Books.
- McEvoy, J.P.; Zárate, Oscar (1996). Quantum Theory for Beginners. Icon Books.
- Callender, Craig; Edney, Ralph (2001). Introducing Time. Icon Books.
- Bassett, Bruce; Edney, Ralph (2002). Introducing Relativity. Icon Books. ISBN 1840463724.
- Clegg, Brian; Pugh, Oliver (2012). Introducing Infinity. Icon Books.
- Whyntie, Tom; Pugh, Oliver (2013). Introducing Particle Physics. Icon Books.

== Reception ==
Paul Thagard, writing in Science for the People, describes the book as "intelligible and entertaining," while Henry McDonald, writing in The Washington Post, describes it as "well illustrated and thoroughly researched."

"Almost half the book," according to Nan Conklin, writing in Leonardo, "is devoted to recounting Einstein's early life and the influences on him." "Its discussion of the political environment in which Einstein's discoveries were made is," according to McDonald, "informative."

"The drawing and the words have a distinctly comic-book flavor," according to Conklin, but it is "only when the authors set out to explain Einstein's theories that the use of the peculiar mode of presentation seems justified." McDonald says that "the presentation of the discoveries themselves is little short of inspired," while Thagard too commends the authors as "highly inventive in using amusing illustrations and humorous asides to lead the beginners through difficult concepts."

While Conklin speculates that the publishers may have included a volume on Einstein in this series due to his belief in "the establishment of a socialist economy, accompanied by an educational system which would be oriented toward social goals," and McDonald confirms that the authors "go out of their way to emphasize [...] Einstein's socialism," Thagard is critical of the failure to "develop the social connections in a substantial way," and concludes that the volume does not provide a "basis for discussion of the role of science in society."
