= Bart Dickon =

Character created by Borin Van Loon

Bart Dickon is a character created by artist and writer Borin Van Loon. Dickon, styled as 'The Ideologically-Sound Secret Agent', first appeared in comic strip form in the British publication 'Brain Damage' (later 'The Damage') in the late eighties. This surrealist collage comic strip was entitled 'A Severed Head' (named after an Iris Murdoch novel). This continued briefly in 'Talking Turkey', then as a regular feature in the rock/culture fanzine Sun Zoom Spark (named incidentally after a Captain Beefheart song on the 'Clear Spot' album; references to Captain Beefheart lyrics occasionally appear in Bart Dickon stories).

Much of the material was reworked and extended for regular publication in The Chap magazine in the late nineties. November 2005 saw the publication of the book 'The Bart Dickon Omnibus' which built upon this body of work, completed the 'A Severed Head' graphic novella and added a short story featuring Dickon and other strips.

The character (not to mention the physiognomy) of Bart Dickon is mercurial by dint of the creative approach applied to the stories. Imagery informs the twists and turns of each chapter as much as narrative. Inasmuch as Dickon spends the majority of the novella as a head separated from the rest of his body, much of the action is guided by his sidekick, Snowy. This nods in the direction of the original daily Dick Barton radio series on the BBC Light Programme from 1946 to 1951 (later in novels and a trio of low budget feature films), although the spelling of the original character, Snowey, has been changed - as has his gender from time to time. The original theme tune: 'The Devil's Galop' by Charles Williams is also alluded to in 'The Bart Dickon Omnibus' and is hummed by the protagonist. Drawing on mythology, Dickon is seduced by a succubus, dismembered and the constituent parts scattered to the winds. Snowy and her doppelgänger carry Bart's head through multiple realities to save the day.

The collage comic strip approach to story telling relies almost solely upon found images, serendipity in research and the use of a narrative to bind the images, speech and thought bubbles and text boxes together. The roots of collage comic-strip can be found in the sound-collage experiments of Ron Geesin, the animations of Monty Python era Terry Gilliam, the surrealist novels of Max Ernst (Une Semaine de Bonté and 'La femme de 100 têtes), the agit-prop visuals of the Situationists and the satires of Biff.

Text-only stories and blogs about Bart Dickon and his chums also appear regularly on the World Wide Web.
