= Utopia Experiment =

Coordinates: 57.605°N 4.342°W

Culbokie, shown in the Scottish Highlands.

The Utopia Experiment was an experiment by Dylan Evans, set up in 2006 at Netherton Farm, near Culbokie on the Black Isle peninsula in the Scottish highlands. It involved a group of volunteers improvising a post-apocalyptic lifestyle. It was time-limited to 18 months, and was originally intended to serve as both a learning community (where everyone had a skill of knowledge they could teach the others) and a working community (where everyone would contribute by working).

After 10 months, Evans had become disillusioned with the project and concerned about his mental health. He went to see a doctor who referred him to a psychiatrist. Evans was then detained under the Mental Health Act for his own safety. After 4 weeks in a psychiatric hospital, he returned to the experiment to inform the volunteers that it was over. They, however, wanted the community to continue and renamed it the Phoenix Experiment, under which name it continued for several years. The site is now used as the Culbokie Community Garden, with individual plots for local residents.

Evans detailed his experience of the community in the 2015 book The Utopia Experiment published by Picador.
