= Jon Seger =

American ecologist

- Education: UC Santa Barbara; Harvard University
- Known for: Biological bet-hedging
- Awards: MacArthur Fellowship (1987); AAAS Fellow (2014)
- Scientific career
- Fields: Ecology; Genetics
- Workplaces: National Museum of Natural History; University of Sussex; University of Michigan; Princeton University; University of Utah
- Thesis: Models for the Evolution of Phenotypic Responses to Genotypic Correlations That Arise in Finite Populations (1980)
- Doctoral advisor: Robert Trivers

Jon Allen Seger is an American evolutionary ecologist, and Distinguished Professor of Biology at the University of Utah. He helped develop the theory of bet-hedging in biology. His work has appeared in leading scientific journals such as Nature, Science, Nature Genetics, Molecular Biology and Evolution, Journal of Evolutionary Biology, as well as popular magazines such as Scientific American.

== Biography ==
Dr. Seger attended UC Santa Barbara for his undergraduate studies, where he received a B.A. in English in 1969. Following college, he worked at the National Museum of Natural History on an assignment to help the museum establish public environmental education programs. He then enrolled at Harvard University, where he received his EdM in 1972 and his PhD in Biology in 1980. Much of his early work concerned models of sex ratio evolution and a variety of social insects (such as the Vespidae wasps). This work often took the form of mathematical models built from 'first principles' (such as his 1986 paper written with Robert Trivers). Following his PhD he held postdoctoral positions at the University of Sussex (1981-1982), the University of Michigan (1982-1983), and Princeton University (1983–86). He joined the faculty at the University of Utah in 1986.

== Career ==
His latest work concerns applications of coalescent theory to population genetics, particularly the mtDNA of whale lice, although members of his lab work on a variety of applied and theoretical topics that range from evolutionary ecology and genetics to mathematical biology and coalescent theory. In addition, he recently received an NSF grant to continue his work on the so-called "missing heritability" problem. His whale lice work had already shown that a genome should have many weakly deleterious mutations of small effect taken on their own but potentially large effect when taken together. This implies that the "missing" genes sought by, for example, human geneticists aren't actually missing: there are simply a lot more genes have a very small effect on fitness by themselves but have can have a large effect when the effects are combined.

== Awards ==
- 1987 MacArthur Fellows Program

== Works ==
- Seger J, Stubblefield JW (2002) "Models of sex ratio evolution". In Sex Ratios: Concepts and Research Methods (ed ICW Hardy), pp 2–25. Cambridge University Press. ISBN 978-0-521-66578-0
- Johnson KP, Seger J (2001) "Elevated rates of nonsynonymous substitution in island birds". Molecular Biology and Evolution 18:874-881.
- Morehead SA, Seger J, Feener DH Jr, Brown BV (2001) "Evidence for a cryptic species complex in the ant parasitoid Apocephalus paraponerae (Diptera: Phoridae)". Evolutionary Ecology Research 3:273-284.
- Branscomb A, Seger J, White RL (2000) "Evolution of odorant receptors expressed in mammalian testes". Genetics 156:785-787.
- Seger J (1999) "Is sex in the details?" Journal of Evolutionary Biology 12:1050-1052.
- Eckhart, Vincent M., Seger, Jon "Phenological and Development Costs of Male Sexual Function in Hermaphroditic Plants", Life history evolution in plants, Editors Timo Olavi Vuorisalo, Pia Kristina Mutikainen, Springer, 1999, pp 195–213. Kluwer. ISBN 978-0-7923-5818-3
- Herrick G, Seger J (1999) "Imprinting and paternal genome elimination in insects". In Genomic Imprinting: An Interdisciplinary Approach (Results and Problems in Cell Differentiation, vol. 25) (ed R Ohlsson) pp 41–71. Springer-Verlag.
- Berrigan DB, Seger J (1998) "Information and allometry". Evolutionary Ecology 12:535-541.
- Seger J, Stubblefield JW (1996) "Optimization and adaptation". In Adaptation (ed GV Lauder, MR Rose) pp 93–123. Academic Press.
- Seger J, Eckhart VM (1996) "Evolution of sexual systems and sex allocation in plants when growth and reproduction overlap". Proc R Soc Lond B 263:833-841.
- Richards MH, Packer L, Seger J (1995) "Unexpected patterns of parentage and relatedness in a primitively eusocial bee". Nature 373:239-241.
