= Anicius =

Scientific classification
- Kingdom: Animalia
- Phylum: Arthropoda
- Subphylum: Chelicerata
- Class: Arachnida
- Order: Araneae
- Infraorder: Araneomorphae
- Family: Salticidae
- Genus: Anicius; Chamberlin, 1925
- Species: A. dolius

Binomial name
- Anicius dolius Chamberlin, 1925

Genus of spiders

Anicius is a monotypic genus of Mexican jumping spiders containing the single species, Anicius dolius. It was first described by Ralph Vary Chamberlin in 1925, and is only found in Mexico.
