= David B. Richman =

- Education: University of Florida
- Scientific career
- Fields: Arachnologist
- Workplaces: New Mexico State University

David B. Richman is an American arachnologist and curator of the Arthropod Museum at New Mexico State University. Richman has described many species of spiders in North America and elsewhere.

Richman was born in New York State in 1942 and received his degrees at Arizona Western College (A.A. 1968), the University of Arizona (B.S. 1970, M.S. 1973) and the University of Florida (Ph.D 1977).
