= Richard Appignanesi =

Canadian writer and editor (1940–2025)

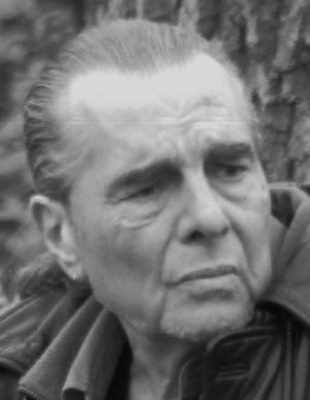
- Appignanesi in 2014
- Born: December 20, 1940; Montreal, Quebec, Canada
- Died: April 8, 2025 (aged 84)
- Education: Loyola College (Montreal), BA; University of Sussex, Ph.D.
- Occupations: Writer, editor and publisher
- Writing career
- Period: 1972 to present

Richard Appignanesi (/æpɪŋʊnˈeɪziː/; December 20, 1940 – April 8, 2025) was a Canadian writer and editor. He was the originating editor of the internationally successful illustrated For Beginners book series (since 1991 called the Introducing... series), as well as the author of several of the series' texts. He was a founding publisher and editor of Icon Books. He was founding editor of the Manga Shakespeare series. He was an executive editor of the journal Third Text, and reviews editor of the policy studies journal Futures.

Appignanesi authored four novels, a graphic novel, a variety of graphic texts, a volume of poetry, monographs and essays on cultural and literary subjects, and curated several projects.

== Education ==
Appignanesi was born in Montreal, Canada, to Italian immigrant parents, Ezio Appignanesi and his wife Angelina Canestrari. He distinguished himself in music at an early age when, in 1953, he was an E. Archambault Pour Mérite gold medal finalist and obtained a music scholarship at the Montreal Conservatory. He graduated with an Honors BA in English Literature in 1962 from Loyola College, Montreal. He traveled to England in 1967 and, in 1973, completed a D.Phil. in Art History from the University of Sussex: The Origins of Art Criticism in the Classical Greek and Later Phases of Antiquity. In the early 1990s he did biographical research on the Portuguese poet, Fernando Pessoa, at King's College, London.

== Editing and publishing ==
In 1974, Appignanesi co-founded the Writers and Readers Publishing Cooperative, Ltd. in London with a group of writers that included John Berger, Arnold Wesker, Lisa Appignanesi, Chris Searle and Glenn Thompson. In 1976, Appignanesi translated into English and published Mexican cartoonist Rius' Marx para Principiantes with the English title Marx for Beginners. The book's instant popularity prompted the development of the cooperative's international ...For Beginners series of illustrated documentary books, Writers and Readers' most ambitious undertaking. With Appignanesi as originating storyboard editor, the series was considered very successful, with translations into 16 languages and sales of well over a million copies; it earned Appignanesi a Directors Club (New York) Merit Award for art direction in 1980. The cooperative disbanded in 1984.

In 1991, together with Peter Pugh and Jeremy Cox, Appignanesi co-founded and became director of Icon Books Ltd., where he continued his originating editorship of the original illustrated ...For Beginners books, but now re-titled the Introducing.. series. Under that imprint, the series as of 2014 had expanded to include some 100 titles of illustrated texts on sophisticated topics in the areas of philosophy, politics, science and the arts. Independently and separately, Glenn Thompson of the original Writers and Readers relaunched ...For Beginners in 1992 under the name For Beginners, LLC.

In 2007, Appignanesi undertook a project explicitly targeting a youthful audience. The series, Manga Shakespeare, consists of Appignanesi's adaptations of several (14 as of 2014) of Shakespeare's plays in which the storyboards are created using selected but direct, unaltered quotations from the original texts, with illustrations by prominent UK-based manga artists.

== Writing ==
=== Illustrated texts (as author) ===
Appignanesi authored texts in collaboration with various illustrators. He has been called a "master of the graphic translation of complex cultural ideas" The Wolf Man: Graphic Freud is an illustrated narrative of one of Sigmund Freud's most famous case studies and founding text of modern psychoanalysis. Appignanesi's text is accompanied by the work of graphic artist Slawa Harasymowicz.

In the Beginner/Introducing series, Appignanesi wrote and edited Lenin for Beginners/Introducing Lenin, Freud for Beginners/Introducing Freud and Introducing Existentialism, all three titles illustrated by Oscar Zarate. Postmodernism for Beginners/Introducing Postmodernism and Introducing Learning and Memory were co-authored with Ziauddin Sardar.

=== Novels ===
Appignanesi wrote four novels, the first three of which were published as a fiction trilogy, Italia Perversa, consisting of the novels Stalin's Orphans, The Mosque, and Destroying America, originally drafted in 1967, saw light in the early 1980s. The trilogy is epic in the scale of its locations – Vienna, Zagreb, Italy while its Quebecois protagonist's travels are ultimately fated to ominous disillusionment through his separatist terrorism. However, Appignanesi's demanding and highly literate prose, in contrast to the generally well received approachable style of the illustrated texts, produced ambivalent reviews. It has been described as "A tour of twentieth century European culture with inescapable echoes of Musil, Svevo and Kafka... A fretful, nervous brilliance playing over much of the book a piece of infinite fascination, the sort of novel which, for all its faults, jerks us out of our provincialism." And "Literary devices and ambitions almost bury this 1967 saga... [but]...discussions are interesting and Mr. Appignanesi's descriptive skills are considerable."

Almost two decades later Appignanesi published Yukio Mishima's Report to the Emperor, a fictional autobiography of the Japanese poet, novelist, playwright, film director, actor and bodybuilder Yukio Mishima (1925–1970), one of the most important Japanese literary and artistic figures of the 20th century as well as an extreme-right activist. Appignanesi's novel is set predominantly in post-World War II reconstruction Japan and in Benares, India. Its narrative builds up to Mishima's horrific ritual suicide by seppuku that accompanied his failed right-wing coup against the Japanese government. The novel explores some of the more malignant recesses of Japanese society and culture. Its tone is one of a dark magical realism and the protagonist's journey traverses a variety of grotesque and horrific, yet often lyrically rendered landscapes. Penny Mountain, in the UK trade journal The Bookseller, wrote, "This formidable literary achievement […] In this fictional autobiography, Appignanesi . . . imagines in macabre, shocking and often comic detail the life and suicide of the extraordinary Japanese writer…"

=== Monographs ===
What Do Existentialists Believe? is an introduction to existentialism through a series of "thought experiments" about what it means to view our being human existentially. It traces the history of an existential approach to the question of being through major thinkers such as Søren Kierkegaard, Jean-Paul Sartre and Albert Camus. Axis Enigma, is a comparative study of Fassbinder, Mishima and Pasolini, three tragically gifted writers from defeated Fascist countries, linked by a common "axis," the aesthetic of sadism.

=== Poetry ===
A volume of poetry, The Street to Damascus, was published in 1972.

== Curatorships ==
Appignanesi co-curated with Juliet Steyn Pretext: Heteronyms, a Rear Window art exhibition of 21 artists responding to Fernando Pessoa's heteronymic personae, at Clink Street Studios, in London, in 1995. The exhibition, retitled Heteronymous, transferred in 1997 to the Palazzo San Michele a Ripa in Rome. It was co-curated by Appignanesi, Juliet Steyn, Achille Bonito Oliva, and Anna Maria Nassisi. The exhibition staged Appignanesi's play, Fernando Pessoa: the Man Who Never Was, directed by Marcello Sambati.

Appignanesi was program co-curator of the Writing Europe conference for the British Council in Kyiv, Ukraine, in 2005. He curated the art exhibition, Encounters in Relational Geography: Dust, Ashes, Residua, featuring seven East European artists, at Open Space, Zentrum für Kunstprojekte, in Vienna, in 2010. He presented another version of this exhibition, Raising Dust: Encounters in Relational Geography, with ten artists, at Calvert 22 Gallery, in London, in 2010 – 2011.

He was also co-curator, with Haim Bresheeth and Ali Nobil Ahmad, of a program of film exhibitions and related lectures, Winds of Change: Cinema in Muslim Societies, organized by Third Text and the Institute of Contemporary arts, London, in 2011.

== Personal life and death ==
In 1967 he married the writer Lisa Appignanesi (née Borensztejn) with whom he had one son, filmmaker Josh Appignanesi; the couple divorced in 1984. He also had a son, Raphael, and a daughter, Rosa, with different partners. He lived in London, England.

Richard Appignanesi died on April 8, 2025, at the age of 84.

== Bibliography ==
Novels

- The Street to Damascus (Covent Garden Press, London, 1972) — poems
- Italia Perversa (Quartet Books, London 1985–1986) — fiction trilogy
  - Stalin's Orphans
  - The Mosque
  - Destroying America

Monographs, Essays

- Axis: Fassbinder, Mishima, Pasolini, (Radius, London, 1989)
- Yukio Mishima's Report to the Emperor (Sinclair-Stevenson, London, 2002) — a novel
- Forgetting September 11: Yukio Mishima, Terrorism and American Innocence (Icon Books, London, 2005)
- What Do Existentialists Believe? (Granta Books, London, 2006)
- Beyond Cultural Diversity: The Case for Creativity (Asia Art Archive, London, 2010) — editor

Illustrated Texts

- Introducing... series
  - Introducing Learning and Memory (Icon Books, 1998) — with Ziauddin Sardar and Ralph Edney
  - Introducing Lenin and the Russian Revolution (Icon Books, London, 2000) — illustrated by Oscar Zarate
  - Introducing Existentialism (Icon Books, London, 2001) — illustrated by Oscar Zarate
  - Introducing Postmodernism (Totem Books, 2005) — with Ziauddin Sardar and Patrick Curry; illustrated by Chris Garratt
  - Introducing Freud (Icon Books, London, 2007) — illustrated by Oscar Zarate
- Graphic Freud: The Wolf Man (SelfMadeHero, London, 2012) — illustrated by Sława Harasymowicz
- Graphic Freud: Hysteria (SelfMadeHero, London, 2015) — illustrated by Oscar Zarate
