= For Beginners =

American publishing company

For Beginners, LLC
- Predecessor: Writers and Readers Cooperative, Writers and Readers Publishing, Inc.
- Founded: 1974; 52 years ago
- Founder: Glenn Thompson, Sian Williams, John Berger, Lisa Appignanesi, Richard Appignanesi, Arnold Wesker, Chris Searle
- Country of origin: U.S., previously United Kingdom
- Headquarters location: London (1974–87), then New York City (1987–2001), now Danbury, Connecticut
- Distribution: Red Wheel/Weiser/Conari
- Key people: Glenn Thompson; Dawn Reshen-Doty; Merrillee Warholak
- Publication types: Books
- Nonfiction topics: history, philosophy, politics
- Imprints: Harlem River Press; Black Butterfly Children's Books
- Official website: forbeginnersbooks.com

For Beginners LLC is a publishing company based in Danbury, Connecticut, that publishes the For Beginners graphic nonfiction series of documentary comic books on complex topics, covering an array of subjects on the college level. Meant to appeal to students and "non-readers", as well as people who wish to broaden their knowledge without attending a university, the series has sold more than a million copies.

The For Beginners series was launched in the mid-1970s, but became out of print and often unavailable after the 2001 death of co-founder and publisher Glenn Thompson. In 2007, a consortium of investors revived the series, reprinted back issues, and promised to publish between six and nine new issues each year. The current publisher is Dawn Reshen-Doty.

== History ==
The company began as Writers and Readers Publishing Cooperative, a London, England-based publisher founded in 1974 by Glenn Thompson, his then-wife Sian Williams, Richard Appignanesi, Lisa Appignanesi, John Berger, Arnold Wesker, and Chris Searle. A publishing cooperative, the founders of Writers and Readers shared the work and the profits. (The Cooperative also operated a London bookshop at 144 Camden High Street until the mid-1980s.)

The For Beginners series has its origins in two Spanish-language books, Cuba para principiantes (1960) and Marx para principiantes (1972) by the Mexican political cartoonist and writer Rius, pocket books that put their content over in a humorous comic book way but with a serious underlying purpose. An English-language version of the first book was published in 1970 by Leviathan Press of San Francisco and Pathfinder Press of New York, with no particularly great impact. However, when Richard Appignanesi published (and translated) the first English edition of Marx for Beginners (1976), it was soon clear that the collective had a hit on their hands. With a successful format identified, further For Beginners titles soon began to appear. The line's most enduring titles, all published during this period, were Marx for Beginners (1976), Lenin for Beginners (1977), Freud for Beginners (1979), Einstein for Beginners (1979), and Darwin for Beginners (1982).

In the early 1980s, questions of control arose after some members of the cooperative sold U.S. rights to part of the For Beginners series to Pantheon Books. The cooperative officially disbanded in 1984.

Following this rift, in 1987 Thompson took over as sole publisher and moved back to his hometown of New York City to establish a legal foothold and prevent any further unauthorized distribution of titles. Based in Harlem, the company was known as Writers and Readers Publishing, Inc.; in moving the company to Harlem, Thompson's goal was to stimulate a new Harlem Renaissance, in his creating an international publishing house there. He also started two other publishing companies: The Harlem River Press, publishing children's poetry, and Black Butterfly Children's Books, books for the inner-city child. The London-based company, formally established in 1992, was known as Writers and Readers Limited. For years, Thompson spent his time traveling between England and New York to manage the two companies.

In 1992, Richard Appignanesi, who had been the first editor in London for the series and had also written several of the titles, co-created the new publisher Icon Books, under whose imprint he republished several of the For Beginner titles and continued to publish and expand a British version of the series called Introducing. Meanwhile, the New York-based Writers and Readers continued the For Beginners series, in several cases commissioning new authors to create replacement books for those being published in Britain. This led to a number of examples where the two ranges were publishing two different books on the same subject.

Thompson died of cancer in London on September 7, 2001; by the time of his death, the company had published more than forty For Beginners titles.

Several years after Thompson's death, investors decided to buy the rights to the titles, creating For Beginners, LLC. In the summer of 2007 For Beginners LLC re-released twenty of the prior For Beginners titles and authorized the first new title, Dada and Surrealism For Beginners.

In 2010, the company released FDR for Beginners by Paul Buhle and Sabrina Jones, with an afterword by Harvey Pekar.
