= Dylan Evans =

British academic and author

- Born: 18 August 1966 (age 60); Bristol, England
- Known for: Emotion; Placebo
- Awards: British Medical Association Medical Book Competition (2003)

Academic background
- Education: London School of Economics PhD, 2000. Renounced 2024.
- Thesis: Rethinking Emotion: New Research in Emotion and Recent Debates in Cognitive Science (2000)
- Doctoral advisor: John Worrall

Academic work
- Discipline: Behavioural science
- Institutions: Universidad Francisco Marroquin 2012 American University of Beirut 2012; University College Cork 2008–2011; University of the West of England 2003–2006; University of Bath 2001–2003 King's College London 2000–2001

Dylan Evans (born August 18, 1966) is a British former academic and author who has written books on emotion and the placebo effect as well as the theories of Jacques Lacan.

== Life and career ==
=== Early life and education ===
Evans was born in Bristol on 29 September 1966 and went to private school at Sevenoaks School and the state-funded West Kent College of Further Education. His father is an aircraft engineer, his mother is a teacher.

At Southampton University he studied Spanish and Linguistics and later he received his doctorate in philosophy from the London School of Economics. His thesis, dated 2000, was titled Rethinking emotion: New research in emotion and recent debates in cognitive science.

Evans renounced his doctorate in 2024 as a protest against the LSE.

=== Academic career ===
Evans was a psychoanalyst in the style of Jacques Lacan, and wrote a standard reference work in the field. After several years, however, Evans eventually came to doubt the logical and scientific validity of Lacanianism, and ultimately abandoned the field because he was worried Lacanianism harmed rather than helped patients. Evans worked at the University of Bath and the University of the West of England in artificial intelligence. Evans resigned from the position of senior lecturer at the University of the West of England to start a project in sustainable living called the Utopia Experiment.

Evans was briefly a lecturer in Behavioural Science in the School of Medicine at University College Cork. In 2010 the university gave him the "President's Award for Research on Innovative Forms of Teaching" for his Cork Science Cafe project (together with colleague Catherine O'Mahony).

Risk intelligence is one of his research areas.

On 15 September 2010, Evans, along with 54 other public figures, signed an open letter published in The Guardian, stating their opposition to Pope Benedict XVI's state visit to the UK.

In spring 2010, Evans was accused of sexual harassment by a colleague after he showed her an article about the sex life of fruit bats. After an investigation by an external team, Evans was cleared of the charge of sexual harassment. He was ordered by UCC to undergo a "two-year period of monitoring and appraisal under the university’s duty of respect and 'right to dignity' policy". In the course of the campaign, confidential documents were leaked. Disciplinary proceedings were halted when Evans applied for judicial review at the Irish High Court. On 1 December 2010 the High Court quashed the sanctions imposed on Evans by the President of UCC, which the judge described as "grossly disproportionate", and awarded costs to Evans.

=== The Utopia Experiment ===
From 2006 he spent a while running the "Utopia Experiment" in the Highlands of Scotland. This was to be a self-sufficient group of people growing their own food, with no television and limited use of electricity for eighteen months. After ten months Evans had become disillusioned with the project and concerned about their health. He went to see a doctor who referred him to a psychiatrist. Evans was then detained under the Mental Health Act for his own safety. After four weeks in a psychiatric hospital he returned to the experiment to inform the volunteers that it was over. However, they wished for the community to continue and renamed it the Phoenix Experiment. As of 2015 some of them were still there.

=== After the "Utopia Experiment" ===
After leaving the experiment Evans moved to Ireland where he was a resident for 5 years. He then relocated to Guatemala. In a 2015 interview he said he was working on a novel set in the region. Evans also became the CEO of Projection Point, a risk intelligence company.

From 2019 to 2023 Evans worked at Mindlab International, a market research agency based in Brighton UK, first as an account manager and then as Head of Internal Research.

=== Personal life ===
Evans is Muslim and a Marxist.

== Selected publications ==
- The Utopia Experiment (2015)
- Atheism: All That Matters (2014)
- Risk Intelligence: How to Live with Uncertainty (2012)
- Emotion, Evolution and Rationality (2004)
- Placebo: The Belief Effect (2003)
- Introducing Evolution (2001)
- Emotion: The Science of Sentiment (2001)
- Introducing Evolutionary Psychology (1999)
- An Introductory Dictionary of Lacanian Psychoanalysis (1996)
