= Introducing... (book series) =

Book series by Icon Books

- Country: England
- Language: English
- Publisher: Icon Books
- Published: 1992–present
- Media type: Paperback
- Preceded by: ...For Beginners

The Introducing... series is a book series of graphic guides covering key thinkers and topics in philosophy, psychology and science, and many others in politics, religion, cultural studies, linguistics and other areas. Books are written by an expert in the field and illustrated, comic-book style, by a leading graphic artist.

== History ==
The Introducing... series, like the For Beginners series, has its origins in two Spanish-language books, Cuba para principiantes (1960) and Marx para principiantes (1972) by the Mexican political cartoonist and writer Rius, pocket books which put their content over in a humorous comic book way but with a serious underlying purpose. An English-language version of the first book was published in 1970 by Leviathan Press of San Francisco and Pathfinder Press of New York, to no particularly great impact. However, when Richard Appignanesi edited the first English edition of Marx for Beginners (1976) for the London-based Writers and Readers Publishing Cooperative, of which he was a co-founding member with Glenn Thompson and others, it was soon clear that the collective had a hit on their hands. With a successful format identified, further "... for Beginners" titles soon began to appear. The line's most enduring titles, all published during this period, were Marx for Beginners (1976), Freud for Beginners (1979), Einstein for Beginners (1979), and Darwin for Beginners (1982). In the early 1980s schism arose over questions of control after some members of the cooperative sold U.S. rights to part of the For Beginners series to Pantheon Books and the Cooperative officially disbanded in 1984.

In 1992, Richard Appignanesi, who had been the first editor in London for the series and had also written several of the titles, co-created the new London-based publisher Icon Books, under whose imprint he republished several of the For Beginner titles and continued to publish and expand a new version of the series. Meanwhile, Glenn Thompson, who, since 1987, had continued the For Beginners through his New York-based Writers and Readers Publishing, Inc., also established the London-based Writers and Readers Limited in 1992, to protect his own continuation of the series. These two publishers continued their series in several cases commissioning new authors to create alternate books to those being published by the other, leading to a number of examples where the two series were publishing two different books under the same title. The situation was eventually resolved in 1999 by the Icon series being rebranded as the Introducing... series, with titles starting with that word instead of ending "For Beginners".

Beginning in 2008, Icon's new titles and reissues played down the "Introducing..." to the level of a series name, and the titles were instead prominently subtitled "A Graphic Guide" (such as Introducing the Holocaust). In 2011, a second "Introducing..." series was launched with the subtitle "Practical Guides" focusing on topics within business, psychology and counselling.

== Reception ==
Science writer Brian Clegg, author of Introducing Infinity (2012) in the series, states that, "It is almost impossible to rate these relentlessly hip books - they are pure marmite," as the series, "puts across the message in a style that owes as much to Terry Gilliam and pop art as it does to popular science."

== Books ==
- Introducing Kafka

== See also ==
- For Beginners, LLC
- Complete Idiot's Guides, a similar series of how-to books from Alpha Books
- For Dummies, a similar series of introductory books
- Teach Yourself, a similar series published by Hodder Headline
- Very Short Introductions, a similar series of introductory books published by Oxford University Press
