= Amit Varshizky =

Israeli historian (born 1977)

- עמית ורשיצקי
- Born: 1977 (age 48–49); Haifa, Israel
- Occupation: Historian

Academic background
- Education: PhD (2017), Tel Aviv University

Academic work
- Institutions: Tel Aviv University, The Hebrew University of Jerusalem, and the Hebrew University of Jerusalem, Jena Center 20th Century History
- Notable works: The Metaphysics of Race: Science and Faith in the Nazi Worldview, Routledge. 2024 (published in Hebrew in The Open University of Israel Publishing House and Yad Vashem, 2021.)
- Website: https://uni-jena.academia.edu/amitvarshizky

Amit Varshizky (Hebrew: עמית ורשיצקי; born in 1977) is an Israeli-born historian, novelist, and essayist who lives in Berlin. His fields of expertise include the history of racism and anti-Semitism in modern Europe, intellectual and cultural history of Nazism, German Romanticism, philosophy of science, and theories of religion, myth, and secularism.

== Education ==
Born in Haifa, Israel, Varshizky earned his bachelor's degree in Mass Media and Communication from the Faculty of Social Sciences in Academic College of Emek Yezreel and his MA in history from the Tel Aviv University. In 2017, he was awarded a PhD in History from Zvi Yavetz Graduate School of Historical Studies at Tel Aviv University.

== Career ==
In 2016, Amit Varshizky was a lecturer in the History Department at Oranim Academic College of Education. He also taught in the Department of Cultural Studies at Sapir Academic College and the Department of Communications at the Academic College of Emek Izrael.

From 2017 to 2018, Varshizky was a Research Fellow at the Minerva Institute for German History of the Tel-Aviv University. From 2018 to 2019, he was a Research Fellow at the Vidal Sassoon International Center for the Study of Antisemitism (SICSA) in The Hebrew University of Jerusalem. From November 2019, Varshizky served as a guest researcher at the Jena Center 20th Century History, Friedrich-Schiller-University University of Jena, Germany.

He is also a singer-songwriter who has released two albums.

== Family ==
Varshizky lives in Berlin with his wife and two children.

== Weitings ==
=== The Metaphysics of Race: Science and Faith in the Nazi Worldview ===
His book The Metaphysics of Race: Science and Faith in the Nazi Worldview (2021) was awarded the Goldberg Prize for the best research book and the Bartal Am VeOlam Prize of the Israel Historical Society for an outstanding book for the year 2022. An English version of the book was published by Routledge in 2024.

The book illustrates how Nazi ideology took on the form of an all-encompassing system of thought that saturated all aspects of life, offering a spiritual antidote to the increasing disintegration of a “disenchanted” modern world and a new existential and ethical fulcrum with which to face the dangers of contemporary nihilism.

=== Novel: Face of Janus ===
In November 2021, Varshizky published Face of Janus, a historical novel awarded the Israeli Minister of Culture and Sports Award in the field of Hebrew literature for 2021 and the Dudu Geva Literature Award for the best Israeli alternative book for 2022. Israel Hayom praised the book as a "magnum opus," rare in its breadth and depth of discussion. The novel interweaves facts, anecdotes, and historical quotations with myths and fiction, and the historical figures speak their own words as recorded in documents from the period. The plot revolves around a discharged American soldier in post-war II Paris who falls in love with a prostitute. She entrusts him with the diary of Helmut Knochen, the chief of the Nazi Sicherheitspolizei (security police). The secrets in the diary summon the superpowers to the scene as each struggles for dominion over Europe. The book is also an inquiry into the eternal question of the sources of evil, and its Gothic architecture embodies the chronic ambivalence of the human condition.

== Views ==
Varshizky contributes essays on politics, philosophy, and culture to the newspaper Haaretz and other Israeli newspapers.

After the Ukraine war outbreak, Varshizky published an article about Alexander Dugin, in which he introduced the Israeli public to Dugin’s ideas and his influence on Putin's politics. Varshizky wrote that “Dugin’s radical ideas don’t end with imperialist ambitions and declarations about the need to restore “Great Russia”; he purports to put forward a cultural, spiritual and moral alternative to the liberal order of the modern West.

After the October 7 attacks, Varshizky wrote: “The illusion that fundamentalism and terrorism can be overcome with Western tools has been completely shattered. In light of the left’s intellectual hypocrisy and the right’s lust for war, it may be time for a new approach.” Varshizky proposed a “third way” for human solidarity which “does not pass through the blurring of cultural boundaries or through forcing the values of the secular West on non-Western and non-secular cultures, but rather lies in adopting a principle of equality in diversity and in cultivating life-sanctifying values, values of openness and tolerance, which exist to some degree in every religion and every culture while emphasizing what’s shared over what’s different and articulating a unifying vision of a multihued humanity based on recognition of universal human nature.”

Varshizky criticized the use of disproportionate military force in the Gaza war and argued that the aim is restoring Israel's domestic morale and making up for its loss of self-confidence after the 7th of October. He also claims that messianism in Israeli political and public discourse has moved from the margins of right-wing politics into the Likud center. He points to the weakness of the conventional liberal view and believes that messianism and myth cannot be counteracted by learned logical arguments”. He claims that a counter-myth is needed, one that does not lie within the realms of religion and meta-earthly redemption but in the imperfect world of humankind.

In some essays, Varshizky has emphasized the fluctuations in the discourse of values and the collective mentality of Israeli society and pointed to the underlying changes in Israeli society and its transition from a liberal and democratic society into a more ethnocentric, religious and non-liberal society, which is driven by political-messianism and paternalist populism. He argues that only a radical transformation in Israeli secular culture, education, and intellectual-spiritual life can bring about an actual change.

== Selected works ==
Essays

- (January 13, 2023) Beauty Will Save World: The Climate Crisis Calls for a Revolution in Human Thought. Haaretz.
- (May 20, 2022) What Nazism Can Teach Us About the World's Forthcoming Revolutions. Haaretz.
- (2021) Non-Mechanistic Explanatory Styles in the German Racial Science: A Comparison of Hans F. K. Günther and Ludwig Ferdinand Clauß. Medicine and the Holocaust: New Studies on Victims, Perpetrators and Legacies for the 21st Century.
- (2019) The Metaphysics of Race: Revisiting Nazism and Religion. Central European History.
- (2019) In the Shade of Wilhelm Wundt: Völkerpsychologie and its influence on National Socialist Racial Theory. Yalkut Moreshet-Holocaust Documentation and Research, 99.
- (2017) In Search of the 'Whole Man': Soul-Man-World in the National Socialist Weltanschauung. Dapim: Studies on the Holocaust.
- (2017) Between science and metaphysics: Fritz Lenz and racial anthropology in interwar Germany. Intellectual History Review.
- (2012) Alfred Rosenberg: The Nazi Weltanschauung as modern Gnosis. Politics, Religion & Ideology.

Book reviews

- (2023) Review of Dan Diner’s Dire Times. Jerusalem: Magnes, 2022. Moreshet.
- (2022) Review of Angelika Bammer, Born After: Reckoning with the German Past. Psychoanalysis and History.
- (2018) Review: Transfinite Life. Oskar Goldberg and the Vitalist Imagination by Bruce Rosenstock. German Studies Review, 41:3 (October 2018), 642–644.

Books

- (2024) The Metaphysics of Race. Routledge.
  - (2021) המטפיזיקה של הגזע: מדע ואמונה בהשקפת העולם הנאצית. The Open University of Israel Press and Yad Vashem.

Encyclopedias

- Racism, lexica entries, the Holocaust Resource Center – Yad Vashem (the Encyclopedia of the Holocaust edited by Dr. Shmuel Spector on Dr. Robert Rozett).

Novel

- (2021) פני יאנוס (English: Face of Janus). Carmel Publishing House: Jerusalem, Israel.
