= Lisa Appignanesi =

British-Canadian writer, novelist and campaigner

Lisa Appignanesi OBE FRSL
- Born: Elżbieta Borensztejn; 4 January 1946 (age 80); Łódź, Poland
- Education: McGill University; University of Sussex
- Occupation: Writer
- Spouses: Richard Appignanesi (1967–1984, divorced); John Forrester (widowed)
- Children: Josh Appignanesi; Katrina Forrester
- Writing career
- Language: English
- Notable works: Losing the Dead; Mad, Bad and Sad

Lisa Appignanesi (born Elżbieta Borensztejn; 4 January 1946) is a British-Canadian writer, novelist, and campaigner for free expression. Until 2021, she was the Chair of the Royal Society of Literature, and is a former President of English PEN and Chair of the Freud Museum London. She chaired the 2017 Man Booker International Prize won by Olga Tokarczuk. She is a founding editor of the website EXPeditions and chair of its editorial advisory board.

She is an Honorary Fellow of St Benet's Hall, Oxford, and visiting professor in the Department of English at King's College London, and held a Wellcome Trust People Award there for her public series on The Brain and the Mind. Her book Mad, Bad, and Sad: A History of Women and the Mind Doctors won the 2009 British Medical Association Award for the Public Understanding of Science, among other prizes. She has written for The New York Review of Books, The Guardian and The Observer, as well as making programmes and appearing on the BBC.

== Biography ==
=== Personal life and education ===
Appignanesi was born Elżbieta Borensztejn on 4 January 1946 into a Jewish family in Łódź, Poland, the daughter of Hena and Aaron Borensztejn. Following her birth, her parents moved to Paris, France, and in 1951 emigrated to Montreal, Quebec, Canada, where she grew up.

She studied at McGill University in Montreal, where she was a features editor for The McGill Daily. In 1966, she earned her BA in English and in 1967 her MA degree (with a thesis on Edgar Allan Poe) and married writer Richard Appignanesi. After their marriage, the couple moved to England, where she obtained a DPhil degree in Comparative Literature at the University of Sussex in 1970. During this period, she spent some time in Paris and Vienna, and wrote the thesis that became the book Proust, Musil and Henry James: femininity and the creative imagination, which was published in 1974. The couple had one son, film director Josh Appignanesi; they separated in 1981 and divorced in 1984.

Her later partner, then husband, was John Forrester, Professor of History and Philosophy of Science at Cambridge, with whom she wrote Freud's Women. The couple's daughter, Katrina Forrester, is an associate professor of Government and Social Studies at Harvard University. Lisa Appignanesi lives in London.

=== Academic work ===
After a year working as a writer in a Manhattan social research firm, Appignanesi returned to Britain to work as a European Studies lecturer at the University of Essex. She then lectured at New England College and in 1976 was one of the founders of the Writers and Readers Publishing Cooperative, which included Richard Appignanesi, John Berger and Arnold Wesker and launched the graphic Beginners series with titles on Marx and Freud. In 1975, she published The Cabaret, a history of cabaret, a new edition of which came out in 2005 (Yale University Press).

=== ICA ===
In 1980, Appignanesi left academia to become Director of Talks and Seminars at the Institute of Contemporary Arts (ICA) in London, where she stayed for ten years and helped the ICA talks programme gain a reputation as "an intellectual hothouse". While at the ICA, she edited the Documents series, which included the books Postmodernism and Ideas from France. She became deputy director of the ICA in 1986 and created the ICA-Television branch, which produced England's Henry Moore in 1988 and Seductions for Channel Four. She left the ICA in 1990 to write full-time.

=== Writing ===
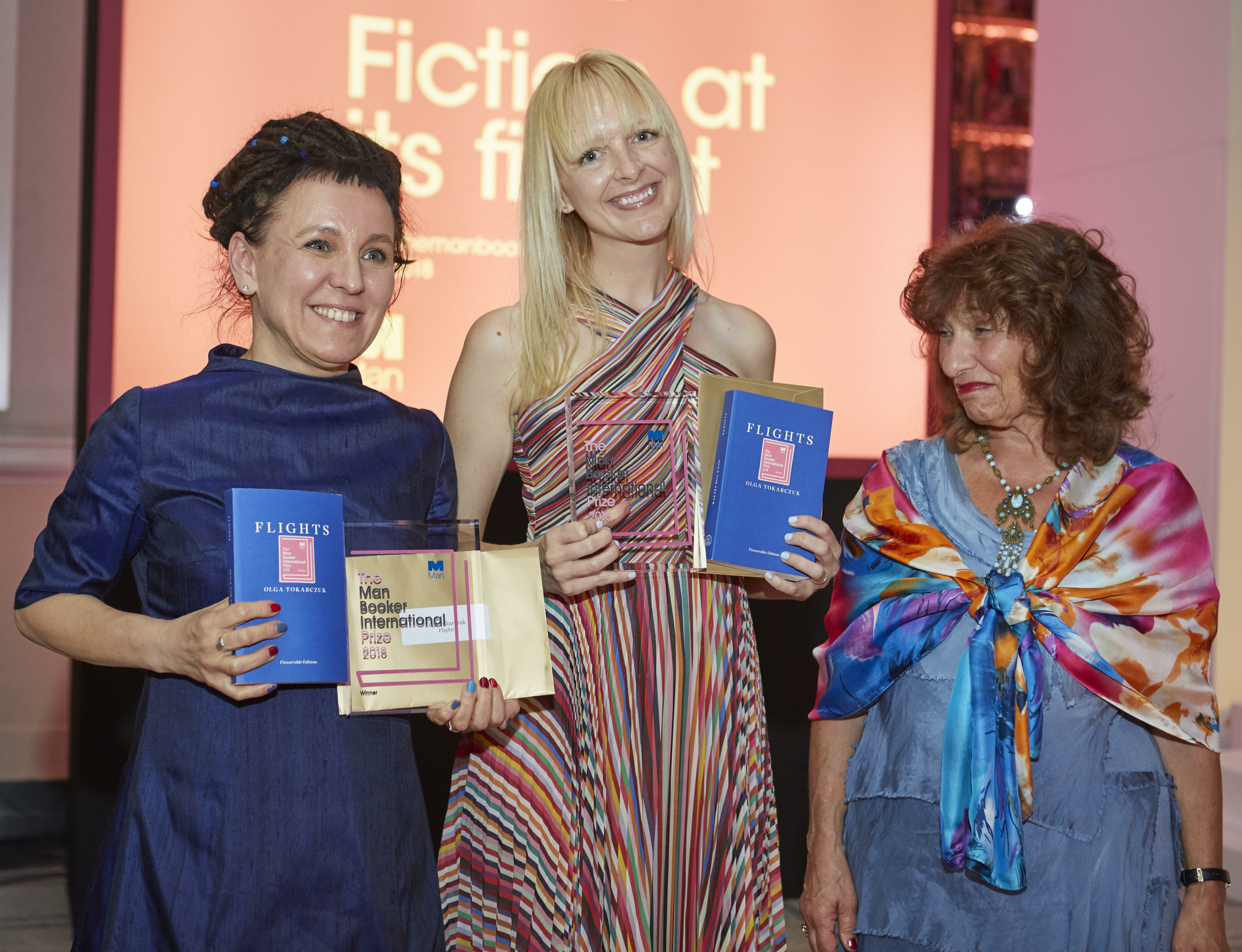
Olga Tokarczuk and Jennifer Croft with Lisa Appignanesi, chair of the judges for the 2018 Man Booker International Prize.

In 1991, Appignanesi published a best-selling novel, Memory and Desire. A major study of Freud's life, ideas and his relations to women, Freud's Women (co-written with John Forrester) was published in 1992. As well as these, she has written several other works of fiction, including thrillers. She has also written the award-winning Mad, Bad and Sad: Women and the Mind Doctors in 2008 and All About Love (2011).

Appignanesi has co-written two films on Salman Rushdie for French television, presented two series of radio programmes on Sigmund Freud for BBC Radio 4, presented the arts and ideas Nightwaves programme for BBC Three, contributed to a variety of programmes, including Saturday Review, Start the Week and Woman's Hour, and written for the New Writing Partnership. Appignanesi has appeared as a cultural commentator on many television programmes, including the BBC's Newsnight and Late Review. She was General Editor of The Big Ideas series, published by Profile Books, which includes Violence by Slavoj Zizek and Bodies, by Susie Orbach. She worked as a fellow of the Brain and Behaviour Laboratory at the Open University, was a council-member of the ICA (2000–2006) and was Chair of the Freud Museum, London, from 2008 to 2014. She has also written for The Guardian, The Observer, The Independent, and The Daily Telegraph and The New York Review of Books. She is a former member of the Board of IMPRESS Project, the independent monitor for the UK Press.

In 2004, she became the Deputy President of English PEN and then President (2008–2011). As part of her work with English PEN, she edited Free Expression is No Offence, a collection of writings that formed part of English PEN's protest against what became the Racial and Religious Hatred Act 2006 and helped induce the British Government to amend the bill by inserting a robust clause protecting freedom of expression. Under her presidency, English PEN launched its report on Libel Reform, "Free Speech is Not for Sale", helped to rid Britain of obsolete Blasphemy and Criminal Libel laws, as well as setting up the PEN Pinter Prize. Appignanesi was also voted one of Britain's Top 101 female public intellectuals.

Appignanesi has been nominated for the Charles Taylor Prize, and the Jewish Quarterly-Wingate Literary Prize for her family memoir Losing the Dead, while her novel The Memory Man was short-listed for the Commonwealth Writers' Prize and won the Canadian Holocaust Fiction Award. Losing the Dead describes how her parents managed to survive occupied Poland by passing as Aryans. Mad, Bad and Sad was short-listed for the Warwick Prize and long-listed for the Samuel Johnson Prize, amongst others, and won several awards. With John Berger, she translated the work of Nella Bielski. The Year is 42 won the Scott Moncrieff Prize for Literary Translation.

In 1987, she was made a Chevalier of the Ordre des Arts et des Lettres.

Appignanesi was appointed Officer of the Most Excellent Order of the British Empire (OBE) in the 2013 New Year Honours for services to literature. She became a Fellow of the Royal Society of Literature (RSL) in 2015 and became the Chair of the Royal Society of Literature Council in 2016. She is also a founding editor of the website EXPeditions and chair of its editorial advisory board.

== Selected works ==
=== Books ===
as Lisa Appignanesi

- The Language of Trust (1973)
- Proust, Musil and Henry James: Femininity and the Creative Imagination (1974)
- The Cabaret (1975)
- Ideas from France (1986) (editor)
- Postmodernism (1988) (editor)
- The Rushdie File (1989) (edited with Sara Maitland)
- Memory and Desire (1991)
- Freud's Women (1992) (co-author: John Forrester) (new edition 2005)
- Dreams of Innocence (1994)
- A Good Woman (1996)
- The Things We Do for Love (1997)
- Losing the Dead: A Family Memoir (1999)
- The Dead of Winter (1999)
- Sanctuary (2000)
- Paris Requiem (2001) (new edition 2014)
- The Cabaret (2004)
- Kicking Fifty (2004)
- The Memory Man (2004)
- Free Expression is No Offence (2005)
- Unholy Loves (2005); published in the UK as Sacred Ends (2014)
- Simone De Beauvoir (2005)
- Mad, Bad and Sad: Women and the Mind Doctors (2008)
- All About Love: Anatomy of an Unruly Emotion (2011)
- Fifty Shades of Feminism (edited with Rachel Holmes and Susie Orbach) (2013)
- Trials of Passion: Crimes in the Name of Love and Madness (2014)
- Everyday Madness (2018)

As Jessica Ayre

- Not to Be Trusted (1982)
- One-Man Woman (1982)
- Hard to Handle (1983)
- New Discovery (1984)

=== Book reviews ===
| Year | Review article | Work(s) reviewed |
|---|---|---|
| 2018 | *Appignanesi, Lisa (22 February 2018). "Painting on the precipice". The New York Review of Books. 65 (3): 48–50. | Salomon, Charlotte. Life? Or theatre?. Overlook Duckworth.; Salomon, Charlotte. Life? Or theatre? A selection of 450 gouaches. Essays by Judith C. E. Belinfante and Evelyn Benesch. Taschen. |

=== Videos and media ===
- Lisa Appignanesi - Resisting threats
- Lisa Appignanesi - Standing up for ideas
- Lisa Appignanesi - A lifelong passion
- Lisa Appignanesi on EXPeditions - Women and the mind doctors
- Lisa Appignanesi on EXPeditions - Extreme emotions in the West
- Lisa Appignanesi on EXPeditions - Emotions: good, bad and maddening
- Lisa Appignanesi on EXPeditions - The medicalisation of happiness
