= Katrina Forrester =

British political theorist and historian

- Born: 1986 (age 39–40); UK
- Spouse: Jamie Robert Martin (m. 2019)
- Relatives: John P. Forrester (father); Lisa Appignanesi (mother); Josh Appignanesi (brother)
- Awards: Merle Curti Award

Academic background
- Education: MA, PhD, 2013, University of Cambridge
- Thesis: Liberalism and realism in American political thought 1950-1990. (2013)

Katrina Max Forrester (born 1986) is a British political theorist and historian, and the John L. Loeb Associate Professor of the Social Sciences at Harvard University. Her research interests are in the history of liberalism and the left in the postwar US and Britain; Marxism, feminism, and psychoanalysis; climate politics; and theories of work and capitalism.

== Early life and education ==
Forrester was born in 1986 to parents Lisa Appignanesi and John Forrester. Her mother is an author and her father was a professor in the department of history and philosophy of science at the University of Cambridge.

== Career ==
After completing her PhD at King's College, Cambridge, she held a research fellowship at St John's College, Cambridge. Upon completing her fellowship, Forrester accepted a permanent lectureship at Queen Mary University of London until 2017 when she joined the faculty at Harvard University. Forrester held a Kluge Fellowship at the Library of Congress from 2019 to 2020 and delivered the Quentin Skinner Lecture at Cambridge in 2023.

Forrester's book In the Shadow of Justice: Postwar Liberalism and the Remaking of Political Philosophy received the Organization of American Historians' Merle Curti Award for Best Book in Intellectual History by the Organization of American Historians the Society for US Intellectual History's Book Award, the International Conference for the Study of Political Thought's David and Elaine Spitz Prize, the Montreal Political Theory Manuscript Workshop Award, and was shortlisted for the Royal Historical Society's Gladstone Prize 2020.

Forrester has written on topics like feminism, socialism, pornography, sex work, surveillance, work, and capitalism for the London Review of Books, The New Yorker, Dissent, n+1, Jacobin, Harper's and The Guardian, amongst others. She is the co-editor of Nature, Action and the Future: Political Thought and the Environment with Sophie Smith, and of a special section of Dissent with Moira Weigel.

== Personal life ==
Forrester married Jamie Martin in 2019. In the 2000s, she was an activist with the direct action group Plane Stupid and with the Camp for Climate Action, later writing about her experiences with police and corporate spying on climate activists for the London Review of Books.
