= John Forrester (historian) =

British philosopher (1949–2015)

John P. Forrester (25 August 1949 – 24 November 2015) was a British historian and philosopher of science and medicine. His main interests were in the history of the human sciences, in particular psychoanalysis and psychiatry.

== Life ==
Born and raised in London, Forrester attended Haberdashers' Aske's Boys' School from 1960 to 1966 and read natural sciences at King's College, Cambridge (1967–70), graduating with a First in Part II History and Philosophy of Science. In Cambridge he was taught by Gerd Buchdahl, Mary Hesse and Robert M. Young. In 1970–72, as a graduate student in the History of Science Program at Princeton University, he took courses with Thomas Kuhn, Gerald Geison, Theodore M. Brown and Charles Coulston Gillispie. In 1972 he spent six months teaching science in London secondary schools and in 1973–74 worked for the Science Policy Foundation. From 1973 to 1976 he was a graduate student at King's College, Cambridge, a junior research fellow in the college (1976–80) and a senior research fellow (1980–84); during this time he researched in Vienna (1975) and while in Paris (1977–78), attached to the École Normale Supérieure, was much influenced by the lectures of Michel Foucault at the Collège de France. In 1984, he was appointed to a university lectureship in history and philosophy of science at Cambridge, was promoted to reader in 1996 and to professor in 2000. He was head of department from 2007 to 2013.

He was visiting professor at the Institute of Logic and the Epistemology of the Human Sciences, University of Campinas, Brazil (1988); visiting professor at the Institut für Wissenschafts- und Technikforschung, University of Bielefeld in Germany (1997); research scholar, Getty Research Institute in the History of Art and the Humanities, Santa Monica, California (1998); Whitney J. Oates Fellow of the Council of the Humanities and the Program in the History of Science, Princeton University (2001); Schaffner Visiting Professor, Franke Institute for the Humanities, University of Chicago (2003); professor, Ittingen Summer School, Kartaus Ittingen, Switzerland (2004); Visiting Directeur d’Études, École des Hautes Études en Sciences Sociales, Paris (2006). He taught at the School of Criticism and Theory when it was located at Dartmouth College (1995).

== Work ==
Much of his research was devoted to the history of psychoanalysis and the life and work of Sigmund Freud; he also studied the work of Jacques Lacan for many years, including co-translating two of Lacan's Seminars. His PhD thesis became his first published book, Language and the Origins of Psychoanalysis (1980), which argued for the considerable influence of the sciences of language, from neurology (aphasia) to philology, on the development of Freud's psychoanalysis. Freud's Women (1992), co-written with Lisa Appignanesi, explored the part that women played in Freud's work and the history of psychoanalysis, from patients to practitioners, including the extensive debates over the nature of femininity that took place in Freud's work, during his lifetime and in second wave feminism of the 1960s and 1970s. He has also published three collections of papers: The Seductions of Psychoanalysis. Freud, Lacan and Derrida (1990); Dispatches from the Freud Wars. Psychoanalysis and its Passions (1997), about the so-called Freud Wars, in which he contends with some contemporary critiques of psychoanalysis (Stanley Fish, Adolf Grünbaum, Frederick Crews, Frank Sulloway), criticising their outmoded conceptions of science, and the sterility of contemporary debates concerning the scientific status of psychoanalysis; and Truth Games. Lies, Money, and Psychoanalysis (1997). He had extensive interests in cases as a genre and as a style of reasoning, linked to the prominence of the case history in psychoanalytic work and writing, and has published a series of papers on cases, including the influential 'If p then what? Thinking in cases'. In later years, he published (in part with Laura Jean Cameron) papers documenting the reception of psychoanalysis in early twentieth century Cambridge. He was editor of the journal Psychoanalysis and History (2005–14).

Thinking in Cases, the volume that contains "If P then what" and other essays on the case, came out soon after he died.

His final book, Freud in Cambridge (co-authored with Laura Jean Cameron), was finished before his death, and was published in 2017 by Cambridge University Press. Sander L. Gilman said of it "this is one of the most important books on twentieth-century British intellectual history I have read in a long time".

== Personal life ==
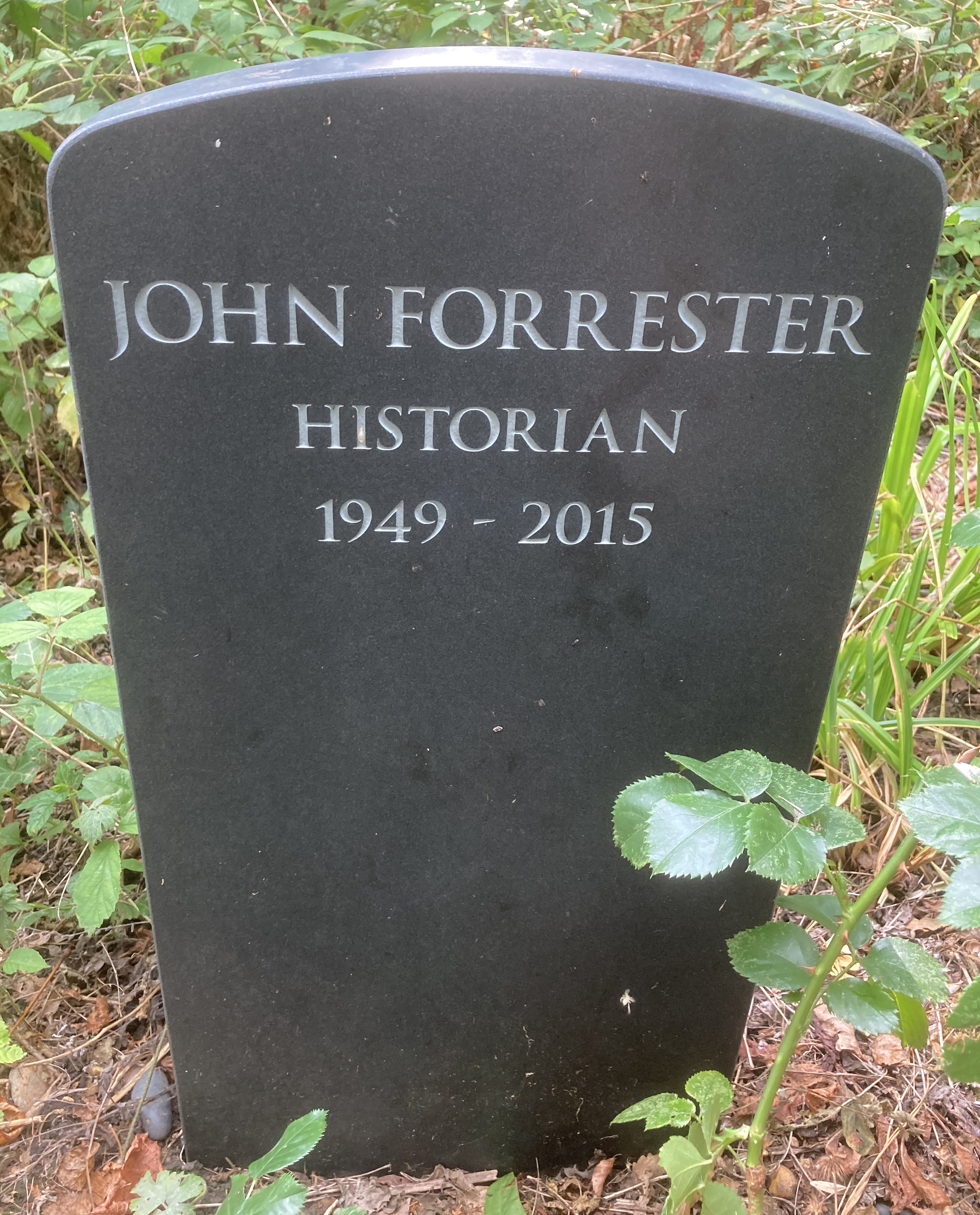
Grave of John Forrester in Highgate Cemetery

Forrester was married to Lisa Appignanesi; their daughter is Katrina Forrester, an assistant professor in political theory at Harvard University; his step-son is the filmmaker Josh Appignanesi. John Forrester died on 24 November 2015 from cancer. He was buried on the eastern side of Highgate Cemetery.
