= Appignanesi =

Appignanesi is a surname. It may refer to:

- Ennio Appignanesi (1925–2015), Italian Roman Catholic archbishop
- Josh Appignanesi (born 1975), British film director, producer and screenwriter
- Lisa Appignanesi (born 1946), British writer, novelist and campaigner
- Richard Appignanesi (1940–2025), Canadian writer and editor
