= Laura Jean Cameron =

Canadian human geographer and historian

- Born: Laura Jean Cameron
- Partner: Matt Rogalsky
- Awards: Distinguished Psychoanalytic Educator (2019)

Academic background
- Education: University of British Columbia (BA, MA); Cambridge University (PhD)

Laura Jean Cameron (born 1966) is a Canadian human geographer and historian. She is a professor in the Department of Geography and Planning at Queen's University in Kingston, Ontario. Her research interests are in historical geography, environmental history, the history of psychoanalysis, and field recording.

Cameron has authored several books, including Openings: A Meditation on History, Method and Sumas Lake (1997) and Freud in Cambridge (2017; co-authored with John Forrester).

== Life ==
Cameron was born in 1966, the youngest daughter of Jody Cameron (born 1939), who worked as a theater producer at University of the Fraser Valley, and John Barry Cameron (1928–2010), who worked as a teacher at Chilliwack Secondary School. Her siblings are textile artist Heather Cameron; actor, playwright, and craftsman David Cameron; and Rob Cameron, who is an electrical engineer.

Cameron grew up in Stó꞉lō territory in British Columbia. She received her Bachelor of Arts (1989) and Master of Arts (1994) degrees from the University of British Columbia. In 2001, she earned a PhD from Cambridge University.

Cameron's partner Matt Rogalsky is a sound artist and is also a professor at Queen's University. The couple have a child, Arden Rogalsky (born in 1999), and have collaborated on research projects, particularly into the history of field recording, and have organized a number of sound installations. The family has lived in Kingston, Ontario, since 2003.

== Work ==
Cameron's MA thesis Openings to a Lake: Historical Approaches to Sumas Lake, British Columbia became her first published book. It was published in 1997 with the title Openings: A Meditation on History, Method and Sumas Lake. In the book, she explores the complex relationship between place and history using the case of Sumas Lake in British Columbia, which was drained in the 1920s. From 1999 to 2002, Cameron worked as a Junior Research Fellow in Historical Geography at Churchill College, Cambridge. As Canada Research Chair in Historical Geographies of Nature (2003–2012), she investigated a range of field sciences as place-based practices and cultural encounters.

Cameron has also written biographical works, such as Freud in Cambridge (2017). The book, which Cameron co-authored with John Forrester, was written before the latter's death and was published by Cambridge University Press.

Cameron also was the editor of the book Friend Beloved: Marie Stopes, Gordon Hewitt, and an Ecology of Letters (2021), a biographical portrait of the British botanist Marie Carmichael Stopes and the Canadian entomologist and biologist Charles Gordon Hewitt. Exploring their friendship in letters, the book reveals early ecology's revolutionary promise but also its involvement in colonialism and eugenics. Cameron also co-edited Emotion, Place and Culture (2009) and Rethinking the Great White North: Race, Nature, and the Historical Geographies of Whiteness in Canada (2011).
