= Psychoanalysis and History =

- Discipline: Psychoanalysis
- Language: English
- Edited by: Matt Ffytche; Dagmar Herzog

Publication details
- History: 1999–present
- Publisher: Edinburgh University Press (United Kingdom)
- Frequency: Biannual

Standard abbreviations
- ISO 4: Psychoanal. Hist.

Indexing
- ISSN: 1460-8235 (print); 1755-201X (web)
- OCLC no.: 39861592

Links
- Journal homepage; Online archive

Psychoanalysis and History is a peer-reviewed academic journal published biannually in January and July by Edinburgh University Press. It covers the history of psychoanalysis and the application of psychoanalytic ideas to historiography. It aims to provide a bridge "between the academic study of history and psychoanalysis".

John Forrester (1949–2015), a historian and philosopher of science from the University of Cambridge, was its principal director.

== Bibliography ==
- Anne Ber-Schiavetta, " Histoire de la psychanalyse, histoire des sciences. Renouvellements et convergences ", Revue française de psychanalyse, 2020/1 (Vol. 84), p. 223-232, DOI : 10.3917/rfp.841.0223, ,
