= History of Paris (1946–2000) =

Aspect of Parisian history

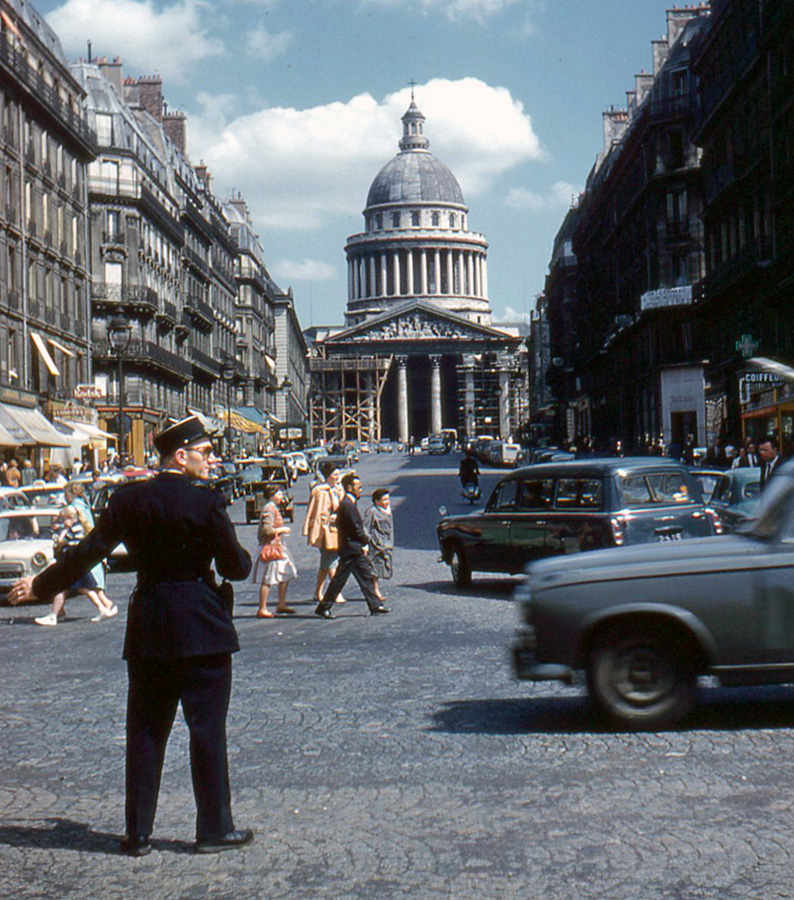
Agent de police directing traffic and the Panthéon (1960)

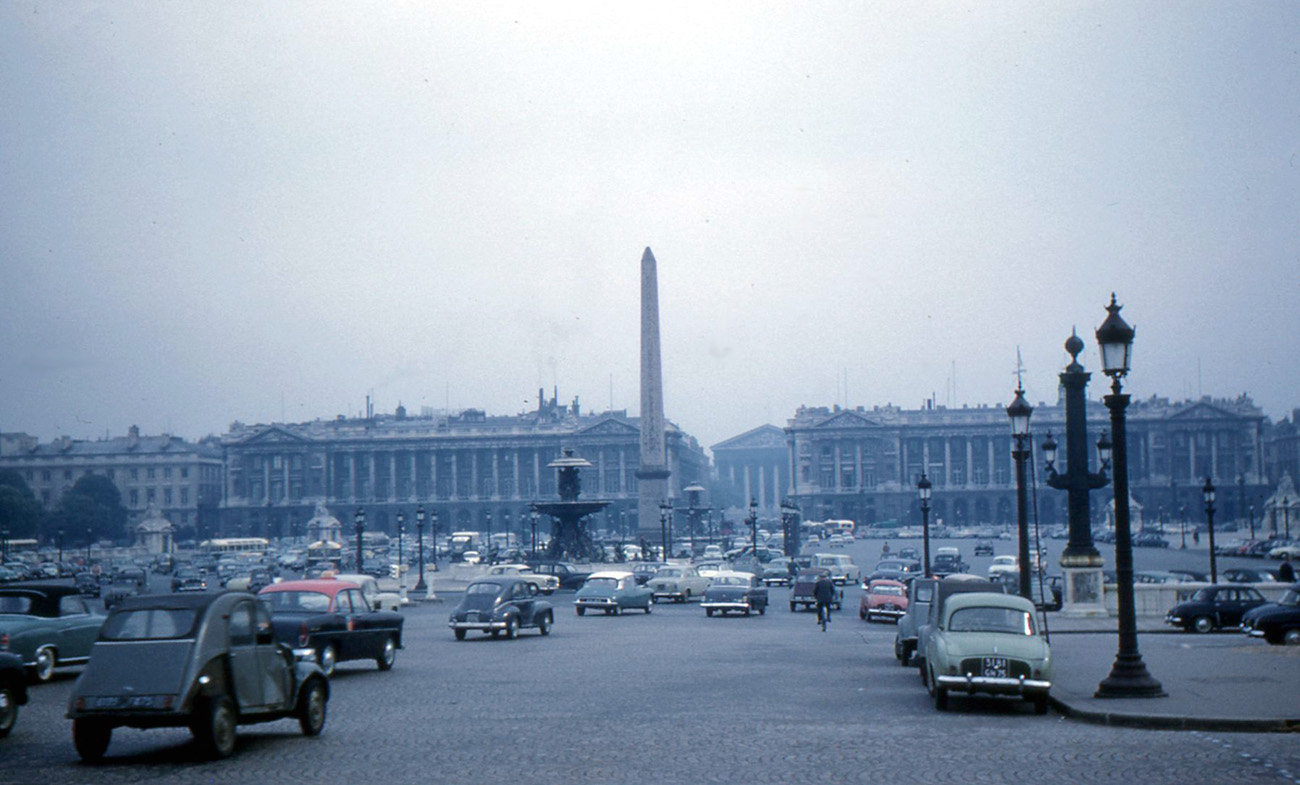
Place de la Concorde (1960)

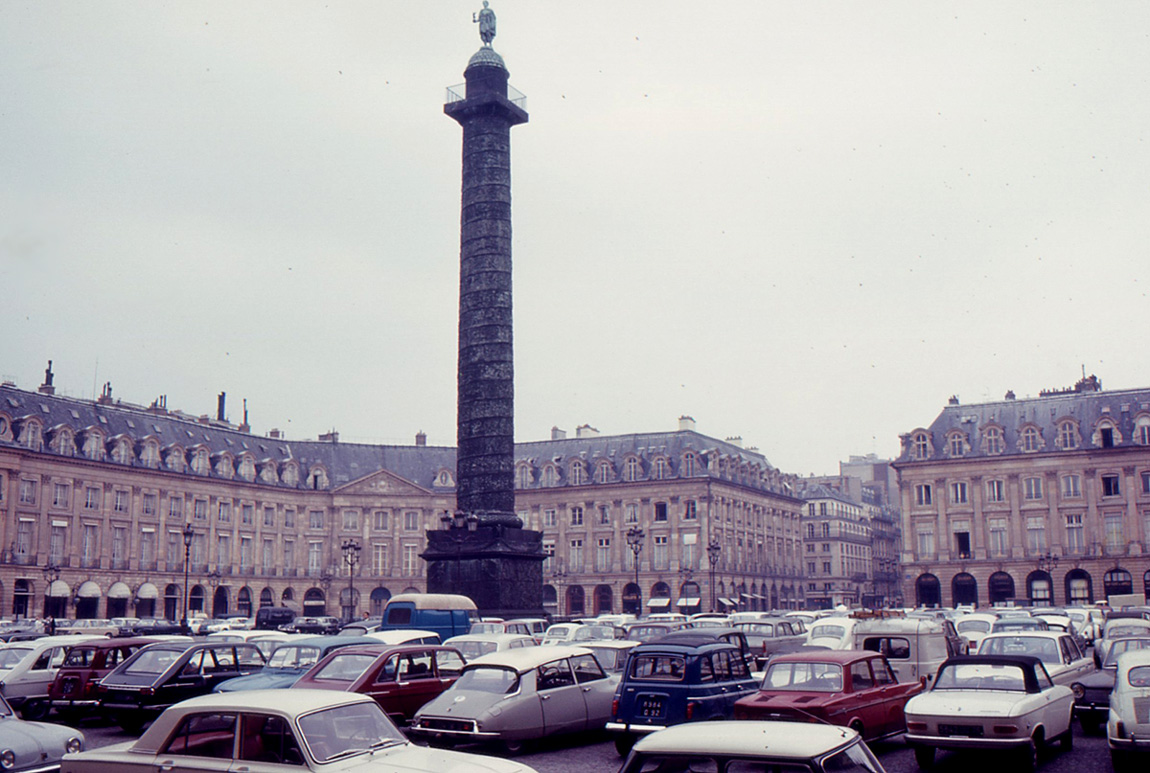
Cars parked in Place Vendôme (1968)

At the end of the Second World War in Europe, most Parisians were living in misery. Industry was ruined, housing was in short supply, and food was rationed. The population of Paris did not return to its 1936 level until 1946. It grew to 2,850,000 by 1954, including 135,000 immigrants, mostly from Algeria, Morocco, Italy and Spain. The exodus of middle-class Parisians to the suburbs continued. The population of the city declined during the 1960s and 1970s (2,753,000 in 1962, 2.3 million in 1972) before finally stabilizing in the 1980s (2,168,000 in 1982, 2,152,000 in 1992).

In the 1950s and 1960s, the city underwent a massive reconstruction, with the addition of new highways, skyscrapers, and thousands of new apartment blocks. Beginning in the 1970s, French Presidents took a personal interest leaving a legacy of new museums and buildings: President François Mitterrand had the most ambitious program of any President since Napoleon III. His Grands Travaux included the Arab World Institute (Institut du monde arabe), a new national library called the Bibliothèque François Mitterrand; a new opera house, the Opéra Bastille, a new Ministry of Finance, Ministère de l'Économie et des Finances, in Bercy, the Grande Arche in La Défense, and the Grand Louvre, with the addition of the Louvre Pyramid designed by I. M. Pei in the Cour Napoléon.

In the post-war era, Paris experienced its largest development since the end of the Belle Époque in 1914. The suburbs began to expand considerably, with the construction of large social estates known as cités and the beginning of La Défense, the business district. A comprehensive express subway network, the Réseau Express Régional (RER), was built to complement the Métro and serve the distant suburbs. A network of roads was developed in the suburbs centered on the Périphérique expressway encircling the city, which was completed in 1973.

In May 1968, a student uprising in Paris led to major changes in the educational system, and the breakup of the University of Paris into separate campuses.

Paris had not had an elected Mayor since the French Revolution. Napoleon Bonaparte and his successors had personally chosen the Prefect to run the city. Under President Valéry Giscard d'Estaing, the law was changed on December 31, 1975. The first mayoral election in 1977 was won by Jacques Chirac, the former Prime Minister. Chirac served as Mayor of Paris for eighteen years, until 1995, when he was elected President of the Republic. He was succeeded by another candidate of the right, Jean Tiberi.

== Paris during the Fourth Republic (1946–1958) ==
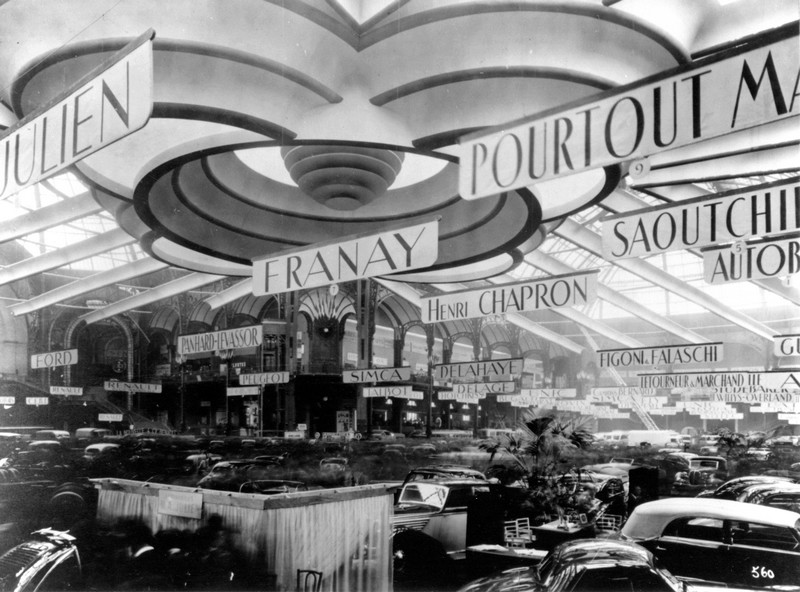
Recovering from the war. Paris automobile show in 1946.

The first municipal elections in Paris (and in France) since the war had been held on April 29 and May 13, 1945; they were also the first French elections in which women could vote. Six parties had taken part. The Communists had won 37 percent of the vote and 27 council seats out of 90, making them the largest party in the city government. On October 21, 1945, the first parliamentary elections since the war took place, which were won by a coalition of communists and socialists. In 1946 the new government nationalized the private electric and gas utility companies, and closed a long-time Paris institution, the houses of prostitution (Loi Marthe Richard).

The end of the war did not end the hardships of the Parisians. Rationing of bread continued until February 1948, and coffee, cooking oil, sugar and rice were rationed until May 1949. Many of the factories around the city had been bombed during the war, and were still in ruins.

Some Paris institutions were quick to get back on their feet. On February 12, 1946, the first major fashion show after the war was organized by Christian Dior at 30 Avenue Montaigne. High fashion soon became an important French export industry and foreign currency earner. The automobile industry also came back to life, putting on a glittering show of new automobile models in 1946.

In 1947, there were growing tensions in the government between the communists and their coalition partners, the socialists. On April 25, the communist trade unions began a strike at the Renault factory, one of the largest enterprises in the city. On May 5, the new socialist prime minister, Paul Ramadier, dismissed communist ministers from the government. The communists responded by organizing strikes and work stoppages of railroad and bank employees. In the meanwhile, the food shortage had gotten worse; the bread ration was reduced to two hundred grams per person, worse than during the German occupation.

=== The housing shortage ===
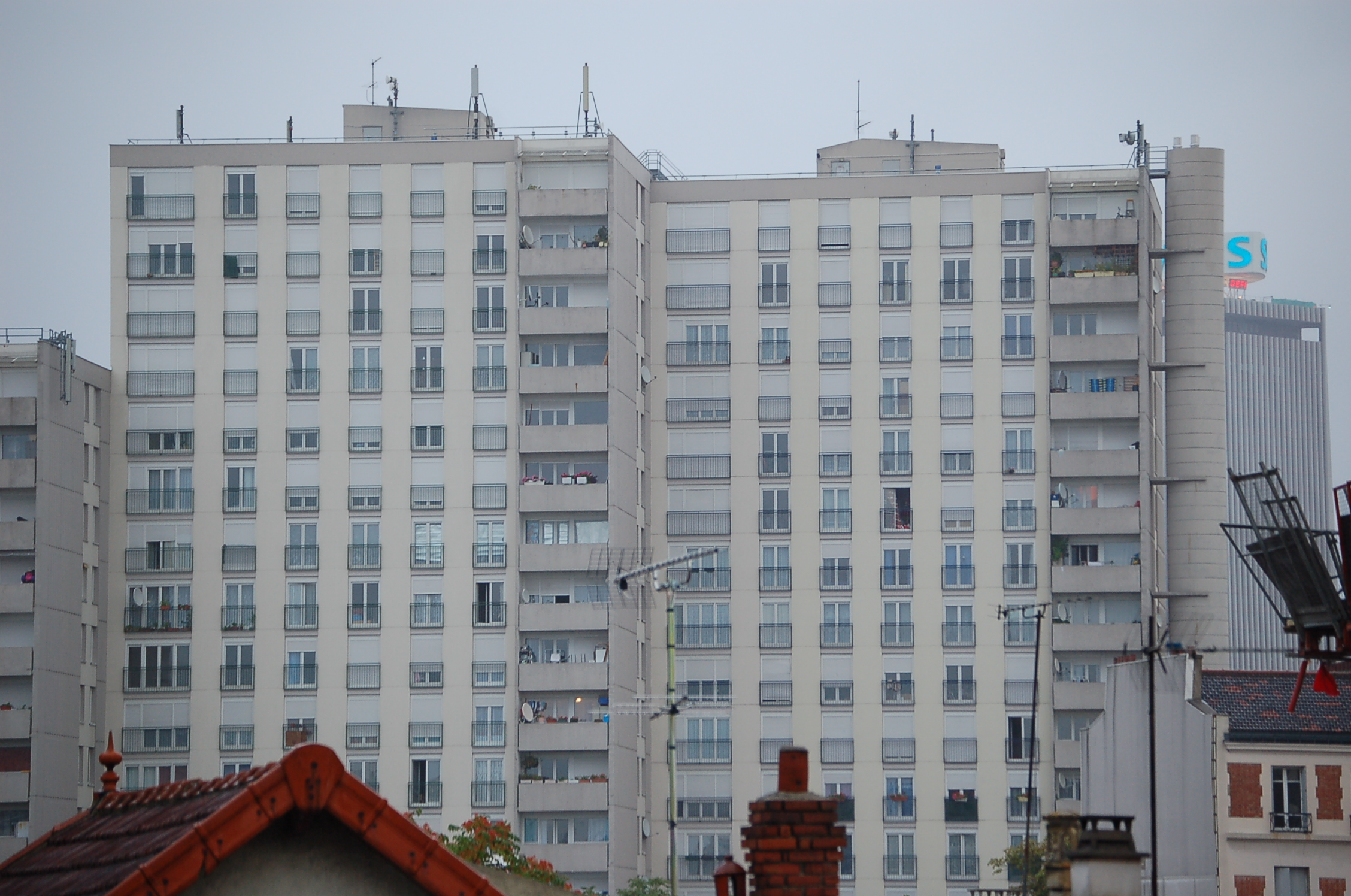
Public housing project in Seine-Saint-Denis, in the Paris suburbs

Housing was a particularly daunting problem. The population of Paris grew by about 50,000 persons a year between 1946 and 1954, adding 379,000 residents. However, very little housing had been built in the past twenty-five years to house them. 35 percent of the apartment buildings had been built before 1871. 81 percent of the apartments did not have their own bathroom, and 55 percent did not have their own toilet. 100,000 housing units in the village had been declared unhealthy; 90,000 which had been declared uninhabitable were still occupied. Health was also a major problem, with 100,000 cases of tuberculosis in the city, killing hundreds of persons each year, particularly in the crowded apartment buildings and furnished lodging houses.

The government tried to improve the lives of working-class Parisians by imposing strict rent controls, the monthly rent of a skilled metal worker came to about four percent of his monthly salary, regardless of inflation or the cost of living. The unintentional result was to stop new construction, create a black market in apartments, and reduce even further the number of available housing units, affecting particularly young Parisians. In 1953, half of young married couples were still living with their parents, and 15 percent were living in a single furnished room. In 1954, 20 percent of housing units still did not have running water, two thirds did not have a toilet in their unit, and three-quarters did not have their own bathtub or shower.

In 1950, the government began a new large-scale project to construct apartment blocks for low-income Parisians, after 1950 called HLMs (habitations à loyers modérés, or residences with moderate rents), usually on the edges of the city or in the suburbs. In 1952, some 82,000 new housing units were built in France, but this only covered a fraction of the new homes needed in Paris. A new minister of lodging, Pierre Courant, was named in 1953, and he launched a much larger-scale program of construction. The new buildings were called LOGECOS, or Logements économiques, and they were built largely in the Paris suburbs, where land was cheaper and more available. Prefabricated and mass-produced materials were used, greatly reducing the cost of construction. Money was also saved by building much larger numbers of apartments at the same time in the same location. In the suburban community of Sarcelles, a single project built in 1954 contained 13,000 housing units. These new buildings, to save money, were often far from markets or city centers, and had few facilities or access to public transportation. In the 1950s, they were occupied largely by French-born workers. In the 1960s and 1970s, they became the home of tens of thousands of immigrants.

=== Labor unrest ===
The political system of the Fourth Republic was highly unstable; the President of the Republic had little power, the National Assembly was divided into constantly-changing coalitions, and the Prime Ministers changed frequently. The government of Pierre Mendès France lasted seven and a half months, that of Edgar Faure for just four months. The longest government, that of Guy Mollet, lasted a year and seven months. The left-wing governments nationalized many of the major industries in and around Paris, including the utilities providing electricity and gas.

In October 1947, the Paris municipal elections were won by the Rassemblement du peuple français, a new center-right party led by Charles de Gaulle, with 52 seats on the council out of ninety. The Communists won twenty-five seats, the socialists won five. The communist trade unions responded to the new government by organizing strikes of metal workers, public employees, teachers, and railroad workers in an effort to bring down the government, and called a general strike for December 1. Railroad lines were sabotaged, and the army, navy, army and firemen were called in to keep electricity networks and the metro running. On December 9, the communists called off the strike, but labor unrest continued. A strike in December 1950 caused the cutoff of electricity, and the shutdown of the Paris Metro.

=== Paris, Indochina and Algeria ===
In the early 1950s, France was engaged in a highly unpopular war to hold on to its colony of Indochina; in seven years the war cost the lives of one hundred thousand French soldiers. The decisive defeat of the French army at Dien Bien Phu, on May 7, 1954, led the government of Mendés France to the end of the war and the division of Vietnam into two countries, and the beginning of a stream of Vietnamese immigrants to Paris.

In the early 1950s, Algeria was a department of France, and the government was determined to keep it so. On May 1, 1951, the first demonstration of Algerians demanding independence took place in Paris, followed by a much larger demonstration on the Champs Élysées on May 18, 1952. On July 14, violent confrontations took place between the police, Algerian independence demonstrators and their communist supporters. Seven persons were killed, and one hundred twenty-six injured.

In November, 1954, Algerian independence movements began an armed uprising to break away from French rule. Prime Minister Mendes-France and his minister of the Interior, François Mitterrand, increased French troops in Algeria from 57,000 to 83,000 and arrested two thousand suspected nationalists. The war soon had consequences on the streets of Paris. Killings began of members of two rival Algerian factions, the Front de Libération Nationale (FLN), or National Liberation Front, and the Mouvement national algérien (MNA); and large demonstrations against the government were jointly organized by the communists and Algerian nationalists.

In 1956, Tunisia and Morocco, both at the time protectorates of France, received independence, and in Sub-Saharan Africa the government began the process of preparing its colonies for independence. All of these events soon led to an increased migration to Paris.

Three other events with long-term significance took place in Paris during the years of the Fourth Republic: on December 10, 1948, the United Nations General Assembly adopted the Universal Declaration of Human Rights at the Palais de Chaillot; on December 15, 1948, Zoé, the first French nuclear reactor, designed by Frédéric Joliot-Curie, was tested at located at Fort de Châtillon; and on August 1, 1954, a Paris ordnance banned the honking of automobile horns "except in case of danger." The constant din of taxi horns in the center of Paris became just a memory.;

== Paris under de Gaulle (1958–1968) ==
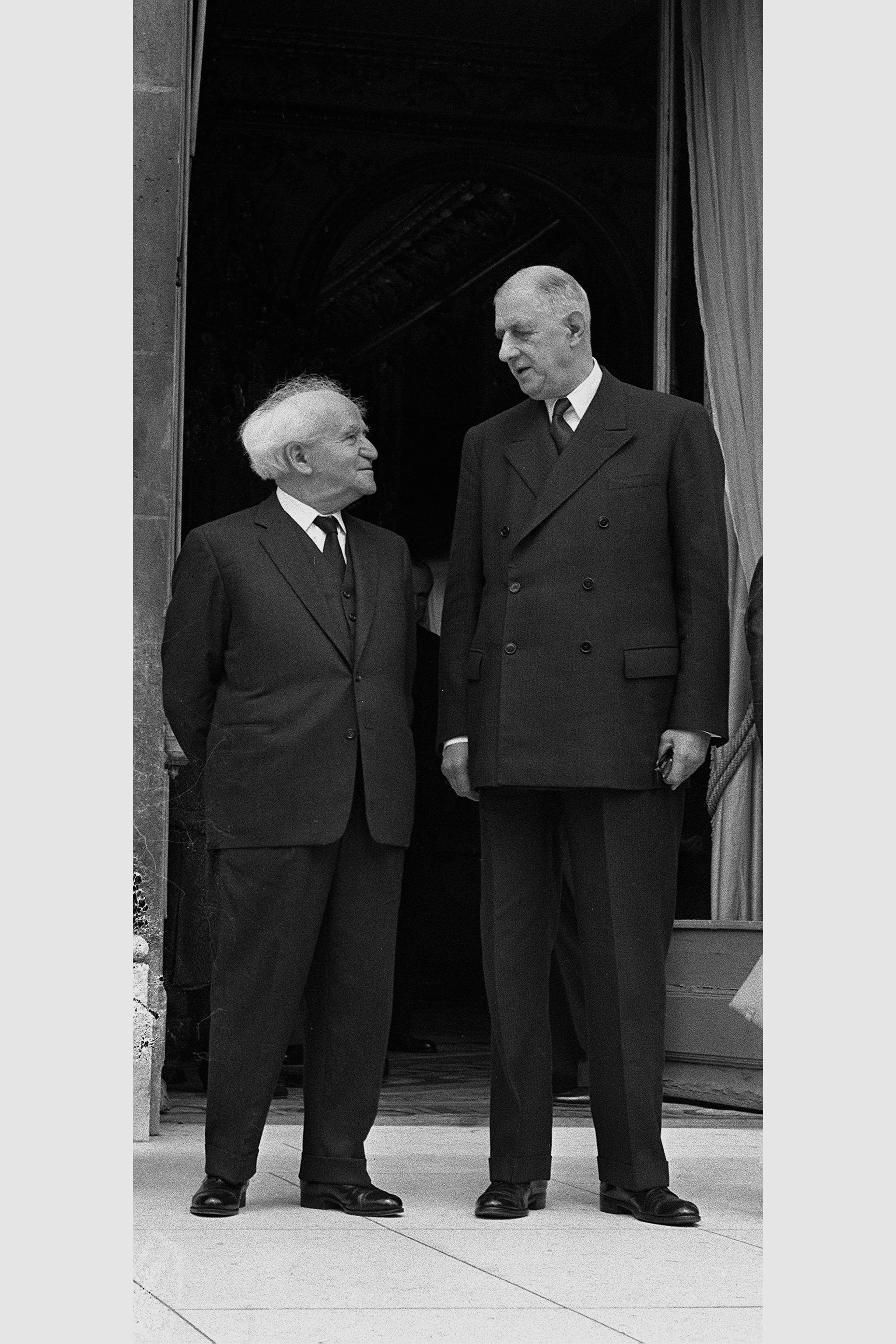
De Gaulle with Israeli President David Ben Gurion (1960)

In May 1958, the government the Fourth Republic, hopelessly deadlocked by divisions over the War in Algeria and other issues, resigned. The President of the Republic, René Coty, invited Charles de Gaulle to form a new government and prepare a revised Constitution. Within three months, the new Constitution was drafted and put to a vote on September 28, 1958; it was approved by more than 80 percent of voters. and a new government was in place. The Fifth Republic was born on October 4, 1958.

During the ten years that de Gaulle occupied the presidency, France and Paris experienced rapid economic growth, which was accompanied by the building of new office buildings and housing, and the rehabilitation of historic neighborhoods in the center of the city. De Gaulle's Minister of Culture, André Malraux, oversaw the reconstruction of the historic neighborhoods in the center, particularly Le Marais. In Le Marais and the other designated historic zones, the rehabilitation consisted of leaving the façade and walls intact, while rebuilding completely the interior of the building. The Malraux law also required that the façades of buildings be scrubbed clean of centuries of accumulated soot and dirt. The most visible improvement was the cleaning of Notre-Dame de Paris, which in a few months turned from black to white.

In other neighborhoods in the center of the city, the rehabilitation took a different form: residential buildings of the Haussmann era were transformed into offices. As the price of land doubled in the city center, middle class residents moved out to the suburbs. Dilapidated and crumbling residential buildings were torn down and replaced by office buildings. The population of the arrondissements in the city center markedly decreased.

The neighborhood of the central market of Les Halles was also a target for renewal. The old market was too small and traffic around it too congested to serve the needs of the growing city. One of the historic pavilions was preserved and moved to a park outside the city, but the others were closed down and the site, after long debate, was eventually turned into a park and underground commercial space, the Forum des Halles.

=== The first towers ===
The Front de Seine and Beaugrenelle project in the 15th arrondissement, started in the 1960s, created a wall of residential towers along the Seine.

Les Olympiades project in the 13th arrondissement, with Paris's Chinatown at the far southern edge.

Until the 1960s there were no tall buildings in Paris to share the skyline with the Eiffel Tower, the tallest structure in the city; a strict height limit of thirty-five meters was in place. However, in October 1958, under the Fifth Republic, in order to permit the construction of more housing and office buildings, the rules began to change. A new urban plan for the city was adopted by the municipal council in 1959. Higher buildings were permitted, as long as they met both technical and aesthetic standards. The first new tower to be constructed was an apartment building, the Tour Croulebarbe, at 33 rue Croulebarbe in the 13th arrondissement. It was twenty-two stories, and sixty-one meters high, and was completed in 1961. Between 1960 and 1975, about 160 new buildings higher than fifteen stories were constructed in Paris, more than half of them in the 13th and 15th arrondissements. Most of them were about one hundred meters high; several clusters of high-rises the work one developer, Michel Holley, who built the towers of Place d'Italie, Front de Seine, and Hauts de Belleville.

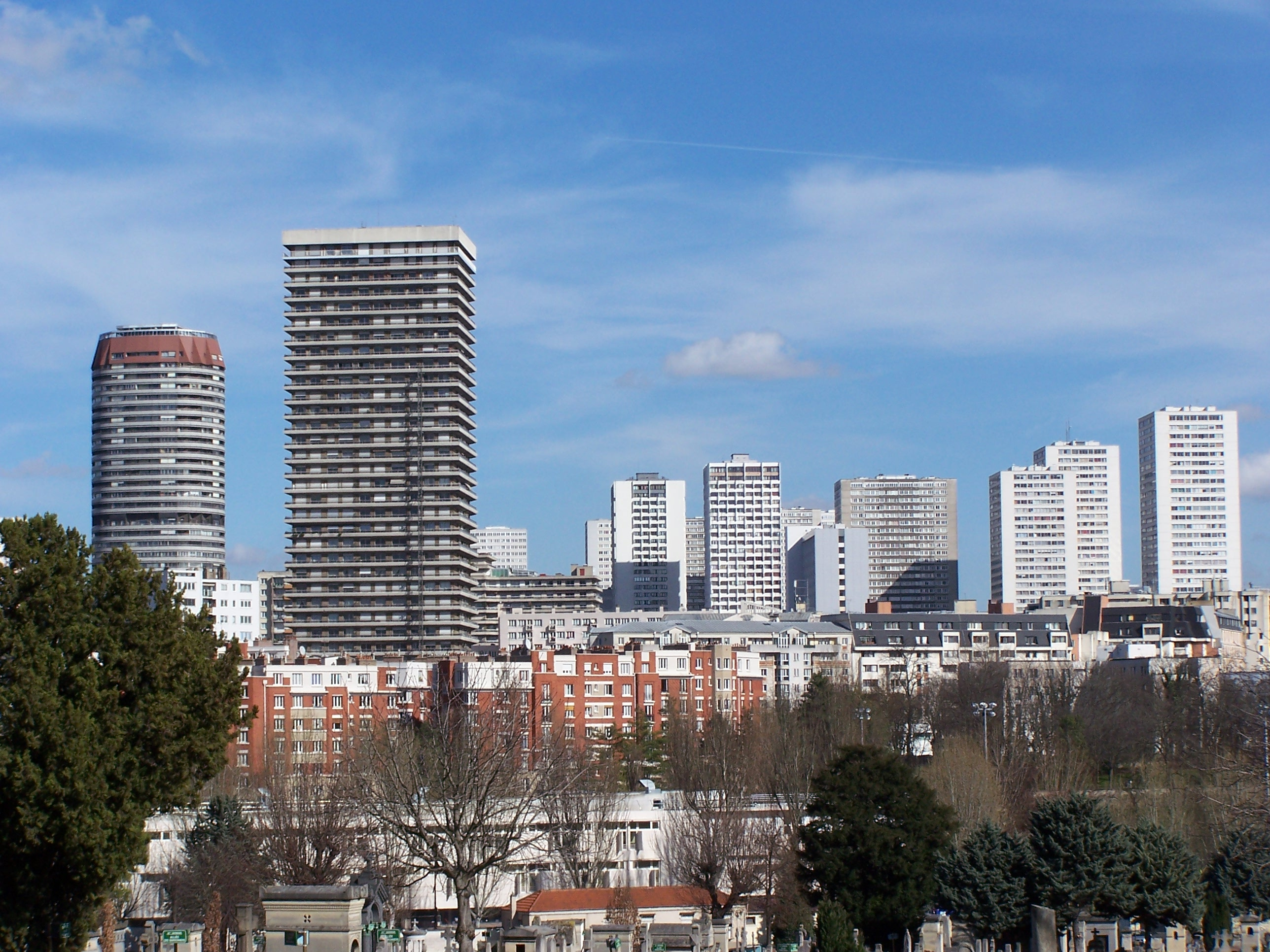
New towers in the 13th arrondissement

Two of the projects of residential towers were especially large; 29 hectares along the banks of the Seine at Beaugrenelle, and 87 hectares between Place de l'Italie and Tolbiac. Blocks of old buildings were torn town and replaced with residential towers. Between 1959 and 1968, the old Montparnasse railway station was demolished and rebuilt nearby, making a large parcel of land available for construction. The municipal council learned of the project only indirectly, through a message from the ministry in charge of construction projects. The first plan, proposed in 1957, was a new headquarters for Air France, a state-owned enterprise, in a tower 150 meters high. In 1959, the proposed height was increased to 170 meters. In 1965, to protect the views in the historic part of the city, the municipal council declared that the new building should be shorter, so it would not be visible from the esplanade of Les Invalides. In 1967, the Prefect of Paris, representing the government of President de Gaulle, overruled the municipal council decision, and raised the height to two hundred meters, to create more rentable office space. The new building, built between 1969 and 1972, was (and still is) the tallest building within the city limits.

=== The creation of La Défense ===
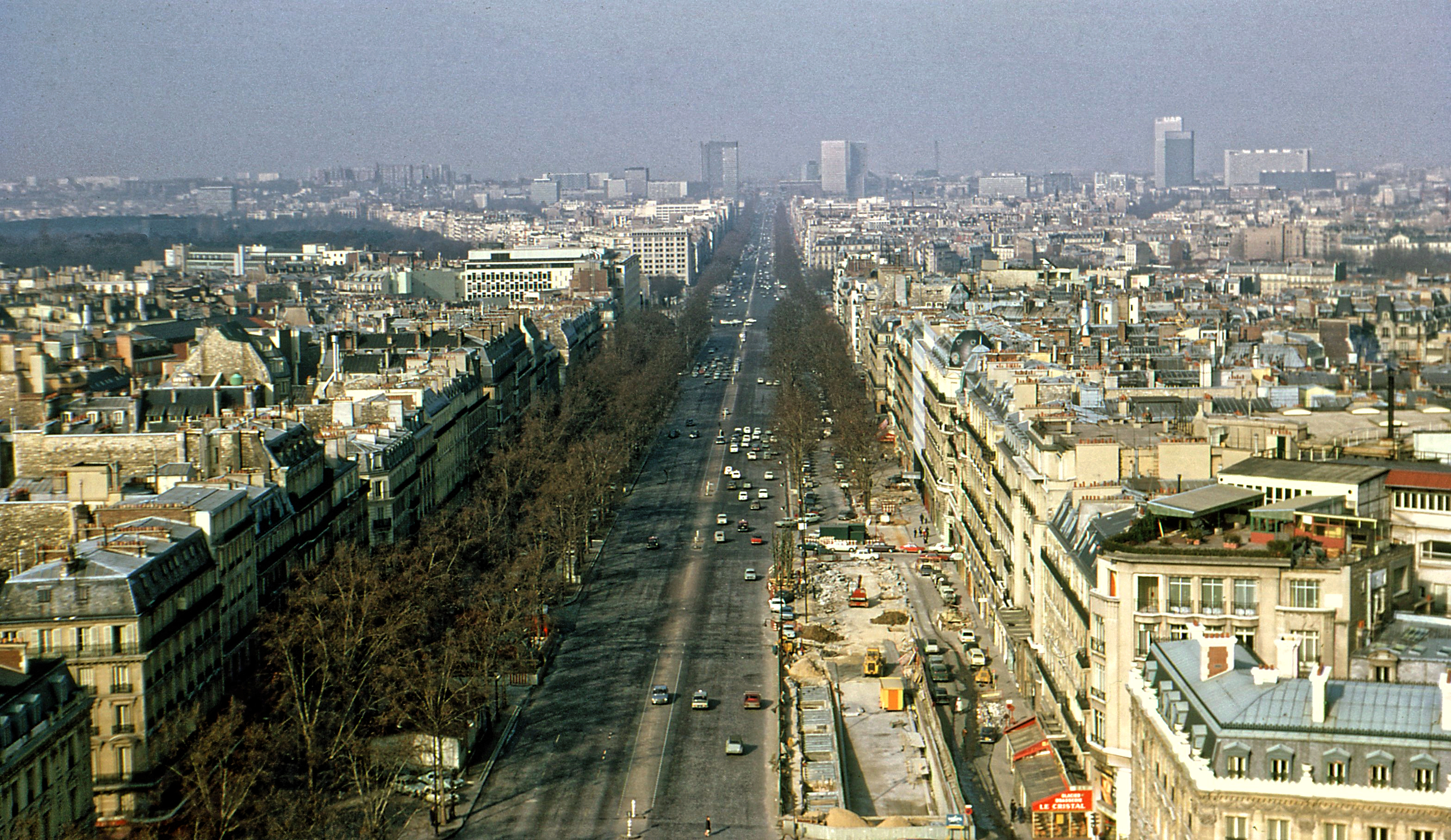
View of La Défense from the Arc de Triomphe in 1970, with the first towers

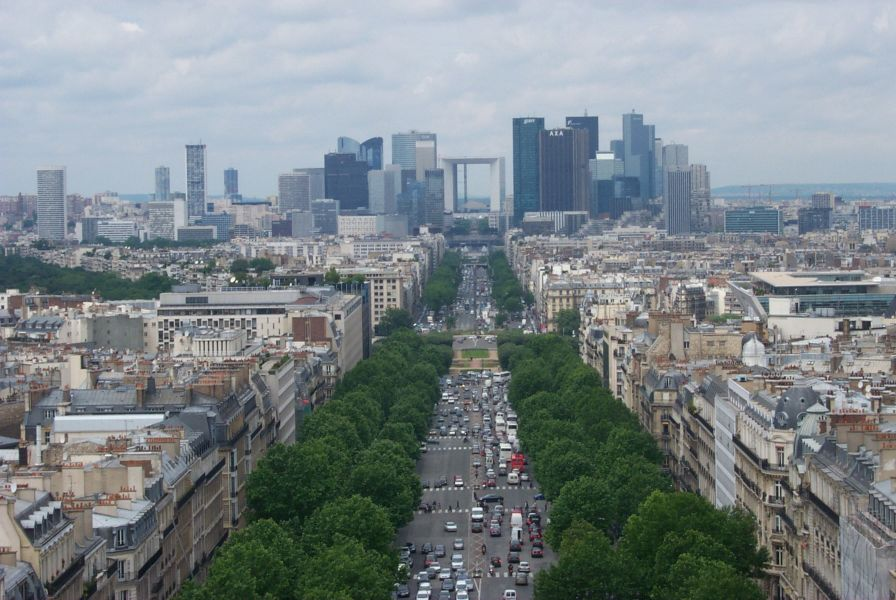
The same view of La Défense from the Arc de Triomphe in 1999

The most important project of de Gaulle's government was the construction of a new business district at La Défense, just west of the city limits. The idea was to create a new business center, since there was no more room to build in the traditional business center, around the Opera; and also to extend the historic axis of the city, an imaginary east-west line which ran from the porte-Maillot at the eastern edge of the city to Place de la Bastille, to the Louvre, and through the Place de la Concorde along the Champs Élysées to the Arc de Triomphe. It allowed the creation of a French version of Manhattan, without disturbing the skyline and architecture of the historic center of the city. The idea had been discussed and various proposals put forward as early as the 1930s, but did not begin to move ahead until 1957. A site of nine hundred hectares, between two cemeteries, between Paris and Nanterre, was chosen. The first company to move to the site was Elf Aquitaine, the largest French company; they had little choice, since they were owned by the French government. It was also decided to add residential buildings, since there was not yet a Métro line, and so that the regional train line was not overwhelmed with commuters.

Some of the more daring components of the original plan were dropped because of public opposition or cost. A planned 250-meter-high skyscraper by the architect Zehrfuss was reduced in height. The famed modernist architect Le Corbusier was commissioned to design a huge cultural center near the Rond-point de La Défense, with a museum of 20th century art, a music conservatory, and the national school of architecture, but this component was never built. The Museum of 20th century art instead became a museum of 19th century art, and was installed in the former Gare d'Orsay train station. The project developed slowly; most of the towers did not go up until the 1970s, and formed a backdrop to the Arc de Triomphe. By 2000 more than a million square meters of office space was created at La Défense, more than in the old central business district around the Opera.

=== New Chinatowns ===
The building of the new residential towers coincided with the departure of the French from Indochina, and the beginning of a large-scale new immigration to Paris. A large number of Vietnamese and ethnic Chinese from Saigon moved into the new residential towers, and created what became the largest Chinatown within the city limits. A smaller Indochinese community, had been created between the wars around Place Maubert, but its growth was limited by the rapid rise in real estate prices. An even larger Indochinese migration settled in the newly created town of Marne-la-Vallée. After the end of the Vietnam War in the 1970s, the new town attracted a large migration of Vietnamese and Cambodians, making it the largest southeast Asian community in the Paris region.

=== The suburbs and the ZUPs ===
In the suburbs of Paris, the process of de-industrialization was already under way before de Gaulle. Under the Fourth Republic, enterprises had been required to get government approval for every new industrial building over 500 square meters, and to pay heavy charges to subsidize transportation and other services. The government also paid a subsidy for the demolition of old factory buildings. The rising price of land was a major factor in the move of industry out of the city and the suburbs to other regions. Between 1960 and 1966, 352,000 square meters of industrial buildings was destroyed a year, while only 295,000 square meters was built. By 1960, the industrial space of the Paris region represented only 10 percent of the national total.

The construction of public housing projects in the suburbs of Paris accelerated and took on an even larger scale. The new projects, authorized by an August 1957 law, were called ZUPs, or Zones à urbaniser en priorité (Zones for priority urbanization). Unlike the earlier projects, these buildings included shops, schools and other services for their residents. By 1969, a dozen ZUPs had been built in the zone within thirty kilometers of Paris; they included about a hundred buildings altogether, with 300,000 housing units, occupied by about 1,400,000 residents. A single ZUP at Pantin had 1,700 units. Quantity and speed were the principal requirements in their constructions. They were welcomed and appreciated by the families who moved into them in the 1960s, since they resolved the housing crisis, but were not so much appreciated by the immigrants who moved into them decades later.

The building of new housing was combined with the construction of new highways. On April 12, 1960, the autoroute du Sud, a highway from Paris to the south of France, opened.

=== The Algerian War and terrorism in Paris ===
In the 1960s, Paris regularly became one of the battlegrounds of the Algerian War for independence from France. The two sides engaged were the FLN, or Algerian Front for National Liberation, and the OAS an armed terrorist group fighting to keep Algeria part of France. On January 6, the OAS set off a series of bombs at targets across the city. The FLN began a campaign of killing French policemen, targeting the Muslim policemen who had been hired to fight the wave of terrorism. Thirteen policemen were killed between August 29 and October 3. On October 5, the Paris municipality imposed a curfew on young Algerian men, advising them to be off the streets between 8:30 p.m. and 5:30 a.m. On October 17, to protest the curfew, the FLN and their ally, the French Communist Party, organized a demonstration of four columns converging in the center of the city. The police blocked the march and arrested six to seven thousand persons. Some of the demonstrators were trapped by the police on the Pont Saint-Michel, and a number jumped or were thrown off the bridge. The number of persons killed was never reliably established; estimates vary widely from between thirty and fifty dead to the Communist estimate of hundreds killed. (See Paris massacre of 1961.)

The FLN and Communists held another demonstration February 8. It was broken up by the police, and eight persons were killed, most of them crushed by the crowd trying to take sanctuary in the Charonne metro station. (see Charonne Métro Station massacre.)

On August 22, 1962, the OAS targeted de Gaulle himself. As he was being driven from Paris to the military airport at Villacoublay, an OAS assassination squad of trained soldiers with machine guns was waiting at the traffic circle at Petit-Clamart, just outside the city. They opened fire on the General's car, shooting 150 rounds, of which fourteen struck the car. Thanks to the skilled driving of de Gaulle's chauffeur, and the poor marksmanship of the gunmen, neither the General, his wife, nor the live chickens they were carrying in the trunk of car for the family kitchen, were harmed. The leader of the attack squad was arrested a month later, tried, and shot by a firing squad on March 11, 1963. (see Petit-Clamart attack)

=== The 1968 uprising ===
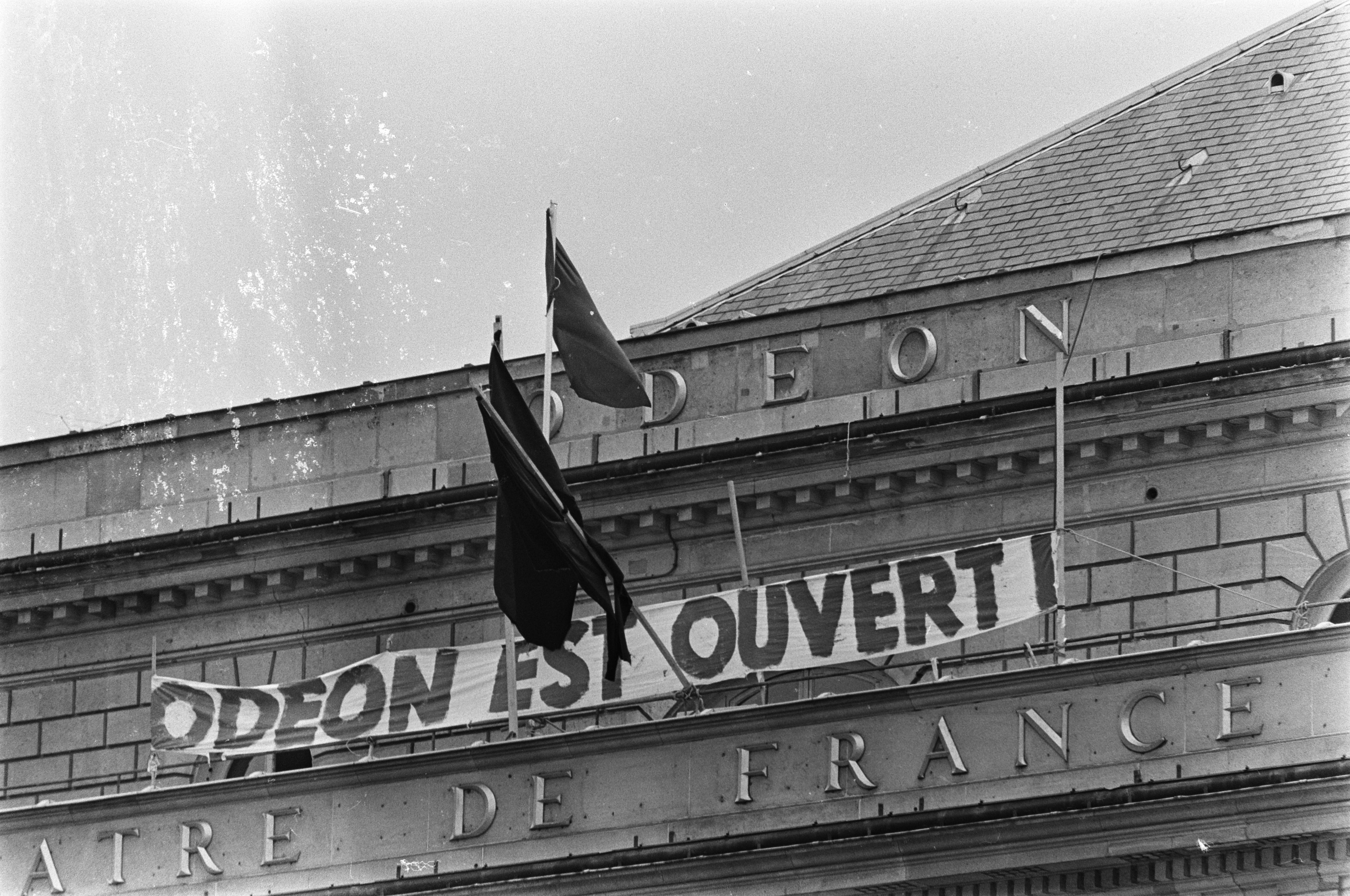
Red flags on the Odeon Theatre, occupied by demonstrators (May 1968).

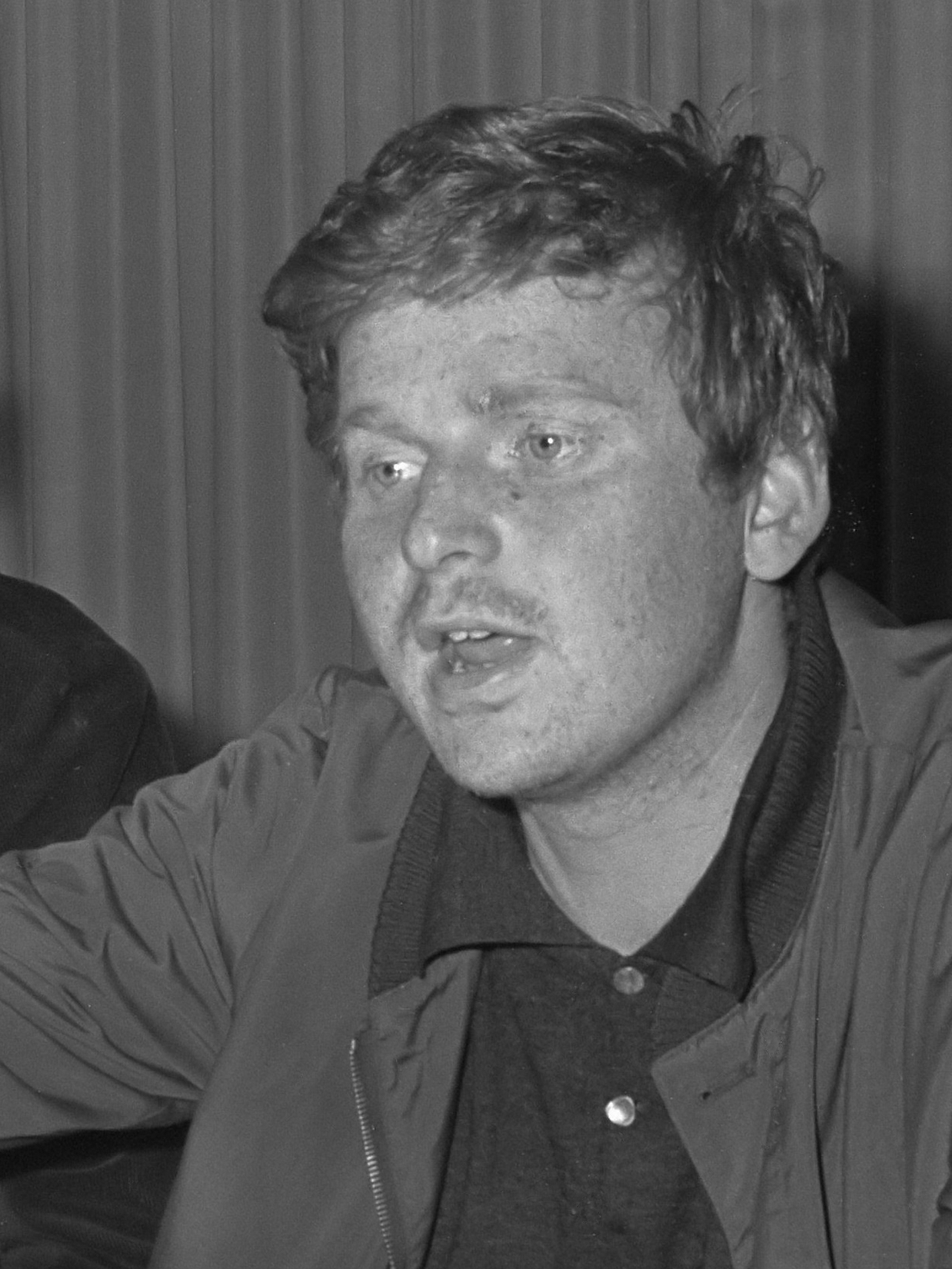
Daniel Cohn-Bendit (1968)

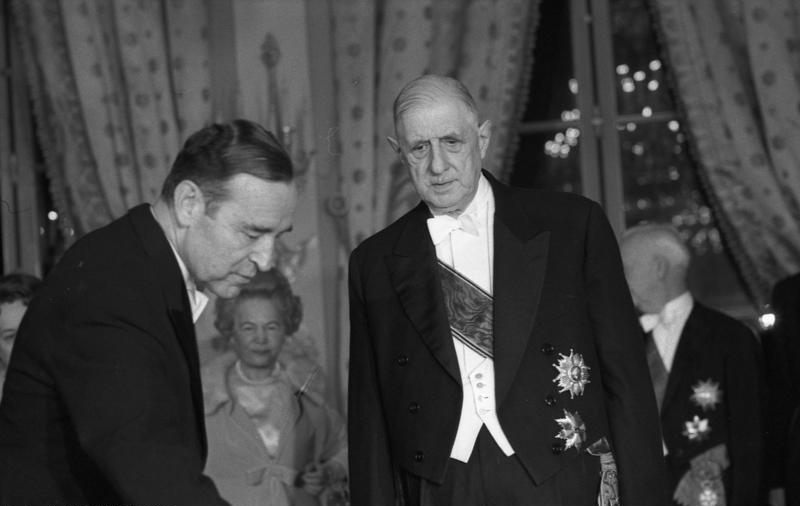
General de Gaulle at the German Embassy in Paris (Feb. 3, 1968)

In May 1968, Paris was the scene of a student uprising and general strike which briefly paralyzed the city, and had a profound impact on French society. The events began on May 3, 1968, with a sit-in-demonstration by students at the Nanterre campus of the University of Paris, demanding reforms in the university. In the afternoon The CRS riot police were summoned to clear the building. That evening, demonstrations began in the Latin quarter. The police cleared the street with tear gas and arrested six hundred demonstrators. The leaders, including a German Nanterre student, Daniel Cohn-Bendit, who had been born in Montauban in southern France to German-Jewish refugees, were quickly judged and sentenced to prison. At first the French Communist Party and the labor unions opposed the demonstrations; Georges Marchais, the lead of the Communist Party in France, called Cohn-Bendit "a German anarchist.' Student and non-student radical and anarchist groups organized a massive demonstration of twenty thousand persons on boulevard Saint-Michel, confronting the police. The demonstrators began to pull up cobblestones from the street and built barricades at rue Saint-Jacques, rue Le Goff, rue Claude-Bernard and rue gay-Lussac. Cars were overturned and added to the barricades, along with bicycles, benches, and anything else moveable, up to the first floor of the buildings along the street. By ten in the evening there were some sixty barricades in place. The CRS riot police waited until after two in the morning and then tried to clear the streets. The battle was fought with tear gas from the CRS and molotov cocktails from the demonstrators. By 5:30 am the streets were clear without fatalities, but 367 students had been injured and four students and ten policemen hospitalized in serious condition. President de Gaulle had gone to bed at ten in the evening and no one had awakened him; he learned of the events in the morning.

The major labor unions and the socialist party decided to join forces with the student demonstrators. On May 13 nine hundred thousand students and workers marched against the government of President DeGaulle, led by the leader of the Socialist party, François Mitterrand, and the leader of the Communist Party, Waldeck Rochet, and the heads of the two largest unions, the CGT and CDFT. A demonstration of an estimated nine hundred thousand took place on May 13, The demonstration ended with a huge sit-in around the Eiffel Tower. The workers of the major enterprises in and around Paris, including Renault, Rhône-Poulenc, Snecma, went on strike, followed by the workers of the railroads, the metro, and the postal service. Demonstrators occupied the buildings of the university. President de Gaulle made a secret half-day visit to the commander of the French army in Germany, then returned to Paris.

On May 25, Prime Minister Georges Pompidou, met with the unions at rue de Grenelle and proposed a series of measures, including wage increases and a reduction in working hours, to win over the unions. On the evening of May 27, the anti-government movements, including the trade unions, students, Maoists, anarchists, Communists and Socialists, held a large meeting at the Charléty stadium, firmly rejecting Pompidou's proposal. On May 28, François Mitterrand held a press conference to announce that there was a "vacuum of power", and call for the formation of a provisional government, followed by a new Presidential election, in which he would be a candidate.

President de Gaulle responded on May 29, making a radio address to the French people, declaring "I have a mandate from the people, and I will fulfill it." He dissolved the National Assembly, and called for new elections, blamed the demonstrators for causing chaos and the communists for trying to overthrow the government. The speech was followed on May 30, 1968, by a huge counter-demonstration of over one million people on the Champs Élysées supporting de Gaulle. Life in Paris gradually returned to normal; the last demonstrators were cleared from the university and barricades came down on June 11, and work resumed at the Renault factory at Billancourt on June 18. The national elections held on June 23 and June 28, were a triumph for de Gaulle; his party, the RPR, won 293 seats in the National Assembly out of 487, the first time a single party had an absolute majority in the French Parliament.

The events of May 1968 had two immediate effects on Paris; the five faculties of the University of Paris, founded in the 12th century was broken up in November 1968 into thirteen independent campuses; and the streets around the university were no longer paved with cobblestones, which had been used so extensively in the building of barricades.

President de Gaulle's triumph did not last long. In September, he proposed a major restructuring of the French regions, and a reduction of power of the French Senate, and put his plan to vote in a national referendum, promising to resign if it did not pass. All the opposition parties, and many within de Gaulle's own party, opposed the change. The referendum was held on April 27, 1969. and the "no" vote was fifty-three percent. De Gaulle, as he had promised, immediately resigned. New elections were held in June, and the Prime Minister, Georges Pompidou, was elected President, taking 58 percent of the vote in the second round.

== Paris under Pompidou (1969–1974) ==
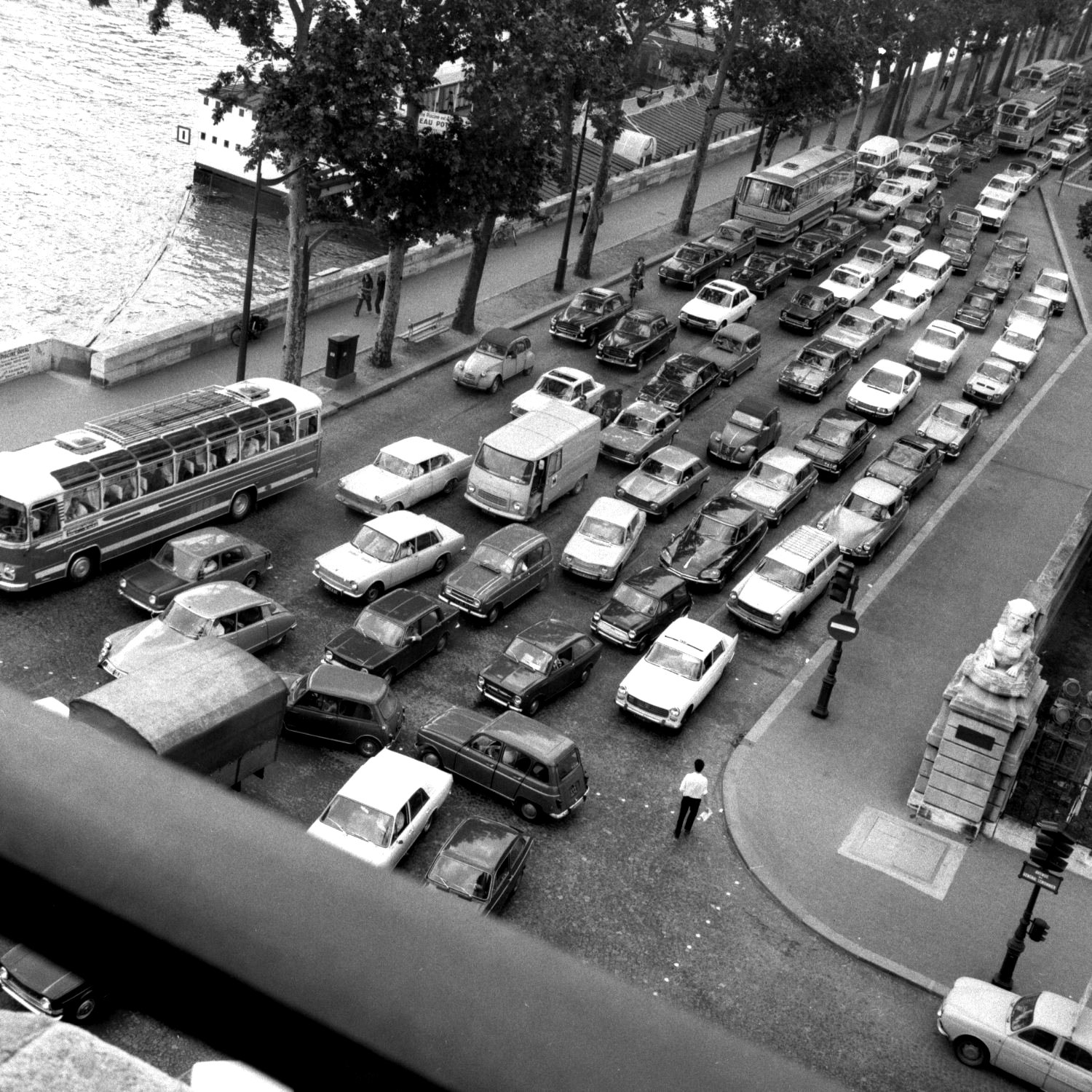
Traffic on the Quai des Tuilieries (1970)

"Paris must adapt to the automobile", President Pompidou declared. In the 1960s the population of the city and the surrounding suburbs had grown to 8 million inhabitants, and 150,000 migrants were arriving each year, both from other regions of France and abroad. Automobiles, very few in number in the 1950s, having an automobile became a status symbol celebrated in the French cinema, and they become more and more common; yet the French state had built only 29 kilometers of highways; portions of the autoroutes to the west and south and to Sceaux. No highways came into the center of Paris. A district of Paris had been created in 1961, comprising the city and the suburbs, three departments and 1,305 communes. A regional transit system, the RER (Reseau express regional) to serve the suburbs had been begun in 1961, and the first line began to operate in 1969, but the planners had underestimated the number of passengers; the passengers coming by the RER to the Gare de Lyon and to Chatelet, the main stations connecting to the metro, jammed the metro stations and cars.

To move the workers of the suburbs into the city more efficiently, the government proposed a new urban plan at the end of the 1960s. It called for the construction of twelve highways radiating out of Paris; raising the periphericboulevard around the city limits of Paris so that traffic moved more quickly; and constructing two new "peripheric"' ring highways, the A86 and A87, around the city. The new plan, developed between 1966 and 1969, called for the construction of eight new cities around Paris, each with a population of between 150,000 and 300,000 residents. They would be connected with Paris by highways running parallel with the Seine to the north and the south of the city. Five of the eight new cities were constructed between 1969 and 1973: Évry, Cergy (1969), Saint-Quentin-en-Yvelines (1970); Marne-la-Vallée (1972), and Melun and Sénart (1973). The new cities were expected to hold a total of five million persons within twenty years.

The Pompidou Center, the city's major museum of modern art (1977), surprised Parisians by putting all its internal plumbing and infrastructure on the outside.

The 1960s had also seen a gradual departure of industry from the Paris suburbs to just outside the Paris region, to Rouen, Le Mans, Orléans, and Reims. As part of the program of decentralization, several prestigious educational institutions, including the École Polytechnique, the HEC Paris business school, and the École des ponts et chaussées were also moved from the center of the city out to the suburbs. Other measures were put into place to decentralize the economy, and to encourage businesses to move outside the Paris region, including a new tax on office space. Between 1962 and 1968, the number of employees in Paris, particularly industrial workers, declined by 1.2 percent, while it grew in other regions of France.

During the Pompidou years, the shift of the Paris regional economy from industry to services accelerated. Between 1969 and 1973, the number of workers involved in production dropped from 52.7 percent to 49.9 percent, and those involved in services grew from 46.4 percent to 49.2 percent. Between 1971 and 1973, Paris industry, largely in the suburbs, lost 42,000 industrial jobs and gained 172,000 jobs.

Pompidou was a scholar and a great admirer of modern art. He edited an anthology of French poetry, decorated his office at the Matignon with modern art. His apartment on the Île-de-la-Cité was filled with 20th-century art. His major legacy was the Pompidou Centre at Beaubourg, opened in 1977 after his death, an ultramodern showcase of the contemporary arts, whose pipes, escalators ducts and other internal workings were exposed outside of the building.

== Paris under Giscard (1974–1981) ==
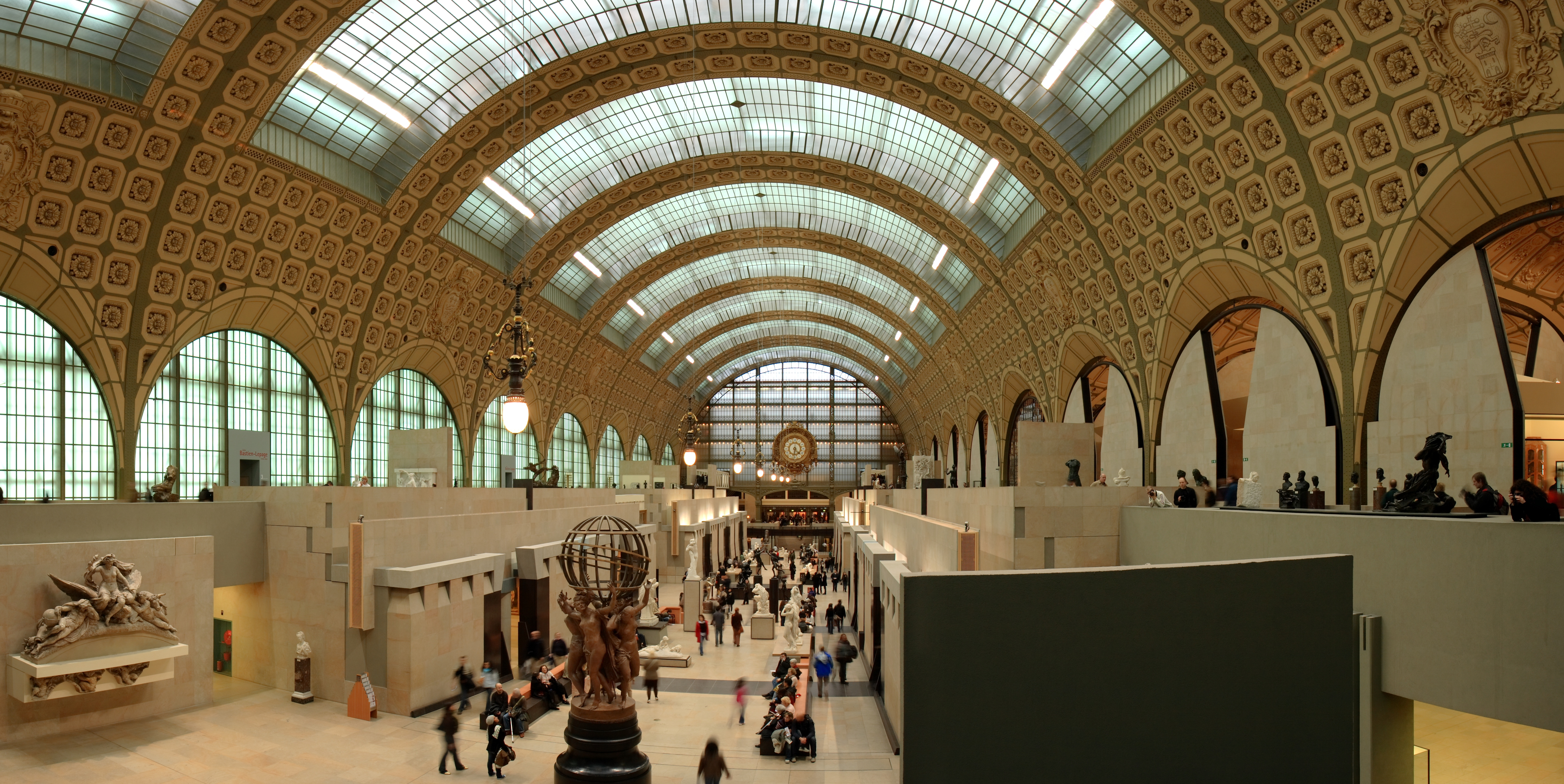
Giscard began the conversion of the Gare d'Orsay railroad station into the Musée d'Orsay

Pompidou's successor, Valéry Giscard d'Estaing, was elected President on May 19, 1974, narrowly defeating François Mitterrand with 50.81 percent of the vote. His style was very different from that of previous French Presidents; he eliminated the formal costume worn by earlier Presidents on ceremonial occasions, and wore an ordinary business suit instead, and he invited the public into the Élysées Palace on the July 14, the national holiday.

The environmental or green movement had arrived in Europe at the end of the 1960s and quickly became a political force in Paris; the Green Party competed for the first time in the Presidential elections of 1974. Giscard, an adroit politicians, quickly adopted pro-environment policies. He declared, "The era of concrete at any price is over." He proposed an eighteen-point pro-environmental policy, taking positions against "the proliferation of towers" and the "excesses of the automobile." He called for preservation of green space, less population density and giving priority to public transport and pedestrian streets. A number of tower and highway projects were downsized or cancelled. Rather than building new monuments, he suggested redesigning old buildings for new uses; his most visible and successful project was the conversion of the Gare d'Orsay railway station into the Musée d'Orsay for art of the 19th century; it was opened in 1986 under President Mitterrand. He also launched a plan to transform the area of slaughterhouses at La Villette into a par a containing a new museum of science and technology, the Cité des Sciences et de l'Industrie (1986). He also observed that the ring of suburbs around the city had plenty of residential towers but few cultural institutions; he funded the creation of two hundred cultural centers and music conservatories in the suburbs.

Giscard's most important political reform in Paris was the recreation of the office of Mayor, which had been abolished by Napoleon. Since that time, the Presidents of France had personally chosen the prefects who governed the city. the law was changed on December 31, 1975. The first mayoral election in 1977 was won by Jacques Chirac, the former Prime Minister. Chirac served as Mayor of Paris for eighteen years, until 1995, when he was elected President of the Republic.

Giscard's misfortune was that his term in office coincided with a global economic crisis and serious downturn in the French economy, and the end of thirty years of rapid and uninterrupted economic growth known as the Trentes Glorieuse. The French economy had been growing by six percent a year between 1969 and 1973; growth dropped to three percent between 1973 and 1979. Unemployment grew by 1981 to nine percent, a record high. In 1981, after one term as President, Giscard was defeated by the socialist candidate, François Mitterrand.

== Paris under Mitterrand (1981–1995) ==
On May 10, 1981, François Mitterrand became the first socialist leader of the Fifth Republic, defeating Giscard with 51.8 percent of the vote. The socialists and communists also swept the elections for the National Assembly in June in what became known as the Rose Vague or "Pink wave". He promised to "Change the life" of Parisians and the French population, included four communist ministers in his government, and began with a series of radical economic reforms. He nationalized many of the largest enterprises in France, including the largest five industrial groups, and forty major banks, as well as insurance companies. He raised the minimum wage and family benefits, added a fifth week of paid vacation, lowered the retirement age to 60, shortened the work week to 39 hours, added 150,000 employees to the public payroll, and created a new tax on those with large fortunes. In a move to decentralize the French government, he shifted a number of government responsibilities from the national government to the regions, including the new Île-de-France region. The economic reforms did not have their intended effect; unemployment rose to two million by 1983, and high costs caused more industry to leave the Paris region. In Paris, the traditional fortress of left-wing parties, Mayor Jacques Chirac, from the right wing, was reelected Mayor in the municipal elections of March 1983. Mitterrand modified his economic policies, removed the communists from his government, and succeeded in winning re-election as President over Chirac in

Mitterrand's presidency is best remembered for his Grands Travaux, or "Great works" in Paris, a series of monumental cultural projects. He had fourteen years in power, enough time to complete more projects than any president since Napoleon III, and he sometimes personally selected the architects of his projects. His Grands Travaux included finishing the extension of the City of Sciences and Industry at La Villette, begun by Giscard (Mitterrand dedicated the Géode, the symbol of the park on June 6, 1985), the Musée d'Orsay, begun by Giscard (1986); the Institut du Monde Arabe, by architect Jean Nouvel, finished in 1987; the Grand Louvre, including the glass pyramid designed by I. M. Pei (inaugurated 14 October 1988); the Grande Arche of La Défense (inaugurated July 1989); the Opéra Bastille, by architect Carlos Ott, opened on July 13, 1989, the day before the bicentennial of the French Revolution; and the new French National Library, now called the Bibliothèque François Mitterrand, which Mitterrand personally dedicated on March 30, 1995, in his last official appearance before his death. He also constructed more new parks and fountains than any French head of state since Napoleon III, including the colorful Stravinsky Fountain next to the Centre Pompidou, Parc André Citroën (on the site of a former Citroen factory), and Parc de Bercy on the site of the former wholesale wine depot. Most of the new parks were located in the outer arrondissements of the city, which had less green space than the center.

Pyramid of the Grand Louvre (1988)

The Opéra Bastille (1989)

The Grande Arche of La Défense (1989)

== Paris under Chirac (1995–2000) ==
The Musée du quai Branly, the major cultural project of President Chirac

On May 7, 1995, Mayor Jacques Chirac won the second round of the French presidential elections, taking 60 percent of the vote in Paris. On June 22, Jean Tiberi, the Deputy Mayor, was formally selected Mayor by the Municipal Council. Tiberi followed the urban policies begun by Chirac, but his term was disturbed by a prolonged investigation into the attribution of government-owned Paris apartments at low rents to activists of Chirac's political party.

The last of François Mitterrand's grand projects, the four book-like towers of the Bibliothèque nationale de France in Bercy, was opened in May, 1996. President Chirac's own grand project, the Musée du quai Branly, a new museum of the arts of non-European cultures, was planned and land acquired.

In 1996, Paris again became a battleground of a foreign conflict. This time the war between the Algerian government and the Armed Islamic Group of Algeria. On June 25, 1996, a bomb exploded at the RER train at the Saint-Michel station, killing seven persons and injuring eighty-four. Another bomb exploded on August 17 in a garbage can on Avenue de Friedland at corner with Place Charles de Gaulle-Étoile, injuring seventeen people; a bombing on October 6 near the metro station Maison-Blanche, and a further bombing on October 17 of an RER train between Musée d'Orsay and Saint-Michel stations injured twenty persons. In response, the French government began armed patrols by soldiers in train stations and other public places.

In the last years of the century, Paris was the scene of an epic tragedy: the death of Diana, Princess of Wales in an automobile accident in the Pont de l'Alma road tunnel on August 31, 1997. The tunnel became a pilgrimage site for thousands of visitors. The next year Parisians celebrated the victory of France at the 1998 FIFA World Cup at the Stade de France in Saint-Denis. France defeated holders Brazil 3–0 in the final, with two goals from Zinedine Zidane and a stoppage time strike from Emmanuel Petit. The win gave France their first World Cup title. The Champs Élysées was filled with tens of thousands of jubilant Parisians and visitors celebrating far into the night.

The beginning of the new century at midnight between December 31, 1999, and January 1, 2000, saw a new sight on the Paris skyline: the Eiffel Tower was covered for the first time with sparkling lights.

== Demographics ==
The population of Paris had fallen during the war, but grew back quickly afterwards, despite the shortage of housing; the city grew by about 50,000 persons a year between 1946 and 1952. The birthrate in France was extremely high during this period; 800,000 persons were born in France during 1946, and a similar number in 1947 and 1948. Those under 20 years of age numbered thirty percent of the French population in 1936; it grew to thirty-six percent by 1962. In the 1960s, the population remained relatively stable; the number of retired persons departing was matched by young persons arriving in Paris from other parts of France and abroad. Between 1968 and 1975, the number of new arrivals in the region dropped to 114,000, and between 1975 and 1982, the population of the region fell by 273,000. With the economic crisis in the 1970s, the birthrate on France fell; it dropped by 18 percent between 1972 and 1976. The population of the city of Paris continued to decline slowly through the rest of the 20th century, not increasing again until 2008.

=== Immigration ===
Large-scale immigration to France resumed after the War, particularly as the French economy began to grow and workers were needed. In 1962, immigrants were estimated to comprise eight percent of the population of Paris. The largest number were Italians, followed by immigrants from Spain and Poland, then Russians, Armenians and Germans.

However, a wave of immigrants from the French colonies of Algeria, Tunisia and Morocco soon outnumbered all the others. The first North African workers had arrived in Paris in 1894, to work beside Belgians and Italians in the construction of the Paris Metro. They were first recorded in the official Paris census of 1904. A much larger migration of about half a million men arrived during the First World War, some to fight in the Army (twenty-one regiments were formed, and some thirty thousand North African soldiers were killed), and others to work in the armaments factories, public transport, and construction, replacing French workers who had been drafted into the army. By the end of the war there were about 60,000 Algerians, 75,000 Moroccans and 15,000 Tunisians in Paris. In 1925 the French government created a new system for bringing in migrant workers, mostly from the Kabyle region of Algeria. They had work contracts for a limited period of time, came without families and traveled back and forth between Algeria and France. Workers had to show a work contract, a marriage certificate or that they had purchased a small business to remain in France. By 1938, due to government restrictions, the number of North African workers in Paris was estimated by the Prefecture at seventy thousand. When World War II began, about one hundred thousand North African soldiers were mobilized to fight for France; eighty thousand were taken prisoner, and five thousand were killed. Between 1943 and 1945, thousands of Algerian and other North African soldiers served in the Free French forces of General de Gaulle.

Immediately after the war, immigration to France resumed; workers were needed to reconstruct the infrastructure destroyed in the War, and to get factories working again. In the early 1960s, as Algeria, Morocco and Tunisia gained independence from France, about 100,000 workers from the Maghreb came each year under government-to-government agreements to work in Paris, usually staying for two or three years. Most came without families, and lived in crowded shantytowns, called Bidonvilles, outside the city; one of the largest was located between Paris and Nanterre, where the La Défense business district is located today. With the sharp downturn of the global and French economy in 1974, the program of bringing North African workers to France was halted; but the great majority of the North Africans already in France chose to stay, and, when they could, to bring their families to France. They were joined by thousands of immigrants from French colonies in sub-Saharan Africa when they gained their independence. Between 1975 and 1990, the number of immigrants living in the Paris region increased from 13.5 percent of the population to 16 percent.

== The economy ==
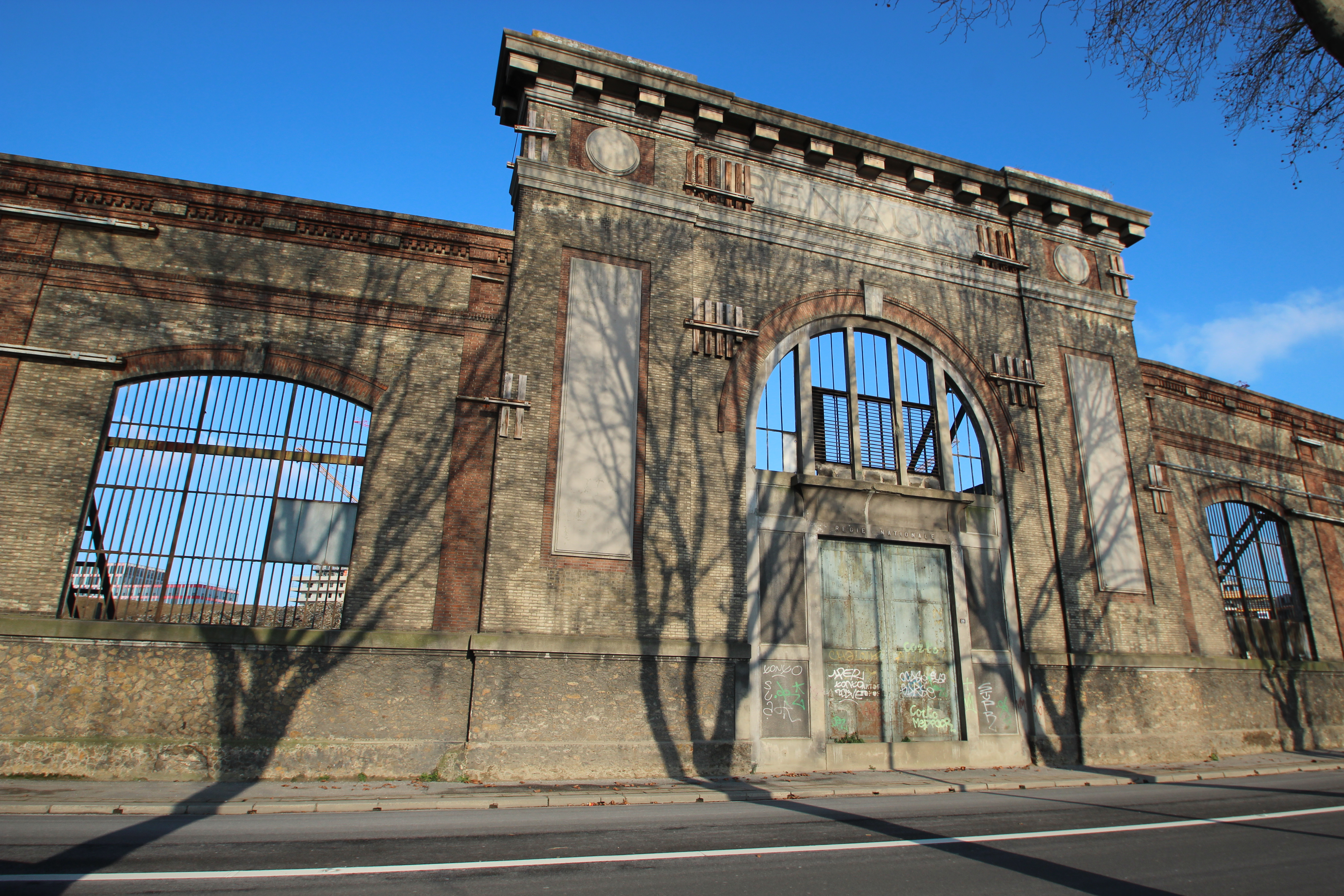
The gateway of the Renault Factory in Boulogne-Billancourt, once among the largest factories in the Paris region, closed in 1992

The war had ruined the engines of the Paris economy; the factories, train stations and railroad yards around the city had been bombed by the Allies, there was little coal for heat, electricity was sporadic at best. Nonetheless, the reconstruction went ahead rapidly, aided by 2.6 billion dollars in grants and loans from the United States given under the Marshall Plan between 1948 and 1953, administered locally from the Hotel Talleyrand on the Place de la Concorde, which allowed France to finance two-thirds of its exterior debt and to buy new machinery for its factories.

Even before the war ended, the government had begun nationalizing much of the Paris industry; between 1944 and 1946 it nationalized the Renault factory, the coal mines and oil companies, Air France, and all the major banks and insurance companies. An important part of the planning of the new economy was conducted by Jean Monnet between 1946 and 1951; Monnet used the lessons learned to create the European Common Market. By 1948, French industrial production had come back to its prewar level. The 1950s were the beginning of the Trente Glorieuses, almost thirty years of rapid and steady growth. Between 1951 and 1968, the French economy grew at an average rate of 5 percent a year, reaching 6.5 percent between 1966 and 1968. The need for more workers led to increasing numbers of immigrants, coming mostly from North Africa on labor contracts.

In the 1970s, the Trente Glorieuses came to an end. Under the pressure from trade unions, salaries and the cost of production grew quickly (7.1 percent in 1969, 6.3 percent in 1970, 8.5 percent in 1973), even faster than inflation (4 percent between 1960 and 1968); gradually, even with increases in productivity, goods made in France were more expensive than those made in Germany, Britain, the United States and Japan. French industry had difficult being competitive, even with modernization. The Citroen assembly line in Paris had closed in the 1970s. The Renault assembly line at Billancourt, one of the biggest factories in the Paris region, closed permanently in 1992. The rapid and unexpected increase in oil prices after the 1973 Arab-Israeli War also hit the French economy hard. In the early 1980s the cost of imports into France grew twice as quickly as the value of French exports. The Mitterrand government responded with a new wave of nationalizations of major French banks, industrial companies, and manufacturers including Thomson, Saint-Gobain, and Rhône-Poulenc. However, beginning 1986, the Mitterrand government decided to reverse course, and privatized most of the companies it had earlier taken over. Between 1983 and 1986, the unemployment rate passed 10 percent and the number of unemployed grew from 1.9 million to 2.5 million.

Between 1988 and 1995, the Paris economy recovered some of its earlier growth; inflation was kept low, labor costs grew less quickly, but unemployment remained stubbornly high, particularly in the Paris suburbs.

=== Commerce and the department stores ===
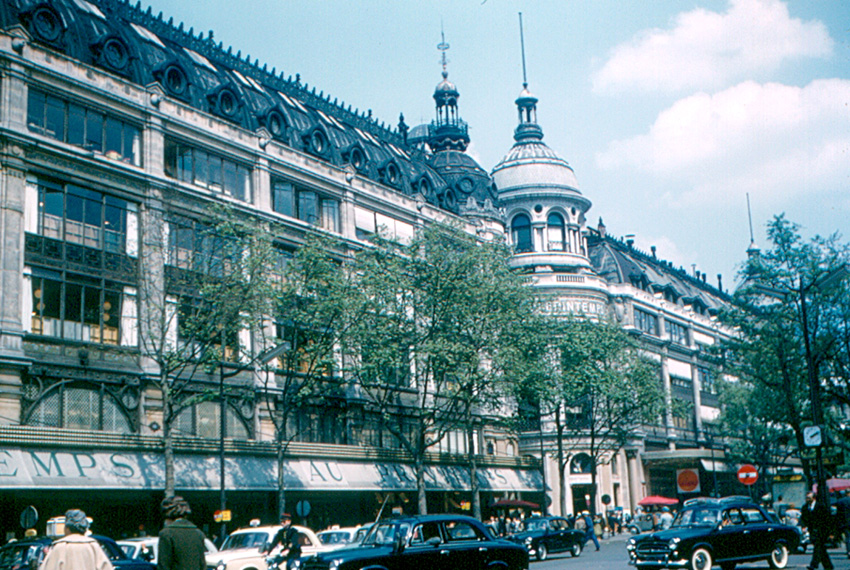
Printemps department store in 1960

Before the War the grands magazine or department stores of Paris, including Galeries Lafayette, Printemps, Grands Magasins du Louvre, Au Bon Marché, Bazar de l'Hôtel de Ville (BHV), Grands Magasins Dufayel, and La Samaritaine, were the flagships of Paris commerce, serving Parisians and foreign visitors. However, after the war, they faced increasing competition, especially between 1970 and 1980, from big new hyper-marchés or shopping malls in the Paris suburbs, from growing costs, and from the departure of the Parisian middle class to the suburbs. By 1995, only five; Galeries Lafayette, Printemps, BHV, Samaritaine and Bon Marché, were still in business, and they were catering increasingly to wealthy tourists.

=== High fashion and luxury goods ===
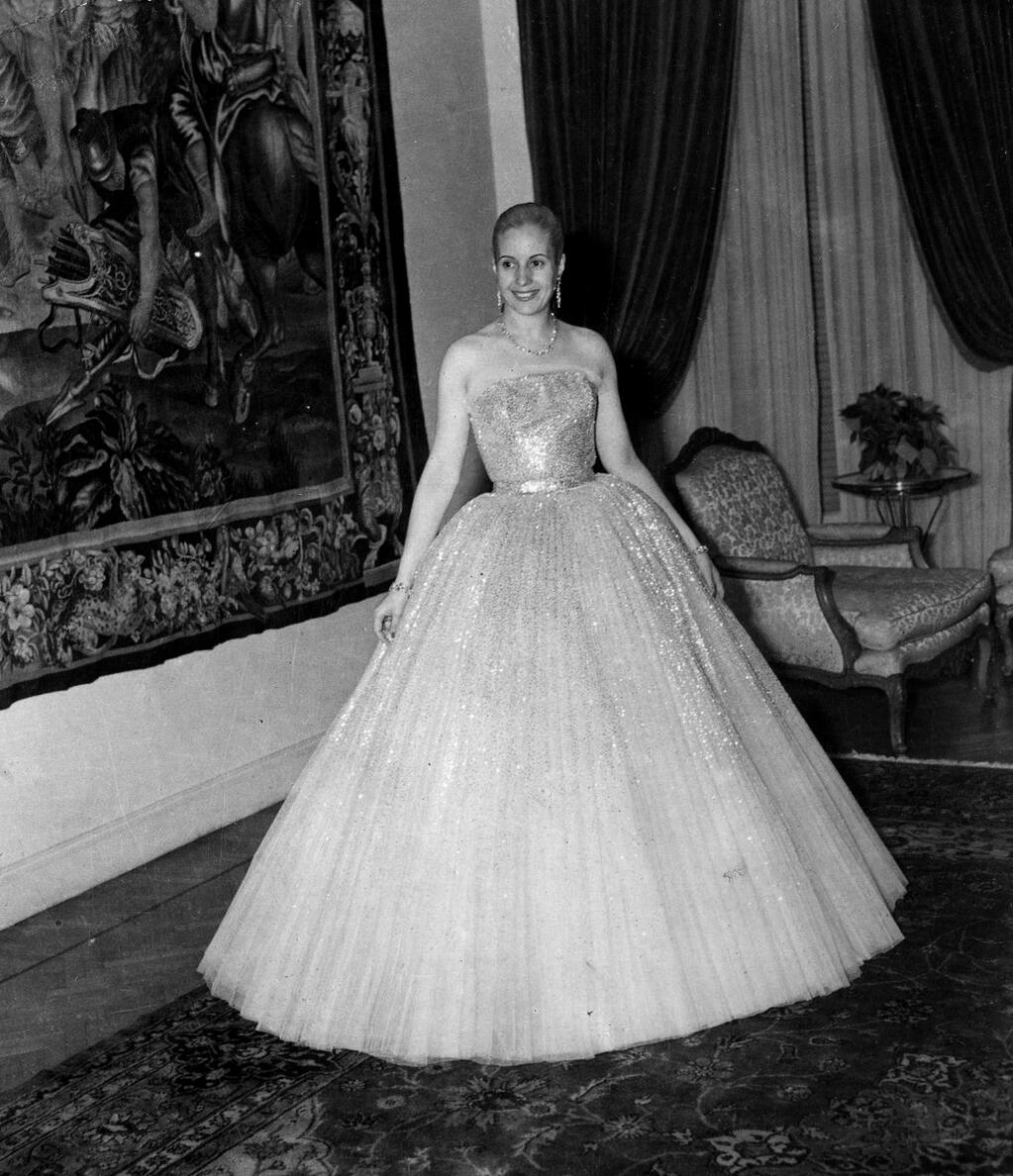
A gown designed by Christian Dior worn by Eva Perón (1950)

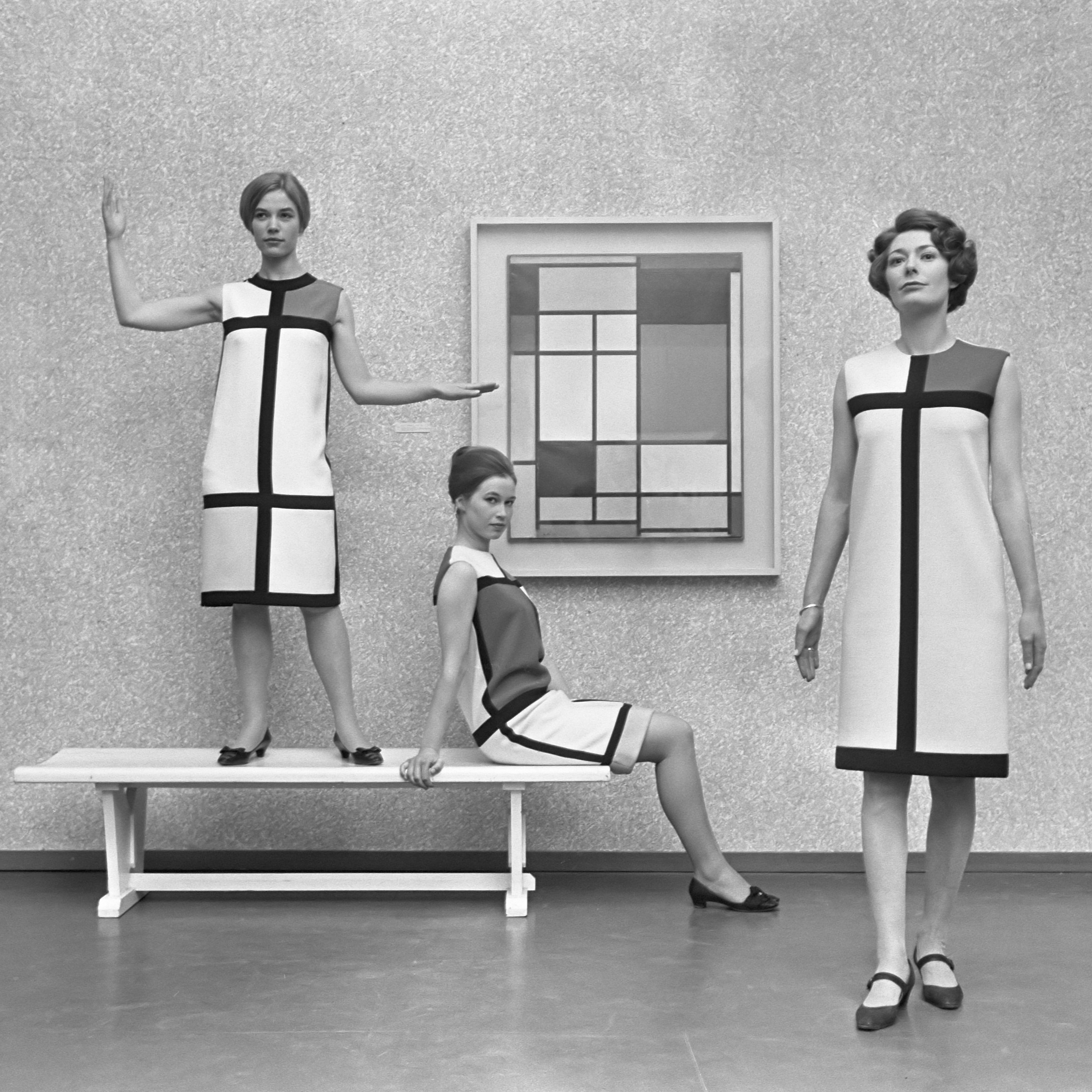
Dresses by Yves Saint-Laurent (1966)

Paris since the Middle Ages was famous for the production and commerce of luxury goods, including jewelry, watches, leather goods, and perfumes. Haute couture, or high fashion, had been largely dominated by French designers since the 18th century. The number of fashion houses in Paris had risen to seventy-two who exhibited at the 1925 Exposition of Decorative Arts, then, after the Depression, dropped to thirty-nine at the Pavilion of Elegance of the 1937 Paris Exposition. After the war, Christian Dior was the first designer to organize a major fashion show on February 12, 1947. Several designers from before the War, including Coco Chanel (who had gone to Switzerland in 1945, then returned to Paris in 1954), Elsa Schiaparelli, Balenciaga, and Nina Ricci re-opened salons, and were joined by other new designers; besides Dior, they included Jacques Fath, Yves Saint Laurent, Pierre Balmain, Pierre Cardin, Hubert de Givenchy, and Guy Laroche. The success of French designers, led by Dior, earned a significant amount of hard currency for the cash-strapped French economy.

Coco Chanel branched out from clothing into perfume in the 1920s, inventing Chanel No. 5. In 1955, she branched out again with a new design of a handbag, which was soon imitated, in various forms, by other designers.

By 1995, eighteen fashion houses in Paris had the resources to put on the necessary two major fashion shows a year: Carven, Dior, Chanel, Lapidus, Guy Laroche, Torrente, Givenchy, Christian Lacroix, Nina Ricci, Leconanet Hemant, Ungaro, Jean-Louis Scherrer, Pierre Balmain, Yves Saint-Laurent, Paco Rabanne, Louis Feraud, Pierre Cardin and Hanae Mori. The dominance of Paris designers was lessened over the years by increased competition from other cities, particularly Milan, New York, and London. Paris fashion designers also did not adapt so readily as the Italians and other designers to the growing global market for ready-to-wear clothes.

The 1980s saw the extraordinary and rapid consolidation of many Paris luxury companies into a few huge conglomerates. The biggest was LVMH. The company was formed by the 1987 merger of the fashion house Louis Vuitton with Moët Hennessy, a company formed after the 1971 mergers and acquisitions the champagne producer Moët & Chandon and Hennessy, the cognac manufacturer. LVMH itself was largely owned by another Paris luxury goods group, Christian Dior, which purchased 40.9% of its shares, and 59.01% of its voting rights. Bernard Arnault, majority shareholder of Dior, is Chairman of both companies and CEO of LVMH.

Another giant Paris luxury goods conglomerate created in the period was Kering (previously PPR), the owner of Alexander McQueen, Balenciaga, Brioni, Gucci, Puma, Volcom, and other luxury, sport & lifestyle brands. The company was founded in 1963 by businessman François Pinault and is now run by his son François-Henri Pinault.

The third luxury goods giant of the period was the cosmetics company L'Oréal, founded in 1909 by Eugène Schueller, a young chemist who had developed a hair dye formula called Auréale. In 1919, Schueller registered his company, the Société Française de Teintures Inoffensives pour Cheveux (Safe Hair Dye Company of France), which eventually became L’Oréal In 1920, the company employed three chemists. By 1950, the teams were 100 strong, and grew to the thousands of chemists by 1999; L'Oréal was (and remains in 2015) the largest cosmetics company in the world.

== Art and culture ==
=== Cinema and the New Wave ===
Paris was the birthplace of the motion picture- the first projected motion picture showing, by the Lumière brothers, took place in the basement of the Grand Café in Paris in 1895, and Paris had long been the home of the French film industry. One of the most acclaimed French films, Les Enfants du Paradis had been made in Paris during the War, with food and film in short supply and under very difficult conditions, but was not shown until 1945. The major French film studios after the war were located in the Paris suburbs, in Neuilly, Saint-Maurice, Boulogne, and Boulogne-Billancourt, and they resumed production after the war and the studios at were greatly enlarged. In 1954 there were 354 movie theaters with 240,000 seats in Paris, including the great movie palaces built in the 1930s; the Art Deco Rex theater (1930) and the Gaumont-Palace rebuilt in 1930, and sixty large movie theaters on the Champs-Élysées, the Grand Boulevards from La Madeleine to La République, and around Place Clichy. But by the 1960s the French film industry found it increasingly difficult to compete with the growing popularity of television. Between the 1960s and 1980s, the large theaters were subdivided into smaller viewing spaces. By 1980 there were 119 movie theaters with 239 screens. By 1990 there were only about one hundred movie theaters remaining in the city, of which sixty-seven had multiple screens. The only remaining clusters of movie theaters were found along the Champs-Élysées and on the Grands Boulevards, and in the Latin Quarter on the Left Bank. The studios also had to face the rising price of real estate in the Paris suburbs. Beginning in the 1960s, as more French films were made at locations outside the studios, one by one the old sound stages were torn down; the studios on rue de Silly in Boulogne was torn down in 1972 for real estate development, and the studio at Sant-Maurice was demolished at about the same time. In the 1980s, more modest and modern studios were built by the French Society of Production (SFP) at Bry-sur-Marne and by Studio 91 at Arpajon.

The 1950s saw the emergence of a number of Paris-based actors, including Gérard Philipe, Simone Signoret, Yves Montand, and Brigitte Bardot, whose films reached a global audience.

The late 1950s saw the birth in the city of the Nouvelle Vague, or "New Wave" of cinema; led by a group of young directors who rejected the methods of Hollywood and who shared their ideas in a journal called the Cahiers du Cinéma. The landmark films of the New Wave were The 400 Blows by François Truffaut (1959), Hiroshima mon amour by Alain Resnais (1959) and Breathless by Jean-Luc Godard (1960). Other prominent New Wave directors included Claude Chabrol, Éric Rohmer, and Jacques Rivette. Paris-based directors outside the New Wave who reached an international audience included Louis Malle and Roger Vadim. A new generation of actors came to the screen in the 1960s and 1970s, including Jean-Paul Belmondo, Alain Delon, Philippe Noiret, Lino Ventura, Catherine Deneuve and Romy Schneider, joined at the end of the period by Gérard Depardieu, Isabelle Adjani, Juliette Binoche and Audrey Tautou.

=== Jazz clubs of Saint-Germain-des-Prés ===
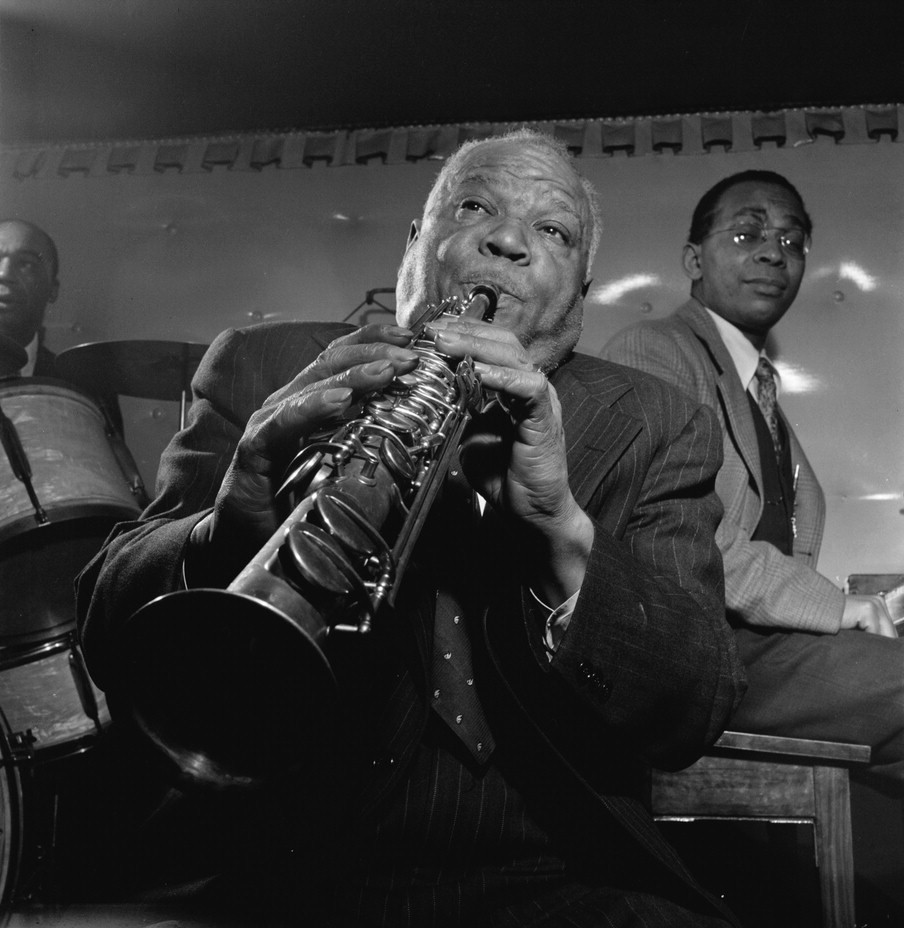
Jazz musician Sidney Bechet in 1947

Immediately after the war, the Saint-Germain-des-Prés neighborhood and the nearby Saint-Michel neighborhood became home to many small jazz clubs, mostly located in cellars, due to the shortage of any suitable space, and because the music at late hours was less likely to disturb the neighbors. The first to open in 1945 was the Caveau des Lorientais, near Boulevard Saint-Michel, which introduced Parisians to New Orleans jazz, played by clarinetist Claude Luter and his band. It closed shortly afterwards, but was soon followed by other cellars; Le Vieux-Columbier, the Rose Rouge, the Club Saint-Germain; and Le Tabou. The musical styles were be-bop and jazz, led by Sidney Bechet and trumpet player Boris Vian; Mezz Mezzrow, André Rewellotty, and guitarist Henri Salvador. The clubs attracted students from the nearby university, the Paris intellectual community, and celebrities from the Paris cultural world. They soon had doormen who controlled who was important or famous enough to be allowed inside into the cramped, smoke-filled cellars. A few of the musicians went on to celebrated careers; Sidney Bechet was the star of the first jazz festival held at the Salle Pleyel in 1949, and headlined at the Olympia music hall in 1955. The musicians were soon divided between those who played traditional New Orleans jazz, and those who wanted more modern varieties. Most of the clubs closed by the early 1960s, as musical tastes shifted toward rock and roll.

=== Cabarets and Music Halls ===
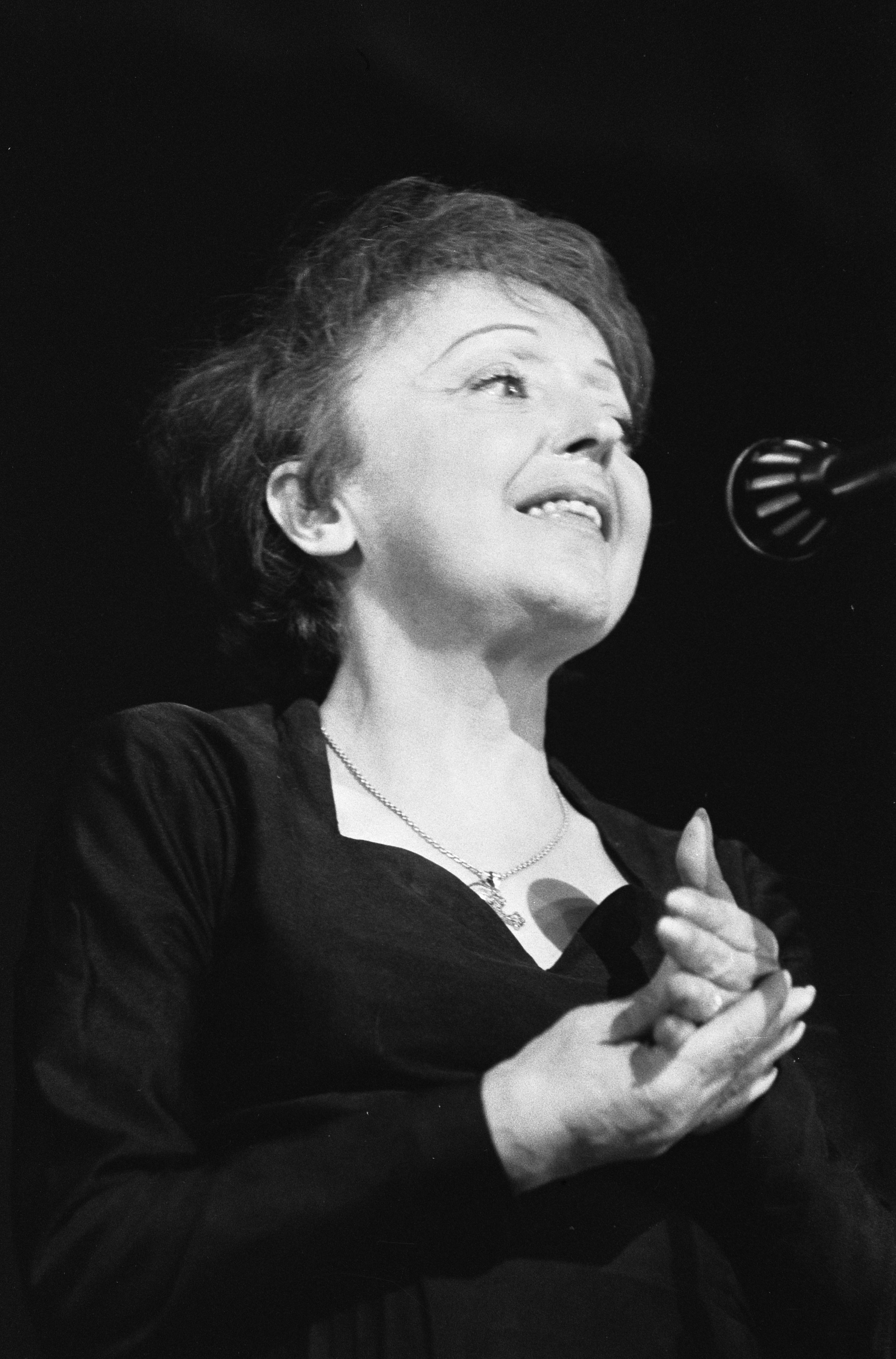
Édith Piaf in 1962

Between 1945 and 1960 the cabarets and music halls played an important part in Paris culture, giving a stage to established stars and new talent. The most important music halls of the period were the Olympia Paris and Bobino, while the important cabarets included La Galerie 55, L'Echelle de Jacob, le Port de Salut, l'Ecluse and Trois Baudets. Future French stars who debuted in the cabarets after the war included Bourvil in 1946, Yves Montand in 1947, Juliette Gréco in 1948, Georges Brassens at the Trois Baudets in 1952, and Jacques Brel at the same club in 1953. Headliners at the Olympia included Édith Piaf in 1949, Gilbert Bécaud in 1954, and Charles Aznavour, Tino Rossi and Dalida in 1955. The year 1958 saw the Paris debut of rock singer Johnny Hallyday, followed in 1959 by Eddy Mitchell. Paris singing stars in the 1980s and 1990s included Serge Lama, Serge Gainsbourg, Michel Berger, Yves Duteil, Francis Cabrel, Patrick Bruel, and Jean-Jacques Goldman.

=== Classical music ===
The most influential figure classical music in postwar Paris was Olivier Messiaen (1908-1992), organist at the Trinity Church beginning in 1930 and professor at the Paris Conservatory of Music from 1942. He was noted for his scientific study of bird songs (1958), his adaptions of traditional Asian and Latin American rhythms (1960); and original church music. Other notable composers included Pierre Schaeffer, founder of the school called music concréte and composer of Symphonie pour un home seul (1950) and Orphée 51 (1951); the composer Pierre Henry, a collaborator of Schaeffer, pioneer of electro-acoustic music; and composer of The Well-Tempered microphone; and the conductor and composer Pierre Boulez, a pioneer of serial music.

=== Literature and existentialism ===
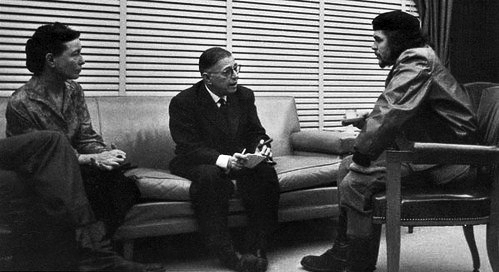
Simone de Beauvoir and Jean-Paul Sartre meet with Che Guevara (1960)

The literary life of Paris after World War II was also centered in Saint-Germain-des-Prés on the left bank, where there was a large concentration of book stores and publishing houses. Because most writers lived in tiny rooms or apartments, they gathered in cafés, most famously the Café de Flore, the Brasserie Lipp and Les Deux Magots, where the philosopher Jean-Paul Sartre and writer Simone de Beauvoir held court. Sartre (1905-1980) was the most prominent figure of the period; he was a philosopher, the founder of the school of existentialism, but also a novelist, playwright, and theater director. He also was very involved in the Paris politics of the left; after the war he was a follower (though not a member) of the Communist Party, then broke with the communists after the Soviet invasion of Hungary, and became an admirer of Fidel Castro and the Cuban Revolution, then of Mao-tse Tung. In 1968 he joined the demonstrations against the government, standing on a barrel to address striking workers at the Renault factory in Billancourt. The legends of Saint-Germain-des-Prés describe him a frequenting the jazz clubs of the neighborhood, but Sartre wrote that he rarely visited them, finding them too crowded, uncomfortable and loud. Simone de Beauvoir (1908–1986), the lifelong companion of Sartre, was another important literary figure, both as an early proponent of feminism and as an autobiographer and novelist.

Other major literary figures in Paris during the period included Albert Camus (1913–1960), like Sartre a writer and novelist of the left but a vocal critic of Stalinism; André Maurois, François Mauriac, André Malraux and Marcel Pagnol. A new literary movement emerged in Paris in the 1950s, known as the Nouveau Roman, "the new novel", the "anti-novel", or "anti-romanticism." Important new writers who emerged in Paris in the 1950s and 1960s included Alain Robbe-Grillet, Marguerite Duras, Nathalie Sarraute, Claude Mauriac, Michel Butor, Claude Simon, Henri Troyat, Maurice Druon, Marguerite Yourcenar, and Michel Tournier. Paris was also home for many notable international writers, including the African-American writers James Baldwin and Richard Wright, who found the city more welcoming than the U.S. in the early 1950s.

=== Theater ===
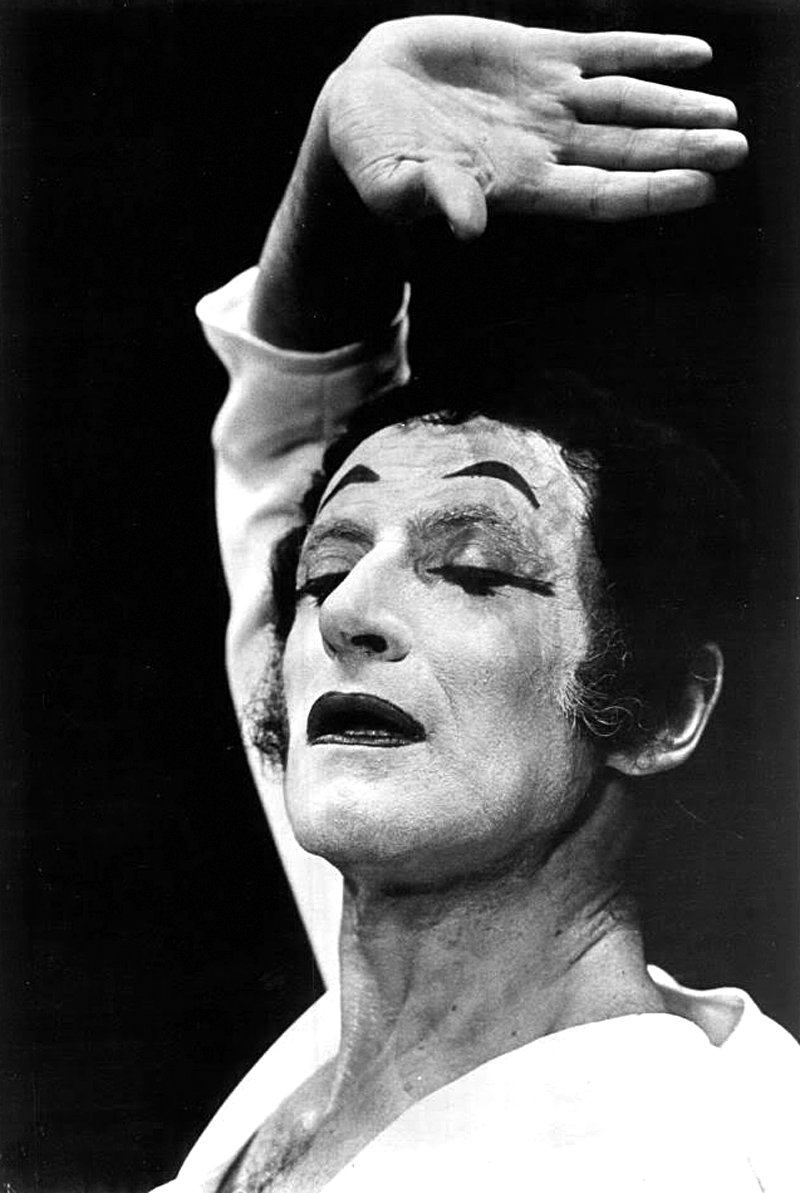
Beginning in 1947 Marcel Marceau re-invented pantomime at left-bank night clubs

The theater world of Paris adapted successfully to the competition from motion pictures and then from television. The Comédie-Française, the oldest theater in the city, continued to be the cathedral of French classical drama, though its actors also frequently appeared in French films. The number of theaters in the city actually increased over the course of the century from forty-three in 1905 to 118 in 1990, though a large part of the new theaters were very small. A generation of new playwrights and directors radically changed the content and style of Paris theater; prominent directors included Jean Vilar, who headed the Thèâtre national popular from 1951 to 1963, and put on successful new productions of works by T. S. Eliot. Pirandello and Molière; the actor-director Jean-Louis Barrault and his wife, Madeleine Renaud, who created the Compagnie Renaud-Barrault in 1947 and the Théâtre d'Orsay in 1974, produced French classics as well as innovative new works. The leading playwrights of the period were Eugène Ionesco, born in Romania, who revolutionized Paris theater with his 1950 play The Bald Soprano (1950); Samuel Beckett, born in Ireland, who combined irony and burlesque in Waiting for Godot (1953); and Jean Genet, who had spent time in prison, who wrote provocative plays about sex, crime and prejudice. Other popular Paris playwrights included Jean Anouilh and Armand Salacrou. Marcel Marceau achieved worldwide fame by reinventing the art of pantomime beginning at clubs in the Latin Quarter in 1947, then in major theaters; he founded a school of mime in Paris in 1958.

=== Painting and sculpture ===
Following World War II, Paris lost its position as the most important art market in the world, passed by New York, and soon was challenged by London, Berlin, Tokyo and other cities. The Paris art auction house Hôtel Drouot, founded under Napoleon and dominant before the war, slipped behind its London rivals, Sotheby's and Christie's. The most prominent artist in Paris, Pablo Picasso, departed for the south of France, where Henri Matisse had already moved. The cost of apartments and scarcity of ateliers made it harder for young artists to establish colonies in the city, as they had previously done in Montmartre and Montparnasse.

Notable painters and sculptors in Paris included Jean Dubuffet; Victor Vasarely, a pioneer of Op Art; the sculptor Niki de Saint Phalle, famous for her colorful sculptural figures; Arman and César Baldaccini.

In 1964, French cultural minister André Malraux invited Marc Chagall, who had fled Paris to escape the Nazis in 1941, to paint the ceiling of the Opéra Garnier.

In August–September, 1985, after years of negotiation with the French government, the conceptual artists Christo and Jeanne-Claude wrapped the Pont Neuf with 40,000 square meters of polyamide plastic. The bridge remained wrapped for two weeks.

The first dedicated museum of modern art in Paris, the Musée d'art moderne de la ville de Paris opened in June, 1947 in the old Palais de Tokyo of the 1937 Universal Exposition. The Centre Georges Pompidou, a project launched by President Georges Pompidou and dedicated to 20th century art, opened in 1977.
