= No Man's Land (disambiguation) =

No man's land is an unoccupied area between two opposing militaries’ positions.

No Man's Land and variants may also refer to:

== Places ==
=== Unclaimed places ===
- No one's land (Terra nullius), land claimed by no country

=== Disputed places ===
- No man's land (Latrun) in Palestine/Israel

=== United Kingdom ===
- No Man's Land, Cornwall, England
- No Man's Land Fort, off the coast of the Isle of Wight, England
- Nomansland, Devon, England
- Nomansland, Hertfordshire, England
- Nomansland, Wiltshire, England

=== United States ===
- No Man's Land, Illinois
- No Man's Land (Louisiana) or Neutral Ground
- No Man's Land (Oklahoma) or Oklahoma Panhandle
- Nomans Land (Massachusetts)
  - No Man's Land Navy Airfield
  - Nomans Land Range
  - Nomans Land Island National Wildlife Refuge

== Film ==
- No Man's Land (1918 film), an American silent drama film by Will S. Davis
- No Man's Land (1931 film) or Hell on Earth, a German film
- No Man's Land (1939 film), an Italian drama film
- No Man's Land (1962 film), a film starring Roger Moore
- No Man's Land (1964 film), an American war drama film
- No Man's Land (1984 film), an American television film by Rod Holcomb
- No Man's Land (1985 film), a French-language film by Alain Tanner
- No Man's Land (1987 film), an American film by Peter Werner
- No Man's Land (2001 film), a Bosnian-language film by Danis Tanović
- No Man's Land: The Rise of Reeker, a 2008 American film by Dave Payne
- No Man's Land (2013 film), a Chinese film by Ning Hao
- No Man's Land (2021 American film), an American film starring Andie MacDowell
- No Man's Land (2021 Malayalam film), an Indian Malayalam independent thriller film

== Literature ==
- No Man's Land (play), a play by Harold Pinter
- No Man's Land (Baldacci novel), a novel by David Baldacci
- No Man's Land (Greene novel), a 1950 novel by Graham Greene
- No Man's Land: An Investigative Journey Through Kenya and Tanzania, a 1994 book by George Monbiot
- Batman: No Man's Land, a 1999–2000 Batman comic book crossover storyline
- No Man's Land, a 1917 short-story collection by H. C. McNeile
- No Man's Land, a short-story collection by Anuradha Sharma Pujari
- Nomansland, a 1993 novel by David G. Compton
- No Man's Land, a hip-hop theater play by Marc Bamuthi Joseph
- No Man's Land, a novel by Simon Tolkien

== Television ==
- "No Man's Land" (CSI: Miami)
- "No Man's Land" (Gotham)
- "No Man's Land" (Grey's Anatomy)
- "No Man's Land" (Stargate Atlantis)
- No Man's Land (audio drama), a 2006 audio drama based on Doctor Who

== Music ==
- No Man's Land (record label), a German record label based in Würzburg, Germany

=== Albums ===
- No Man's Land (Jacques Higelin album) (1978)
- No Man's Land (Lene Lovich album) (1982)
- No Man's Land (Souls of Mischief album) (1995)
- No Man's Land (Frank Turner album) (2019)
- No Man's Land, a 1985 album by Terry Riley
- Nomansland, a 2011 album by Milk Inc.

=== Songs ===
- "No Man's Land" (Eric Bogle song) (1976)
- "No Man's Land" (Billy Joel song) (1993)
- "No Man's Land" (Beverley Knight song) (2007)
- "No Man's Land" (Koda Kumi song) (2012)
- "No Man's Land" (John Michael Montgomery song) (1995)
- "No Man's Land" (Midnight Oil song) (2003)
- "No Man's Land", by Stela Cole from "Woman of the Hour"
- "No Man's Land", by Bella Poarch featuring Grimes from "Dolls EP"
- "No Man's Land", by Syd Barrett from The Madcap Laughs
- "No Man's Land", by Alice Cooper from DaDa
- "No Man's Land", by Download from Furnace
- "No Man's land", by Marshmello and Venbee 2024
- "No Mans Land", by Mike Oldfield from Tres Lunas
- "No Man's Land", by OMD from English Electric
- "No Man's Land", by Panda Bear from Crosswords
- "No Man's Land", an alternative title for "I Will" by Radiohead from Hail to the Thief
- "No Man's Land", by Bob Seger from Against the Wind
- "No Man's Land", by Soul Asylum from While You Were Out
- "No Man's Land", by Sufjan Stevens from The Avalanche
- "No Man's Land", an instrumental composition by Tangerine Dream from Hyperborea
- "No Man's Land", by AC/DC from their 2020 album Power Up
- "No Man's Land", by Ted Nugent, from Penetrator, 1984

== Sport ==
- No man's land, a strategically vulnerable area on a pickleball court
- No-man's land, a strategically vulnerable area on a tennis court

== Other uses ==
- No Man's Land, a sculpture by Charles Sargeant Jagger
- No Man's Land (video game), a 2003 video game
- No Man's Land (Call of Cthulhu), a 1998 adventure for the role-playing game Call of Cthulhu

== See also ==
- Dead zone (gridiron football), also called no man's land
- Niemandsland and Beyond, a 1990 album by Koos Kombuis
- Tierra de Nadie (disambiguation), (Spanish for "No Mans Land")
- No Land's Man, a 2021 film by Mostofa Sarwar Farooki, starring Nawazuddin Siddiqui
- No Land's Man (book), by Aasif Mandvi
