= NML =

NML may refer to:

- Fort McMurray/Mildred Lake Airport (IATA code: NML), an airport in Canada
- Neue Marx-Lektüre, "New Marx Reading", a contemporary form of Marxism and critique of political economy.
- National Medical Library, an Indian medical library established in 1966
- National Metallurgical Laboratory, an Indian research center
- National Microbiology Laboratory, a Canadian research institute
- National Museum of Language, an American literary museum
- National Museums Liverpool, a British charity
- National Music League, an American arts organization
- New.Music.Live., a MuchMusic television series
- New Melones Lake, an American artificial lake
- NML Capital Limited, a hedge fund owned by Paul Singer (businessman)
- No More Landmines, a British mine clearance organization
- Norm Macdonald Live, a Canadian podcast
- Northwestern Mutual Life Insurance Company, an American financial services mutual organization based in Milwaukee
- Not My Life, a 2011 American documentary film
- Nowe Miasto Lubawskie, Poland

== See also ==
- No Man's Land (disambiguation)
- nml, ISO 639 code for the Ndemli language of Cameroon
