= Natural World Book Prize =

- Description: Recognizing excellence in environmental literature
- Country: United Kingdom
- Presented by: The Wildlife Trusts
- Status: Discontinued

The Natural World Book Prize was an award organised by The Wildlife Trusts, and presented to recognise environmental literature. Considered the premier environmental book prize in the UK, it was sometimes referred to as the 'green Booker'. It was formerly known as the BP Natural World Book Prize (after its sponsor, BP), and in origin it was a merging of two previous awards, BP's Sir Peter Kent Book Prize, and a competition run by The Natural World, the magazine of the Wildlife Trusts.

== Winners ==
- 1987 - Chris Baines - The Wild Side of Town
- 1988 - Jeremy Purseglove - Taming of the Flood
- 1989 - Philip Wayre - Operation Otter
- 1990 - Jonathan Kingdon - Island Africa: The Evolution of Africa's Rare Animals and Plants
- 1991 - George Monbiot - Amazon Watershed
- 1992 - Iain Douglas Hamilton, Oria Douglas Hamilton - Battle for the Elephants
- 1993 - Edward O. Wilson - The Diversity of Life
- 1994 - Oliver Rackham - The Illustrated History of the Countryside
- 1995 - Colin Tudge - The Day Before Yesterday
- 1996 - David Quammen - The Song of the Dodo
- 1997 - Graham Harvey - The Killing of the Countryside
- 1998 - David Attenborough - The Life of Birds
- 1999 - Steve Jones - Almost Like a Whale
- 2000 - Brian Clarke - The Stream
- 2001 - No Award
- 2002 - Edward O. Wilson - The Future of Life

== See also ==
- List of environmental awards

== Sources ==
- List of winners, from The Booklist Center, accessed 14 May 2009
- Six line up for lesser-spotted Booker prize, Michael McCarthy, The Independent, 30 November 1998
- BP Natural World Book Prize, design of one of the logos, accessed 14 May 2009
