= Amazon Watershed =

1991 book by George Monbiot

- Cover of the first edition
- Author: George Monbiot
- Language: English
- Subjects: Deforestation, The Amazon, Logging
- Published: London
- Publisher: Michael Joseph, Abacus (1992)
- Publication date: 1991
- Publication place: United Kingdom
- Media type: Print (paperback)
- Pages: 374
- ISBN: 0349101620
- Preceded by: Poisoned Arrows
- Followed by: No Man's Land: An Investigative Journey Through Kenya and Tanzania

Amazon Watershed : the new environmental investigation is a 1991 book by British writer and environmental and political activist George Monbiot.

== Synopsis ==
The book is an investigation into the expulsion of peasants from their homes and their forced relocation to the Amazon. Military police attempt to kill Monbiot as he exposes a vast military project opening up the area to logging and deforestation. He tracks timber cut illegally from Indian reserves all the way back to retailers in the United Kingdom. According to the publishers, Monbiot also "examines the role of the British and American governments in promoting, wittingly or otherwise, this great ecological catastrophe".

== Reception ==
The book won the Natural World Book Prize, described as "the premier environmental book prize in the UK" in 1991.
