= Spillover (book) =

2012 nonfiction by David Quammen about the spillovers and zoonosis

Spillover: Animal Infections and the Next Human Pandemic
- First edition
- Author: David Quammen
- Language: English
- Subject: Epidemiology, viruses, pandemics
- Published: 2012
- Publisher: W.W. Norton & Company
- Publication place: United States
- Pages: 592 p
- ISBN: 978-0-393-06680-7
- Website: davidquammen.com/spillover

Spillover: Animal Infections and the Next Human Pandemic is 2012 non-fiction book by David Quammen. The book, written in narrative form, tells through the personal experiences of the author, who interviewed numerous pathologists and virologists globally to trace the evolution of some of the major pathogens that have affected the human species following a species leap (spillover), a natural process by which an animal pathogen evolves and becomes able to infect, reproduce and transmit within the human species, in a process called zoonosis. Spillover received positive reviews.

== Synopsis ==
In the various chapters of the book, the author dwells on the analysis of a specific pathogen, starting from its discovery and studies on it: the Hendra virus in the first chapter; the Ebola virus in the second; the mathematical study of epidemics at the same time as the spread of malaria in the third; SARS in the fourth; bacterial zoonosis in the fifth chapter (Q fever, psittacosis and Lyme disease); the study of viral transmissibility from animal to man with the case study of herpes B in monkeys and hepadnaviruses from bats in the sixth and seventh chapters; HIV in the eighth chapter and finally some considerations on the evolution of epidemics in relation to the contribution that human activities have in the spread of zoonosis.

Among the human activities, the author identifies some criticisms that increasingly favor the spread of epidemics, including deforestation and the destruction of natural habitats that increase contacts between wild animal species and man, pollution, the overpopulation of some areas that brings millions of people into contact in relatively very confined spaces, the possibility of ever faster and cheaper air travel that favor the possibility of spreading diseases in distant places, and the intensive in contact with billions of animals with the consequent risk of animal epidemics that can be transmitted to humans. All these factors, therefore, in different ways favor the spread of diseases and increase the chances of new future spillovers with pathogens still unknown to the human species but present in nature, just waiting for the right "opportunity" to "make the leap" in humans.

“Spillover” is less public health warning than ecological affirmation: these crossovers force us to uphold “the old Darwinian truth (the darkest of his truths, well known and persistently forgotten) that humanity is a kind of animal” — with a shared fate on the planet. “People and gorillas, horses and duikers and pigs, monkeys and chimps and bats and viruses,” Quammen writes. “We’re all in this together.”

— Breeding Ground, Sonia Shah's review of the book for The New York Times

== Viruses and pathogens discussed in the book ==
- Chapter 1: Hendra virus
- Chapter 2: Ebola virus
- Chapter 3: Malaria
- Chapter 4: SARS
- Chapter 5: Bacterial zoonosis - Q fever, psittacosis, and Lyme disease
- Chapter 6: Herpes B
- Chapter 7: Nipah virus, Marburg virus disease
- Chapter 8: HIV
- Chapter 9: Nuclear Polyhedrosis Virus
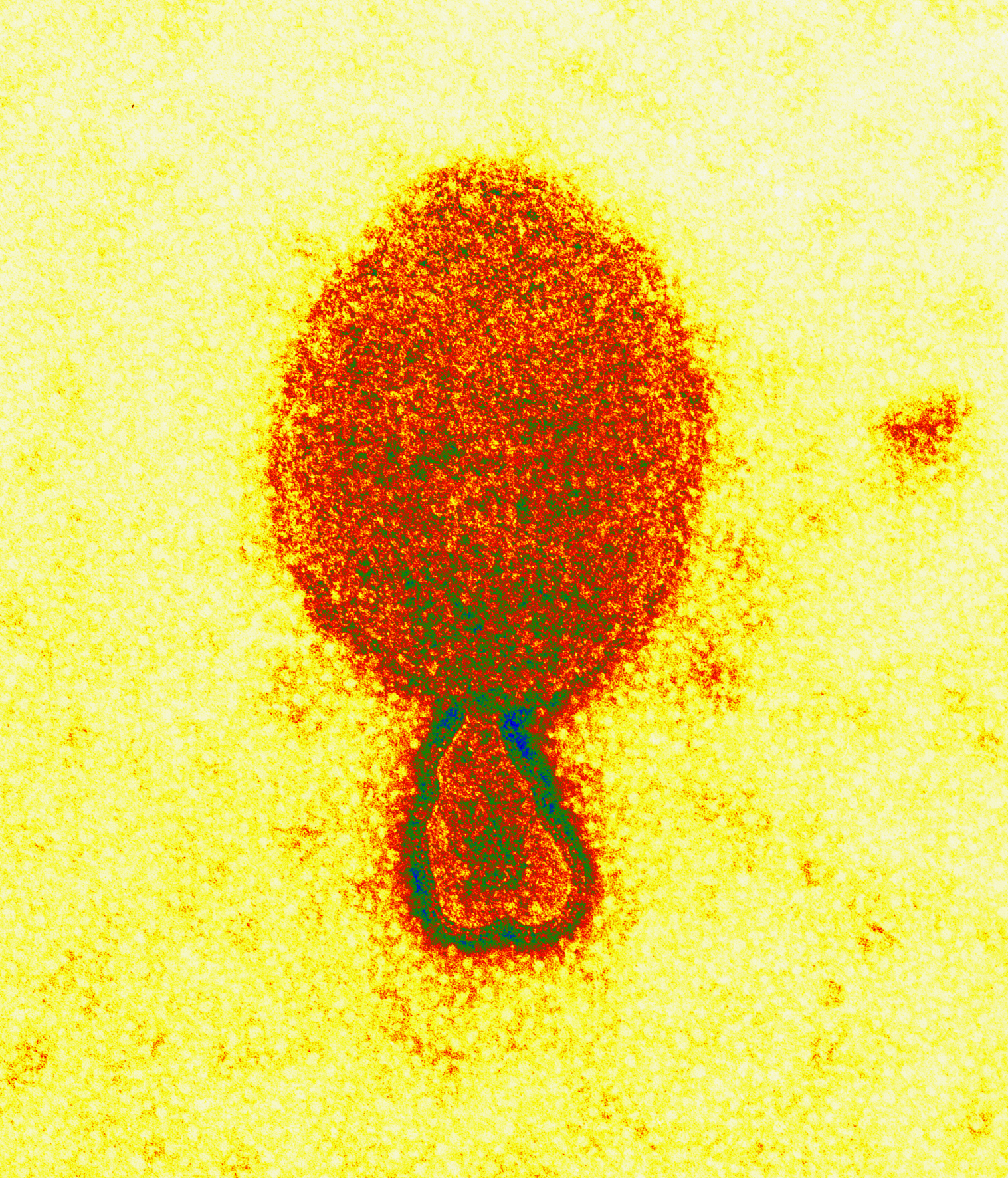
Hendra virus

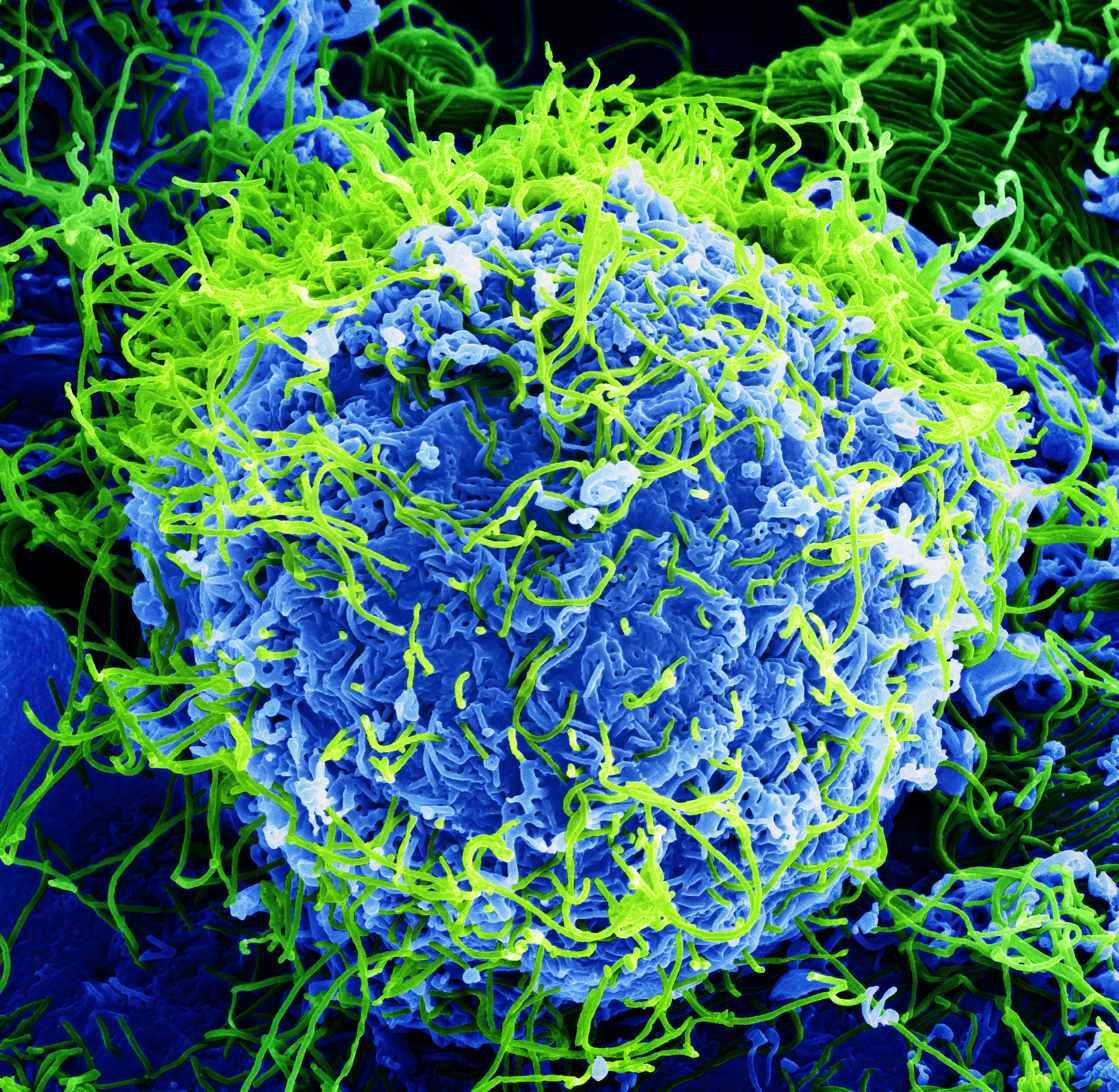
Ebola virus

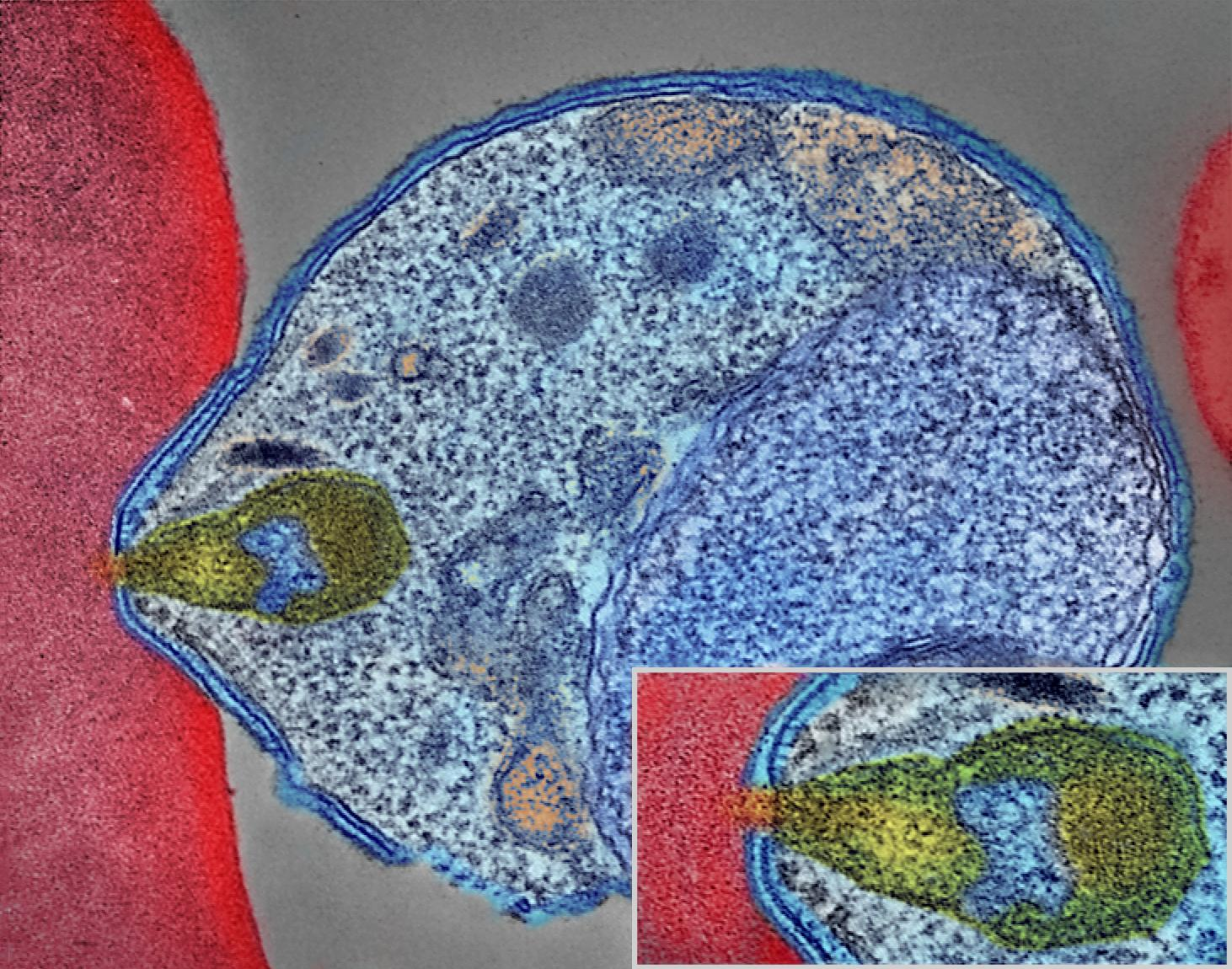
Malaria parasite connecting to a red blood cell

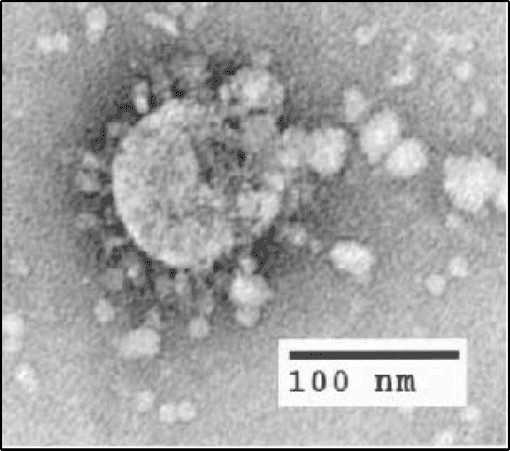
Electron micrograph of SARS coronavirus virion

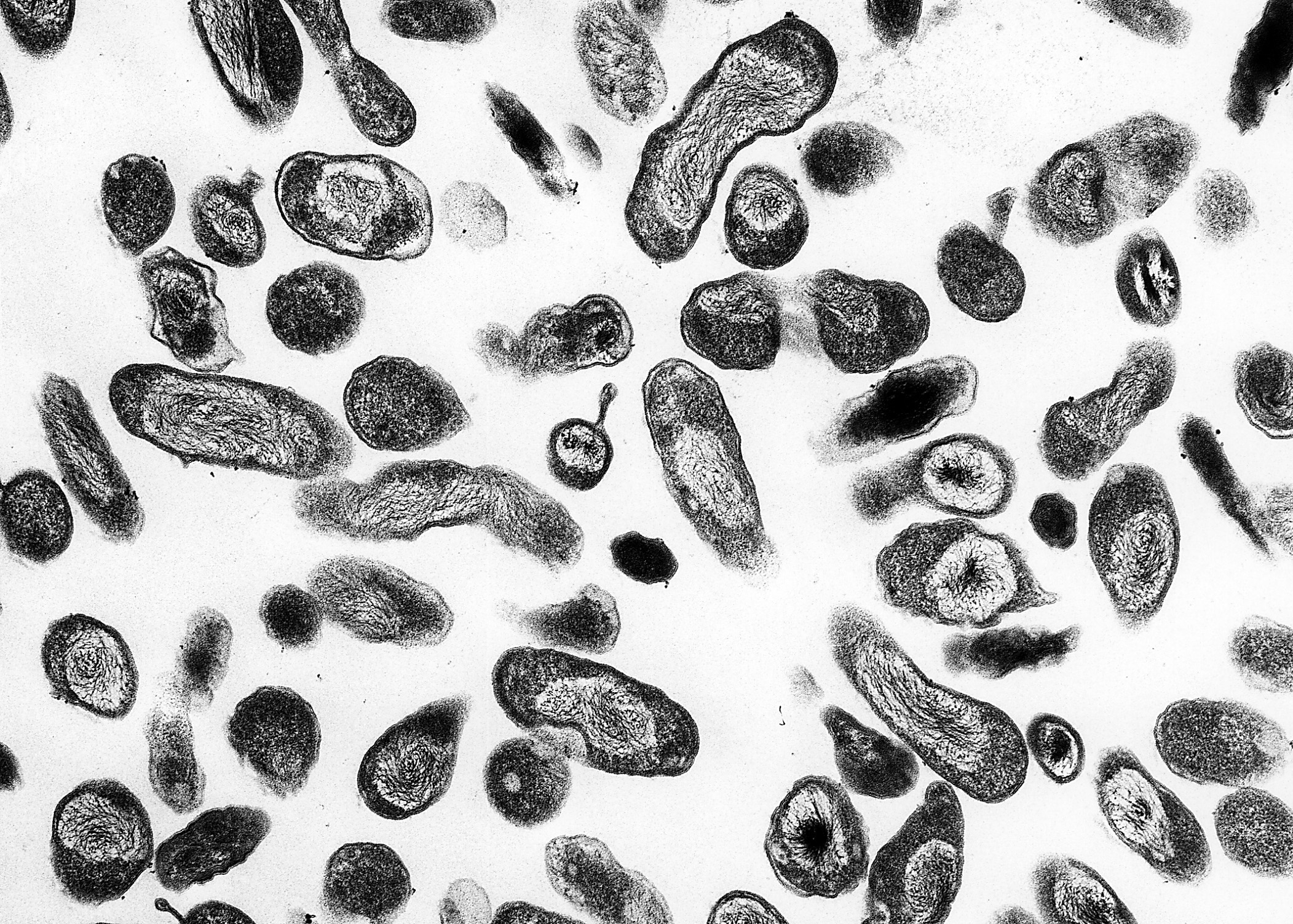
C. burnetii, the Q fever-causing agent

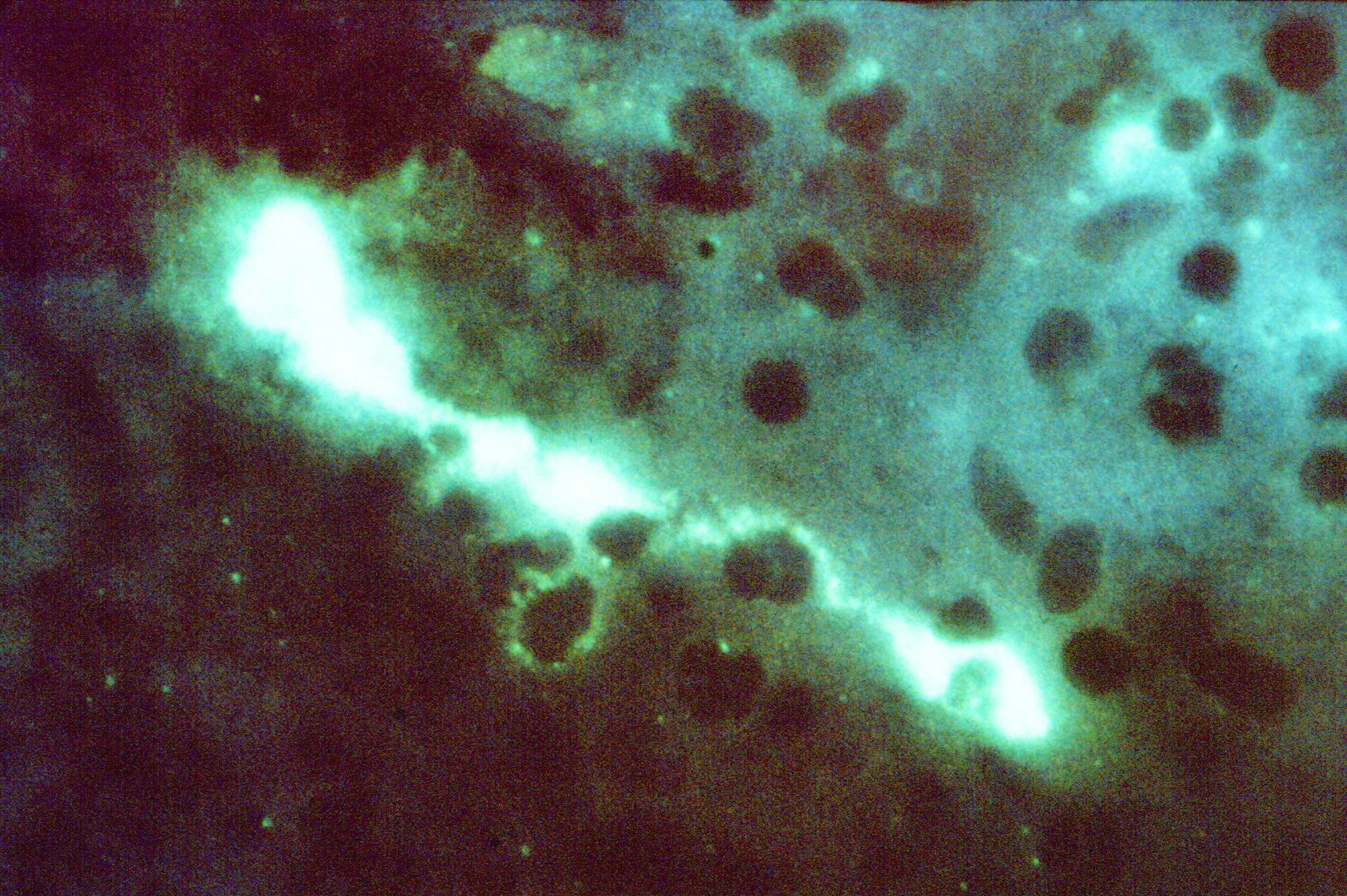
Direct fluorescent antibody stain of a mouse brain impression smear showing C. psittaci

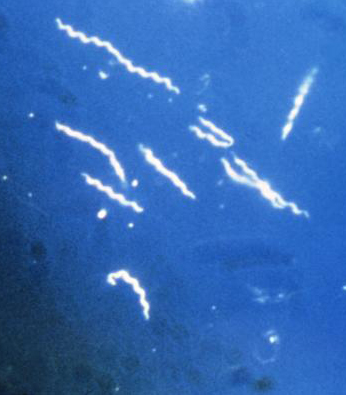
Borrelia burgdorferi the causative agent of Lyme disease (borreliosis) magnified 400 times

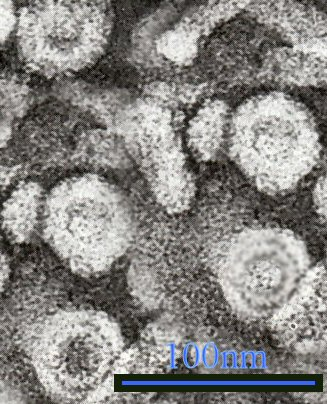
TEM micrograph showing Hepatitis B virus virions

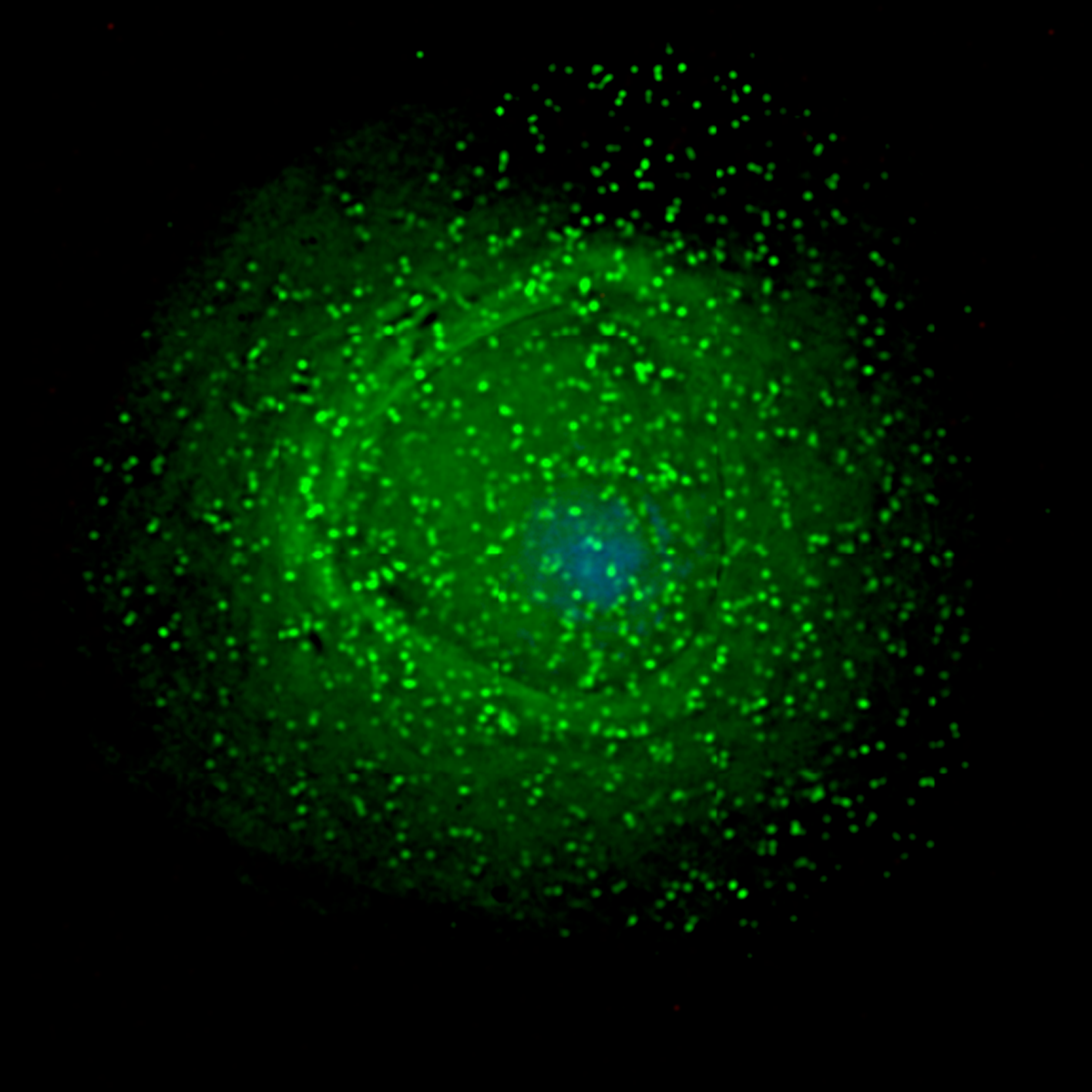
HIV assembling on the surface of an infected macrophage. The HIV virions have been marked with a green fluorescent tag

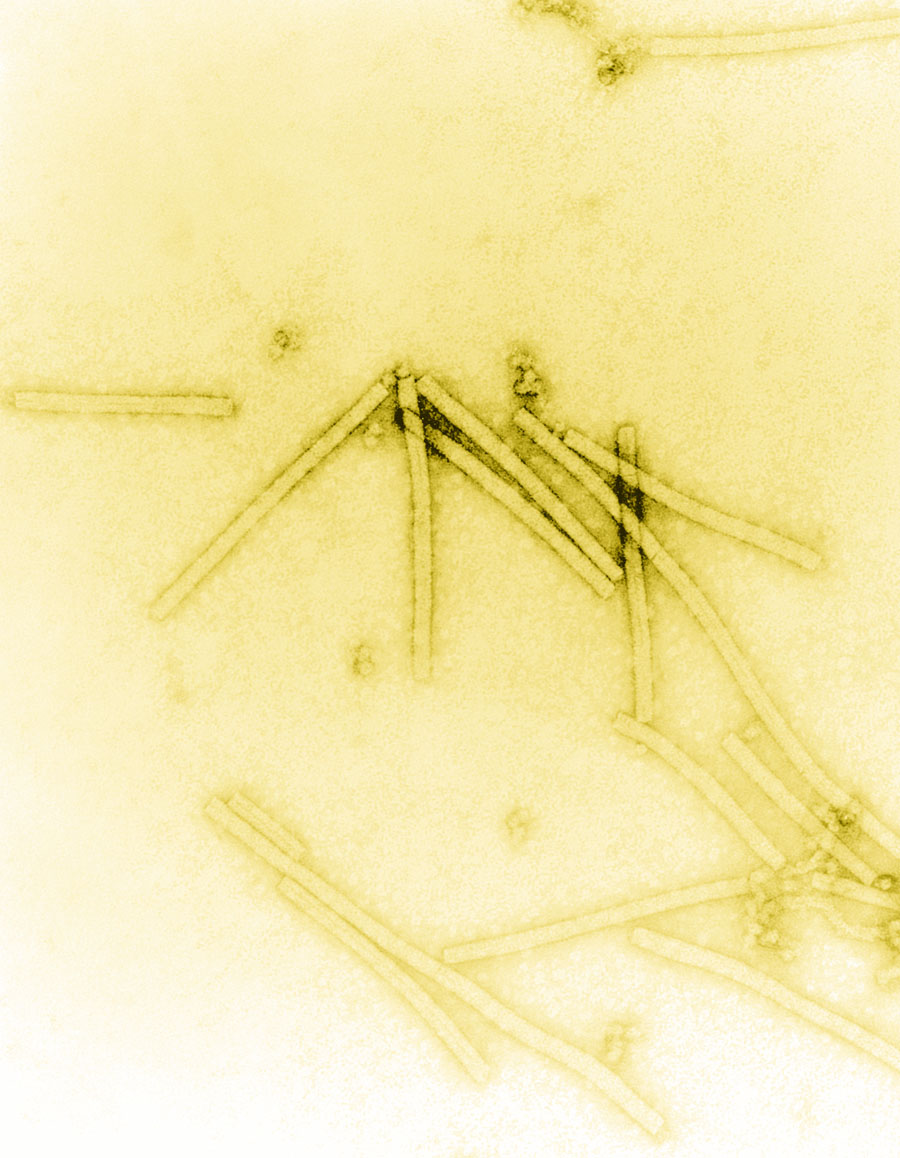
Electron micrograph of the rod-shaped particles of tobacco mosaic virus

== Reception ==
Spillover received positive reviews upon its release. Kirkus awarded a star review, praising the accounts on "the thrill of the chase and the derring-do of field research", and described it as "wonderful and eye-opening." Alice Roberts from The Guardian also recommended the book, and praised the recounts on the viruses, the "fascinating" historical details, and the combination of field research with virology, epidemiology and genetics Sonia Shah from The New York Times called it "meaty" and "sprawling", complimenting the descriptions of field trips, and considered the author to be a "cheeky and incisive chronicler of the scientific method". David Williams from Seattle Times also commented positively on the "page turning" engagement, the author highlighting the evolution of zoological diseases and coverage of epidemiologists researching the origins of diseases.

In 2020, Quammen was interviewed for the Bulletin of the Atomic Scientists, and was asked how it felt to predict a global pandemic. Quammen predicted that the coronavirus that causes COVID-19 will likely be around in some form for generations: “This virus is never going to be gone.”

== Awards ==
- The Science and Society Book Award, given by the National Association of Science Writers (2013)
- The Society of Biology (UK) Book Award in General Biology (2013)
- Andrew Carnegie Medals for Excellence in Fiction and Nonfiction (2013)
