= Poisoned Arrows =

1989 book by George Monbiot

Poisoned Arrows: An investigative journey through the forbidden lands of West Papua
- Cover of the first edition
- Author: George Monbiot
- Language: English
- Subject: West Papua
- Published: London
- Publisher: Michael Joseph, Green Books (2003)
- Publication date: 1989
- Publication place: United Kingdom
- Media type: Print
- Pages: 241
- ISBN: 1903998271
- Dewey Decimal: 919.510438
- Followed by: Amazon Watershed

Poisoned Arrows: An investigative journey through the forbidden lands of West Papua is a 1989 book by British writer and environmental and political activist George Monbiot. In the book, Monbiot discusses his travels to Western New Guinea amid the Papua conflict.

== Background ==
The book covers Monbiot's travels in the "forbidden forest territories of Irian Jaya" and his experiences with indigenous people, who Monbiot claims are being 'systematically exterminated' along with their wild forests.

== Reception ==
The book was widely praised in diverse sources. The Sunday Express described the book as "stunning...the strength of the book is that he resists the twin temptations of humourless campaigning and macho bragging" whilst the Sunday Telegraph noted "Monbiot is fascinating about the forest, the birds, the plants and, above all, the people. His descriptions of the various tribes and their beliefs are both erudite and affecting in their warmth". The book was also commended in the New Scientist and the Sunday Correspondent.
