= No man's land =

Strip of land between wartime trenches

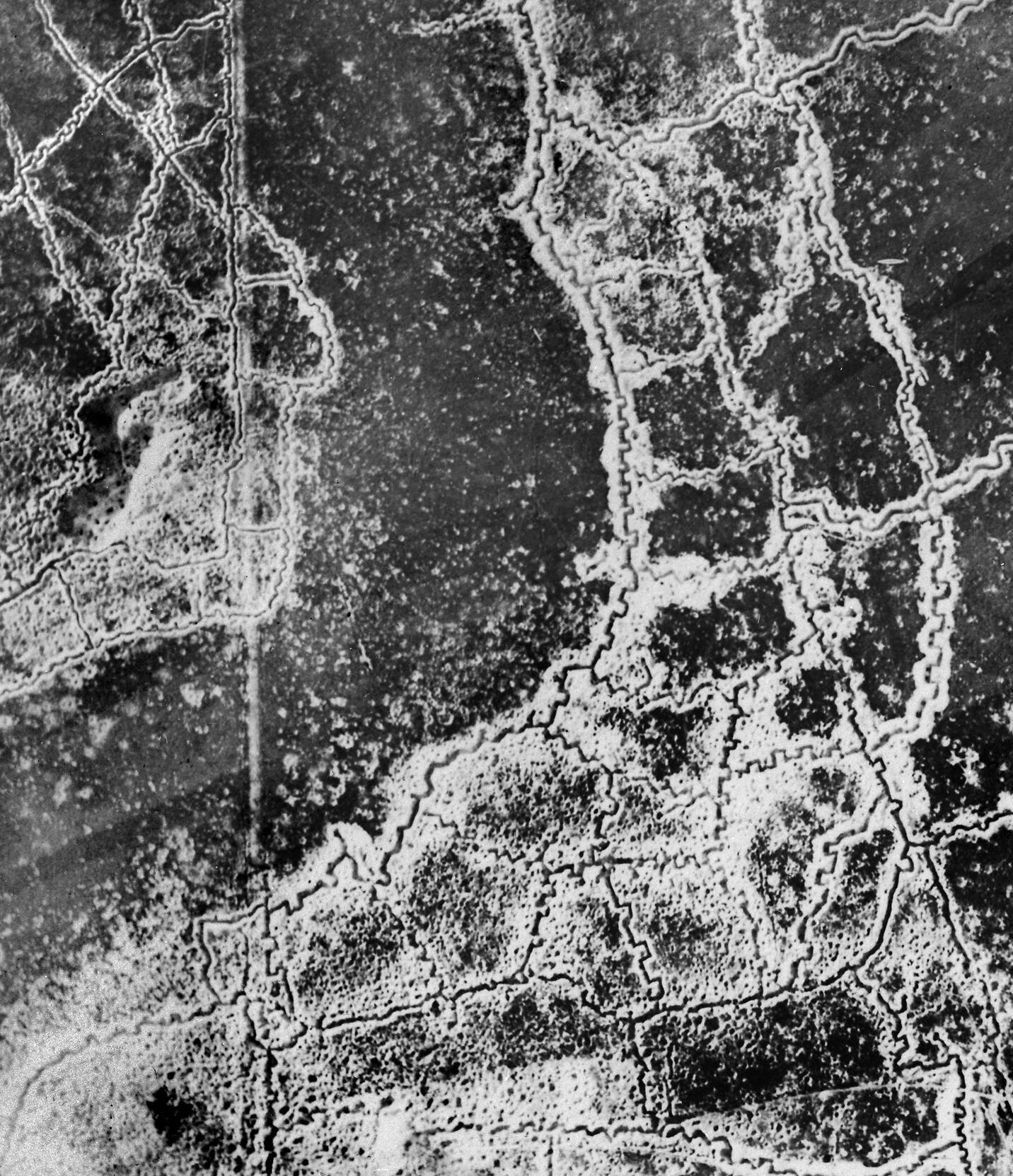
An aerial photograph showing opposing trenches and no man's land between Loos and Hulluch in France during World War I

No man's land is wasted, unowned land, an uninhabited or desolate area that may be under dispute between parties who leave it unoccupied out of fear or uncertainty. The term was originally used to define a contested territory or a dumping ground for refuse between fiefdoms. It is commonly associated with World War I to describe the area of land between two enemy trench systems, not controlled by either side. The term is also used metaphorically, to refer to an ambiguous, anomalous, or indefinite area, regarding an application, situation, or jurisdiction. It has sometimes been used to name a specific place.

== Origin ==
According to Alasdair Pinkerton, an expert in human geography at Royal Holloway, University of London, the term is first mentioned in Domesday Book (1086), to describe parcels of land that were just beyond London's city walls. The Oxford English Dictionary contains a reference to the term dating back to 1320, spelled nonesmanneslond, to describe a territory that was disputed or involved in a legal disagreement. The same term was later used as the name for the piece of land outside the north wall of London that was assigned as the place of execution. The term is also applied in nautical use to a space amidships, originally between the forecastle, the living quarters of ordinary sailors, and the masts in a square-rigged vessel where various ropes, tackle, block, and other supplies were stored. In the United Kingdom, several places called No Man's Land denoted "extra-parochial spaces that were beyond the rule of the church, beyond the rule of different fiefdoms that were handed out by the king … ribbons of land between these different regimes of power".

== Examples ==
=== World War I ===
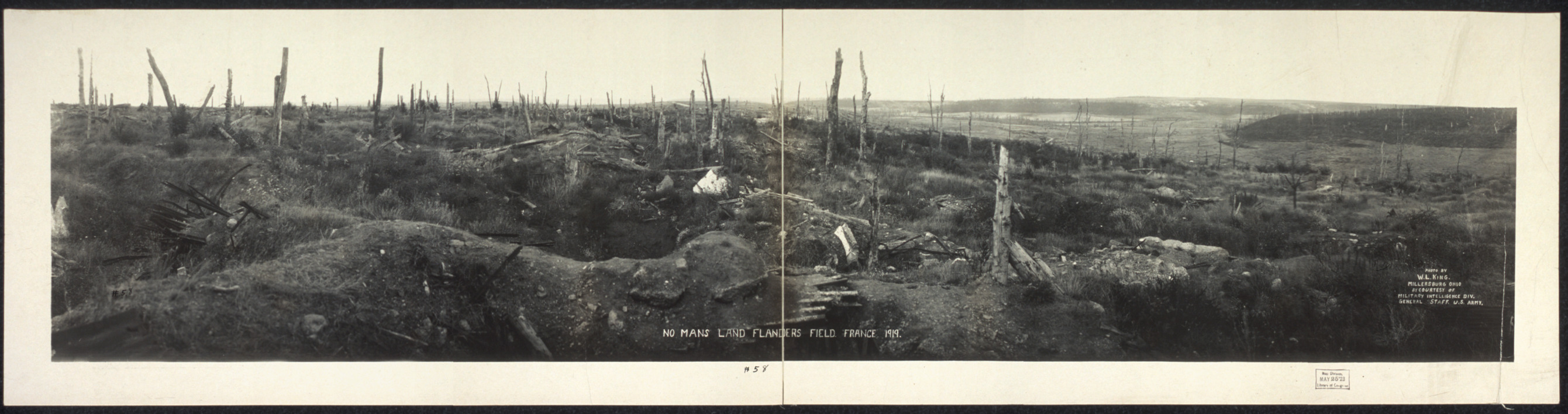
A stretch of no man's land at Flanders Fields, Belgium, 1919

Although the term no man's land had first been used in a military context in the 1908 short story "The Point of View" by soldier and historian Ernest Swinton, the British Army did not widely employ it when the Regular Army arrived in France in August 1914, soon after the outbreak of World War I. The terms used most frequently at the start of the war to describe the area between the trench lines included between the trenches and between the lines. Swinton used the term in war correspondence on the Western Front, with specific mention of the terms concerning the Race to the Sea in late 1914. The term came into common use in the context of the Anglo-German Christmas truce of 1914 and thereafter appeared frequently in official communiqués, newspaper reports, and personnel correspondences of the members of the British Expeditionary Force (BEF).

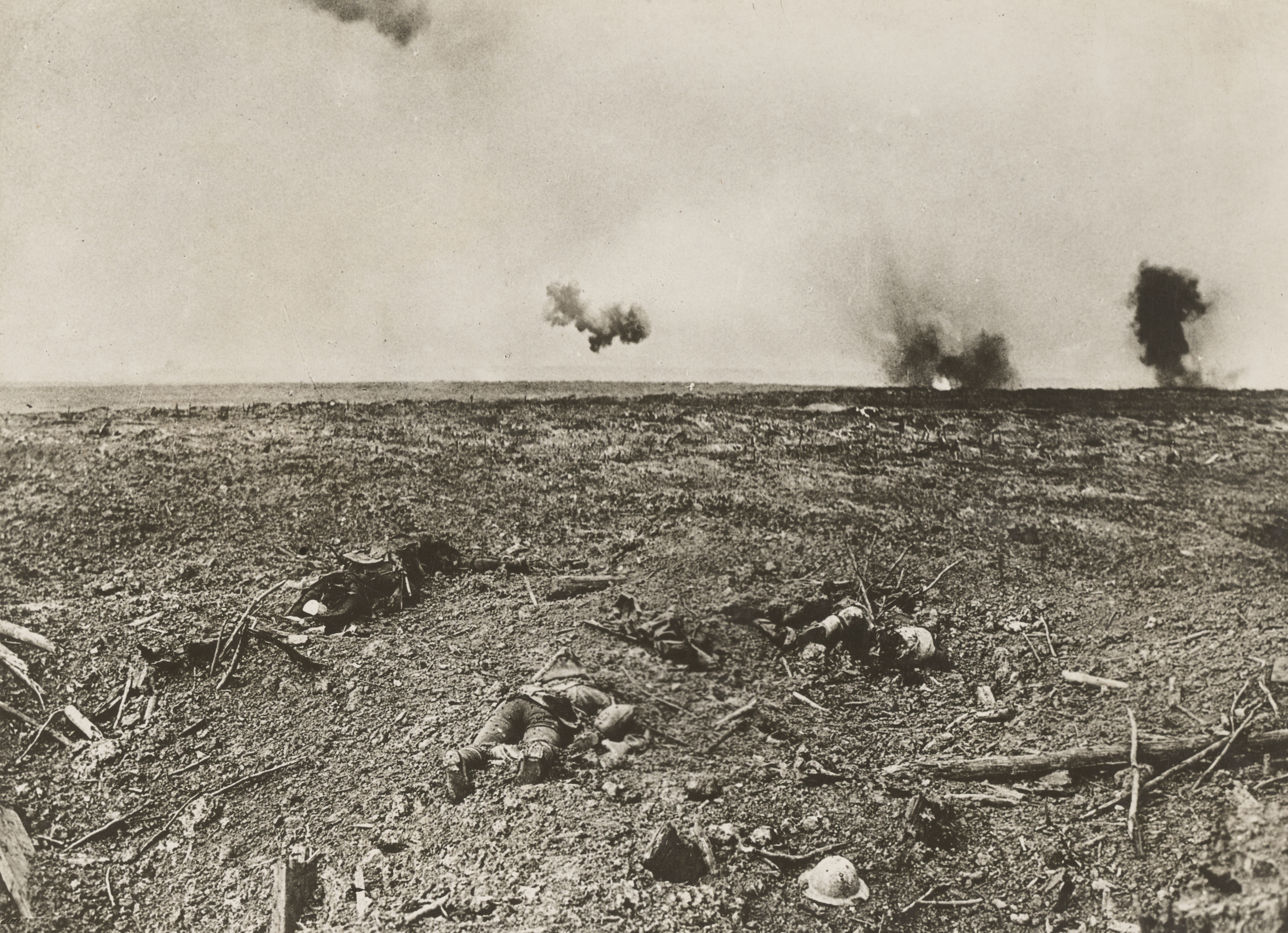
Dead Canadian soldiers lying in no man's land on the Somme battlefield in France, 1918

In World War I, no man's land often ranged from several hundred yards to less than 10 metres (33 ft), in some cases. Heavily defended by machine guns, mortars, artillery, and riflemen on both sides, it was often extensively cratered by exploded shells, riddled with barbed wire, and littered with rudimentary land mines; as well as the corpses and wounded soldiers who were unable to make it through the hailstorm of projectiles, explosions, and flames. The area was sometimes contaminated by chemical weapons. It was open to fire from the opposing trenches and hard going generally slowed any attempted advance.

Not only were soldiers forced to cross no man's land when advancing, and as the case might be when retreating, but after an attack the stretcher-bearers had to enter it to bring in the wounded. No man's land remained a regular feature of the battlefield until near the end of World War I when mechanised weapons (i.e., tanks and airplanes) made entrenched lines less of an obstacle.

The conditions of some World-War-I no man's lands persist today. At Verdun in France, for example, the zone rouge (red zone) contains unexploded ordnance and is poisoned beyond habitation by arsenic, chlorine, and phosgene gas. The zone is sealed off completely and still deemed too dangerous for civilians to return: "The area is still considered to be very poisoned, so the French government planted an enormous forest of black pines, like a living sarcophagus", comments Alasdair Pinkerton, a researcher at Royal Holloway University of London, who compared the zone to the nuclear disaster site at Chernobyl, similarly encased in a "concrete sarcophagus".

=== Cold War ===
During the Cold War, one example of "no man's land" was the territory close to the Iron Curtain. Officially the territory belonged to the Eastern Bloc countries, but over the entire Iron Curtain, there were several wide tracts of uninhabited land, several hundred meters (yards) in width, containing watch towers, minefields, unexploded bombs, and other such debris. Would-be escapees from Eastern Bloc countries who successfully scaled the border fortifications could still be apprehended or shot on sight by border guards in the zone. One notable incident was the killing of Peter Fechter, shot whilst attempting to cross the Berlin Wall into West Berlin.

The U.S. Naval Base at Guantánamo Bay, Cuba is separated from Cuba proper by an area called the Cactus Curtain. In late 1961, the Cuban Army had its troops plant a 13-kilometre (8.1 mi) barrier of Opuntia cactus along the northeastern section of the 28-kilometre (17 mi) fence surrounding the base to prevent economic migrants fleeing from Cuba from resettling in the United States. This was dubbed the "Cactus Curtain", an allusion to Europe's Iron Curtain and the Bamboo Curtain in East Asia. U.S. and Cuban troops placed some 55,000 land mines across the no man's land, creating the second-largest minefield in the world, and the largest in the Americas. On 16 May 1996, President Bill Clinton ordered the U.S. land mines to be removed and replaced with motion and sound sensors to detect intruders. The Cuban government has not removed the corresponding minefield on its side of the border.

=== Israel–Jordan ===
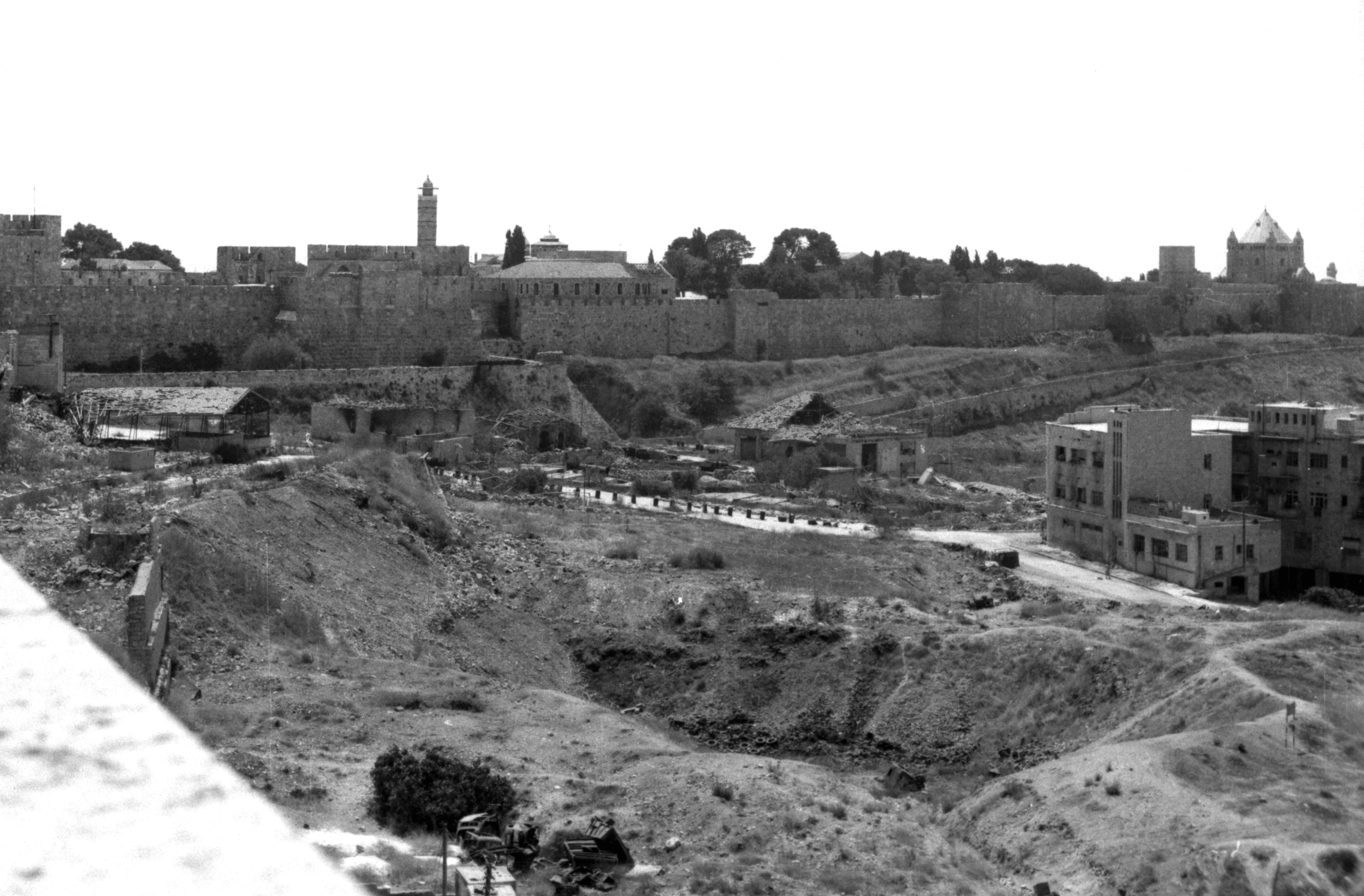
No man's land in Jerusalem, between Israel and Jordan, circa 1964

From 1949 to 1967 the border between Israel and Jordan contained a few small regions that were considered "no man's land" because neither side had jurisdiction. The 1949 Armistice Agreements between Israel and Jordan were signed in Rhodes with the help of UN mediation on 3 April 1949. Armistice lines were determined in November 1948. Between the lines territory was left that was defined as no man's land. Such areas existed in Jerusalem in the area between the western and southern parts of the Walls of Jerusalem and Musrara. A strip of land north and south of Latrun was also known as "no man's land" because it was not controlled by either Israel or Jordan between 1948 and 1967.

The no man's land regions were de facto eliminated when Israel conquered them during the Six-Day War.

=== Russo-Ukrainian War ===
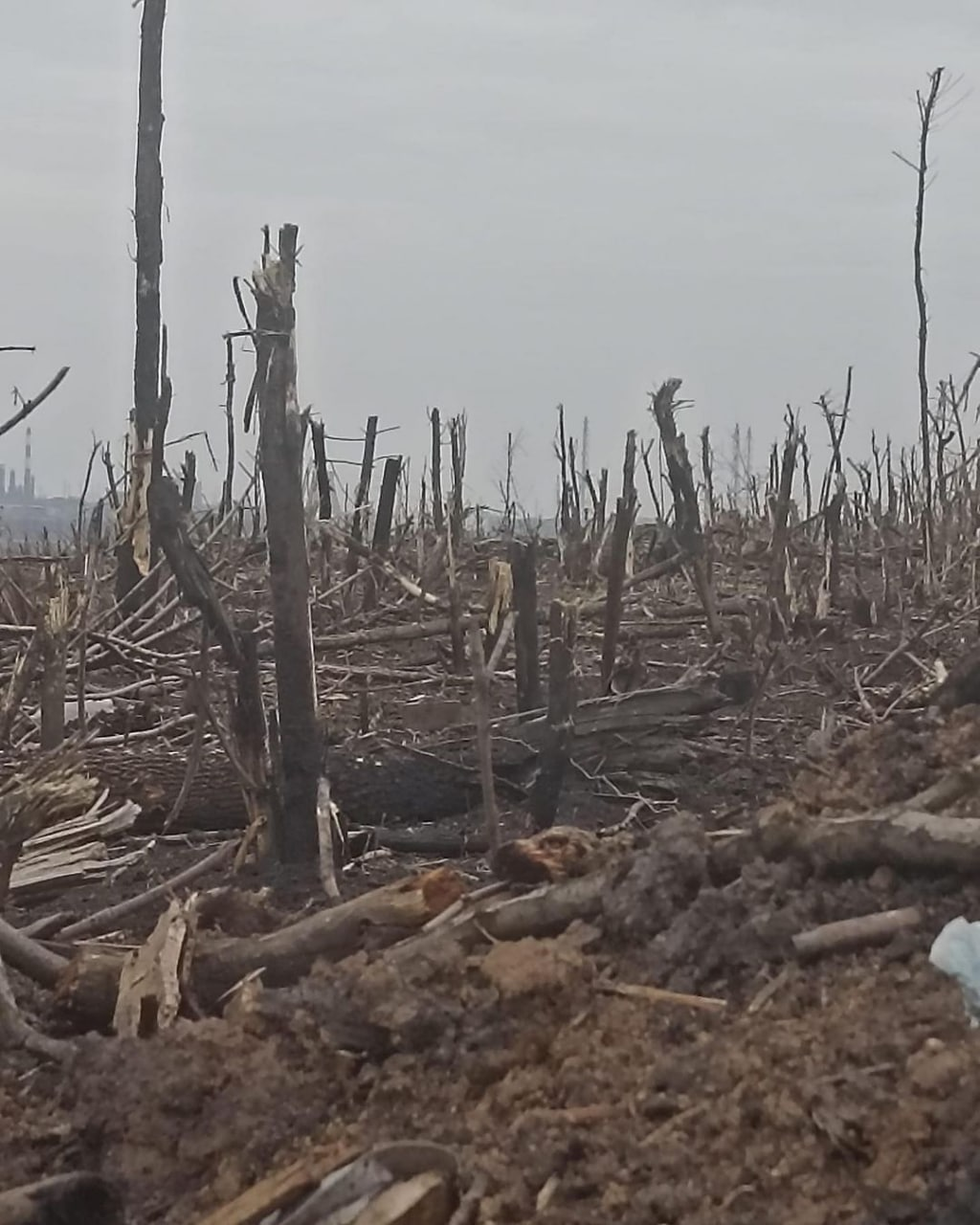
No man's land on the outskirts of Bakhmut

Trench warfare became common as the War in Donbas escalated in late 2014 and early 2015, as both Ukrainian and Russian separatists reinforced their positions with trench networks and deep bunkers in order to assert their territories. After the Minsk peace agreements, the conflict was frozen and lines didn't move, with a large no man's land forming between the Ukrainian and Russian proxy forces.

After the initial Russian Invasion of Ukraine in 2022 ended, the frontlines stabilized into trenchlines. With extremely high casualties, costly ground assaults with very little ground gained, and shell-pocked landscapes, volunteers, media, and government officials alike compared fighting to battlefield conditions on the western front of World War I. Retired U.S. Marine Corps Colonel Andrew Milburn, an eyewitness to the Battle of Bakhmut, compared conditions in the Bakhmut countryside to Passchendaele and the city itself to Dresden in World War II.

The No Man's Land area between Russian and Ukrainian lines was dubbed Gray Zone.

The further proliferation of drone warfare by 2023 and 2024 dramatically altered the nature of the Ukrainian no man's land. Constant surveillance from cheap, widely deployed reconnaissance and attack drones made movement across open ground extremely hazardous, turning the Gray Zone into what observers described as a "kill zone." Drones allow both sides to detect, track, and strike enemy troops far beyond the line of sight, erasing many of the protective qualities trenches once provided. Soldiers are often unable to move more than a few meters without risking detection, forcing units to rely heavily on camouflage, underground shelters, and rapid movement between covered positions. As a result, no man's land in Ukraine evolved from a static buffer of craters and debris into a hyper-lethal, drone-dominated space where exposure for even a few seconds could be fatal.

== Current no man's land ==
- The Agreement on Disengagement signed by Israel and Syria after the Yom Kippur War in 1974 established a United Nations Disengagement Observer Force-patrolled buffer zone in the Golan Heights, including Quneitra.
- United Nations Buffer Zone in Cyprus (The Green Line) and abandoned Varosha has acted as a no man's land between Cyprus and Northern Cyprus since 1974.

== See also ==
- Bir Tawil
- Demilitarized zone
- Exclusion zone
- Kill zone
- List of established military terms
- No-go area
- Oklahoma panhandle
- Neutral Ground of Westchester County in the Revolutionary War
- Terra nullius
