= Tierra de Nadie =

Tierra de Nadie (Sp for "No mans land") may refer to:

- Tierra de Nadie (Barón Rojo album), a 1987 album by Spanish heavy metal band Barón Rojo
- Tierra de Nadie (Ana Gabriel album), a 1988 album by Mexican pop singer Ana Gabriel
- Tierra de nadie (UCV), a green space at the Central University of Venezuela
- Tierra de Nadie, a 1998 album by Hevia
