= The Language of the Genes =

Popular science book by Steve Jones

- First edition
- Author: Steve Jones
- Language: English
- Subject: Genetics, Evolution
- Genre: Non-fiction
- Publication date: 1993
- ISBN: 0-00-255020-2

The Language of the Genes (HarperCollins, ISBN 0-00-255020-2) is a popular science book by Steve Jones about genetics and evolution. It followed a 1991 series of Reith Lectures by Jones with the same title. The book introduces all different aspects of genetics and molecular biology, and the new editions contain information about the frontiers of the field, such as the Human Genome Project. The first edition was published in 1993 and won the Rhône-Poulenc Prize (now known as the Royal Society Prizes for Science Books).

The title of the book is partly the result of Jones' regular use of a metaphor of nucleotides as letters, codons as words and genes as sentences, but also reflecting Jones' short explanation of language's role in human evolution.

A second revised and expanded edition (ISBN 0-006-55243-9) was published by Flamingo on 18 September 2000.
