= David Quammen =

American science and nature writer (born 1948)

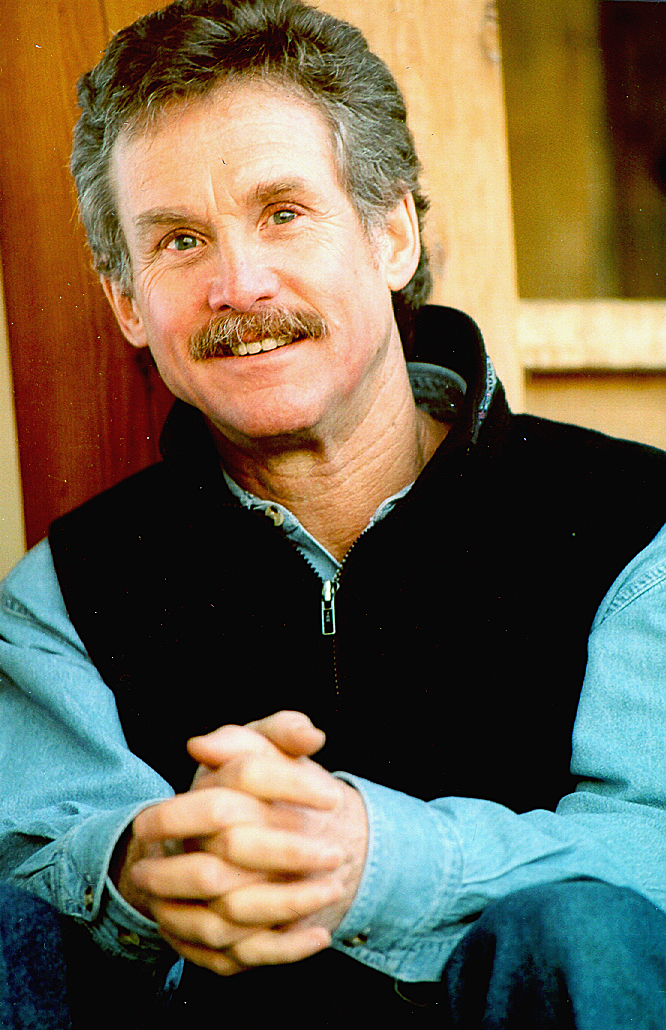
- Born: February 24, 1948 (age 78); Cincinnati, Ohio, U.S.
- Education: Yale University (BA); University of Oxford (BLitt)
- Spouse: Betsy Gaines Quammen
- Writing career
- Genre: Non-fiction
- Website: davidquammen.com

David Quammen (born February 24, 1948) is an American writer focusing on science, nature, and travel. He is the author of fifteen books. Quammen's articles have appeared in Outside, National Geographic, Harper's Magazine, Rolling Stone, The New York Times Book Review, The New Yorker, and other periodicals. He is also a science communicator.

A collection of Quammen's drafts, research, and correspondence is housed in Texas Tech University's Southwest Collection/Special Collections Library. The collection consists of approximately 63 boxes of publicly available literary production, artifacts, maps, and other papers dated from 1856 to 2014.

== Early life and education ==
David Quammen was born on February 24, 1948, to W.A. and Mary Quammen. He was raised in the suburbs of Cincinnati, Ohio, and graduated from St. Xavier High School in 1966. He attended and graduated from Yale University. In 1970 he was awarded a Rhodes Scholarship, enabling him to study at University of Oxford.

During his graduate work at Oxford, he studied literature, concentrating on the works of American writer William Faulkner. After completing his education and publishing his first novel, he relocated to Bozeman, Montana. He has continued to live there with his wife, Betsy (Gaines) Quammen, a conservation activist.

== Career ==
In the early 1970s, Quammen moved to Montana for trout fishing. In 1983, he finished The Soul of Viktor Tronko, a spy novel based on Russian historical events. A year later, the story collection Blood Line: Stories of Fathers and Sons was published. Following the commercial failure of his fictional works, Quammen began transitioning into a nonfiction writer.

In 1981, Quammen began writing columns for Outside Magazine, and continued for fifteen years. Some of the columns from Outside Magazine and others contributed to Quammen's nonfiction books: Natural Acts (1985), The Flight of the Iguana (1988), Wild Thoughts from Wild Places (1998), and The Boilerplate Rhino (2000).

Later in 1999, Quammen began to write a series of three stories following J. Michael Fay's 2000-mile hike through Central Africa for National Geographic. During this time, Quammen walked with Fay for eight weeks along African river basins. Quammen continued working with National Geographic, holding a Contributing Writer position, producing cover stories like "Was Darwin Wrong?" and "The Short Happy Life of a Serengeti Lion."

From 2007 to 2009, Quammen was employed as the Wallace Stegner Professor of Western American Studies at Montana State University. Quammen received honorary doctorates from Montana State University and Colorado College. For his work, Quammen was awarded a Guggenheim Fellowship in 1988, and a Lannan Literary Award for nonfiction in 1997.

His book Spillover: Animal Infections and the Next Human Pandemic (2012) received two awards: the 2013 Science in Society Book Award, given by the National Association of Science Writers, and the Royal Society of Biology (UK) Book Award in General Biology. In 2013, Spillover was shortlisted for the PEN/E. O. Wilson Literary Science Writing Award. The Song of the Dodo (Scribner, 1996), a study of the bird's extinction won the John Burroughs Medal for nature writing.

== Books ==
=== Non-fiction ===
External videos
- In Depth interview with Quammen, June 4, 2023, C-SPAN
- Presentation by Quammen on Monster of God, September 30, 2003, C-SPAN
- Presentation by Quammen on Spillover, October 12, 2012, C-SPAN
- Presentation by Quammen on The Tangled Tree, September 11, 2018, C-SPAN
- Presentation by Quammen on Breathless, October 25, 2022, C-SPAN
- Presentation by Quammen on Breathless, February 18, 2023, C-SPAN

- Quammen, David. Natural Acts: a Sidelong View of Science and Nature. New York: Schocken Books, 1985.
- Quammen, David. The Flight of the Iguana: a Sidelong View of Science and Nature. New York: Delacorte Press, 1988.
- Quammen, David. "Miracle of the Geese." Words from the Land: Encounters with Natural History Writing. Salt Lake City: Peregrine Smith Books, 1988.
- Quammen, David. The Song of the Dodo: Island Biogeography in an Age of Extinctions. New York: Scribner, 1996.
- Quammen, David. Wild Thoughts From Wild Places. New York: Scribner, 1999.
- Quammen, David, ed. Best American Science and Nature Writing. Boston: Mariner Books, 2000.
- Quammen, David. The Boilerplate Rhino: Nature in the Eye of the Beholder. New York: Scribner, 2001.
- Quammen, David. Monster of God: The Man-Eating Predator in the Jungles of History and the Mind. New York, W. W. Norton, 2003.
- Quammen, David. Alexis Rockman. New York: Monacelli Press, 2004.
- Quammen, David. The Reluctant Mr. Darwin: An Intimate Portrait of Charles Darwin and the Making of His Theory of Evolution. New York: W. W. Norton, 2006.
- Quammen, David. The Kiwi's Egg: Charles Darwin and Natural Selection. London: Weidenfeld & Nicolson, 2007.
- Quammen, David. Spillover: Animal Infections and the Next Human Pandemic. New York: Norton, 2012. ISBN 978-0-393-06680-7
- Quammen, David. Ebola: The Natural and Human History of a Deadly Virus. New York: Norton, 2014.
- Quammen, David. The Chimp and the River: How AIDS emerged from an African Forest. New York: Norton, 2015.
- Quammen, David. Yellowstone: A Journey Through America's Wild Heart. National Geographic, 2016.
- Quammen, David. The Tangled Tree: A Radical New History of Life. New York: Simon & Schuster, 2019.
- Quammen, David. Breathless: The Scientific Race to Defeat a Deadly Virus. New York: Simon & Schuster, 2022.

=== Fiction ===
- Quammen, David. "Walking Out,'" short story, 1980.
- Quammen, David. The Zolta Configuration. New York: Doubleday Books, 1983.
- Quammen, David. To Walk the Line. New York: Pocket Books, 1985.
- Quammen, David. The Soul of Viktor Tronko. New York: Dell,1987.
- Quammen, David. Blood Line: Stories of Father and Sons. Boulder: Johnson Books, 1988.

== Awards and accolades ==
- 1970 Rhodes Scholarship
- 1987 National Magazine Award
- 1988 Guggenheim Fellowship
- 1994 National Magazine Award
- 1996 Academy Award in Literature from the American Academy of Arts and Letters
- 1996 Natural World Book Prize
- 1997 Helen Bernstein Book Award for Excellence in Journalism
- 1997 Lannan Foundation Fellowship
- 1997 John Burroughs Medal for nature writing
- 2000 Honorary doctorate from Montana State University
- 2001 PEN/Spielvogel-Diamonstein Award for the Art of the Essay for The Boilerplate Rhino
- 2005 National Magazine Award
- 2009 Honorary doctorate from Colorado College
- 2012 The Stephen Jay Gould Prize from the Society for the Study of Evolution
- 2013 Andrew Carnegie Medal for Excellence in Nonfiction, finalist for Spillover
- 2013 Science in Society Book Award, for Spillover
- 2013 Royal Society of Biology (UK) Book Award in General Biology, for Spillover

== See also ==
- Edward Abbey
