= George Monbiot =

English writer and political activist (born 1963)

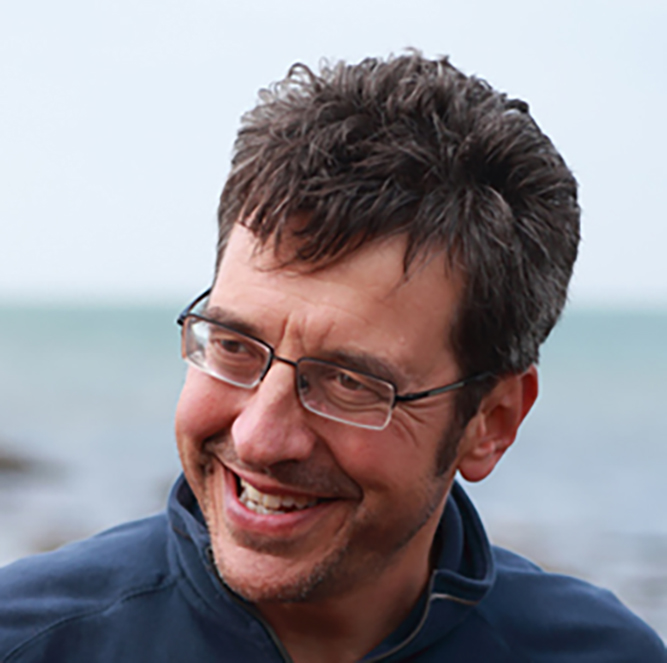
- Monbiot in 2013
- Born: 27 January 1963 (age 63); London, England
- Education: Brasenose College, Oxford
- Occupation: Journalist
- Spouse: Angharad Penrhyn Jones (m. 2006; div. 2010)
- Children: 2
- Awards: United Nations Global 500 Award (1995)
- George Monbiot's voice from the BBC programme Costing the Earth, 19 March 2013
- Website: monbiot.com

George Joshua Richard Monbiot (/ˈmɒnbioʊ/ MON-bee-oh; born 27 January 1963) is an English journalist, author, and environmental and political activist. He writes a regular column for The Guardian and has written several books.

Monbiot grew up in Oxfordshire in a Jewish family and studied zoology at the University of Oxford. He then began a career in investigative journalism, publishing his first book Poisoned Arrows in 1989 about human rights issues in West Papua. In later years, he has been involved in activism and advocacy related to various issues, such as climate change, British politics, and loneliness. In Feral (2013), he discussed and endorsed expansion of rewilding. He is the founder of The Land is Ours, a campaign for the right of access to the countryside and its resources in the United Kingdom. Monbiot was awarded the Global 500 in 1995 and the Orwell Prize in 2022.

== Early life and education ==
Born in Kensington, Monbiot grew up in Rotherfield Peppard, Oxfordshire. His father, Raymond Monbiot, was a businessman who headed the Conservative Party's trade and industry forum. His mother, Rosalie (daughter of Gresham Cooke MP), was a Conservative councillor and former leader of South Oxfordshire District Council. His uncle, Canon Hereward Cooke, was the Liberal Democrat deputy leader of Norwich City Council.

After preparatory boarding school at Elstree School, he was educated at Stowe School, in Buckinghamshire. He won an open scholarship to Brasenose College, Oxford. Monbiot has stated that his "political awakening" was prompted by reading Bettina Ehrlich's book Paolo and Panetto while at his prep school, and that he regretted attending Oxford.

== Career ==
Monbiot in conversation with Silver Donald Cameron about his work in 2014

After graduating with a degree in zoology, Monbiot joined the BBC Natural History Unit as a radio producer, making natural history and environmental programmes. He transferred to the BBC's World Service, where he worked briefly as a current affairs producer and presenter, before leaving to research and write his first book.

Working as an investigative journalist, he travelled in Indonesia, Brazil, and East Africa. His activities led to his being made persona non grata in seven countries and being sentenced to life imprisonment in absentia in Indonesia. In these places he was also shot at, brutally beaten up and arrested by military police, shipwrecked and stung into a poisoned coma by hornets. He came back to work in Britain after having been pronounced clinically dead in Lodwar General Hospital in north-western Kenya, having contracted cerebral malaria.

He joined the British roads protest movement and was often called to give press interviews; as a result he was denounced as a "media tart" by groups such as Green Anarchist and Class War. He claims he was brutally beaten and attacked by security guards, who allegedly drove a metal spike through his foot, smashing the middle metatarsal bone. His injuries left him in hospital. Sir Crispin Tickell, a former United Nations diplomat, who was then Warden at Green College, Oxford, made the young protester a visiting fellow.

In November 2012, he apologised to Lord McAlpine for his "stupidity and thoughtlessness" in implying, in a tweet, that the Conservative peer was a paedophile.

In 2014, Monbiot wrote an article on the theme of loneliness. This led to a collaboration with musician Ewan McLennan. Together they released an album Breaking the Spell of Loneliness in October 2016 followed by a tour of the UK. Folk Radio described it as "an enthralling album" where "Each song is a short, eloquent and thought provoking essay on the destruction of our humanity and how it can be regained".

Monbiot narrated the video How Wolves Change Rivers which was based on his TED talk of 2013 on the restoration of ecosystems and landscape (rewilding) when wolves were reintroduced to Yellowstone Park. In 2019, Monbiot co-presented Nature Now, a video about natural climate solutions, with Greta Thunberg. Monbiot appeared in the documentary The Cost of Living: Does Britain Need a Basic Income?, a companion piece to the film The Future of Work and Death, about UBI in the UK – released on Amazon Prime in 2020. He appeared in the 2021 Netflix documentary Seaspiracy, which focuses on the human impact on marine life and fishing, and defended it from critics.

In 2021, Monbiot created the live documentary Rivercide, highlighting the lamentable state of the UK's rivers, and in particular the River Wye.

While describing the film Don't Look Up in early 2022, Monbiot explained how difficult it is to campaign for the preservation of Earth in the face of what he sees as overwhelming inaction.

In 2024, Monbiot appeared in the British documentary film I Could Never Go Vegan.

== Views and activism ==
=== Peak oil ===
In the early 2000s, Monbiot predicted that global production of oil "will peak before long". In his article, titled "The Bottom of the Barrel", he wrote:

The most optimistic projections are the ones produced by the US Department of Energy, which claims that this will not take place until 2037. But the US energy information agency has admitted that the government's figures have been fudged: it has based its projections for oil supply on the projections for oil demand,(5) perhaps in order not to sow panic in the financial markets. Other analysts are less sanguine. The petroleum geologist Colin Campbell calculates that global extraction will peak before 2010.(6) In August the geophysicist Kenneth Deffeyes told New Scientist that he was "99 per cent confident" that the date of maximum global production will be 2004. Even if the optimists are correct, we will be scraping the oil barrel within the lifetimes of most of those who are middle-aged today.

The supply of oil will decline, but global demand will not. Today we will burn 76 million barrels; by 2020 we will be using 112 million barrels a day, after which projected demand accelarates [sic]. If supply declines and demand grows, we soon encounter something with which the people of the advanced industrial economies are unfamiliar: shortage. The price of oil will go through the roof.

— George Monbiot, The Guardian, 2 December 2003

=== Climate change ===
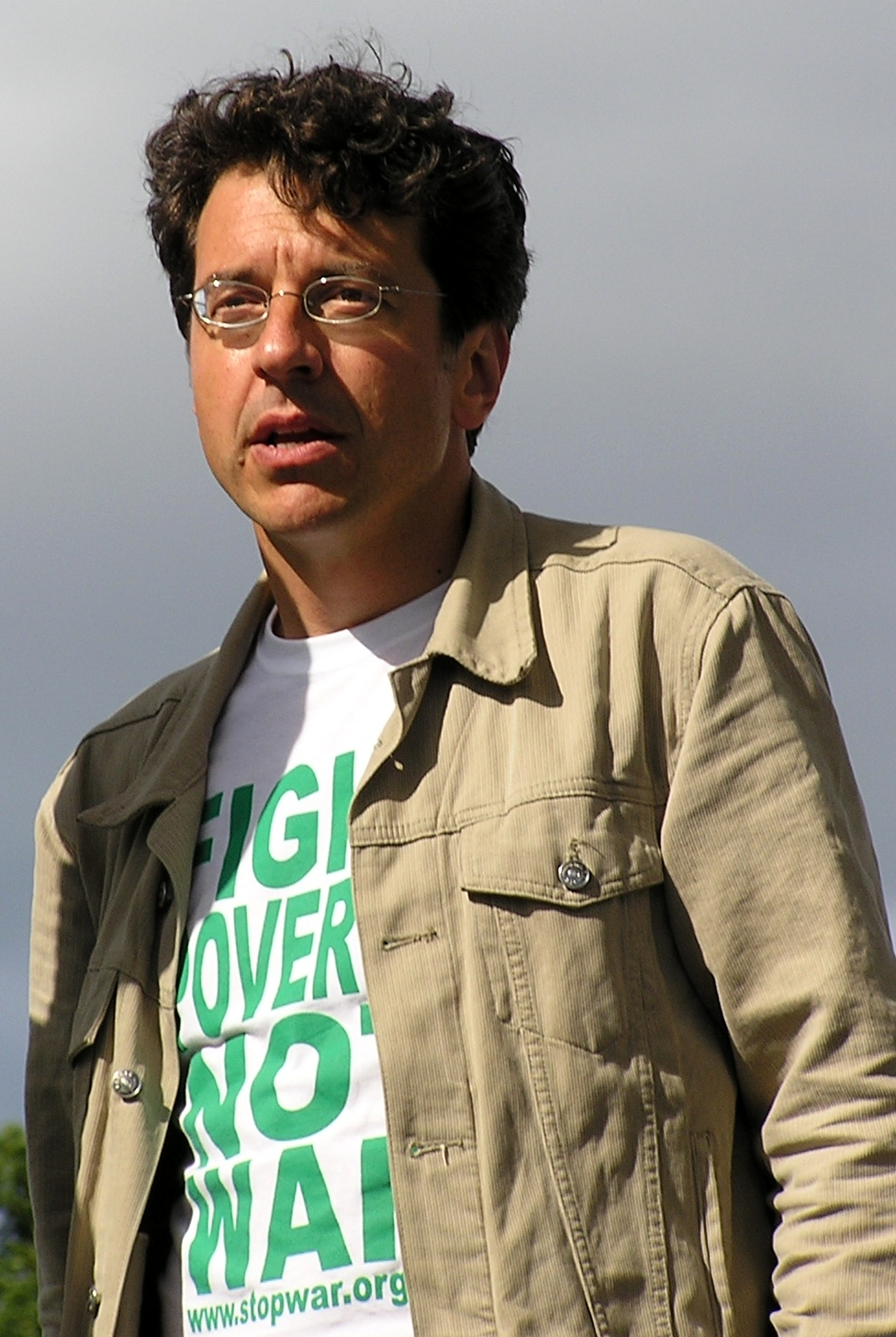
Monbiot at a Make Poverty History rally in Edinburgh, July 2005

Monbiot believes that drastic action coupled with strong political will is needed to combat global warming. He supports the introduction of the crime of ecocide to the International Criminal Court stating "I believe [a crime of ecocide] would change everything. It would radically shift the balance of power, forcing anyone contemplating large-scale vandalism to ask themselves: 'Will I end up in the international criminal court for this?' It could make the difference between a habitable and an uninhabitable planet."

To reduce his personal impact on the environment, he has transitioned to a vegan lifestyle and encourages others to do the same.

=== Media ===
Monbiot has criticised media coverage of climate change and environmental issues, in particular that of the BBC and its nature documentaries. He has also criticised the BBC for what he views as its political bias.

=== Attempted arrest of John Bolton ===
Monbiot made an unsuccessful attempt to carry out a citizen's arrest of John Bolton, a former US ambassador to the United Nations, when the latter attended the Hay Festival to give a talk on international relations in May 2008. Monbiot argued that Bolton was one of the instigators of the Iraq War, of which Monbiot was an opponent.

=== Politics ===
After Monbiot visited the remote Baliem Valley and criticised the Indonesian government's transmigration program and other policies in Western New Guinea, Indonesian authorities sentenced him in absentia to life imprisonment.

Monbiot is a critic of neoliberalism. In January 2004, Monbiot and Salma Yaqoob co-founded Respect – The Unity Coalition (later formally the Respect Party) which grew out of the Stop the War Coalition. He resigned from the group the following February when Respect failed to reach agreement with the Green Party not to stand candidates in the same constituencies in the forthcoming 2004 European Parliament election.

In an interview with the British political blog Third Estate in September 2009, Monbiot expressed his support for the policies of Plaid Cymru, saying "I have finally found the party that I feel very comfortable with. That's not to say I feel uncomfortable with the Green Party, on the whole I support it, but I feel even more comfortable with Plaid."

In April 2010, he was a signatory to an open letter of support for the Liberal Democrats, published in The Guardian. Prior to the May 2015 general election, he was one of several public figures who endorsed the parliamentary candidacy of the Green Party's Caroline Lucas. In the election he also endorsed the Green Party as a whole. In August 2015, Monbiot endorsed Jeremy Corbyn's campaign in the Labour Party leadership election. In April 2017, he announced his intention to vote for the Labour Party in the 2017 general election. In August 2021, he endorsed Tamsin Omond and Amelia Womack in the 2021 Green Party of England and Wales leadership election.

Monbiot, who has warned that Britain is at risk of becoming a failed state, is a supporter of Scottish independence, Welsh independence and Irish reunification. On 11 February 2021, whilst on BBC Two's Politics Live, he said, "If I lived in Scotland, I'd want to get out of this corrupt, dysfunctional, chaotic union as quickly as possible. And the same applies to Wales, the same applies to Northern Ireland. I can't see the point of staying in the United Kingdom, of being chained to the United Kingdom like a block of concrete, as the boat begins to founder."

Monbiot has criticised linguist and political activist Noam Chomsky, arguing on Twitter in November 2017 that "Part of the problem is that a kind of cult has developed around Noam Chomsky and John Pilger, which cannot believe they could ever be wrong, and produces ever more elaborate conspiracy theories to justify their mistakes."

Monbiot offered public support to protest group Palestine Action when the UK government was considering proscribing it as a terrorist organisation in June 2025.

=== Nuclear energy ===
Monbiot once expressed deep antipathy to the nuclear industry. He then rejected his later neutral position regarding nuclear power in March 2011. Although he "still loathe[s] the liars who run the nuclear industry", Monbiot now advocates its use, having been convinced of its relative safety by what he considers the limited effects of the 2011 Japan tsunami on nuclear reactors in the region. Subsequently, he has harshly condemned the anti-nuclear movement, writing that it "has misled the world about the impacts of radiation on human health ... made [claims] ungrounded in science, unsupportable when challenged and wildly wrong." He singled out Helen Caldicott for, he wrote, making unsourced and inaccurate claims, dismissing contrary evidence as part of a cover-up, and overstating the death toll from the Chernobyl disaster by a factor of more than 140.

In October 2013 Monbiot criticised the selection of a generation III reactor design for the Hinkley Point C nuclear power station due to cost as well as for a half century requirement of uranium mining and transuranic waste production; he contrasted this with two generation IV reactor concepts: "if integral fast reactors were deployed, the UK's stockpile of nuclear waste could be used to generate enough low-carbon energy to meet all UK demand for 500 years. These reactors would keep recycling the waste until hardly any remained: solving three huge problems – energy supply, nuclear waste and climate change – at once. Thorium reactors use an element that's already extracted in large quantities as an unwanted byproduct of other mining industries. They recycle their own waste, leaving almost nothing behind." (cf. similar comments by James Hansen)

George Monbiot interview with The Green Interview

== Published works ==
Monbiot's weekly column for The Guardian has covered a variety of issues, concentrating on political philosophy in relation to ecological and social problems, particularly in the United Kingdom.

Monbiot's first book was Poisoned Arrows (1989), concerning the partially World Bank-funded transmigration program on the peoples and tribes of West Papua. It was followed by Amazon Watershed (1991), which documents the expulsions of Brazilian peasant farmers from their land. His third book, No Man's Land: An Investigative Journey Through Kenya and Tanzania (1994), documented the seizure of land and cattle from nomadic people in Kenya and Tanzania.

In 2000, he published Captive State: The Corporate Takeover of Britain in which Monbiot argues that corporate power in the United Kingdom is a serious threat to democracy. His fifth book, The Age of Consent: A Manifesto for a New World Order, was published in 2003. The book is an attempt to set out a positive manifesto for change for the global justice movement.

Monbiot's next book, Heat: How to Stop the Planet Burning, published in 2006, focused on the issue of climate change. Feral: Searching for Enchantment on the Frontiers of Rewilding was published in 2013, and focuses on the concept of rewilding the planet. In the book, Monbiot criticises sheep farming. The book received favourable reviews in The Spectator and The Daily Telegraph. It won the Society of Biology Book Award for general biology in 2014. Monbiot's 2022 book Regenesis focuses on the environmental impact of agriculture and sustainable approaches.

In 2024, The Invisible Doctrine: The Secret History of Neoliberalism (& How It Came to Control Your Life), by Monbiot and Peter Hutchison, an American documentary filmmaker and professor at NYU Tisch School of the Arts, was first a film and then the book was derived and published.

== Personal life ==
Monbiot has mostly lived in Oxford, but for a few years from 2007 he lived in a low emissions house in the market town of Machynlleth, Montgomeryshire, originally with his then-wife, writer and campaigner Angharad Penrhyn Jones, and their daughter. His new partner lives in Oxford and Monbiot returned there by 2012. The couple's daughter, Monbiot's second, was born in early 2012. In December 2017, Monbiot was diagnosed with prostate cancer; he had surgery in March 2018. In 2022, he moved to South Devon.

== Awards ==
In 1995, Nelson Mandela presented him with a United Nations Global 500 Award for outstanding environmental achievement. He won the Sir Peter Kent award 1991 prize for his book Amazon Watershed. In November 2007, his book Heat was awarded the Premio Mazotti, an Italian book prize, but he was denied the money given with the prize because he chose not to travel to Venice to collect it in person, arguing that it was not a good enough reason to justify flying. In 2017, he was a recipient of the SEAL Environmental Journalism Award for his work at The Guardian.

In 2022, Monbiot was awarded The Orwell Prize for Journalism.

== Selected works ==
- (1989). Poisoned Arrows: An investigative journey through the forbidden lands of West Papua. London: Abacus. ISBN 0-7181-3153-3
- (1991). Amazon Watershed: The new environmental investigation. London: Abacus. ISBN 0-7181-3428-1
- (1992). Mahogany is Murder: Mahogany Extraction from Indian Reserves in Brazil. ISBN 1-85750-160-8
- (1994). No Man's Land: An Investigative Journey Through Kenya and Tanzania. Picador. ISBN 0-333-60163-7
- (2000). Captive State: The Corporate Takeover of Britain. Macmillan. ISBN 0-333-90164-9
- (2003). The Age of Consent. Flamingo. ISBN 0-00-715042-3
- (2004). Manifesto for a New World Order. The New Press. ISBN 1-56584-908-6
- (2006). Heat: How to Stop the Planet Burning. Allen Lane. ISBN 0-7139-9923-3
- (2008). Bring on the Apocalypse: Six Arguments for Global Justice. Atlantic Books. ISBN 978-1-84354-858-4
- (2013). Feral: Searching for Enchantment on the Frontiers of Rewilding. London: Penguin Books. ISBN 978-1-84614-748-7
- (2016). How Did We Get into This Mess?: Politics, Equality, Nature. London: Verso.
- (2017). Out of the Wreckage: A New Politics for an Age of Crisis. London: Verso. ISBN 978-1-78663-289-0
- (2022). Regenesis: Feeding the World without Devouring the Planet. London: Penguin Books. ISBN 978-0-14-313596-8
- (2024). The Invisible Doctrine: The Secret History of Neoliberalism (& How It Came to Control Your Life). ISBN 978-0-241-63590-2

== See also ==
- Individual and political action on climate change
