= Almost Like a Whale =

1999 nonfiction book by Steve Jones

Almost Like a Whale : The Origin of Species Updated
- Author: Steve Jones
- Language: English
- Subject: On the Origin of Species
- Publisher: Doubleday
- Publication date: 1999
- Publication place: United Kingdom
- Media type: Print (Hardcover and Paperback)
- Pages: 402
- ISBN: 978-0-385-40985-8
- OCLC: 41420544
- Dewey Decimal: 576.8 21
- LC Class: QH367 .J75 1999

Almost like a Whale by Steve Jones is a modern introduction to Charles Darwin's Origin of Species and closely follows its structure. It won the 1999 BP Natural World Book Prize.

An American version was published as Darwin's Ghost: The Origin of Species Updated (ISBN 978-0-375-50103-6).

The title refers to Darwin's observation that a bear, swimming in a lake and catching insects in its mouth, might conceivably evolve over time into a creature "almost like a whale". This statement attracted much ridicule at the time.
