= Tierra de nadie (Central University of Venezuela) =

Tierra de Nadie
UNESCO World Heritage Site
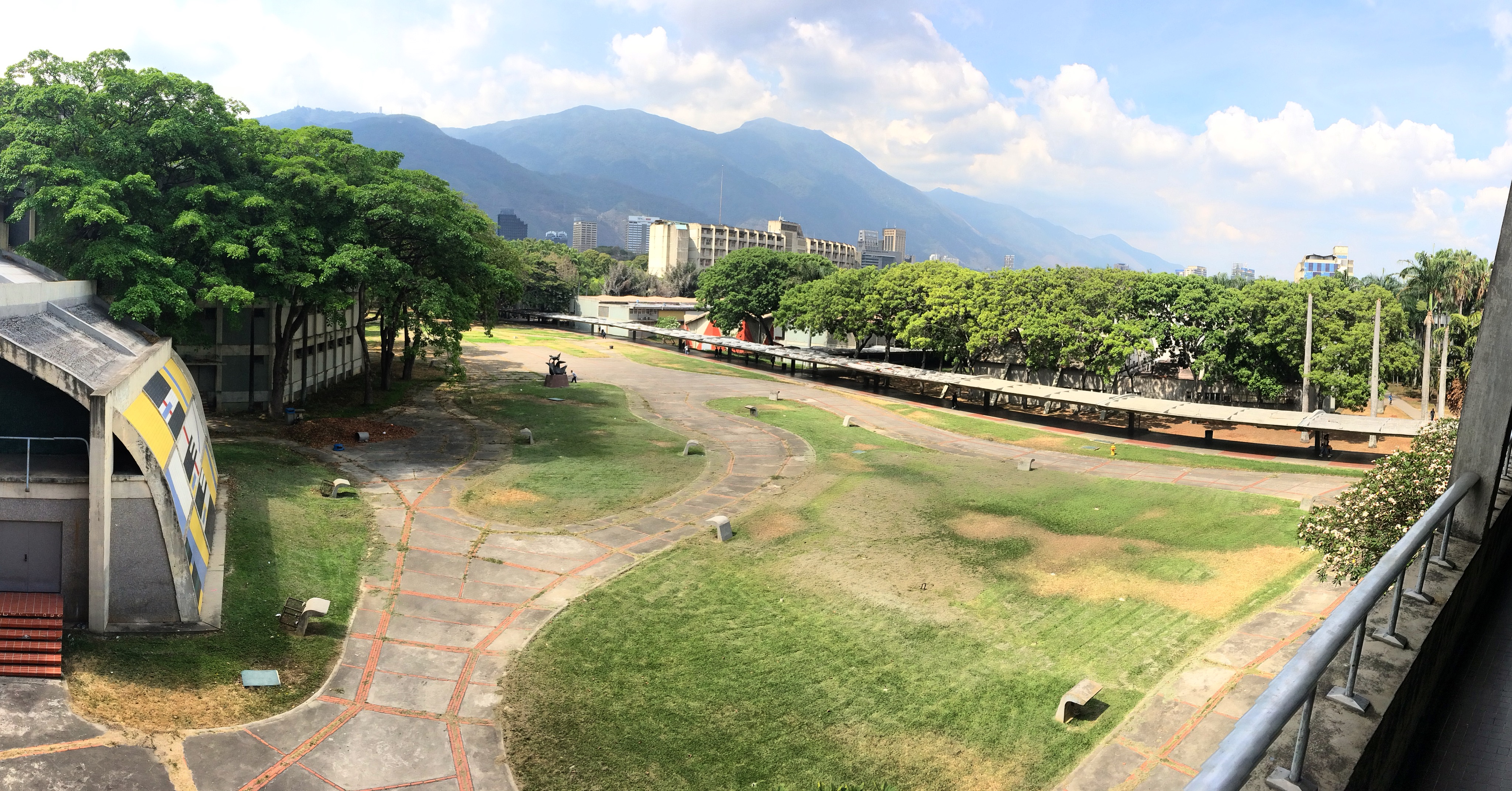
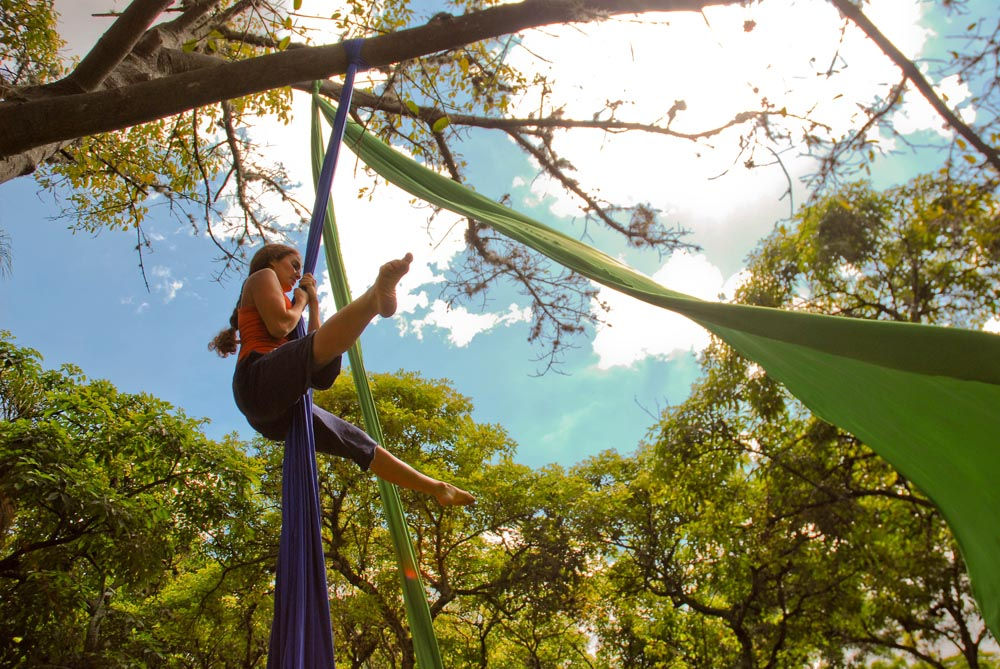
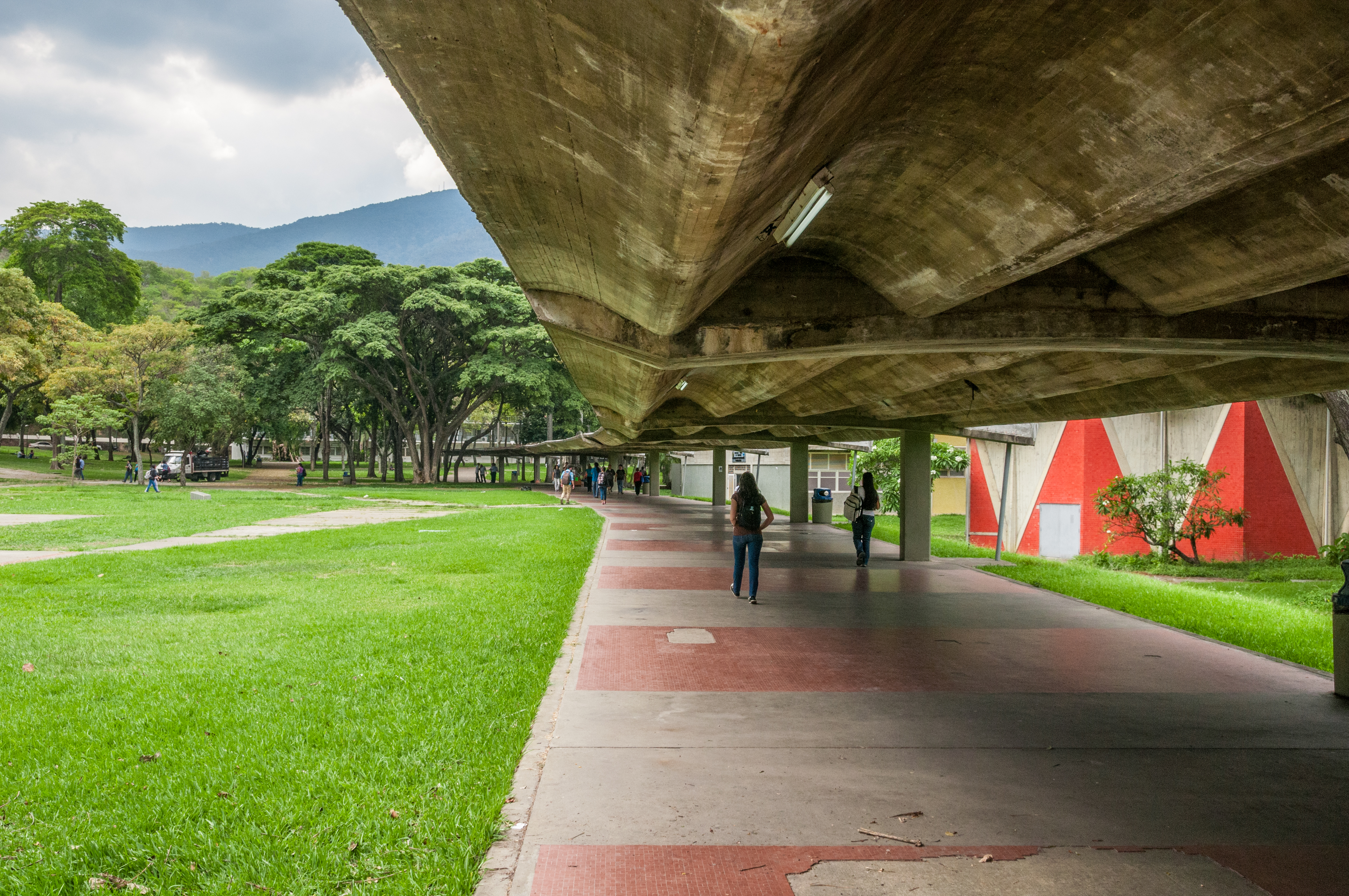

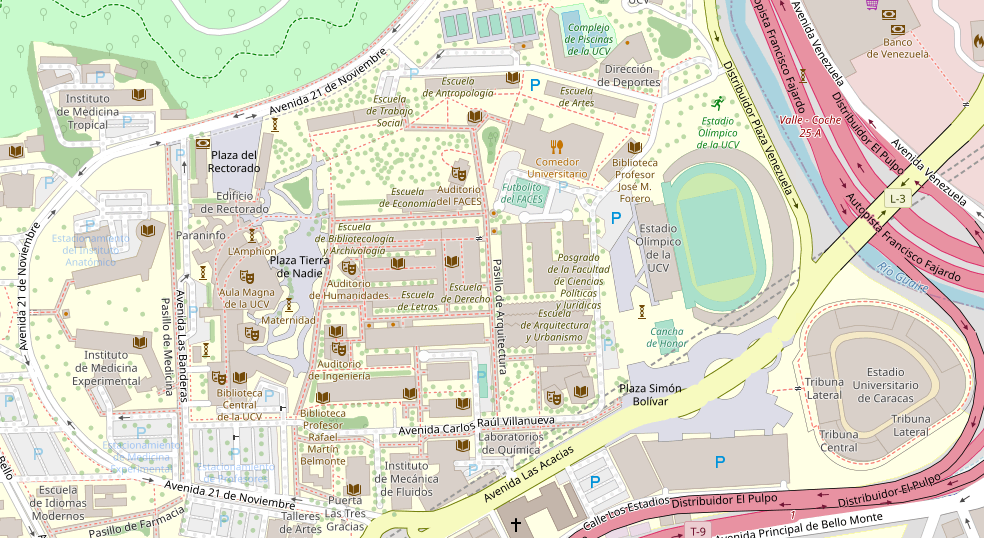
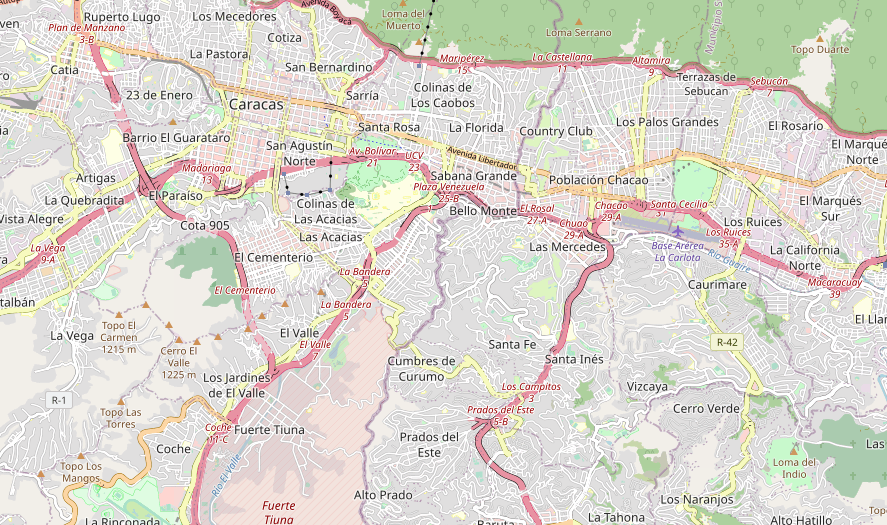
- Location within UCV Conjunto Central Location within Caracas Location within Venezuela
- Location: University City of Caracas, Venezuela
- Criteria: Cultural: (i), (iv)
- Reference: 986
- Inscription: 2000 (24th Session)
- Coordinates: 10°29′25.4″N 66°53′25.1″W

Tierra de nadie (No man's land) is the unofficial name of a public green space officially called Plaza Jorge Rodríguez in the University City of Caracas, the campus of the Central University of Venezuela.

== Location and history ==
It takes its name because it is an area that belongs to none of the faculties that surround it, serving as a shared space for the whole university community; it is one of the most recognized meeting places within the university. The spaces that border the Tierra de nadie include the Plaza del Rectorado, the Aula Magna, the Central library, the canteen of the university, and several faculty buildings. The area designated the Tierra de nadie also extends to a small wooded area to the north and northeast of the square. An old magazine of UCV's School of Social Communication was also named Tierra de nadie.

=== Violent crime ===
Though intended as a peaceful green space and in the center of a university campus, there have been several violent crimes in the Tierra de Nadie, as they have grown across the university as a whole. In 2015, a young man who was not a UCV student was killed in the plaza. In August 2017, a journalist out jogging was stabbed in the neck and face. He was found dead in the Tierra de nadie but had left a blood trail from a nearby academic building; it is believed he was trying to get from where he was stabbed to the hospital on the other side of the Central Complex. The murder may have been the result of resisting mugging. Muggings in the Tierra de nadie were quite common, with many reports leading to the arrest of a common thief in 2019.

== Artworks ==
In this area there are many monuments, plants and paths, including murals of the Rectory Plaza by Oswaldo Vigas that face the space, and the statues Maternidad by Baltasar Lobo and Monumento a los caídos de la generación del 28 by Ernest Maragall.

There is also a dedication plaque to honor Jorge Rodríguez Sr., a politician murdered by the government in 1976, which has been vandalised on several occasions, sometimes by the university's management and rector Cecilia García Arocha, as a response to the controversial man, his politics, and his son, Jorge Rodríguez.

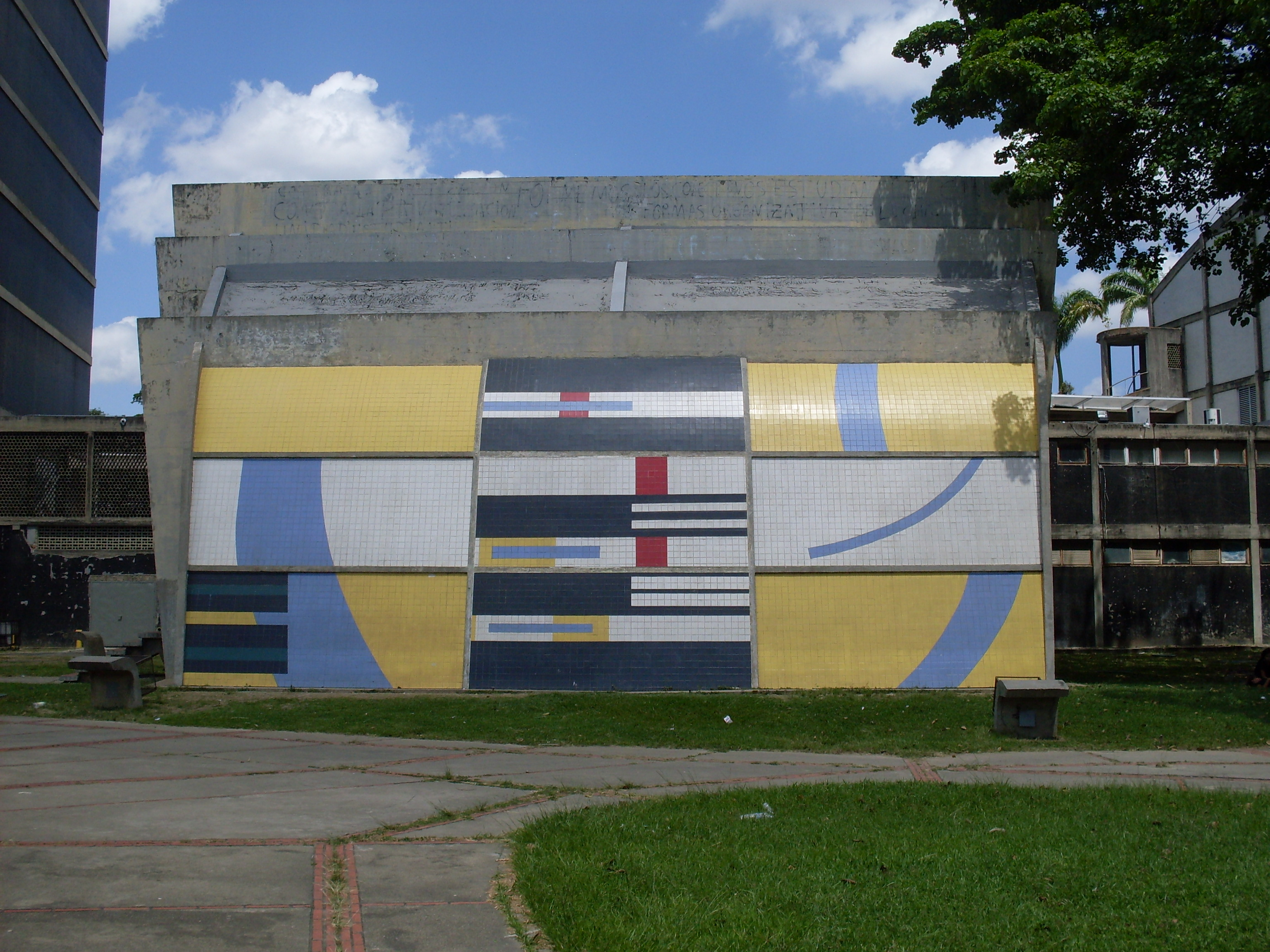
Mateo Manaure mural on the rear of the Sala de Conciertos

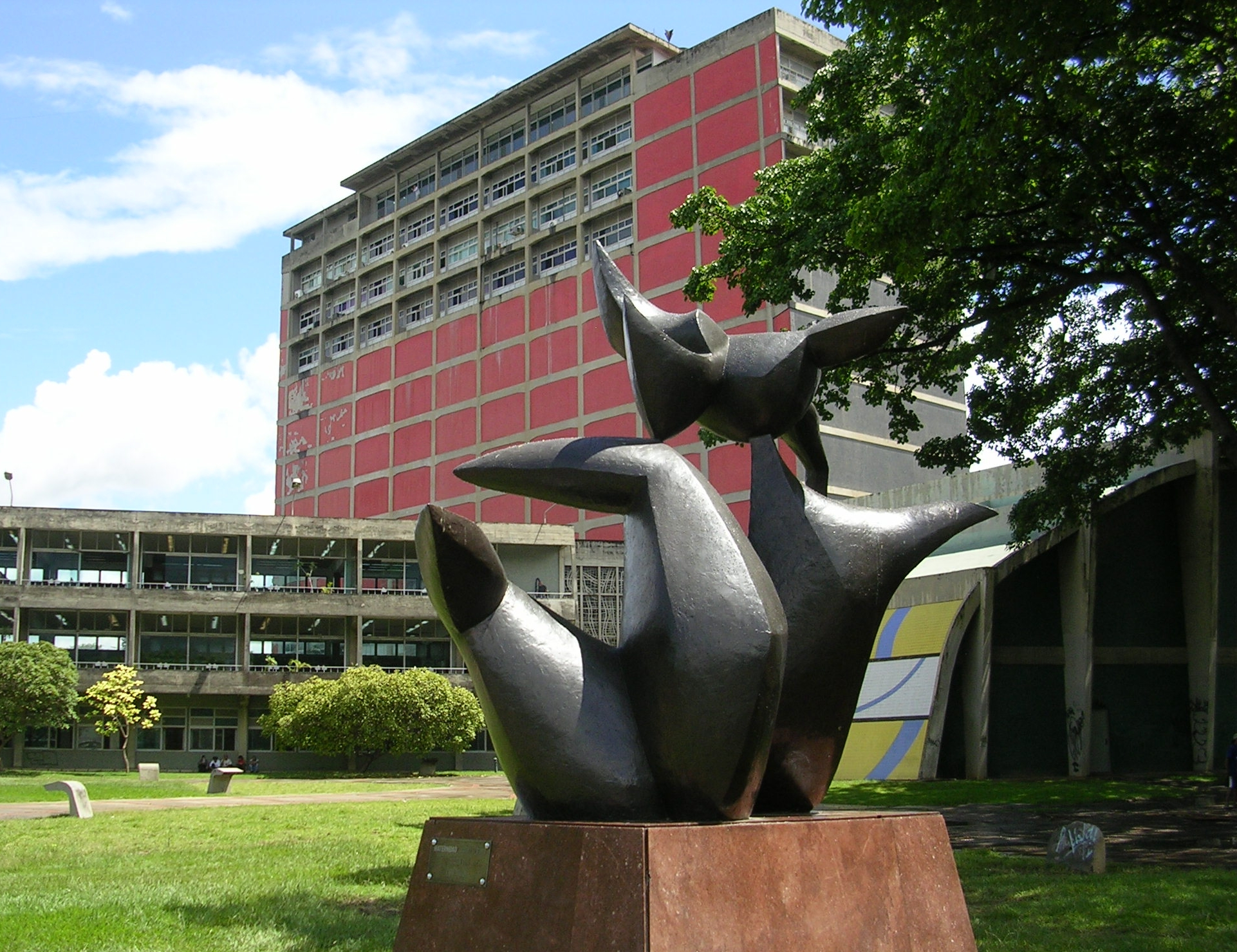
Maternidad

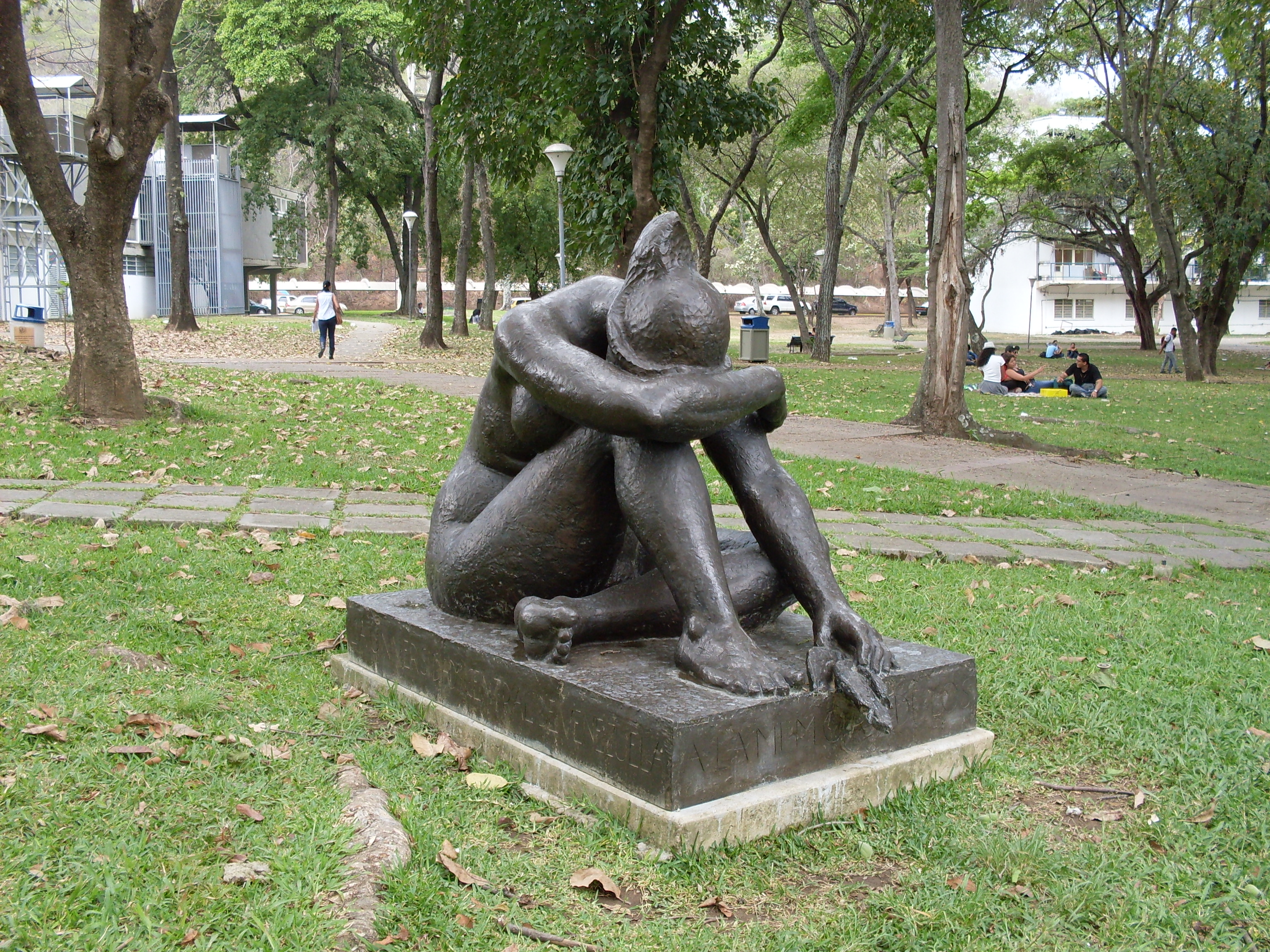
Monumento a los caídos de la generación del 28

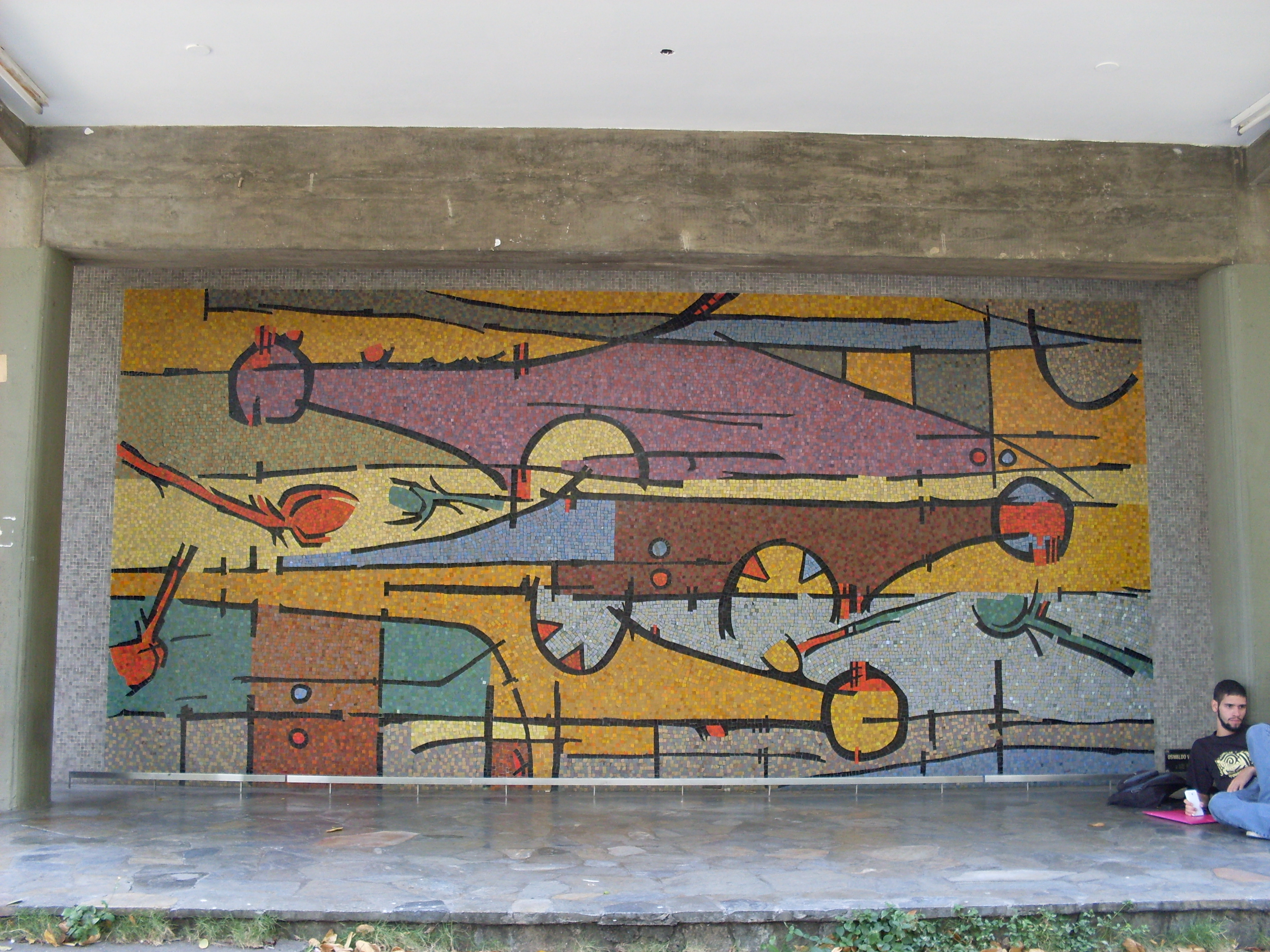
Un elemento - personaje triple

== See also ==
- Aula Magna (Central University of Venezuela)
- Carlos Raúl Villanueva
