= Steve Jones (biologist) =

British geneticist and biologist (born 1944)

Steve Jones FRS FRSL FLSW
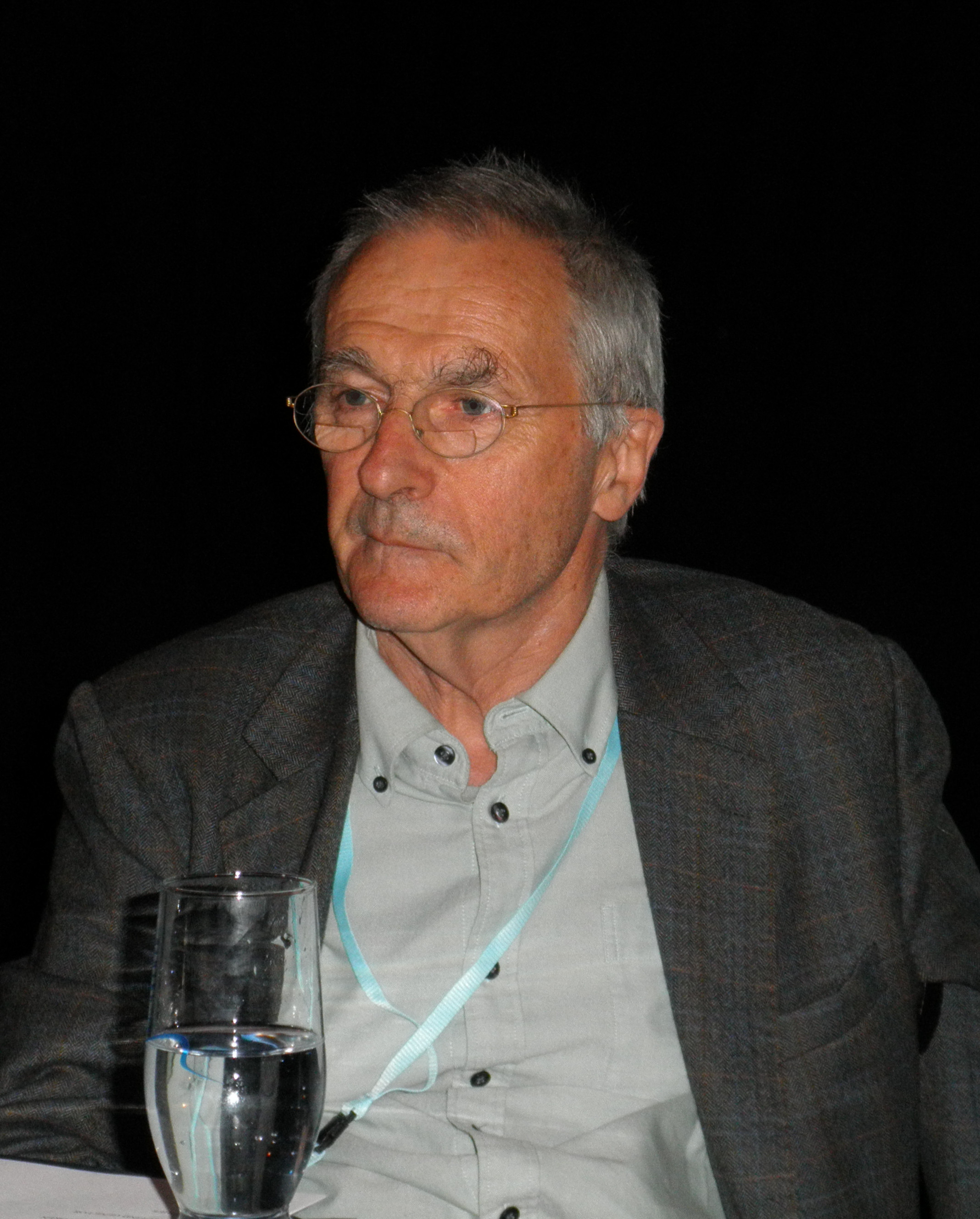
- Jones in 2012
- Born: John Stephen Jones; 24 March 1944 (age 82); Aberystwyth, Wales
- Education: University of Edinburgh (BSc, PhD)
- Known for: Books, journalism and broadcasting
- Spouse: Norma Percy (m. 2004)
- Awards: Michael Faraday Prize (1996)
- Scientific career
- Fields: Genetics; Malacology
- Workplaces: University College London; University of Edinburgh; University of Chicago
- Thesis: Studies on the ecological genetics of Cepaea (1972)
- Doctoral advisor: Bryan Clarke
- Website: iris.ucl.ac.uk/iris/browse/profile?upi=JSJON91

John Stephen Jones (born 24 March 1944) is a British geneticist and, from 1995 to 1999 as well as from 2008 to June 2010, Head of the Department of Genetics, Evolution and Environment at University College London.

He is a prize-winning author on biology, especially evolution. The Language of the Genes (1993), based on the Reith Lectures of the same name won the Royal Society Science Book Prize. Almost Like a Whale (1999) is an update of Charles Darwin's On the Origin of Species and closely follows its structure. In 1996, he won the Michael Faraday Prize.

== Early life and education ==
Jones was born in Aberystwyth, Wales, to Lydia Anne and Thomas Gwilym Jones. His parents met as students at the University of Aberystwyth. Until he was about ten years old the family lived alternately at his paternal grandparents' house in New Quay, Ceredigion, and his maternal grandparents' house near Aberystwyth. Later the family moved to the Wirral, returning to Wales for their holidays.

Jones's paternal grandfather and great-grandfather were both sea captains. Jones's father, a PhD chemist, worked on detergents such as Jif. His father was an acquaintance of Dylan Thomas. As a child, Jones often stayed at his paternal grandparents' home and spent a lot of his time in the attic which contained some seafaring equipment, and boxes of books covering a wide variety of topics, many of which Jones read. He also went to libraries and by the age of 14 had read the complete works of Charles Dickens.

As a child in Ceredigion, Jones spoke a lot of Welsh until he was six or seven years old, and as a keen observer of local wildlife was particularly interested in birds. Jones was a pupil at Wirral Grammar School for Boys. When he was 13 to 14 years old, Jones was inspired to study biology by a school teacher.

Jones was rejected by all the Welsh universities, so he applied to the University of Edinburgh for an undergraduate degree, which had a closing date seven days later, and he was accepted onto a zoology course. In 1967 he won the Gunning Victoria Jubilee Prize in Zoology for his essay, "Area effects and the structure of peripheral populations of Cepaea nemoralis". He stayed on in Edinburgh to do research for a Doctor of Philosophy degree on the ecological genetics of Cepaea, a snail whose shell is polymorphic in colour pattern, making it a model organism for evolutionary biologists. He developed an interest in snails from Bryan Clarke his PhD supervisor.

== Career and research ==
After his PhD, Jones also completed post-doctoral research into the genetics of Drosophila at the University of Chicago to widen his experience. Much of Jones's research has been concerned with snails and the light their study can shed on biodiversity and genetics.

=== Media and outreach ===
Jones was the 1991 Reith Lecturer on BBC Radio, with a series entitled The Language of the Genes, the basis of his 1993 book of the same name.

- Audio podcast: BBC Reith Lectures Archive: 1974 – 2010
- Transcripts: BBC Reith Lectures 1990 – 1999

For his Desert Island Discs book, Jones chose A Dance to the Music of Time. He explained: "There is a series of books by Anthony Powell called A Dance to the Music of Time, which actually is a really lovely way of describing evolution. If I´d to take just one of them it would be The Valley of Bones." He is a devotee of Johann Sebastian Bach. In 2005, he spoke about the composer in BBC's Bach Christmas broadcasts.

He presented In the Blood, a six-part television series on human genetics first broadcast in 1996, see book of same name in bibliography. In July 2011, Jones produced a report dealing with science reporting issues at the BBC. He was critical of the BBC for giving too much space and credence to maverick views on science, including deniers of anthropogenic global warming.

Jones was commissioned by the BBC Trust to write a report on the organisation's science reporting, which was published in July 2011. This was broadly supportive of the BBC's accuracy, impartiality and science coverage although it also made some suggestions. These included better interaction of staff across the organisation on science topics and in particular an end to "false balance". Jones describes "[a]ttempts to give a place to anyone, however unqualified, who claims interest can make for false balance: to free publicity to marginal opinions and not to impartiality, but its opposite". The BBC's response to the recommendations was generally positive, several of which it immediately implemented.

== Awards and honours ==
Jones was elected a Fellow of the Royal Society (FRS) in 2012. He won their Michael Faraday Prize in 1996 and delivered the Reith Lectures in 1991. He was elected to the American Philosophical Society in 2011. In 2011, he was elected a Fellow of the Learned Society of Wales (FLSW) and a Fellow of the Royal Society of Literature (FRSL).

== Personal life ==
Jones's life partner since 1977 has been American documentary maker Norma Percy; they married in 2004.

Jones is a patron of Humanists UK and an honorary associate of the National Secular Society. He was awarded the second Irwin Prize for Secularist of the Year by the National Secular Society on 7 October 2006. On 1 January 2011 he became President of The Association for Science Education.

=== Views on private education ===
In an interview on the BBC Radio 5 show 5 Live Breakfast, hosted by Nicky Campbell and Shelagh Fogarty on 13 January 2009, Jones described private schools as a "cancer on the education system". Jones cites private schools as one of the reasons that Britain remains as socially stratified as it is. Among the advantages in private schools compared to state schools, Jones listed smaller class sizes, highly trained teachers, better facilities, and coaching through university interviews.

=== Views on religion ===
Jones, along with 54 other public figures, signed an open letter published on 15 September 2010 in The Guardian, stating their opposition to Pope Benedict XVI's state visit to the UK. Jones has also stated that creationism is "anti-science" and criticised creationists such as Ken Ham. Jones suggested in a BBC Radio Ulster interview in 2006 that Creationists should be forbidden from being medical doctors because "all of its (Creationism's) claims fly in the face of the whole of science" and he further claimed that no serious biologist can believe in biblical creation. For Jones, 'evolution is the grammar of biology'. Jones elaborated on his full position on creationism in a public lecture entitled 'Why creationism is wrong and evolution is right'.

National Life Stories conducted an oral history interview (C1672/12) with Jones in 2015 for its Science and Religion collection held by the British Library.

=== Views on human evolution ===
Jones's view that in humans "Natural selection has to some extent been repealed" dates back at least to 1991 and has been the focus of newspaper reports and radio interviews. Referring to the title of a public lecture entitled "Is human Evolution Over?" he stated: "For those of you who have a train to catch, the answer is "yes", so you can leave now."

His views are largely based on his claim that reduced juvenile mortality, decreasing age of fathers, and decreased geographical isolation of populations in Western societies reduce evolution. Both the data supporting these assertions and his views of the way these factors influence evolution in populations have been extensively criticised by other academics.

== Publications ==
- The Language of the Genes. Flamingo. 1993. ISBN 0-00-655243-9. winner of (Aventis Prize winner)
- Jones, Steve; Van Loon, Borin (1993). Genetics for Beginners. Icon Books. ISBN 1-84046-636-7.
- Jones, Steve (1994). Martin, Robert D.; Pilbeam, David R. (eds.). The Cambridge Encyclopedia of Human evolution. Cambridge University Press. ISBN 0-521-46786-1.
- Jones, Steve (1997). In the Blood: God, Genes and Destiny. Houghton Mifflin. ISBN 0-00-255512-3.
- Jones, Steve (1999). Almost Like a Whale: The Origin of Species Updated. Doubleday. ISBN 0-385-40985-0.
- Jones, Steve (2000). Darwin's Ghost: The Origin of Species Updated. Ballantine Books. ISBN 0-345-42277-5.
- Jones, Steve (2003). Y: The Descent of Men. Flamingo. ISBN 0-618-13930-3.
- Jones, Steve (2006). The Single Helix: A Turn Around The World of Science. Little, Brown. ISBN 978-0-349-11940-3.
- Jones, Steve (2007). Coral. Little, Brown. ISBN 978-0-316-72938-3.
- Jones, Steve (2009). Darwin's Island: The Galapagos in the Garden of England. Little, Brown. ISBN 978-1-4087-0000-6.
- Jones, Steve (2013). The Serpent's Promise: The Bible Retold as Science. Little, Brown. ISBN 978-1-4087-0285-7.
- Jones, Steve (2016). No Need for Geniuses: Revolutionary Science in the Age of the Guillotine. Little, Brown. ISBN 978-0-3494-0545-2.
- Jones, Steve (26 January 2017). Evolution. illus. Rowan Clifford. London: Ladybird Books. ISBN 978-0-7181-8628-9.
- Jones, Steve (2019). Here Comes the Sun: How it feeds us, kills us, heals us and makes us what we are. Little, Brown. ISBN 978-1408711316.
