= No Man's Land (Greene novel) =

1950 novella by Graham Greene

First edition (publ. Hesperus Press)

No Man's Land is a novella by Graham Greene which was commissioned in 1950 by the film director Carol Reed, although it was not made into a film. The plot is set in Soviet-occupied East Germany shortly after World War II. No Man's Land was published, with a 1949 novella The Stranger's Hand and a foreword to both by David Lodge, in 2005.´
