= No Man's Land: An Investigative Journey Through Kenya and Tanzania =

- Author: George Monbiot
- Language: English
- Subjects: Tanzania, Kenya, inequality
- Published: London
- Publisher: Macmillan, Green Books
- Publication date: 1994
- Publication place: United Kingdom
- Media type: Print
- ISBN: 1903998263

No Man's Land: An Investigative Journey Through Kenya and Tanzania (1994; second edition 2003) is a book by the British writer and environmental and political activist George Monbiot.

== Summary ==
The book details Monbiot's travels through Kenya and Tanzania, the inequality and harsh conditions he witnesses, along with the natural beauty he observes.

== Reception ==
No Man's Land was praised by diverse sources, from Niall Ferguson in the Daily Mail, Oliver Tickell in the Daily Telegraph and in Africa Analysis, where it was described as 'An inquiring book by a sensitive man'. The book is listed at the bibliography of the Tanzania Development Trust, on the reading list of various University courses and as recommended reading by the Lonely Planet Kenya guide.
