= Deborah (given name) =

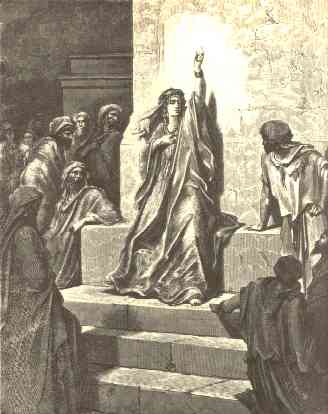
- The prophetess Deborah as imagined by Gustave Doré
- Pronunciation: /ˈdɛb(ə)rə/ DEB-(ə)-rə
- Gender: Female

Origin
- Origin: Hebrew

Other names
- Nicknames: Deb, Debs, Debby
- Related names: Deb, Debby, Debbie, Debra, Melissa (Greek)

Deborah (Hebrew: דְבוֹרָה) is a feminine given name derived from דבורה D'vorah, a Hebrew word meaning "bee". Deborah was a prophetess in the Old Testament Book of Judges. In the United States, the name was most popular from 1950 to 1970, when it was among the 20 most popular names for girls. It was the 25th most common name for women in the United States in the 1990 census. It has since fallen in popularity. It ranked as the 780th most popular name for baby girls born in 2007 in the United States, down from 676th most popular name in 2006.

The name is Débora in French, Débora in Portuguese and Spanish, Debora in Italian and Czech, and Δεββώρα or Δεβόρα in Greek.

== Variants ==
- Deb (English)
- Debbi (English)
- Debbie, Debby (English)
- Debbra (English)
- Debby (English)
- Debi (English)
- Debora (English)
- Deborha (Amharic)
- Debra (English)
- Deby (English)
- Devorah (Hebrew)
- Dibora (Amharic)
- Dvora or Dvorah (Hebrew)

== People ==
- Deborah Adair (born 1952 or 1953), American actress
- Debbie Allen (born 1950), American actress, dancer, choreographer, singer, director and producer
- Deborah Allan (born 1975), British former judoka
- Deborah Allen (born 1953), American country music singer and songwriter born Deborah Lynn Thurmond
- Deborah Amos, American journalist
- Deborah Andollo (born 1967), Cuban free diver
- Deborah Ayorinde (born 1987), British-Nigerian actress
- Deborah Boardman (born 1974), American lawyer and district judge
- Deborah Cavendish, Duchess of Devonshire (1920–2014), English aristocrat, writer, memoirist and socialite, one of the famous six Mitford sisters
- Deborah Charles, Saint Kitts and Nevis politician
- Deborah Cox (born 1974), Canadian singer, songwriter, actress and record producer
- Deb Cox (born 1958), Australian screenwriter and producer
- Deborah Davis (disambiguation)
- Debbie Dingell (born 1953), American politician
- Deborah Dultzin (1945–2026), Mexican astrophysicist
- Debórah Dwork, American historian
- Deborah Eisenberg (born 1945), American short story writer, actress and professor of writing
- Deborah Ellis (born 1960), Canadian fiction writer and activist
- Deborah Feldman (born 1986), American-German writer
- Deborah Foreman (born 1962), American actress
- Deborah Frances-White (born 1967), Australian-born British comedian, author and screenwriter
- Déborah François (born 1987), Belgian actress
- Debbie Gibson (born 1970), American singer, songwriter and actress
- Deborah Grant (born 1947), English actress
- Deborah Grant (artist) (born 1968), Canadian-born African-American artist
- Deborah Harkness (born 1965), American scholar, historian and novelist
- Debbie Harry (born 1945), American singer, songwriter and actress born Angela Trimble
- Deborah Kaplan (born 1970), American screenwriter and film director
- Deborah Kaplan (disability activist) (born 1950), American disability rights activist and attorney
- Deborah Kerr, stage name of British actress born Deborah Jane Trimmer (1921–2007)
- Deborah Klein Lopez, American politician
- Deborah Lacey, American actress
- Deborah Levy (born 1959), South African novelist, playwright and poet
- Deborah Lipstadt (born 1947), American historian and diplomat
- Deborah Mailman (born 1972), Australian actress
- Deborah Mathis (born 1953), American journalist and author
- Deborah Mayo, American philosopher of science and author
- Deborah McGuinness (born c. 1960), American computer scientist
- Deborah Meaden (born 1959), British businessperson and television personality
- Deborah Meier (born 1931), American educator, promoter of the modern small schools movement
- Deborah Moody, Lady Moody (1586–c. 1659), founder of Gravesend, Brooklyn, only European woman known to have founded a settlement in North America and first known female landowner in the New World
- Debbi Morgan (born 1951 or 1956), American actress
- Deborah Norville (born 1958), American television journalist, former news anchor and businesswoman
- Deborah Pratt (fl. 1975–present, American director, writer, television producer and actress
- Deborah Prentice (born 1961), American psychologist and university administrator
- Deborah Raffin (1953–2012), American actress
- Deborah Read (1708–1774), common-law wife of Benjamin Franklin
- Deborah Rennard (born 1960), American actress, writer and producer
- Deborah Roberts (born 1960), American television journalist
- Deborah Roberts (soprano) (1952–2024), British soprano
- Deborah Roberts (visual artist) (born 1962), American artist
- Debbie Rowe (born 1958), second wife of singer Michael Jackson
- Deborah Rush (born 1954), American actress
- Debby Ryan (born 1993), American actress and singer-songwriter
- Deborah Sampson (1760–1827), Massachusetts woman who fought in the Continental Army disguised as a man during the Revolutionary War
- Deborah Rhea Seehorn (born 1972), American actress and director
- Deborah Shelton American actress and Miss USA 1970
- Deborah Snyder (born 1969), American film and television ad producer, wife of filmmaker Zack Snyder
- Deborah Stipek, American educational psychologist and university administrator
- Deborah Kara Unger (born 1966), Canadian actress
- Deborah Van Valkenburgh (born 1952), American actress
- Deborah Voigt (born 1960), American operatic soprano
- Deborah Walley (1941–2001), American actress
- Deborah Ann Woll (born 1985), American actress
- Deborah Wood, co-founder of Deborah & Clare, a bespoke shirtmaker company in London from 1965 to 1973

== Fictional characters ==
- Deborah Vance, protagonist of the TV series Hacks
