= Deb (surname) =

Deb (Bengali: দেব) is a Bengali surname, commonly used by the Bengali Hindus of West Bengal, Tripura, Assam and Bangladesh. The surname is mostly found among the Bengali Kayastha and Baidya communities of India and Bangladesh. It is also a Swedish surname.

== History ==
In 12th–13th century, a Bengali Hindu dynasty Deva ruled over eastern Bengal after the Sena dynasty. The capital of this dynasty was Bikrampur in present-day Munshiganj district of Bangladesh. This Hindu Vaishnava dynasty is different from an earlier Buddhist Deva dynasty (c. 8th–9th century) of Samatata, whose capital was Devaparvata in Present-day Comilla district of Bangladesh. Four rulers of this dynasty are known from the inscriptions: Shantideva, Viradeva, Anandadeva and Bhavadeva.

== Geographical distribution ==
As of 2014, 56.8% of all known bearers of the surname Deb were residents of India and 40.3% were residents of Bangladesh. In India, the frequency of the surname was higher than national average in the following states:

1. Tripura (1: 46)
2. Meghalaya (1: 700)
3. Assam (1: 961)
4. Arunachal Pradesh (1: 1,026)
5. Nagaland (1: 1,497)
6. West Bengal (1: 2,528)

== Notable people ==
- Amiya Deb (1917–1983), Indian footballer, cricketer and field hockey player
- Ashok Kumar Deb, 20th–21st century Indian politician
- Ashutosh Deb (1803–1856), Indian musician and writer
- Bidyendu Mohan Deb (born 1942), Indian theoretical chemist, chemical physicist and professor
- Biplab Kumar Deb (born 1971), Indian politician, former Chief Minister of Tripura
- Chitra Deb (1943–2017), Indian Bengali novelist and editor
- Dasarath Deb (born 1916), Indian politician, former Chief Minister of Tripura
- Gautam Deb (born 1954), Indian politician
- Goutam Deb (born 1957), Indian politician
- Joy Deb (born 1979), Swedish songwriter
- Kalyanmoy Deb (born 1963), Indian computer scientist
- Linnea Deb (born 1977), Swedish singer, songwriter and record producer
- Manoj Kanti Deb (born 1972), Indian politician, former Minister of Food, Civil Supplies & Consumer Affairs, Industries & Commerce
- Nabakrishna Deb (1733–1797), King of Sovabazar
- Narendra Krishna Deb (1822–1903), Indian rajah and maharajah, grandson of Nabakrishna Deb
- Partha Sarathi Deb (1955/56–2024), Indian actor
- Prachi Dhabal Deb (born 1986), Indian artist
- Pratap Keshari Deb (born 1972), Indian politician
- Radhakanta Deb (1784–1867), Indian scholar
- Raja Narayan Deb, Indian composer
- Samar Deb (born 1963), Indian writer
- Sandipan Deb (born 1962), Indian journalist, editor and writer
- Sanjukta Deb, British professor of biomaterials science
- Siddhartha Deb (born 1970), Indian-born American author
- Sopan Deb (born 1988), American journalist
- Sushanta Deb (born 1990), Indian politician
- Tathoi Deb (born 1996), Indian actress
- Trisha Deb (born 1991), Indian archer

== See also ==
- Deb (disambiguation)
- Deb (given name)
- Debs (disambiguation)
