= Deby =

Deby may refer to:

- Idriss Déby (1952–2021), President of Chad and military officer
  - Brahim Déby (1980–2007), son of Idriss Déby
  - Mahamat Déby Itno (born 1983/1984), son of Idriss Déby; President of Chad since 2021
- Deby Callihan (fl. 1980), American poker player
- Deby LaPlante (born 1953), American retired hurdler
- Dęby (disambiguation), various places in Poland

== See also ==
- Debi (disambiguation)
- Debbi, a surname
- Debbie (disambiguation)
