= Dvora =

Dvora or Dvorah may refer to:

== People ==
- Dvorah Baron (1887–1956), a pioneering Jewish writer
- Dvorah Barzilay-Yegar (1933–2026), Israeli historian
- Dvora Bochman (born 1950), Israeli artist, painter, sculptor, graphic designer and art educator
- Dvora Hacohen (born 1937), Israeli historian and professor
- Dvora Kedar (1924–2023), Israeli actress
- Dvorah Rabinowitz Masovetsky (1907–2005), Zionist leader
- Dvora Netzer (1897–1989), Israeli politician
- Dvora Omer (1932–2013), children's book author
- Dvora Waysman, Australian-Israeli author
- Dvora Yanow, political ethnographer interpretive methodologist

== Other uses ==
- Dvora, Israel, a moshav
- Dvora-class fast patrol boat, used by Israel, Sri Lanka and the Republic of China
- Dvorah, a major character in Clan Apis, a graphic novel

== See also ==
- Devorah, another feminine given name
- Deborah (disambiguation)
- Super Dvora Mk II-class patrol boat
- Super Dvora Mk III-class patrol boat
