= List of the most popular names in the 1960s in the United States =

These are the most popular given names in the United States for all years of the 1960s.

== 1960 ==
- Males
  1. David
  2. Michael
  3. John
  4. James
  5. Robert
  6. Mark
  7. William
  8. Richard
  9. Thomas
  10. Steven
- Females
  1. Mary
  2. Susan
  3. Maria
  4. Karen
  5. Lisa
  6. Linda
  7. Donna
  8. Patricia
  9. Debra
  10. Deborah

== 1961 ==
- Males
  1. David
  2. Michael
  3. John
  4. James
  5. Robert
  6. Mark
  7. William
  8. Richard
  9. Thomas
  10. Kenneth; Steven (tie)
- Females
  1. Mary
  2. Lisa
  3. Susan
  4. Maria
  5. Karen
  6. Linda
  7. Patricia
  8. Donna
  9. Sandra
  10. Brenda

== 1962 ==
- Males
  1. Michael
  2. John
  3. David
  4. Robert
  5. James
  6. Mark
  7. William
  8. Richard
  9. Thomas
  10. Jeffrey
- Females
  1. Lisa
  2. Mary
  3. Maria
  4. Karen
  5. Susan
  6. Linda
  7. Patricia
  8. Donna
  9. Cynthia
  10. Debra

== 1963 ==
- Males
  1. David
  2. John; Michael (tie)
  3. ——
  4. James
  5. Robert
  6. Mark
  7. Richard; William (tie)
  8. ——
  9. Thomas
  10. Kevin
- Females
  1. Lisa
  2. Mary
  3. Maria
  4. Susan
  5. Karen
  6. Patricia
  7. Linda
  8. Donna
  9. Sandra
  10. Deborah

== 1964 ==
- Males
  1. Michael
  2. John
  3. David
  4. Robert
  5. James
  6. Mark
  7. William
  8. Richard
  9. Thomas
  10. Joseph
- Females
  1. Lisa
  2. Mary
  3. Maria
  4. Susan
  5. Karen
  6. Patricia
  7. Donna
  8. Linda
  9. Kimberly
  10. Elizabeth

== 1965 ==
- Males
  1. Michael
  2. James
  3. John
  4. David
  5. Robert
  6. William
  7. Richard
  8. Mark
  9. Thomas
  10. Jeffrey
- Females
  1. Lisa
  2. Maria
  3. Karen
  4. Mary
  5. Kimberly
  6. Susan
  7. Patricia
  8. Cynthia
  9. Linda
  10. Donna

== 1966 ==
- Males
  1. Michael
  2. David
  3. John
  4. James
  5. Robert
  6. William
  7. Richard
  8. Mark
  9. Thomas
  10. Jeffrey
- Females
  1. Lisa
  2. Maria
  3. Mary
  4. Kimberly
  5. Michelle
  6. Patricia
  7. Susan
  8. Karen
  9. Sandra
  10. Deborah; Elizabeth (tie)

== 1967 ==
- Males
  1. Michael
  2. David
  3. James
  4. John
  5. Robert
  6. William
  7. Mark
  8. Richard
  9. Jeffrey
  10. Christopher
- Females
  1. Lisa
  2. Maria
  3. Kimberly
  4. Michelle
  5. Mary
  6. Karen
  7. Susan
  8. Angela
  9. Melissa
  10. Jennifer

== 1968 ==
- Males
  1. Michael
  2. David
  3. James
  4. John
  5. Robert
  6. William
  7. Mark
  8. Christopher
  9. Richard
  10. Brian
- Females
  1. Lisa
  2. Michelle
  3. Kimberly
  4. Maria
  5. Jennifer
  6. Melissa
  7. Tammy
  8. Angela
  9. Mary
  10. Susan

== 1969 ==
- Males
  1. Michael
  2. David
  3. John
  4. Robert
  5. James
  6. William
  7. Richard
  8. Christopher
  9. Mark
  10. Brian
- Females
  1. Lisa
  2. Jennifer
  3. Michelle
  4. Kimberly
  5. Maria
  6. Melissa
  7. Amy
  8. Mary
  9. Elizabeth
  10. Karen

== See also ==
- Popularity of birth names for females (United States)
