= Devora =

Devora may refer to:

- Devorà Ascarelli, 16th-century Italian poet, likely the first Jewish woman to have a book of her own work published, in 1601
- Devora Bakon (1951–1983), Israeli actress
- Devora Brown, co-owner of Fortune Records, an American independent record label
- Devora Nadworney (1895–1948), American operatic contralto singer
- Germán Dévora (born 1943), Spanish retired football player and manager

== See also ==
- Devra, a given name
- Deborah (disambiguation)
