= Debbie =

- Gender: Female

Origin
- Origin: Hebrew
- Meaning: bee

Other names
- Related names: Deb, Debs, Debra, Deborah, Debbi

Debbie (or Debby) is a feminine given name. It is often short for Debra or Deborah, which means "bee".

== People ==
- Debbie Allen, American actress, choreographer and film director
- Debbie Abrahams, British politician
- Debbie Amis Bell, American civil rights activist
- Debbie Armstrong, American athlete
- Debby Boone, American singer and author
- Debbie Brill, Canadian high jumper
- Debbie Cook, Californian politician, mayor of Huntington Beach, California
- Debbie Crosbie (born 1969/1970), British banker
- Debbie Deb, American singer
- Debbie Deere (born 1964), American politician
- Debbie DiFranco, American politician
- Debbie Fuller, Canadian diver
- Debbie Gibson, American singer, songwriter and actress
- Debbie Harry, lead singer from the band Blondie
- Debbie Lesko, American politician
- Debbie Marti, English high jumper
- Debbie Matenopoulos, American television personality and actress
- Debbie McGee, English television, radio and stage performer
- Debbie McLeod, Scottish field hockey player
- Debbie McWhinnie (born 1981), Scottish footballer
- Debbie Meyer, American swimmer
- Debbie Mucarsel-Powell, American politician
- Debbie Ngarewa-Packer, New Zealand politician
- Debbie O'Malley, American politician
- Debbie Reynolds, American actress (born Mary Frances Reynolds)
- Debbie Ryan, American basketball coach
- Debby Ryan, American actress
- Debby Susanto, Indonesian former badminton player
- Debbie Muir (born 1953), Canadian former synchronized swimmer and coach
- Debbie Stabenow, American legislator
- Debbie Turner, actor, Marta von Trapp in 'The Sound of Music'
- Debbye Turner, Miss America 1990
- Debbie Wasserman Schultz, American legislator
- Debbie Rowe, Michael Jackson's ex wife
- Debbie Yow, American college basketball player

== Fictional characters ==
- Debbie Bates, a character from the BBC soap opera EastEnders
- Debbie Benton, the eponymous lead in the film Debbie Does Dallas (portrayed by Bambi Woods) and various sequels and adaptations
- Debbie Dean (Hollyoaks) (portrayed by Jodi Albert), in the British soap opera Hollyoaks
- Debbie Dingle (portrayed by Charley Webb), in the British soap opera Emmerdale
- Debbie Downer (portrayed by Rachel Dratch), a recurring character on Saturday Night Live
- Debbie Edwards (portrayed by Natalie Wood and Lana Wood), in the film The Searchers
- Debbie Eagan, from the Netflix series GLOW
- Debbie Gallagher (portrayed by Rebecca Ryan), one of the lead characters in British and American television drama series Shameless (portrayed by Emma Kenney)
- Debbie Grayson, wife to Omni-Man in Invincible
- Debbie Jellinsky (portrayed by Joan Cusack), main antagonist in the film Addams Family Values
- Debbie Kang, a minor character in Randy Cunningham: 9th Grade Ninja
- Debbie Turnbull (voiced by Lorraine Pilkington), mother of protagonist Tommy Turnbull in the British-French animated series Robotboy
- Debbie Winslow, (portrayed by Judy Greer) in the 2010 film Marmaduke

== Animals ==
- Debby (polar bear), the world's oldest polar bear

== See also ==
- Deb (disambiguation)
- Debs (disambiguation)
- Debra (disambiguation)
- Deborah (disambiguation)
