= Charles (surname) =

Charles is a surname. Notable people with the surname include:

== Art and entertainment ==
- Craig Charles (born 1964), British actor and comedian
- Dave Charles (fl. from 1967), British drummer, recording engineer and record producer
- Don Charles (1933–2005), English ballad singer, record producer, and author
- Jeannette Charles (1927–2024), British actress, look-alike of Queen Elizabeth II
- Jennifer Charles (born 1968), American singer
- Josh Charles (born 1971), American actor
- Keith Charles (actor) (1934–2008), American theatre and television actor
- Larry Charles (born 1956), American film director
- Billy Ocean (born 1950, Leslie Sebastian Charles), American singer
- Max Charles (born 2003), American actor
- Nancy Linehan Charles (born 1942), American actress
- Nicola Charles (born 1969), English actress
- Ray Charles (1930–2004), American pianist and musician
- Ray Charles (1918–2015), American composer and conductor of The Ray Charles Singers
- RuPaul Andre Charles (born 1960), American drag queen and actor
- Sam Charles (1887–1949), American painter and pianist
- Tina Charles (born 1954), English singer
- Yinka Charles (born 1970), British musician, aka MC Reason, former member of 1990s band Love City Groove

== Law and administration ==
- David Charles (public servant) (born 1940s), Australian senior public servant and consultant
- P. S. M. Charles (fl. from 2019), Sri Lankan Tamil civil servant
- Sir William Charles (born 1948), British judge

== Military ==
- Edward Charles (RAF officer) (1919–1986), Canadian military aviator
- Havelock Charles (1858–1934), British military doctor
- James Thomas Walter Charles (1865–1928), British Mercantile Marine captain
- Ronald Charles (1875–1955), British Army officer

== Politics ==
- Arthur H. Charles (1911–1999), American politician from Maine
- Bob Charles (politician) (1936–2016), Australian politician (Liberal Party)
- David Charles (born 1948), Australian politician (Labor Party)
- Deborah Charles, Saint Kitts and Nevis politician
- Eugenia Charles (1919–2005), Prime Minister of Dominica (1980–1995)
- George Charles (1916–2004), Chief minister of St. Lucia (1960–1964)
- Joseph Charles (born 1944), American politician from New Jersey
- Justina Charles (fl. from 2004), Dominican politician
- Kenya Charles (fl. from 2025), Trinidad and Tobago politician
- Nick Charles (politician) (born 1982), American politician from Maryland
- Pierre Charles (1954–2004), Prime Minister of Dominica (2000–2004)

== Religion ==
- David Charles (hymn-writer) (1762–1834), Welsh hymn-writer
- David Charles (minister) (1812–1878), Welsh Methodist cleric
- E. Otis Charles (1926–2013), retired bishop of the Episcopal Diocese of Utah
- Robert Charles (scholar) (1855–1931), English biblical scholar
- Rodney Charles (born 1950), Trinidadian politician
- Sydney Anicetus Charles (1929–2018), Trinidadian bishop
- Thomas Charles (1755–1814), Welsh Calvinistic Methodist clergyman

== Science and academia ==
- David Charles (physician) (born 1964), neurologist
- David Charles (philosopher) (fl. from 1984), professor of philosophy at the University of Oxford
- Enid Charles (1894–1972), statistician and demographer
- Jacques Charles (1746–1823), French scientist describing the behaviour of an ideal gas.
- Vera Charles (1877–1954) American mycologist

== Sports ==
- Bob Charles (golfer) (born 1936), New Zealand golf player
- David Atiba Charles (born 1977), football player
- Stephen Charles (1858−1950), English cricketer
- Cyrille Charles (born 1977), Saint Lucian cricketer
- Daedra Charles (1968–2018), American basketball player
- David Atiba Charles (born 1977), Trinidadian football player
- Ed Charles (1933–2018), American baseball player
- Ezzard Charles (1921–1975), former world heavyweight boxing champion
- Gary Charles (born 1970), British football player
- Irvin Charles (born 1997), American football player
- Jamaal Charles (born 1986), American football player
- John Charles (English footballer) (fl. 1912–1924), English football player
- John Charles (1931–2004), Welsh footballer
- Johnson Charles (born 1989) Saint Lucian, West Indian cricketer
- Lorenzo Charles (1963–2011), American former college and professional basketball player
- Mel Charles (1935–2016), Welsh professional football player
- Ned Charles (born 1957), Mauritian football player
- Ron Charles (basketball) (1959–2024), American basketball player
- Rudy Charles (born 1977), American professional wrestling referee
- Saahdiq Charles (born 1999), American football player
- Stefan Charles (born 1988), American football player
- Tina Charles (born 1988), American basketball player

== Writing ==
- Emily Hawthorne (born Emily Thornton Charles) (1845–1895), American poet, journalist, suffragist, newspaper founder
- Glen Charles (born 1943), American screenwriter and television producer, working with his brother Les Charles
- Jos Charles (fl. from 2016), American poet
- KJ Charles (fl. from 2013), British historical romance novelist
- Les Charles (born 1948), American screenwriter and television producer, working with his brother Glen Charles
- Ron Charles (critic) (born 1962), American book critic

== Fictional characters ==
- Chuck Charles, in the film The Penguins of Madagascar
- Derek and Sharon Charles, the couple in the 2009 film Obsessed
- Keith Charles, in the American TV series Six Feet Under
- Nick and Nora Charles, in Dashiell Hammett's novel The Thin Man
- Peter Charles, aka PC Principal, in TV series South Park
- Peyton Charles, in TV series iZombie

== See also ==
- Charles, for the first name
