= Debs =

Debs might refer to:

Surname:

- Bandali Debs (born 1953), Australian convicted serial killer
- Barbara Knowles Debs (born 1931), American art historian and former president of Manhattanville College
- Ernest E. Debs (1904–2002), American politician
- Eugene V. Debs (1855–1926), American union leader and presidential candidate of the Socialist Party of America
- Felipe El Debs (born 1985), Brazilian chess Grandmaster
- Theodore Debs (1864-1945) American politician and younger brother of Eugene V. Debs

Given name:

- Debs Garms (1907–1984), American Major League Baseball player

Other uses:

- Debs, Minnesota, United States, a small town
- D.E.B.S. (2003 film), a short, independent film about a squad of heroines
- D.E.B.S. (2004 film), a feature-length film spawned by the short film
- Debs School, Colorado, United States, a one-room schoolhouse on the National Register of Historic Places
- Debs (ball), a formal ball for schools in Ireland

== See also ==
- Deb (disambiguation)
- Debes
- Debra (disambiguation)
- Debbie (disambiguation)
- Deborah (disambiguation)
