= Deaths in March 1983 =

The following is a list of notable deaths in March 1983.

Entries for each day are listed alphabetically by surname. A typical entry lists information in the following sequence:

- Name, age, country of citizenship at birth, subsequent country of citizenship (if applicable), reason for notability, cause of death (if known), and reference.

== March 1983 ==
=== 1 ===
- Arthur Koestler, 77, Austro-Hungarian-born novelist, memoirist, and journalist, associate of the propaganda organization Information Research Department (IRD) which funded and distributed much of his work, suicide by an overdose of the barbiturate Tuinal taken with alcohol.

=== 2 ===
- Fiorella Mari, 54, Brazilian-born Italian actress,

=== 3 ===
- Hergé, 75, Belgian comic strip artist and representative of the ligne claire drawing style, created the series The Adventures of Tintin, Quick & Flupke, and The Adventures of Jo, Zette and Jocko, died while hospitalised in intensive care, since he had suffered cardiac arrest in late February
- Peter Ivers, 36, American singer, songwriter, film composer, and television host, bludgeoned to death with a hammer

=== 6 ===
- Donald Maclean, 69, British diplomat and Soviet double agent, a member of the spy ring Cambridge Five, complications from pneumonia

=== 7 ===
- Robert Bray, 65, American actor
- Igor Markevitch, 60, Russian composer and conductor

=== 8 ===
- William Walton, 80, English composer

=== 9 ===
- Faye Emerson, 65, American actress and talk show host, stomach cancer
- Rex Marshall, 64, American actor, television announcer, and radio personality, spokesman for the Reynolds Aluminum Company and the Maxwell House coffee brand

=== 11 ===
- Will Glickman, 73, American playwright

=== 15 ===
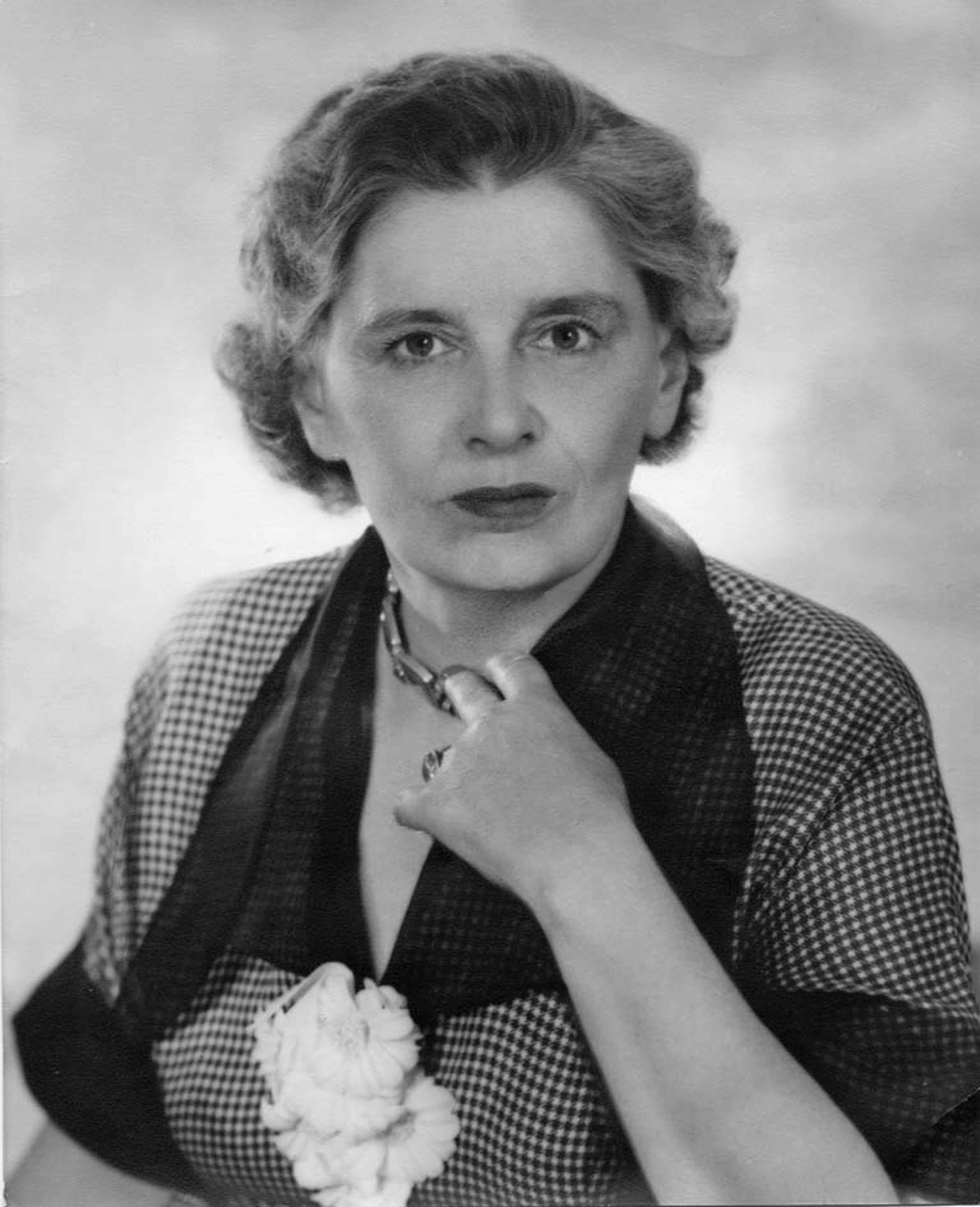
Dame Rebecca West

- Rebecca West, 90, British novelist, travel writer, literary critic, and journalist

=== 16 ===
- Arthur Godfrey, 79, American radio and television broadcaster and entertainer, spokesman for the anti-tobacco movement, emphysema

=== 17 ===
- Haldan Keffer Hartline, 80, American physiologist, primarily known for his work in analyzing the neurophysiological mechanisms of vision.

=== 18 ===
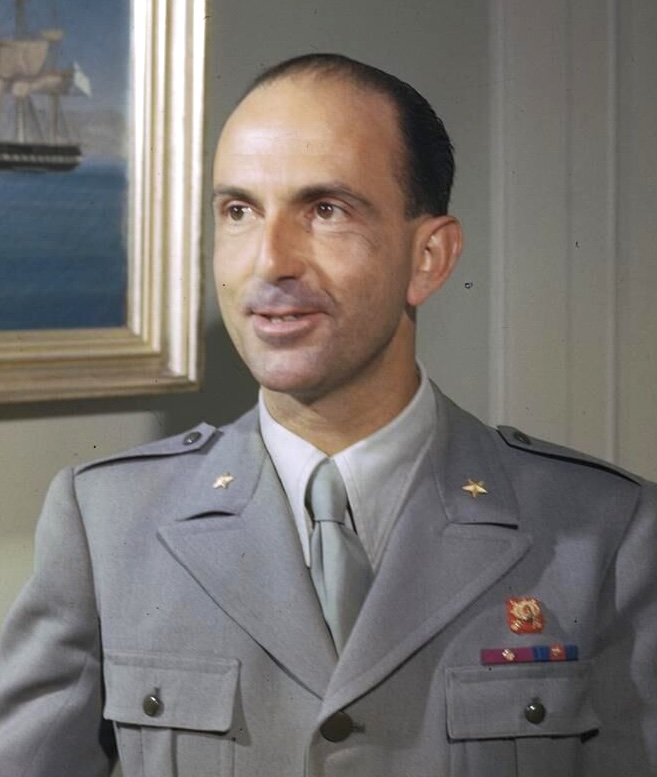
Umberto II of Italy

- Devora Bakon, 32, Israeli actress, traffic collision.
- Adelaide Klein, 82, American actress, brain tumor
- Catherine Marshall, 68, American writer and book editor, she had started her career with a biography of her deceased husband Peter Marshall,heart failure
- Umberto II of Italy, 78, he briefly served as the King of Italy in 1946 and was the last monarch of the country, he died in exile

=== 20 ===
- Maria Babanova, 82, Russian actress, regarded as the first great actress to emerge after the October Revolution, she both voiced the Snow Queen in the animated fantasy film The Snow Queen (1957), and she was used as the character's live-action model in the rotoscoping process
- Ivan Vinogradov, 91, Soviet mathematician, one of the creators of the modern analytic number theory, he served as the director of the Steklov Institute of Mathematics from 1934 until 1941, and again from 1946 until his death, he was regarded as an informal leader among the Soviet mathematicians

=== 23 ===
- Serge de Poligny, 79, French film director and screenwriter

=== 25 ===
- Martha Sleeper, 72, American actress, heart attack
- Bob Waterfield, 62, American professional football player and coach, actor, and film producer, co-founder of the production company Russ-Field Productions, respiratory failure

=== 26 ===
- Anthony Blunt, 75, British art historian and Soviet spy, member of the spy ring known as the Cambridge Five,

=== 27 ===
- Elsie Eaves, 84, American engineer, she was the first female associate member of the American Society of Civil Engineers (ASCE), and the first female member of the American Association of Cost Engineers (still extant under the name Association for the Advancement of Cost Engineering)
- James Hayter, 75, British actor.

=== 28 ===
- Suzanne Belperron, 82, French jewellery designer, head of the jewellery house Herz-Belperron, accidental death by scalding in her bath

=== 29 ===
- Richard O'Brien, 65, American actor, cancer

=== 30 ===
- Lisette Model, 81, Austrian-born American photographer, primarily known for her street photography, heart and respiratory disease

=== 31 ===
- Ole Aavatsmark, 65, Norwegian politician and lawyer, County Governor of Nordland county from 1966 until his death in office

== Sources ==
- Assouline, Pierre (2009). Hergé, the Man Who Created Tintin. Oxford and New York: Oxford University Press. ISBN 978-0-19-539759-8.
- Cesarani, David, 1998. Arthur Koestler: The Homeless Mind. ISBN 978-0-684-86720-5.
- Frank, Josh; Buckholtz, Charlie (2008). In Heaven Everything Is Fine: The Unsolved Life of Peter Ivers and the Lost History of New Wave Theatre. Simon & Schuster. ISBN 978-1-4165-5120-1.
- Kennedy, Michael (1989). Portrait of Walton. Oxford: Oxford University Press. ISBN 978-0-19-816705-1.
- GM Arthur Koestler: The Story of a Friendship (George Mikes)
- Mack Smith, Denis (1992). Italy and Its Monarchy. Yale University Press. ISBN 978-0300051322.
- Peeters, Benoît (2012) [2002]. Hergé: Son of Tintin. Tina A. Kover (translator). Baltimore, Maryland: Johns Hopkins University Press. ISBN 978-1-4214-0454-7.
- Possémé, Evelyne; Mouillefarine, Laurence (March 18, 2009). Bijoux Art déco et avant-garde (in French). Coédition Éditions Norma / Les Arts Décoratifs. p. 256. ISBN 978-2-9155-4220-2.
- Raulet, Sylvie; Baroin, Olivier (December 16, 2011). Suzanne Belperron. Antique Collectors Club. p. 351. ISBN 978-1-85149-625-9.
- Thompson, Harry (1991). Tintin: Hergé and his Creation. London: Hodder and Stoughton. ISBN 978-0-340-52393-3.
