= Deborah Davies =

Deborah Davies may refer to:

- Deborah Kay Davies, Welsh author
- Debbie Davies, guitarist
- Deborah Davies, television personality and former cast member on The Real Housewives of Cheshire

== See also ==
- Deborah Davis (disambiguation)
