= Tina Charles =

Tina Charles may refer to:

- Tina Charles (singer) (born 1954), English singer
- Tina Charles (basketball) (born 1988), American basketball player

== See also ==
- Charles (surname)
