= Richard Charles =

Richard Charles may refer to:

- Sir Richard Charles, 1st Baronet
- Dick Charles
- Ricky Charles

== See also ==
- Charles (surname)
