= Cherrill =

- Language: English

Origin
- Region of origin: England

Other names
- Variant forms: Cherill, Charles

Cherrill is an English surname. It is either habitational, referring to Cherhill, Wiltshire, England, or occupational, referring to 'churl', 'bonded tenant', 'serf', or 'peasant' (Middle English: cherl, cheril, charl, chirl). Notable people with the surname include:

- David Cherrill, American television writer and director
- Virginia Cherrill, American film actress
