= Arthur Charles =

Arthur Charles may refer to:

- Sir Arthur Charles (judge) (1839–1921), English High Court judge
- Sir Arthur Eber Sydney Charles (1910–1965), speaker of the Legislative Council of Aden, see Assassination of Sir Arthur Charles
- Arthur H. Charles (1911–1999), American politician from Maine
