= Debbi =

Debbi is a female personal name, a variant of Debbie. It may also be a short form of other names, such as Deborah.

It may refer to:

- Dvora Debbi Besserglick (1955–2005), Israeli actress and voice actress
- Debbi Fields (born 1956), American entrepreneur who founded Mrs. Fields Bakeries
- Debbi Michiko Florence (born 1964 or 1965), American children's writer
- Debbi Kostelyk (born 1961), Canadian Paralympic athlete
- Deborah Debbi Lawrence (born 1961), American racewalker
- Deborah Debbi Morgan (born 1951 or 1956, American actress
- Debbi Peterson, member of the Bangles 1980s all-female pop band
- Debbi Taylor, American sports reporter
- Debbi Wilkes (born 1946), Canadian pair skater
- Debbi (singer), stage name of Czech-German singer Deborah Kahl (born 1993)
- the protagonist of Date with Debbi, a DC Comics comic book series published between 1969 and 1972

== See also ==
- Debi (disambiguation)
- Debbie (disambiguation)
