= Evenson =

Evenson is a surname. Notable people with the surname include:

- Alexander Evenson (1892–1919), Russian chess master
- Brian Evenson (born 1966), American academic and writer of both literary fiction and popular fiction
- Clarence I. Evenson (1890 –1981), American politician from Minnesota
- Dean Evenson (born 1944), New Age musician and producer
- Debra Evenson (1942–2011), American legal expert, practicing lawyer, and educator
- Donald Evenson (1940–2025), American biologist and chemist
- Jim Evenson (1947–2008), running back who played seven seasons in the Canadian Football League
- Tom Evenson (1910–1997), English athlete who competed for Great Britain in the 1932 and 1936 Summer Olympics
