= List of the most popular names in the 1900s in the United States =

These are the most popular given names in the United States for all years of the 1900s (decade).

== 1900 ==
- Males
  1. John
  2. William
  3. James
  4. George
  5. Charles
  6. Joseph
  7. Frank
  8. Henry
  9. Robert
  10. Harry
- Females
  1. Mary
  2. Helen
  3. Anna
  4. Margaret
  5. Ruth
  6. Elizabeth
  7. Marie
  8. Rose
  9. Florence
  10. Bertha

== 1901 ==
- Males
  1. John
  2. William
  3. James
  4. Joseph
  5. George
  6. Charles
  7. Frank
  8. Henry
  9. Robert
  10. Edward
- Females
  1. Mary
  2. Helen
  3. Anna
  4. Margaret
  5. Elizabeth
  6. Ruth
  7. Marie
  8. Gladys
  9. Florence
  10. Rose

== 1902 ==
- Males
  1. John
  2. William
  3. James
  4. George
  5. Joseph
  6. Charles
  7. Robert
  8. Frank
  9. Edward
  10. Walter
- Females
  1. Mary
  2. Helen
  3. Anna
  4. Margaret
  5. Ruth
  6. Elizabeth
  7. Marie
  8. Lillian
  9. Florence
  10. Alice; Rose (tie)

== 1903 ==
- Males
  1. John
  2. William
  3. James
  4. George
  5. Joseph
  6. Charles
  7. Robert
  8. Frank
  9. Walter
  10. Henry
- Females
  1. Mary
  2. Margaret
  3. Helen
  4. Anna
  5. Ruth
  6. Marie
  7. Elizabeth
  8. Florence
  9. Dorothy
  10. Lillian

== 1904 ==
- Males
  1. John
  2. William
  3. George; James (tie)
  4. Joseph
  5. Charles
  6. Robert
  7. Frank
  8. Edward
  9. Walter
  10. Charlie
- Females
  1. Mary
  2. Helen
  3. Margaret
  4. Ruth
  5. Anna
  6. Dorothy; Elizabeth (tie)
  7. Marie
  8. Alice; Florence (tie)
  9. -----
  10. -----

== 1905 ==
- Males
  1. John
  2. William
  3. James
  4. George
  5. Charles
  6. Joseph
  7. Frank; Robert (tie)
  8. Edward
  9. Thomas
  10. -----
- Females
  1. Mary
  2. Helen
  3. Margaret
  4. Anna
  5. Ruth
  6. Dorothy
  7. Elizabeth
  8. Mildred
  9. Lillian
  10. Marie

== 1906 ==
- Males
  1. John
  2. William
  3. James
  4. Joseph
  5. George
  6. Charles
  7. Robert
  8. Frank
  9. Henry
  10. Edward
- Females
  1. Mary
  2. Helen
  3. Margaret
  4. Ruth
  5. Anna
  6. Elizabeth
  7. Dorothy
  8. Marie
  9. Alice
  10. Florence

== 1907 ==
- Males
  1. John
  2. William
  3. James
  4. George
  5. Charles
  6. Joseph
  7. Robert
  8. Frank
  9. Thomas; Walter (tie)
  10. -----
- Females
  1. Mary
  2. Helen
  3. Margaret
  4. Anna
  5. Ruth
  6. Dorothy
  7. Elizabeth
  8. Mildred
  9. Alice
  10. Ethel

== 1908 ==
- Males
  1. John
  2. William
  3. James
  4. George
  5. Joseph
  6. Charles
  7. Robert
  8. Frank
  9. Edward
  10. Henry
- Females
  1. Mary
  2. Helen
  3. Margaret
  4. Anna
  5. Ruth
  6. Dorothy
  7. Elizabeth
  8. Mildred
  9. Frances
  10. Florence

== 1909 ==
- Males
  1. John
  2. William
  3. James
  4. George
  5. Joseph
  6. Robert
  7. Charles
  8. Frank
  9. Edward
  10. Henry; Walter (tie)
- Females
  1. Mary
  2. Helen
  3. Margaret
  4. Ruth; Dorothy (tie)
  5. Anna
  6. Elizabeth
  7. Mildred
  8. Marie
  9. Alice
  10. -----

== See also ==
- Popularity of birth names for females (United States)
