= List of the most popular names in the 1930s in the United States =

These are the most popular given names in the United States for all years of the 1930s.

== 1930 ==
- Males
  1. Witt
  2. James
  3. John
  4. William
  5. Richard
  6. Charles
  7. Donald
  8. George
  9. Joseph
  10. Edward
- Females
  1. Mary
  2. Betty
  3. Dorothy
  4. Helen
  5. Barbara
  6. Margaret
  7. Maria
  8. Patricia
  9. Doris
  10. Joan; Ruth (tie)

== 1931 ==
- Males
  1. Robert
  2. James
  3. John
  4. William
  5. Richard
  6. Charles
  7. Donald
  8. George
  9. Joseph
  10. Thomas
- Females
  1. Mary
  2. Betty
  3. Dorothy
  4. Barbara
  5. Joan
  6. Helen
  7. Maria
  8. Patricia
  9. Margaret

== 1932 ==
- Males
  1. Robert
  2. John
  3. James
  4. William
  5. Charles
  6. Richard
  7. Donald
  8. George
  9. Joseph
  10. Thomas
- Females
  1. Mary
  2. Betty
  3. Barbara
  4. Dorothy
  5. Joan
  6. Patricia
  7. Shirley
  8. Margaret
  9. Doris
  10. Helen

== 1933 ==
- Males
  1. Robert
  2. James
  3. John
  4. William
  5. Richard
  6. Donald
  7. Charles
  8. Joseph
  9. George
  10. Thomas
- Females
  1. Mary
  2. Betty
  3. Barbara
  4. Dorothy
  5. Joan
  6. Patricia
  7. Maria
  8. Helen
  9. Margaret
  10. Doris

== 1934 ==
- Males
  1. Robert
  2. James
  3. John
  4. William
  5. Richard
  6. Charles
  7. Donald
  8. George
  9. Thomas
  10. Joseph
- Females
  1. Mary
  2. Betty
  3. Shirley
  4. Barbara
  5. Joan
  6. Patricia
  7. Dorothy
  8. Maria
  9. Margaret
  10. Helen

== 1935 ==
- Males
  1. James
  2. Robert
  3. John
  4. William
  5. Richard
  6. Charles
  7. Donald
  8. Thomas
  9. Ronald
  10. David
- Females
  1. Mary
  2. Shirley
  3. Barbara
  4. Betty
  5. Patricia
  6. Joan
  7. Dorothy
  8. Margaret
  9. Maria
  10. Helen

== 1936 ==
- Males
  1. Robert
  2. James
  3. John
  4. William
  5. Donald
  6. Richard
  7. Charles
  8. Ronald
  9. George
  10. Joseph
- Females
  1. Mary
  2. Shirley
  3. Barbara
  4. Betty
  5. Patricia
  6. Maria
  7. Dorothy; Nancy (tie)
  8. Joan
  9. Margaret
  10. -----

== 1937 ==
- Males
  1. Robert
  2. James
  3. John
  4. William
  5. Richard
  6. Donald
  7. Charles
  8. David
  9. George
  10. Thomas
- Females
  1. Mary
  2. Barbara
  3. Patricia
  4. Shirley
  5. Betty
  6. Maria; Nancy (tie)
  7. Dorothy
  8. Carol
  9. Margaret
  10. -----

== 1938 ==
- Males
  1. Robert
  2. James
  3. John
  4. William
  5. Richard
  6. Charles
  7. Donald
  8. David
  9. George
  10. Ronald; Thomas (tie)
- Females
  1. Mary
  2. Barbara
  3. Patricia
  4. Betty
  5. Shirley
  6. Nancy
  7. Carol; Maria
  8. Margaret
  9. Joan
  10. -----

== 1939 ==
- Males
  1. Robert
  2. James
  3. John
  4. William
  5. Richard
  6. Charles
  7. David
  8. Thomas
  9. Donald
  10. Ronald
- Females
  1. Mary
  2. Barbara
  3. Patricia
  4. Betty
  5. Shirley
  6. Maria
  7. Margaret
  8. Carol
  9. Nancy
  10. Judith

== See also ==
- Popularity of birth names for females (United States)
