= Senator Charles =

Senator Charles may refer to:

- Arthur H. Charles (1911–1999), Maine State Senate
- Joseph Charles (born 1944), New Jersey State Senate
- Nick Charles (politician) (born 1982), Maryland State Senate
