= List of the most popular names in the 1940s in the United States =

These are the most popular given names in the United States for all years of the 1940s.

== 1940 ==
- Males
  1. James
  2. Robert
  3. John
  4. William
  5. Richard
  6. Charles
  7. David
  8. Thomas
  9. Donald
  10. Ronald
- Females
  1. Mary
  2. Barbara
  3. Patricia
  4. Carol
  5. Judith
  6. Betty
  7. Nancy
  8. Maria
  9. Margaret
  10. Linda

== 1941 ==
- Males
  1. Robert
  2. John
  3. James
  4. William
  5. Richard
  6. Charles
  7. David
  8. Thomas
  9. Ronald
  10. Donald
- Females
  1. Mary
  2. Barbara
  3. Patricia
  4. Carol
  5. Linda
  6. Judith
  7. Sandra
  8. Maria
  9. Betty
  10. Nancy

== 1942 ==
- Males
  1. James
  2. Robert
  3. John
  4. William
  5. Richard
  6. Charles
  7. David
  8. Thomas
  9. Ronald
  10. Joseph
- Females
  1. Mary
  2. Barbara
  3. Patricia
  4. Carol
  5. Linda
  6. Nancy
  7. Betty
  8. Sandra
  9. Maria
  10. Judith

== 1943 ==
- Males
  1. James
  2. Robert
  3. John
  4. William
  5. Richard
  6. David
  7. Charles
  8. Thomas
  9. Ronald
  10. Michael
- Females
  1. Mary
  2. Barbara
  3. Patricia
  4. Linda
  5. Carol
  6. Sandra
  7. Nancy; Sharon (tie)
  8. Judith
  9. Betty
  10. -----

== 1944 ==
- Males
  1. Robert
  2. James
  3. John
  4. William
  5. Richard
  6. David
  7. Charles
  8. Thomas
  9. Michael
  10. Ronald
- Females
  1. Mary
  2. Barbara
  3. Patricia
  4. Linda
  5. Carol
  6. Nancy
  7. Sandra
  8. Sharon
  9. Judith
  10. Maria

== 1945 ==
- Males
  1. James
  2. Robert
  3. John
  4. William
  5. Richard
  6. David
  7. Thomas
  8. Charles
  9. Michael
  10. Ronald
- Females
  1. Mary
  2. Linda
  3. Barbara
  4. Patricia
  5. Carol
  6. Maria
  7. Sandra
  8. Nancy
  9. Sharon
  10. Susan

== 1946 ==
- Males
  1. James
  2. Robert
  3. John
  4. William
  5. Richard
  6. David
  7. Michael
  8. Charles
  9. Thomas
  10. Ronald
- Females
  1. Mary
  2. Linda
  3. Patricia
  4. Barbara
  5. Carol
  6. Susan
  7. Nancy
  8. Sandra
  9. Maria
  10. Sharon

== 1947 ==
- Males
  1. James
  2. John
  3. Robert
  4. William
  5. Richard
  6. David
  7. Michael
  8. Thomas
  9. Charles
  10. Larry
- Females
  1. Linda
  2. Mary
  3. Patricia
  4. Barbara
  5. Sandra
  6. Susan
  7. Maria
  8. Carol
  9. Nancy
  10. Sharon

== 1948 ==
- Males
  1. Robert
  2. James
  3. John
  4. William
  5. David
  6. Richard
  7. Michael
  8. Thomas
  9. Charles
  10. Ronald
- Females
  1. Linda
  2. Mary
  3. Patricia
  4. Barbara
  5. Susan
  6. Maria
  7. Carol
  8. Nancy; Sandra (tie)
  9. Sharon
  10. -----

== 1949 ==
- Males
  1. James
  2. Robert
  3. John
  4. David; William (tie)
  5. Michael
  6. Richard
  7. Thomas
  8. Charles
  9. Larry
  10. -----
- Females
  1. Linda
  2. Mary
  3. Patricia
  4. Barbara
  5. Susan
  6. Sandra
  7. Maria
  8. Nancy
  9. Carol
  10. Sharon

== See also ==
- Popularity of birth names for females (United States)
