= Deb (given name) =

- Gender: Mainly women

Deb is a unisex given name. As a feminine name, it is often a shortened version (hypocorism) of Deborah or Debra.

People named Deb include:

== Women ==
- Deb Adair (born 1966), American audio engineer awarded three Emmys for sound mixing
- Deb Baker (born 1953), American mystery writer
- Deb Conroy, member of the Illinois House of Representatives since 2013
- Deb Covey (born 1961), Canadian former field hockey player
- Deb Fischer (born 1951), American politician, senior United States Senator from Nebraska
- Deb Foskey (1949–2020), Australian former politician
- Deb Frecklington (born 1971), Australian politician
- Deb Gilbertson, New Zealand entrepreneurship academic and educational consultant
- Deb Goldberg (born 1954), American politician, businesswoman and lawyer, Treasurer of Massachusetts
- Deb Haaland (born 1960), American politician, former United States Secretary of the Interior
- Deb Hobson, American politician elected in 2022
- Deb Hutton, Canadian politician, former chief of staff to Premier Mike Harris
- Deb Kiel (born 1957), American politician
- Deb Lacusta, American television writer and actress, wife of voice actor Dan Castellaneta
- Deb Manjarrez, American politician
- Deb Matthews (born c. 1953), Canadian politician
- Deb Mell (born 1968), American politician
- Deb Placey (born 1966), news anchor/reporter for the National Hockey League New Jersey Devils' televised games
- Deb Rey (born 1967), American politician
- Deb Richard (born 1963), American former golfer
- Deb Schulte (born c. 1960), Canadian Member of Parliament
- Deb Shaughnessy (born 1960), American politician
- Deb Soholt, member of the South Dakota Senate since 2013
- Deb Sokolow (born 1974), American visual artist
- Deb Olin Unferth (born 1968), American author
- Deb Vanasse (born 1957), Alaskan writer
- Deb Whitten (born 1966), Canadian former field hockey goalkeeper
- Deb Willet (1650–1678), a young maid employed by Samuel Pepys, with whom she had a liaison

== Men ==
- Deb Mukherjee (1941–2025), Indian Bengali actor
- Deb Roy, Canadian professor at MIT and Chief Media Scientist of Twitter
- Deb Smith, American basketball player
- Deb Shankar Ray, Indian physical chemist and professor
