= Devra =

Devra is a feminine given name, related to Deborah. It may refer to:

- Devra Davis (born 1946), American epidemiologist, toxicologist and author
- Devra Hoff, American bassist, composer, and arranger
- Devra G. Kleiman (1942–2010), American biologist
- Devra Frost, a ring name, along with Epiphany, for American retired professional wrestler Devorah Simone Frost (born 1981)

== See also ==
- Devora
