= Debi (disambiguation) =

Debi is a given name and a surname.

Debi may also refer to:

- Debi (2005 film), an Indian film
- Debi (novel), a 1985 novel by Humayun Ahmed
- Debi (2018 film), a Bangladeshi supernatural thriller film, based on the novel

== See also ==
- Debbie
- Devi (disambiguation)
