= Debes =

Debes is a surname which may refer to:

- Ernst Debes (1840–1923), German cartographer
- Hans Jákupsson Debes (1723–1769), Prime Minister of the Faroe Islands from 1752 to 1769
- Inge Debes (1882–1945), Norwegian jurist, editor and politician
- Jens Peter Debes (1776–1832), Norwegian judge and politician
- Lothar Debes (1890-1960), German officer in both world wars
- Lucas Debes (1623-1675), Danish priest, topographer and writer
- Peter Olaf Debes (1845–1914), Norwegian politician
- Thierry Debès (born 1974), French retired football goalkeeper
