= Devorah =

Devorah is a feminine given name, a variant of Deborah. It may refer to:

- Devorah Baron (1887–1956), a pioneering Jewish writer
- Devorah Baum, British academic, author and filmmaker
- Devorah Bertonov (1915–2010), Israeli dancer, choreographer and actress
- Devorah Blachor, American writer, journalist, humorist and essayist
- Devorah Frost (born 1981), American retired professional wrestler, ring name Epiphany
- Devorah Halberstam, American political activist
- Devorah Major American writer, poet, performer, essayist, editor, recording artist and professor
- Devorah Rose, American magazine editor, television personality and entrepreneur
- Devorah Sperber, American installation artist

== See also ==
- Devra, another given name
- Dvora (disambiguation), including a list of people with the given name
