= Josh Appignanesi =

British film director, producer and screenwriter

Josh Appignanesi (born 1975) is a British film director, producer, and screenwriter. Appignanesi is best known for the feature film Song of Songs (2006), starring Natalie Press, which he directed, co-wrote and co-produced. The film won several awards including a special commendation for Best British Film at the Edinburgh Film Festival. Made on a tiny budget, the film is a dark study of the intense relationship between a brother and highly religious sister in London's Orthodox Jewish community. The film had a small, arthouse UK release but received critical acclaim; The Observer said it "reveals a distinctive and bold new voice in British cinema." He has written and directed several short films, most notably Ex Memoria (2006) which also stars Natalie Press as well as Sara Kestelman in a study of a woman with Alzheimer's disease, funded by the Wellcome Trust; and Nine 1/2 Minutes (2003), a romantic comedy starring David Tennant.

== Life and career ==
In 2006, Appignanesi directed his first feature film, Song of Songs.

In 2010, he directed and script edited the comedy feature film The Infidel, written by David Baddiel, and starring Omid Djalili, Richard Schiff, Archie Panjabi, Amit Shah and Yigal Naor. Produced by Arvind David at Slingshot, the film follows the adventures of a British Muslim everyman (Djalili) who discovers he was born Jewish. The film was released internationally in Spring 2010, and in the UK with distributor Revolver Entertainment.

He lives in London and studied anthropology at King's College, Cambridge, where he was a contemporary and close friend of the novelist Zadie Smith. Appignanesi is married to academic Devorah Baum. The couple have two sons together. Appignanesi co-directed 2016 documentary film The New Man with Baum about their experience as expectant parents. The film was described in The Observer as "a profoundly moving and revealing study of a life-changing event."

In 2023, he and Baum produced and directed Husband, a documentary about their marriage through the lens of a trip to New York City for Baum's book launch. In a positive review, The Guardian called it "a complex, subtle kind of guided reality show, like Made in Chelsea with a hint of Curb Your Enthusiasm."

Appignanesi describes his mid‑2023 film My Extinction and the accompanying personal journey to climate activism in The Guardian.

He is the son of writers Lisa and Richard Appignanesi and brother of Katrina Forrester.

== Sources ==
- bbc.co.uk
- guardian.co.uk
- bbc.co.uk
- https://web.archive.org/web/20070928014243/http://www.britfilms.com/britishfilms/catalogue/browse/?id=D9CD54E207b762D510gUyPBC621F
