= My Extinction =

- Directed by: Josh Appignanesi
- Starring: AL Kennedy; George Monbiot; Susie Orbach; Mark Rylance; Simon Schama; Ali Smith; Zadie Smith; Juliet Stevenson
- Production company: Dartmouth Films
- Release date: 2023
- Running time: 80 min
- Country: United Kingdom
- Language: English

My Extinction is a 2023 documentary film directed by Josh Appignanesi. It tells of his personal journey to climate activism and his involvement with the campaign group Extinction Rebellion.
