= Debrah =

- Gender: Female
- Language(s): English

Origin
- Word/name: Hebrew
- Meaning: bee

Debrah is a surname and a feminine given name.

Debrah is a Hebrew name meaning "bee". It is a feminine name that is often associated with the biblical figure Deborah, who was a prophetess and judge in the Old Testament. The name is also associated with the Hebrew word for "bee", which is "deborah".

It may refer to:

- Ameyaw Debrah, Ghanaian blogger and freelance journalist
- Ernest Debrah (1947–2016), Ghanaian politician
- Julius Debrah (born 1966?), Ghanaian politician
- Debrah Farentino (born 1959), American actress, producer and journalist
- Debrah Scarlett, stage name of Norwegian-Swiss singer and songwriter Joanna Deborah Bussinger (born 1993)

== See also ==
- Mercy Yvonne Debrah-Karikari, Ghanaian diplomat
- Debra
