= Dvorah Rabinowitz Masovetsky =

Zionist leader

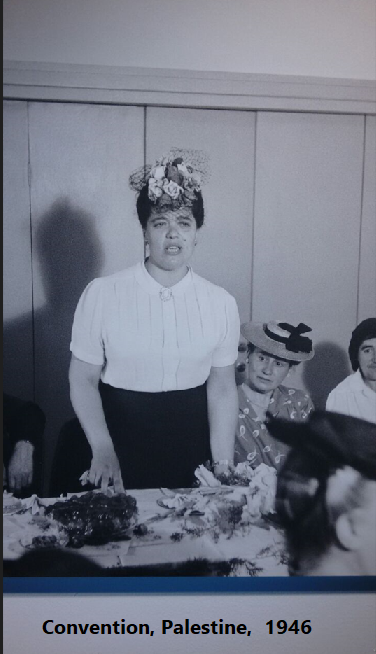
- Dvorah Rabinowitz Masovetsky - Palestine 1946
- Born: 1 December 1907; Bobruisk, Russian Empire
- Died: 28 August 2005 (aged 97); Jerusalem, Israel
- Occupation: Zionist leader
- Spouse(s): Rabbi Simcha Rabinowitz; Cantor Leon Masovetsky.
- Children: 3
- Parent(s): Freda (Frada) Wolfson, Hyman Chaim Itschak Resnikoff
- Family: Resnikoff

Dvorah Rabinowitz Masovetsky (1 December 1907 – 28 August 2005) was a Zionist leader who served as president of Mizrachi Women's Organization of America from 1949 until 1951. Rabinowitz Masovetsky helped establish and oversee several youth villages and resident schools in Israel, among them, Mossad Tel Ra’anan, Mossad Aliya, and Beit Tze’irot Mizrachi, designed to welcome the influx of orphans arriving in the wake of World War II.

== Biography ==
Dvorah Rabinowitz Masovetsky was the fourth of ten children to Hyman and Frieda (Wolfson) Resnikoff. She was born in Bobruisk, Russia, and arrived at Ellis Island in 1907 at the age of 9 months. The family settled on the Lower East Side of Manhattan, and eventually moved to Brooklyn, New York. They were religious Jews who also were deeply committed to Zionism. Dvorah's mother was a friend of Bessie Gotsfeld, and helped her as she founded the Mizrachi Women's Organization, later to become AMIT Women. Dvorah, an ardent Zionist herself, traveled to Palestine, via Egypt, in 1929 as a single young woman - a most unusual thing for a religious unmarried female to do in those days. When she returned, she married Rabbi Simcha Rabinowitz in 1931 and settled in New York, where she worked as a full-time volunteer for the Zionist cause, while raising 3 children.

Although the women's organization had implemented their own programs for many years, they participated in the Mizrachi Movement (Religious Zionists) only as an auxiliary arm to the male leadership that controlled funds, resources, and decision making. It was only after one of Dvorah's impassioned speeches at a Mizrachi convention in the mid-1930s, that a vote was taken to declare the Women's organization an independent entity. By 1939, the group had declared its complete autonomy from the men and became the largest religious Zionist organization in North America.

In 1945, Rabinowitz Masovetsky attended the First World Zionist Congress to take place after WWII, as a voting delegate together with Bessie Gotsfeld. She became well versed in the field of child care, religious education, and immigrant absorption, and met with international leaders to champion the cause for aid and support for programs, to help settle and rehabilitate the thousands of orphans who had flooded into Palestine after the war. At various times between 1946 and 1953, she accompanied the likes of Eleanor Roosevelt, US Senator Wayne Morse, several of Israel's Prime Ministers and Cabinet members, as well as a variety of dignitaries from all over the world, when they visited some of the youth villages and facilities that were sponsored by The Mizrachi Women's Organization (eventually AMIT Women).

In 1946, Dvorah Rabinowitz Masovetsky and her young family left the US and travel to Palestine, so that she and Rabbi Rabinowitz could survey and oversee childcare facilities and programs for these orphans. Her own children lived and studied with these child survivors, while both parents worked to help run the facilities and garner support from around the world. In 1947, their visas were not renewed by the British Mandatory Government in Palestine, and they had to leave the country. But after the State of Israel was established, they returned in 1949, and spent several years continuing the work they had begun earlier.

In 1953, they came back to the U.S., where Dvorah continued her Zionist work by traveling all over the US, Canada, and Europe, raising funds for these projects and broadcasting on WEVD radio, as well as Kol Yisrael La’Golah, in support of Israel and Amit Women. Rabinowitz Masovetsky succeeded to raise significant funds, strengthening existing Mizrachi Women chapters, and establishing new ones across the country.

In 1961 she and her husband made aliya and settled in Tel Aviv, where her daughter, son in law, and three sabra grandchildren lived. Over the years, she maintained close contact with several of the children who had lived at the facilities she supported, and with many of the world leaders she had met.

Leesha Rose, a member of the Dutch resistance, the author of The Tulips are Red, and a lecturer at Yad Vashem, said of Dvorah: “From the top statesmen she had known to the smallest children she helped save, it was the human side of their story and of Israel that she was concerned with and wrote about in her many articles, her monthly column called ‘Personally Yours,’ her broadcasts, as well as her book, Orchids in My Refrigerator.“

Her husband, Rabbi Simcha Rabinowitz, died in 1969. Dvorah remained in Tel Aviv until 1976, when she moved to Jerusalem and married Cantor Leon Masovetsky. Dvorah died in August 2005, at the age of 97.

== Publications ==
- Orchids in My Refrigerator, OTPAZ Publishing Co. Ltd, Tel Aviv, Israel, 1969
