= Dvora Yanow =

Political ethnographer and interpretive methodologist

- Awards: Herbert Simon Award (APSA)

Academic background
- Education: Massachusetts Institute of Technology (PhD), Harvard Graduate School of Education (EdM), Brandeis University (BA)

Academic work
- Discipline: methodology
- Institutions: Wageningen University, California State University, East Bay

Dvora Yanow is a political ethnographer interpretive methodologist and guest professor at Wageningen University. She is also a professor emerita at California State University, East Bay. She is a winner of the Herbert Simon Award (APSA) for the book Constructing "Race" and "Ethnicity" in America: Category-Making in Public Policy and Administration.

== Books ==
- How does a policy mean? Interpreting policy and organizational actions. Washington, DC: Georgetown University Press, 1996.
- Conducting interpretive policy analysis. Newbury Park, CA: Sage, 2000.
- Constructing "race" and "ethnicity" in America: Category-making in public policy and administration. Armonk, NY: M E Sharpe, 2003.
- Interpretive research design: Concepts and processes. New York: Routledge, 2012 (with Peregrine Schwartz-Shea).
- Knowing in organizations: A practice-based approach. Armonk, NY: M E Sharpe, 2003 (co-edited with Davide Nicolini and Silvia Gherardi).
- Interpretation and method: Empirical research methods and the interpretive turn. Armonk, NY: M E Sharpe, 2006; 2nd edition 2014 (co-edited with Peregrine Schwartz-Shea).
- Organizational ethnography: Studying the complexities of everyday life. London: Sage, 2009 (co-edited with Sierk Ybema, Harry Wels, Frans Kamsteeg).
- Organizational spaces: Rematerializing the workaday world. Cheltenham, UK: Edward Elgar, 2010 (co-edited with Alfons van Marrewijk).
- Organizational culture, 2 volumes. Cheltenham, UK: Edward Elgar, 2011 (co-edited with Sierk Ybema and Ida Sabelis).
