= Cyrille Charles =

Saint Lucian cricketer (born 1977)

Personal information
- Full name: Cyrille Charles
- Born: 15 February 1977 (age 49); Saint Lucia
- Batting: Right-handed
- Bowling: Right-arm medium-fast
- Role: All-rounder

Domestic team information
- Years: Team
- 2008: Saint Lucia
- Source: CricketArchive, May 11 2016

Cyrille Charles (born February 15, 1977 in St Lucia) is a former Saint Lucian cricketer who played for the Saint Lucia national cricket team in Stanford 20/20 in West Indian domestic cricket. He played as a right-handed batsman as well as right-arm medium-fast bowler.
