= Debra Weinstein =

- Born: 1961 (age 64–65)
- Occupations: poet and author

Debra Weinstein (born 1961) is a poet and the author of the novel Apprentice to the Flower Poet Z. (Random House, 2004). Her poems have appeared in The American Poetry Review, The National Review, Tikkun, and The Portable Lower East Side.

== Education ==
Weinstein earned a BA in English literature and creative writing from the State University of New York at Binghamton and an MA in English literature from the Graduate Creative Writing Program at New York University, where she was the recipient of a Galway Kinnell Fellowship.

== Recognition ==
Weinstein received New York University's Bobst Literary Award for Emerging Writers upon publication of her volume of poetry, Rodent Angel (NYU Press, 1996). She received a National Endowment for the Arts Creative Writing Fellowship for poetry and a New York State Foundation for the Arts (NYFA) Creative Writing Fellowship for Fiction. She has been in residence at both the MacDowell Colony and Yaddo.

Weinstein came to prominence as a poet in the 1990s, during the AIDS epidemic. She published her poems and stories in magazines and journals before the age of the Internet, and read her work at The Knitting Factory, CBGBs, and many other downtown venues. The poems in her first volume look back at a complex childhood in suburban Long Island toward a future where loss is mourned, love is celebrated, and a child is conceived from a union between two women. Her academic novel, Apprentice to the Flower Poet Z, takes an ironic, backward, fictional glance at a time when, after completing graduate school, she worked as an assistant to a dean at NYU's School of Education and assisted Sharon Olds as an administrator in the NYU Goldwater Creative Writing Program.

== Works ==
Some of her works include Apprentice to the Flower Poet Z, and Rodent Angel.

== Personal life ==
She lives in New York City and has two children.
