= Inge Debes =

Norwegian jurist, editor and politician

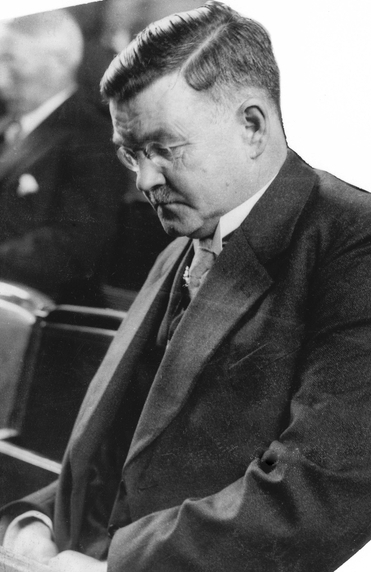
Inge Debes, c. 1940

Inge Thomas Dahl Debes (15 May 1882 – 25 November 1945) is a Norwegian jurist, editor and politician.

He was born in Kragerø and married to Sigrid Torgersen (1885–1936) from 1905 to 1913. They divorced and she later married Jakob Friis (1914 to 1924) and Emil Stang, Jr. (from 1925).

Debes edited the Norwegian Labour Party publication Det 20de Århundre in the early 1910s. He joined the Social Democratic Labour Party of Norway after the party split in 1921.

From 1925 he chaired the organization Norsk forening for sosialt arbeid. He was a judge in Oslo City Court from 1926, and published several books. In 1945 he chaired the commission that delivered a controversial document on "war children" to the Norwegian Ministry of Social Affairs, which was stopped by Sven Oftedal and never reached the Parliament of Norway for deliberation.
