= Debra Saylor =

American musician

Debra Saylor (born 1962 in Dubuque, Iowa) is an American pianist, classical singer and voice instructor. She came to prominence during the Van Cliburn International Piano Competition for amateurs in Fort Worth in 2000, where she finished third and was awarded Best Performance for the Romantic Era.
