= Debs School =

- U.S. National Register of Historic Places
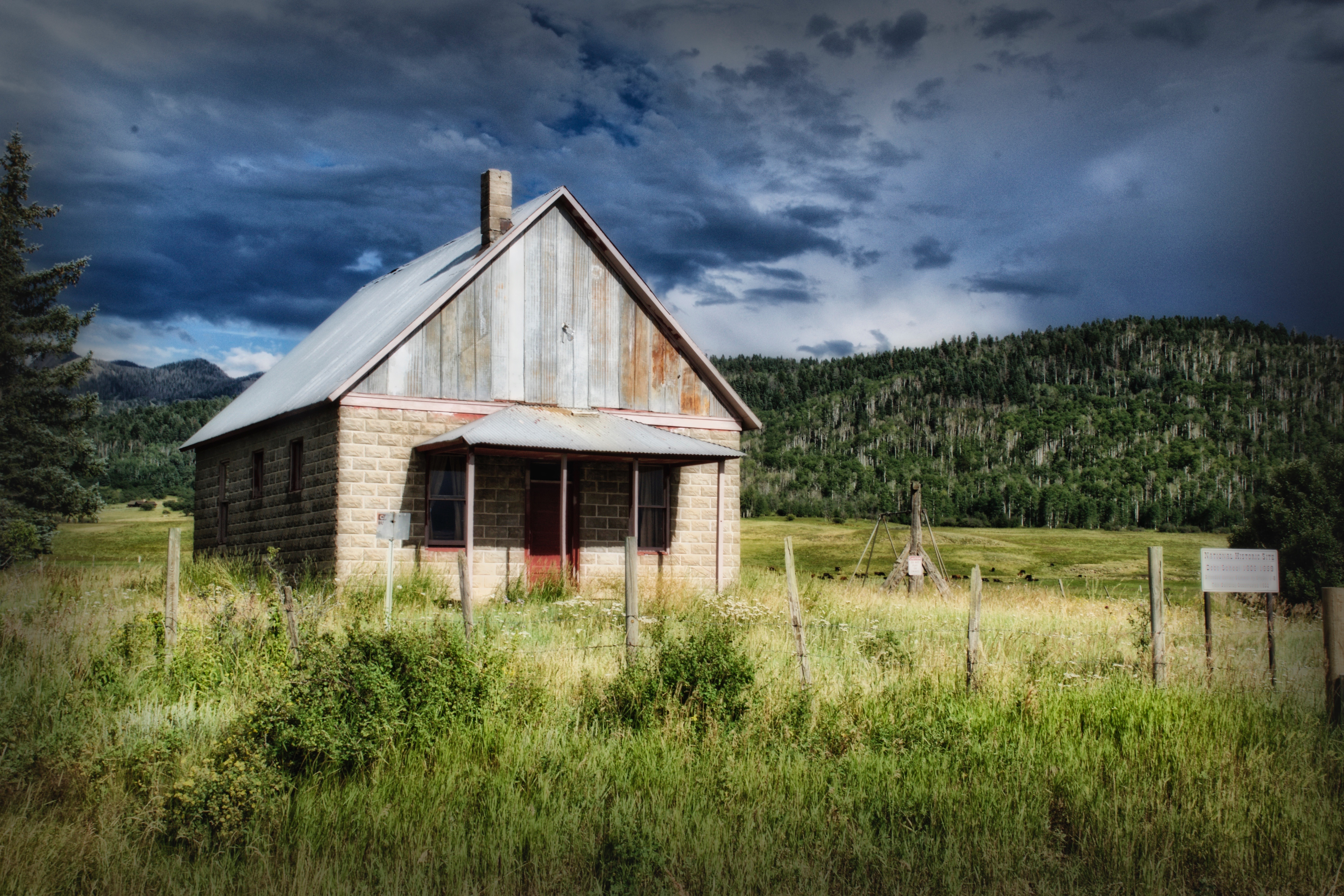

- Location within Colorado Location within the United States
- Location: 2783 McManus Road
- Nearest city: Pagosa Springs, Colorado
- Coordinates: 37°26′16″N 107°09′44″W
- Area: less than one acre
- Built: 1926
- Built by: Curs, Walter
- Architectural style: Rural Schoolhouse
- MPS: Rural School Buildings in Colorado MPS
- NRHP reference No.: 05000338
- Added to NRHP: April 28, 2005

The Debs School is an historic rural schoolhouse that was built in 1926 in Hinsdale County, Colorado. It is located near Pagosa Springs, Colorado. It has also been known as Upper Piedra School, 5HN642, and the Debs Community Building. It was listed on the National Register of Historic Places in 2005.

It is Hinsdale County's only surviving one-room schoolhouse. It was deemed significant for its architecture: its exterior walls are built of rock face ornamental concrete blocks, one of three identified schools in the state using that construction. It was named after a socialist labor leader Eugene Debs. It served as a school from 1926 to 1951; it also served as a meeting hall.
