= Deb =

Deb or DEB may refer to:

== People ==
- Deb (surname)
- Deb (given name)
- A débutante
- Debbie Deb, stage name of American singer and songwriter Deborah Wesoff-Kowalski (born 1966)
- Deb Never, stage name of an American singer-songwriter (born 1993 or 1994)

== Arts and entertainment ==
- Deb (album), a 2005 album by Souad Massi
- The Deb, a 2022 Australian stage musical
  - The Deb (film), the 2024 Australian adaptation of the musical

== DEB ==
- Dynamic energy budget theory (DEB theory), a metabolic theory
- Epidermolysis bullosa dystrophica (dystrophic EB), a disease
- German Ice Hockey Federation (Deutscher Eishockey Bund)
- Diepoxybutane, an industrial chemical
- Distant Education Bureau, India
- New South Wales 900/800 class railcar (DEB sets), Australian rolling stock

== Other uses ==
- deb (file format), Debian
- Debrecen International Airport IATA airport code
- Deb Shops, a former American clothing chain

== See also ==
- Debs (disambiguation)
- DAB (disambiguation)
