= Devorah Baum =

British author

Devorah Baum is a British academic, author, and filmmaker. She is Professor of English Literature at the University of Southampton, with research interests in representations of marriage, docufiction (cinema) and life-writing/autofiction (literature), humour, feelings, and psychoanalysis. She is known for her writing on Jewish identity and for co-directing the documentary films The New Man (2016) and Husband (2022). She has contributed to The Guardian, The New York Times, and Granta.

== Life and education ==
Baum was brought up in Southwest London and read English Literature at the University of Bristol.

Baum is married to the filmmaker Josh Appignanesi. They have two sons; the birth of their first son was the subject of their documentary The New Man.

== Writing ==
In 2017 Baum published Feeling Jewish. In the book, Baum argues that feelings of anxiety, guilt, paranoia, self-consciousness, and shame are not fixed traits of Jewish identity but historically produced, culturally mediated ways of experiencing modern life. The book was praised in The Yale Review for being "rendered with a vulnerable elegance that expresses the symbiotic nature of so many things that we would rather envisage as separate and impermeable." The press tour for the book was the subject of her documentary movie Husband.

In the same year she published The Jewish Joke, a collection with commentaries. A review in The Economist noted that "even the most avid collectors of Jewish jokes are likely to find fresh material in it," and pointed out its status as a companion volume to Feeling Jewish. The New Statesman praised the book for exploring "the sorrow that is the dark underside of laughter – sorrow that belongs to everyone." A more critical appraisal was published by The Washington Post, which argued that the book avoided examining the darkness underlying Jewish humour.

Baum and Appignanesi co-edited a special issue of Granta, The Politics of Feeling, in 2019, gathering works by Olga Tokarczuk, Nick Laird, Hisham Matar, David Baddiel, and Peter Pomarentsev.

On Marriage, published in 2023, is a cultural and philosophical exploration of the institution of marriage. The book examines its historical persistence, social meanings, and varied representations in literature, film and philosophy. The New Yorker summarised that "Baum is convinced that marriage, over all, might provide a moral and social good" while noting that "her selections are mostly of the sort produced and consumed by members of the transatlantic cultural cognoscenti."

== Filmmaking ==
The New Man, released in 2016, documented the couple's attempts to conceive. It explores fatherhood's impact on Appignanesi as well as Baum's physically and psychologically fraught pregnancy. Peter Bradshaw described the work as "more than a home movie, more a cine memoir" while noting "an army of supporting characters, from the director's well connected social life […] Appignanesi is able to get impromptu interviews with John Berger, Antony Gormley and Slavoj Žižek."

Husband, a spiritual sequel to The New Man, was released in 2022. It follows the couple during a trip to New York for Baum's book tour, blending elements of autofiction and documentary. The narrative largely centres on Baum's professional commitments, including a public dialogue with Zadie Smith. Critics noted Appignanesi's attempts to support her while documenting the experience with his camera, often foregrounding his own anxieties and neuroses.

== Bibliography ==
- Feeling Jewish: A Book for Just About Anyone. London: Yale University Press. 2017.
- The Jewish Joke: An Essay with Examples (Less Essay, More Examples). London: Profile Books. 2017.
- On Marriage. London: Penguin. 2023.

== Filmography ==
- The New Man (co-director), 2016
- Husband (co-director), 2022
