= Deborah Andollo =

Cuban free diver and diving instructor

Personal information
- Full name: Deborah Andollo Lopez
- Born: 1967 (age 58–59) Havana, Cuba
- Education: University of Havana

Sport
- Sport: Freediving

Deborah Andollo Lopez, also known as Deborah Andollo, (born in Havana in 1967) is a Cuban free-diving athlete who held several world records in different disciplines. In 1996, she set a free-diving record of about 357 feet. On the "AIDA website’s world record history in both constant weight and No-Limits. In 1996 she excelled in constant 61 metres (200 ft) and no-limits 110 metres (360 ft), and did 100 metres (330 ft) in variable weight in Italy.

== Career ==
According to On Cuba News in 2012, Andollo held "16 world records in four different divisions of apnea diving; she also won the 1996 Marine Oscar and was voted World’s Best Diver in 1997," and was "Twice included on the list of the country’s top 10 athletes (1996 and 1997) and chosen as one of the 100 Best Cuban Athletes of the 20th Century, [and] received the Platinum Pro5000 Diver Award in November 2011, a prize that is granted to outstanding divers who have completed more than 5,000 dives." Her nicknames "The Antillean mermaid," "Mermaid of the Deep", "Neptune’s Bride," and "Queen of the Caribbean," are related to her diving abilities.

A 2001 CNN profile of Andollo stated that she "can free dive more than 100 metres (330 ft) on one breath. This exceeds the depth most World War II submarines could descend before imploding."

Her first constant ballast dive only took her to 60 metres (200 ft), but with a duration of 2 minutes, 16 seconds. In 1993, she hit the 80 meter mark in a variable-ballast direct-immersion dive lasting 2 minutes and 50 seconds. A year later, on July 5, 1994, she spent 2 minutes, 24 seconds to get down 61 meters with constant ballast, a women's world record. Then, on May 26, 1995, at Cayo Largo, she free-dived to 60 metres (200 ft) without mask or fins, in two minutes and 52 seconds.

There remained to break the mythical 107 meter variable ballast no limits record, set by Angela Bandini in November 1989. On May 16, 1996 at Pasaje Escondido, just off Punta Frances, Andollo mounted her 31 kg ballast sled for her world record attempt. Her descent was linear to a depth of 60 metres (200 ft), where she slowed to compensate. She reached her base platform in 1 minute and 15 seconds. At 2 minutes, and 15 seconds she was back topside with the new women's world Variable no limits breath-held record of 110 metres (360 ft), or approximately 357 feet (109 m).

She is heavily involved with the “Blue Yemaya Diving School, Havana", and became its spokesperson. This is the centerpiece of a freediving educational program. It is a partnership of Andollo, Cubanacan Nautica (a Cuban governmental association), and ACUC (Association of Canadian Underwater Councils). In addition to free diving, the school teaches scuba diving and "ACUC, an international certifying agency, provides the accreditation of my freediving course,” which is a certification for free diving. Andollo posits that diving is an interrelated family composed of "apnea, spearfishing/underwater hunting and scuba (air, nitrox, trimix)." Training includes Yoga, mysticism and meditation.

== Education ==
She earned a degree in Physical Education at Havana University and started out her athletic career in figure swimming in 1979. In 1992 she switched to breath-held diving, and came to the attention of trainer Omar Oramas. He could see that the petite Cubana, only 5.3 feet (1.6 m) and 57 kilograms (126 lb) but with a 6 liters (1.3 imp gal; 1.6 U.S. gal) lung capacity, had the potential to reach great depths.

== Personal life ==
Andollo Lopez is the mother of a son named Ernesto and a daughter. She is also engaged in audiovisual projects, teaches diving, and is involved in the ecological movement and environmental education. She resides in Mexico, and has a nonprofit diving academy.

== Records ==
Records set by Andollo include the following.

| Depth | Modality | Date | Place |
|---|---|---|---|
| 110 m | No Limits | May 1996 | Isla de la Juv., Cuba (CMAS/AIDA) |
| 65 m | constant ballast | Dec 1997 | Isla de la Juv., Cuba (CMAS) |
| 95 m | variable ballast | Jul 2000 | Parghelia, Italy (AIDA) |
