= Sanjukta Deb =

British professor of biomaterials science

Sanjukta Deb is a British professor of biomaterials science at the Centre for Oral, Clinical & Translational Sciences at King's College London (KCL), United Kingdom. She joined KCL in 1996.

== Biography ==
Deb earned a PhD in chemistry from Delhi University in 1986. According to Scopus, she has published more than 162 scientific documents with 2487 citations and an h-index of 26. She has presented her work at various national and international conferences. Sanjukta has also authored many book chapters. She is an editor and a reviewer for several international scientific journals in the field of biomaterials science. She is currently editing a book on Bone Cements with Woodhead Publishing. Her profile on ORCID can be found here.

== Journal editorial/reviewer role ==
Deb is an editor for Journal of Biomaterials Application (associate editor), Journal of Tissue Science & Engineering (associate editor), and Journal of the American Ceramic Society (guest editor).

She is also a peer-reviewer for Biomaterials, Cell Interactions, Dental Materials, Journal of Applied Polymer Science, Journal of Biomaterial Science, Journal of Biomedical Materials Research, Journal of Materials Science, Journal of Oral Rehabilitation, Proceedings of the Institution of Mechanical Engineers, Journal of Engineering in Medicine, The European Journal for Prosthodontics, and Materials in Medicine.

Deb is a member of the Medical Health regulatory Agency, UK; Wellcome Trust; EPSRC; the Lottery Grants Committee; and the European Society for Biomaterials.

== Awards ==
She also won The Biocompatibles Endowed Prize in 2008. Sanjukta received a Fellow of Academy of Dental Materials (FADM) in 2001. She was also a chair at the Royal Society of Chemistry, Biomaterials Chemistry interest group. Prof Deb served the UK Society of Biomaterials as a secretary and a president.

== Selected publications ==
- Influence of a polymerizable eugenol derivative on the antibacterial activity and wettability of a resin composite for intracanal post cementation and core build-up restoration.
- A resin composite material containing a eugenol derivative for intracanal post cementation and core build-up restoration.
- Evaluation of dental adhesive systems incorporating an antibacterial monomer eugenyl methacrylate (EgMA) for endodontic restorations.
- Evaluation of a Β-Calcium Metaphosphate Bone Graft Containing Bone Morphogenetic Protein-7 in Rabbit Maxillary Defects.

== Selected books ==
- Deb, S. (2008). Orthopaedic Bone Cements. Elsevier. ISBN 978-1-84569-517-0.
- Deb, S., ed. (2015). Biomaterials for Oral and Craniomaxillofacial Applications. Karger Medical and Scientific Publishers. ISBN 978-3-318-02461-6.
