= Deb Gilbertson =

New Zealand innovation and entrepreneurship consultant

Deb Gilbertson CNZM
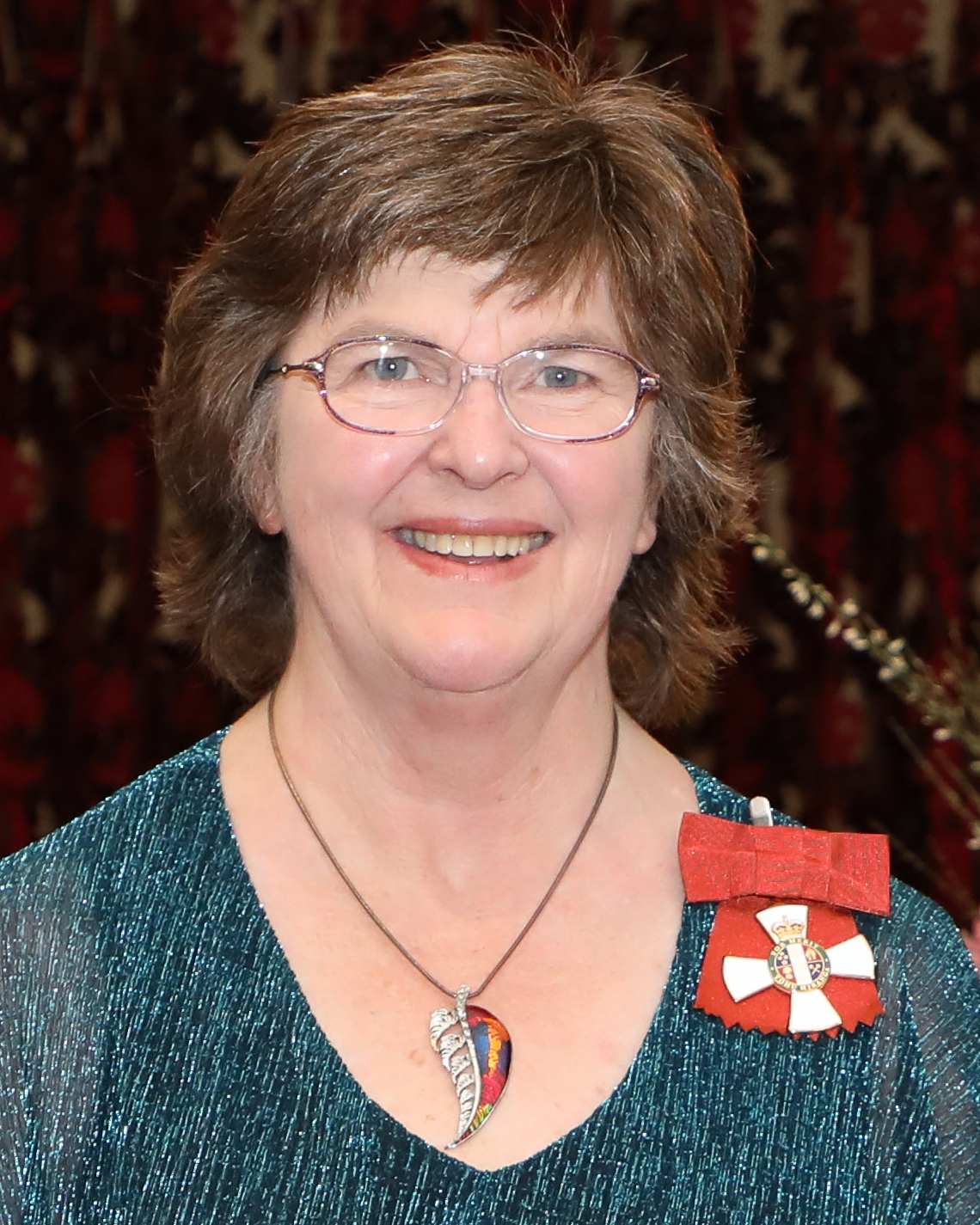
- Born: Deborah Kennedy Gilbertson
- Awards: Companion of the New Zealand Order of Merit, honorary doctor of Lincoln University

Academic background
- Education: Lincoln University

Deborah Kennedy Gilbertson CNZM is a New Zealand entrepreneurship academic and educational consultant. In 2023, Gilbertson was appointed a Companion of the New Zealand Order of Merit for services to business, science and technology. Her Global Enterprise Experience contest was awarded a United Nations Alliance of Civilizations Award, and Gilbertson was awarded an honorary degree by Lincoln University in 2024.

== Career ==
Gilbertson completed a Bachelor of Agricultural Commerce degree at Lincoln University in 1980, and worked at Lincoln's Agricultural Economics Research Unit, where she introduced the National Goat Industry Development workshop to support the industry. In the 1980s, Gilbertson developed a Women in Science Network through the Department of Scientific and Industrial Research (DSIR), and followed this with the Women in Agriculture Network, which within ten years had 10,000 members. Gilbertson also founded the Emergent Māori Women’s Leadership Programme, and ran a venture capital workshop to increase industry capacity. She was a co-founder of Wellington Venture Capital Association. Gilbertson also chaired DSIR's Science and Technological Advisory Council, and taught into a number of programmes at Victoria University of Wellington.

Gilbertson established an education trust, Te Kaihau, in 2006, which "grows leaders to innovate for a better world", increasing cross-culturalism and encouraging social entrepreneurship in 135 countries. Gilbertson judged the Prime Minister's Awards for Public Sector Excellence for 15 years.

== Honours and awards ==
In the 2023 King's Birthday and Coronation Honours, Gilbertson was appointed a Companion of the New Zealand Order of Merit for services to business, science and technology. She was awarded a United Nations Alliance of Civilizations Award for her ‘Global Enterprise Experience’ contest. Gilbertson was awarded an honorary degree by Lincoln University in 2024.

== Selected works ==
- Gilbertson, Deborah Kennedy; Virginia Cathro; Morne Mail; Anelda Mail (2024). "Using Coaching to Support Experiential Learning in Global Virtual Teams (GVTs) – Interrogating Perceptions of Impact". Journal of University Teaching and Learning Practice. 21 (09). doi:10.53761/0xm6wg52. Wikidata Q130488869.
- Virginia Cathro; Paula O’Kane; Gilbertson, Deborah Kennedy (2017). "Assessing reflection: Understanding skill development through reflective learning journals". Education and Training. 59 (4): 427–442. doi:10.1108/et-01-2017-0008. Wikidata Q130488870.
