= Debi =

Debi is a given name and a surname.

- Anurupa Debi (1882–1958), Indian writer
- Debi Prasad Roy Chowdhury, Indian sculptor, painter and educator
- Debi Austin (1950–2013), American anti-smoking advocate
- Debi Derryberry, American voice actress
- Debi Diamond (born 1965), American adult actress
- Debi Doss, American photographer and singer
- Debi Edward, British television broadcaster
- Debi Farr (born c. 1955), American politician
- Debi Ghosal, Indian politician
- Debi Gliori (born 1959), British writer and illustrator
- Debi Jones (born 1958)
- Debi Laszewski (born 1969), American bodybuilder
- Debi Mae West, American voice actress
- Debi Nova, Costa Rican singer-songwriter
- Debi Prasad Pal (1927–2021)
- Debi Prasad Sarkar (born 1958), Indian biochemist
- Debi Prasanna Pattanayak (born 1931), Indian linguist
- Debi Purcell, American female mixed martial artist
- Debi Rose, American politician
- Debi Roy (born 1940)
- Debi Singh Tewatia (1930–2017)
- Debi Smith, American folk singer-songwriter
- Debi Soren, Indian politician
- Debi Sue Voorhees, American director, actress and writer
- Debi Thomas, American former figure skater and physician
- Debi Towns (born 1956), American politician

== See also ==
- Debbie
- Devi (disambiguation)
