= Arthur Koestler: The Story of a Friendship =

Book cover of Arthur Koestler: The Story of a Friendship
- Book cover of First U.S. edition. G Mikes (left) and A. Koestler
- Author: George Mikes
- Publisher: Andre Deutsch
- Pages: 80
- ISBN: 0-233-97612-4 (cloth)
- OCLC: 10366618
- Dewey Decimal: 828/.91209 B 19
- LC Class: PR6021.O4 Z65 1983

Arthur Koestler: The Story of a Friendship is a book by George Mikes published in 1983, soon after Arthur Koestler’s suicide. As the author states in the Introduction, the book is not a biography of the subject but a series of recollections and anecdotes of a friendship spanning more than thirty years from 1952 up to the time of Koestler’s suicide in March 1983.
