= Dęby =

Dęby may refer to the following places:

- Dęby, Kuyavian-Pomeranian Voivodeship (north-central Poland)
- Dęby, Lublin Voivodeship (east Poland)
- Dęby, Pomeranian Voivodeship (north Poland)
- Dęby, Masovian Voivodeship (east-central Poland)
- Dęby, Lubusz Voivodeship (west Poland)
- Dęby, Warmian-Masurian Voivodeship (north Poland)
