= Debra =

Debra is a feminine given name. Notable people and fictional characters with the name include:

== People ==
- Debra Adelaide (born 1958), Australian writer
- Debra Allbery (born 1957), American poet
- Debra R. Anderson (1949–2022), American politician
- Debra Austin (born 1955), American ballerina
- Debra Berger (born 1957), American actress, artist and designer
- Debra Bermingham, American artist
- Debra Bloomfield (born 1952), American photographer
- Debra Bowen (born 1955), American politician, Secretary of State of California from 2007 to 2015
- Debra Brown, American serial killer
- Debra M. Brown (born 1963), American judge
- Debra Burlingame (born 1954), American lawyer and political activist
- Debra Byrd, American vocalist
- Debra Byrne (born 1957), Australian pop singer, actress and entertainer
- Debra Cafaro (born 1957) American business executive
- Debra Chasnoff (1957–2017), documentary filmmaker and activist
- Debra Christofferson, American actress of film and TV
- Debra Crew (born 1970), corporate chief executive
- Debra Daley, New Zealand author
- Debra Daniel (born 1991), Micronesian swimmer
- Debra Dickerson (born 1959), American author
- Debra Dobkin, American musician
- Debra Doyle (1952–2020), American author
- Debra Dunning (born 1966), American actress
- Debra Eisenstadt, American writer, director, producer and editor
- Debra Elmegreen (born 1952), American astronomer
- Debra Evenson (1942–2011), American lawyer
- Debra Feuer, American actress
- Debra Fischer, professor of astronomy
- Debra Jo Fondren (born 1955), American model and actress
- Debra Ford, colorectal surgeon and academic administrator
- Debra Forster (born 1961), Australian swimmer
- Debra Fox, American journalist
- Debra Fordham, American television executive
- Debra Gauthier, American police officer and author
- Debra Gillett, English actress
- Debra Gore (born 1967), British swimmer
- Debra Granik (born 1963), American independent film director
- Debra Green, British writer and speaker
- Debra Haffner (born 1954), ordained minister
- Debra Hamel (born 1964), American historian
- Debra Hand, American sculptor
- Debra Hayward, British film producer
- Debra Hill (1950–2005), American film producer and screenwriter
- Debra Hilstrom (born 1968), American politician
- Debra Holloway (1955–2011), U.S. Olympian in taekwondo
- Debra Humphris, English academic and nurse
- Debra Jensen (born 1958), American model
- Debra A. Kemp (1957–2015), American author
- Debra Killings (born 1966), American singer and bass guitarist
- Debra Kolodny, bisexual rights activist and congregational rabbi
- Debra Lafave (born 1980), American convicted sex offender
- Debra Lampshire, mental health educator
- Debra Lawrance (born 1957), Australian actress
- Debra Laws (born 1956), American singer and actress
- Debra Lee, several people
- Debra Lehrmann (born 1956), American judge
- Debra Maffett (born 1956), American beauty queen and television host
- Debra J. Mazzarelli (born 1955), New York politician
- Debra Marshall (born 1960), American former professional wrestling manager, actress and former WWF/E Diva
- Debra Mason (born 1968), British long-distance runner
- Debra Meiburg, Master of Wine
- Debra Messing (born 1968), American actress
- Debra McGee (born 1958), English television, radio and stage performer
- Debra McGrath (born 1954), Canadian actress and comedian
- Debra Milke (born 1964), American wrongfully convicted inmate
- Debra Monk (born 1949), American actress, singer, and writer
- Debra Moody (born 1956), American politician
- Debra Monroe, American writer
- Debra Mooney (born 1947), American actress
- Debra Mullins (born 1957), Australian judge
- Debra Nails (born 1950), American philosopher
- Debra Opri, American lawyer
- Debra Oswald (born 1959), Australian writer
- Debra Paget (born 1933), American actress
- Debra Pepler, Canadian psychologist
- Debra Peppers, American broadcaster
- Debra Phillips (born in 1958), Australian artist
- Debra Ponzek, American chef
- Debra L. Reed (born 1957), American businesswoman
- Debra Richtmeyer (born 1957), American classical saxophonist
- Debra Ringold (born 1954), American academic
- Debra R. Rolison, physical chemist at the Naval Research Laboratory
- Debra Rupp (born 1951), American film and television actress
- Debra Sandlund (born 1962), American television and film actress
- Debra Sapenter, American sprinter
- Debra Satz, American philosopher
- Debra Saunders (born 1954), American journalist
- Debra Saunders-White, American politician
- Debra Saylor (born 1962), American pianist, classical singer and voice instructor
- Debra Searle (born 1975), British adventurer, television presenter, author and motivational speaker
- Debra Searles. Australian theoretical chemist
- Debra Shipley (born 1957), politician in the United Kingdom
- Debra Silverstein, American politician
- Debra Solomon, filmmaker and animator
- Debra Sparrow, Musqueam weaver, artist and knowledge keeper
- Debra Stephenson (born 1972), British actress
- Debra Stock (born 1962), former English international cricketer
- Debra Teare (1955–2018), American artist
- Debra Thomas (born 1967), American former figure skater and physician
- Debra Todd (born 1957), American judge
- Debra Townsley, American academic administrator
- Debra Waples (born 1953), American fencer
- Debra Webb, American writer
- Debra Weinstein, American poet
- Debra Winger (born 1955), American actress
- Debra Wilson (born 1962), American comedian and actress
- Debra Wilson (born 1977), New Zealand law professor
- Debra Wong Yang, former United States Attorney for the Central District of California
- Debra Zane, American casting director

== Fictional characters ==
- Debra Barone, from the American television comedy series Everybody Loves Raymond
- Debra Dean, on the British series EastEnders
- Debra Morgan, in the television show based on Jeff Lindsay's Dexter book series
- Debra Whitman, comic book character in Marvel Comics

== See also ==
- Debrah
- Deborah (disambiguation)
