= Sam Charles =

American artist, pianist, professor

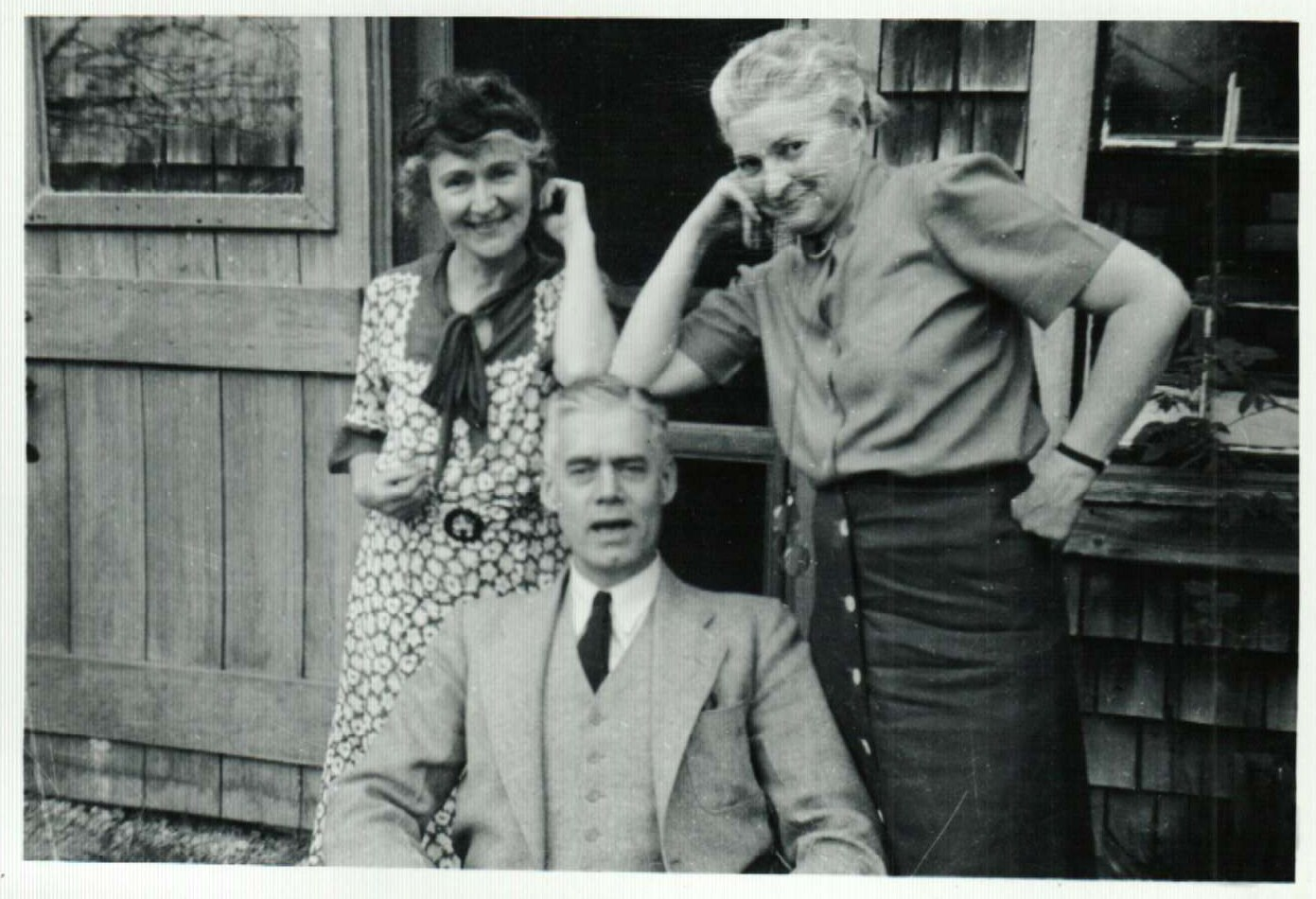
- Rosalia B. Parker, Sam Charles and Marian Charles (his wife)
- Born: 1887; Agawam, Massachusetts
- Died: 1949 (aged 61–62)
- Occupation: Artist

Sam Charles (1887–1949) was an American artist, pianist and professor. He was born in Agawam, Massachusetts, and was a life-long New Englander, living primarily in Wellesley, Massachusetts.

He served on the music faculty of Smith College in Northampton, Massachusetts and at Groton School. He admired and performed the music of modern (to his time) French composers, particularly Claude Debussy. He was a well-known New England artist, painting primarily landscapes in watercolor, with a unique, free-flowing style, making skilled use of unpainted space.

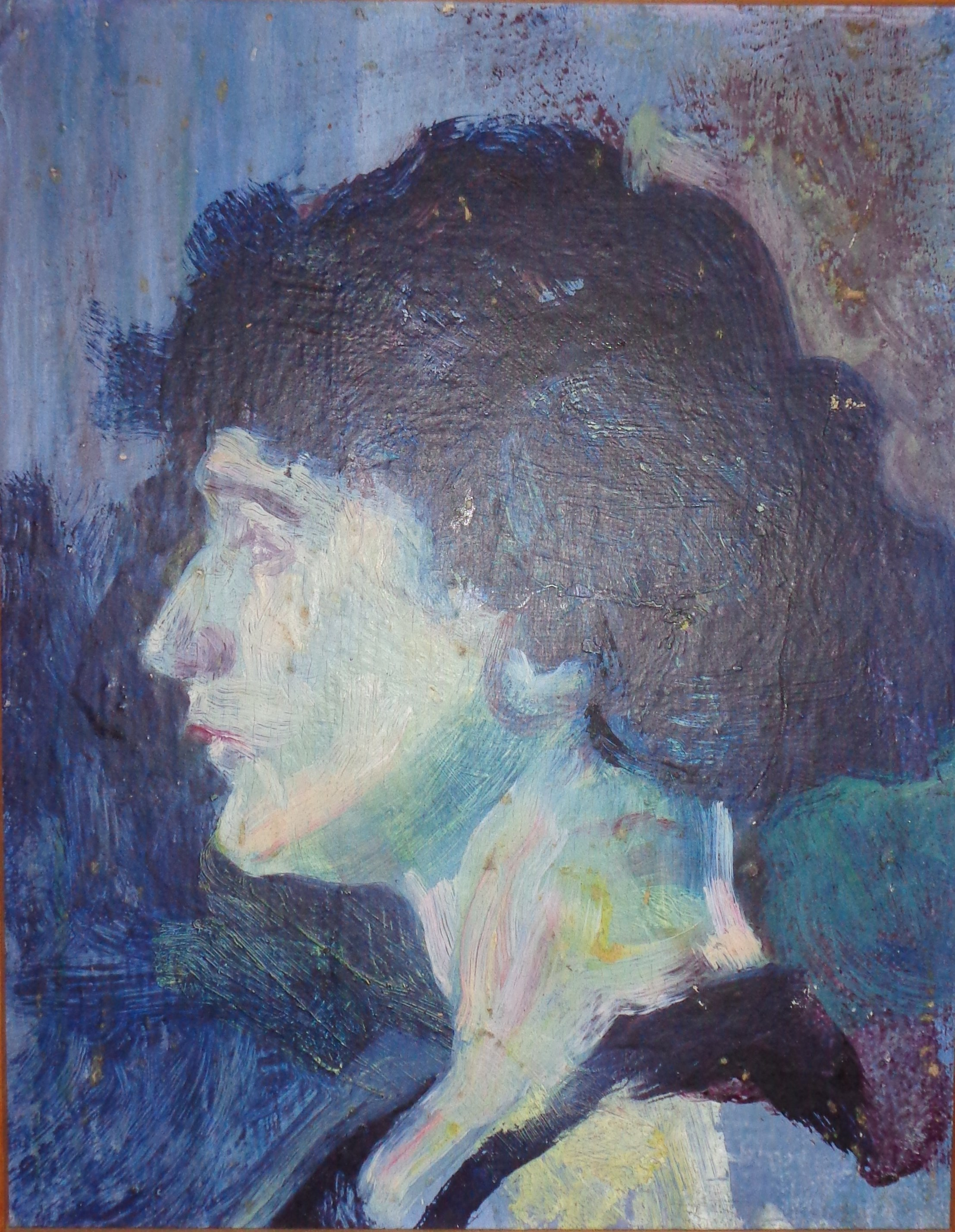
Painting of Rosalia B. Parker by Sam Charles

He was also a very talented artist in oil, and painted at least two portraits: one of Rosalia B. Parker (Mrs. Maurice W. Parker, Sr.) and one of her father, Louis Besserer. Charles was a dear friend of the Parker family, and visited their home in Cohasset, Massachusetts often, which had the advantage of having no close neighbors, so he could play piano as loud and long as he wanted without disturbing anyone. In describing Charles' painting technique, Boston Globe writer A. J. Philpott credited Charles with having “a style all his own” and being one who is “is impressionistic and gets his effects with a rare economy of line and color.” His works were described by fellow Globe writer Edgar J. Driscoll, Jr. as follows: “Simplicity is the key to most of his works, for the artist describes with spare brush work the out-of-doors scenes which catch his eye. The results have a great deal of quiet charm.”

Charles visited Europe on multiple occasions, where he performed piano and painted a number of works described as “bright, fresh, clear and happy recordings of sleeping European villages,” in addition to the numerous New England scenes for which he was known.
