= Prachi Dhabal Deb =

Indian cake artist

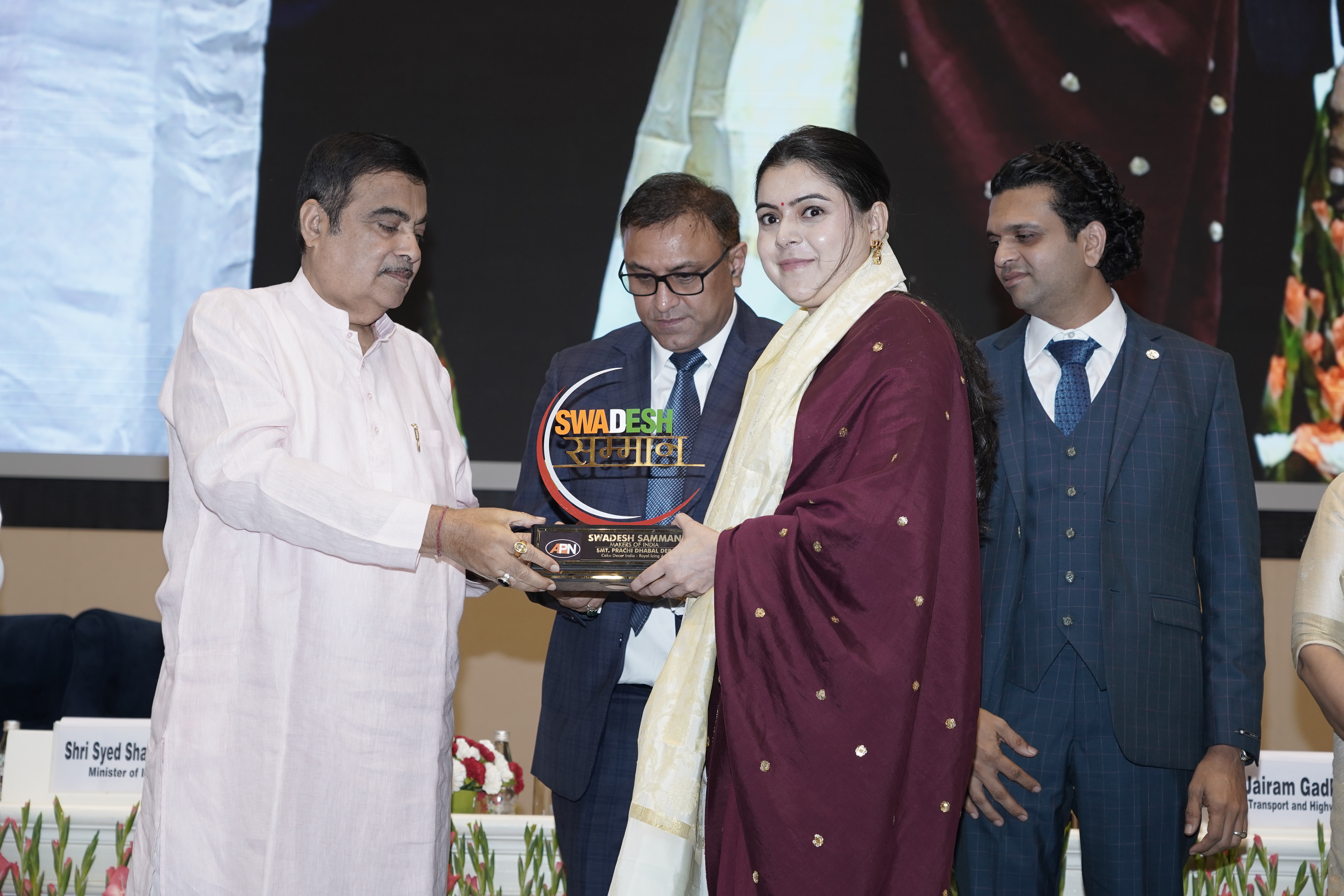
- Nitin Gadkari giving award by APN Live to Prachi Dhabal Deb
- Born: Prachi Singh; 1986 (age 39–40); Rewa district, Madhya Pradesh
- Education: University of Calcutta
- Occupation: Cake designer
- Spouse: Pranabesh Dhabal Deb
- Children: Shrihaan Dhabal Deb
- Parents: Rajan Singh (father); Anuradha Singh (mother)

Prachi Dhabal Deb (born 1986) is an Indian cake artist. At Vigyan Bhawan in Delhi, she received an award for her cakes by Union Minister of Road Transport and Highways of India, Nitin Gadkari. She is an Associate Artist with the Oxford Centre for Hindu Studies. At the Bharat Leadership Awards in 2021 she received award from Governor of Maharashtra, Bhagat Singh Koshiyari. She has created a 100-kg cake and a 200-kg cake.

== Early life and education ==
Prachi Dhabal Deb was born as Prachi Singh in Rewa district of Madhya Pradesh to Rajan Singh and Anuradha Singh in 1986.

== Personal life ==
Prachi Dhabal Deb is married to Pranabesh Dhabal Deb and they live in Pune, Maharashtra. They have one son.

== Awards and honours ==
In December 2025, Prachi was appointed as an Associate Artist with the Oxford Centre for Hindu Studies, an independent research centre based in Oxford, United Kingdom. Her work in royal icing art and cultural heritage has been recognised in this academic and artistic context.

- World Book of Records 2023
- Featured in History TV18
- World Book of Records London 2022
- Femina Achievers of the year
- World Book of Records 2021
- Nitin Gadkari presented Swadesh Samman by APN Live
