= Deb Willet =

British maid employed by Samuel Pepys (1650–1678)

Deborah Willet (1650–1678) was a young maid employed by Samuel Pepys (1633–1703), an English naval administrator and Member of Parliament. She and Pepys, 17 years her senior, engaged in a liaison that was chronicled in his famous diary. When Pepys's diary first was published in the late 19th century, the more explicit parts describing the author's affair with Willet were not printed. They were included in the 2002 edition of the diary.

== Early life ==
Willet was the third of seven children born to the Bristol merchant Robert Willet and his wife Elizabeth. She was baptised in December 1650.

== Willet and Pepys ==
In late September 1667, Pepys was introduced to Willet and she was employed as a companion for Pepys's wife, Elisabeth, from 1 October 1667, with whom she attended the theatre. In late October 1668, Willet began an intimate relationship with Samuel Pepys. Elisabeth Pepys discovered her husband with Willet and after a few weeks the maid was dismissed. Pepys wrote in his diary that his wife "coming up suddenly, did find me imbracing the girl con [with] my hand sub [under] su [her] coats; and endeed I was with my main [hand] in her cunny. I was at a wonderful loss upon it and the girl also...." Following this event, he was characteristically filled with remorse, writing of being "absolutely resolved ... never to give [Elisabeth] occasion while I live of more trouble of this or any other kind ... and to be true to my poor wife". Equally characteristically, he continued to pursue Willet after she had been dismissed from the Pepys household.

Pepys later gave Willet money, sought her out at her new home, and kissed her. His wife discovered the meeting and threatened to walk out on Pepys, so long as he would give her "3 or 400l" to keep her quiet, and threatened to slit Deb's nose. The situation was calmed down with the help of an old family friend, William Hewer, but Pepys was forced to renounce Willet in writing.

Willet was not the only personal servant with whom Pepys was intimate, but she appears to have been the one with whom he was most smitten. In the next-to-last sentence of Pepys's 10-year diary one reads, "my amours to Deb are past."

== After Pepys ==
In 2006, Kate Loveman reported that Willet remained in London after leaving the Pepys household, marrying a theology graduate named Jeremiah Wells in 1670. Pepys later helped Wells obtain a position as a ship's chaplain. The couple had two daughters, Deborah (b. 1670) and Elizabeth (b. 1672). Mrs Wells died in 1678 and her husband followed a year and a half later.
