= Stephen Charles (cricketer) =

English cricketer and British Army officer (1858–1950)

Personal information
- Full name: Stephen Flockton Charles
- Born: 17 August 1858; Romford, Essex, England
- Died: 24 June 1950 (aged 91); Wroxham, Norfolk, England
- Batting: Right-handed
- Role: Wicket-keeper

Domestic team information
- Years: Team
- 1895–1905: Marylebone Cricket Club
- 1906–1907: Norfolk

Career statistics
Competition	First-class
Matches	8
Runs scored	143
Batting average	20.42
100s/50s	–/–
Top score	30
Catches/stumpings	4/5
- Source: Cricinfo, 15 July 2019

Stephen Flockton Charles (17 August 1858 − 24 June 1950) was an English first-class cricketer and British Army officer.

Charles was born at Kensington in August 1858. He was educated at Harrow School, before attending the Royal Military College, Sandhurst. He graduated from Sandhurst in February 1878, entering into the Middlesex Regiment as a second lieutenant, before resigning his commission with the Middlesex Regiment in April of the same year. He was serving with the Lancashire Fusiliers in 1880, with promotion to the rank of lieutenant coming in July 1880. He was promoted to the rank of captain in July 1888. He married Mina Steele Watson in 1890, with Charles seconded for service with the Auxiliary Forces in July of the same year, with him vacating the secondment in May 1893.

Charles made his debut in first-class cricket for the Marylebone Cricket Club (MCC) against Dublin University at Dublin in 1895. He made three further first-class appearances for the MCC in 1897, playing against Oxford and Cambridge Universities, in addition to the touring Philadelphians. He played two first-class matches for the Gentlemen in the Gentlemen v Players fixtures of 1897 and 1898. He was promoted to the rank of major in November 1897. He appeared in a first-class match for the MCC in 1899, against Derbyshire at Lord's. He was promoted to the rank of lieutenant colonel in April 1902, before retiring from active service in November 1903. He made a final appearance in first-class cricket for the MCC in 1905, against Oxford University at Lord's. In eight first-class matches, Charles scored a total of 143 runs at an average of 20.42, with a high score of 30. He played minor counties cricket for Norfolk in 1906 and 1907, making fourteen appearances in the Minor Counties Championship. He died at Wroxham in June 1950, at the age of 91.
