= Devorah Sperber =

American installation artist

Devorah Sperber is an American installation artist known for creating works out of spools of thread, chenille pipe cleaners and map tacks that act as optical illusions. Some of her work has involved using thousands of spools of thread to create pixelated versions of iconic works of art by famous artists. Her naming scheme for these works generally follows the format "After [Artist]/[Work]". For example, her creation of the Mona Lisa using spools of thread is titled After The Mona Lisa 2.

The spools are hung in long, adjacent columns to create a pointillist, inverted abstraction of a famous painting. When viewed by the naked eye, they are barely recognizable. When viewed through an optical device, usually a "viewing sphere" (a transparent sphere the size of a baseball) placed several feet in front of the spools), the abstractions are inverted and shrunk into a remarkably detailed and faithful image of the original painting. The resulting image is usually distorted the way objects are distorted when viewed through a fisheye lens: objects in the center are larger than they appear, and objects in the periphery are smaller than they appear. The horizon of the image viewed through the viewing sphere also bend and curve, depending on the viewer's perspective. Sperber has wittily used the fish eye; in her rendering of the Mona Lisa, the Mona Lisa's "elusive smile appears, changes, and disappears in a dramatic and humorous fashion".

Sperber exhibited at the Brooklyn Museum from January 26 to June 17, 2007 and at the Massachusetts Museum of Contemporary Art in 2008.
