= Debra Evenson =

American lawyer, professor (1942–2011)

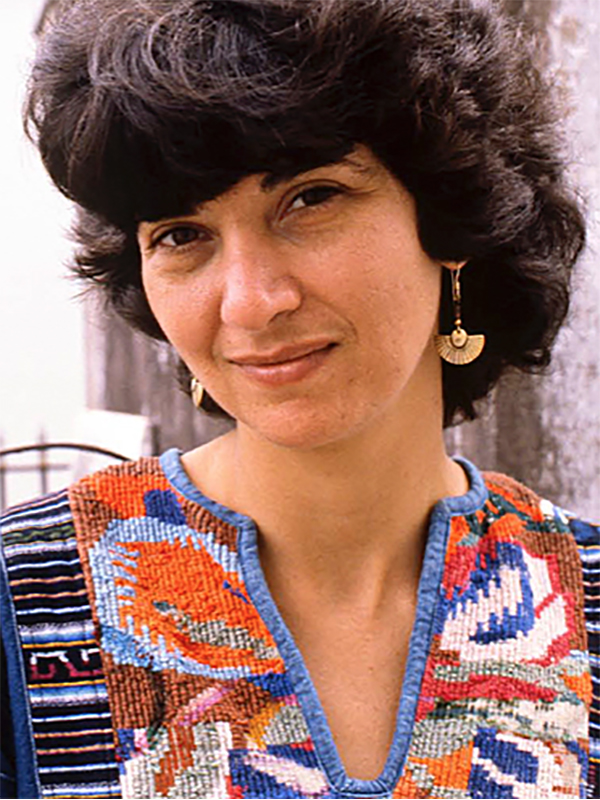
- Born: 1942; New Jersey, US
- Died: August 17, 2011 (aged 68–69); Chicago, Illinois, US
- Education: Barnard College, Rutgers Law School
- Occupations: Lawyer, professor

Debra Evenson (1942 – August 17, 2011) was an American legal expert on Cuba, a practicing lawyer, and an educator. She was president of the National Lawyers Guild from 1988 until 1991.

== Education and early career ==
Evenson was born in New Jersey in 1942. She attended Barnard College, graduating with a B.A. in 1964. Then, Evenson received a Juris Doctor from Rutgers Law School in 1976. After working on Wall Street, for the firm Wilkie, Farr, and Gallagher, Evenson took a position as an associate professor of Law at DePaul University in 1980.

== Career ==
Evenson first visited Cuba in 1982. She visited numerous times, conducting a study of the Cuban legal system since the revolution. She left DePaul University in 1992, and joined the New York City law firm Rabinowitz, Boudin, Standard, Krinsky & Lieberman. With the firm, Evenson represented the Cuban government, supporting Cuban sovereignty. She was also licensed to practice law in Cuba, where she worked with high government officials and civilians. In 1993, she was awarded a John D. and Catherine T. MacArthur Foundation grant to research the role of lawyers in the changing Cuban society. Evenson wrote dozens of articles on Cuban laws and institutions, and she represented Cuba in numerous important court cases. She was a "critical supporter of the Cuban revolution," and advocated for understanding Cuba as a complex system, successful in some areas and unsuccessful in others. Evenson arrived in Cuba as lawyers were necessary in society again, as the revolution gave way to institutions. Evenson was taken with the evolving legal landscape in Cuba and devoted her time and writing to it.

Evenson was part of the cohort of lawyers and scholars that revived the National Lawyers Guild (NLG) in the 1960s and 1970s. Later, from 1988 until 1991, Evenson served as president of the NLG. From 1996 until the early 2000s, Evenson was president of the Latin American Institute for Alternative Legal Services, a human rights legal group. In 2007, Evenson co-founded and served as executive director of the Center for Inter-American Legal Education, which supports education exchanges between lawyers and scholars in the United States and Latin America. She was a founding board member of the Sugar Law Center, which created an award in her honor following her death in 2011.

DePaul University Special Collections and Archives holds a collection of biographical information on Evenson, her publications, and notes, donated by Evenson in 2003.

== Bibliography ==
- "Midwives: Survival of an Ancient Profession." Women's Rights Law Reporter 7.4 (1982): 313–330.
- "Economic Regulation in Cuba: The State Arbitration System." Loy. LA Int'l & Comp. LJ 8 (1985): 371.
- "Women's Equality in Cuba: What Difference Does a Revolution Make." Law and Inequality: A Journal of Theory and Practice 4.2 (1986): 295–326.
- "Women's Rights and the Media." Guild Practitioner 48.1 (1991): 18–21.
- Revolution in the Balance: Law and Society in Contemporary Cuba (1994). Boulder, Colorado: Westview Press.
- Law and Society in Contemporary Cuba (2001). ISBN 187617529X
- Workers in Cuba: Unions and labour relations. Institute of Employment Rights, 2004.
- The Chosen Island: Jews in Cuba (2005), Maritza Corrales and Debra Evenson (translator). ISBN 0977176401
- "Cuba's Biotechnology Revolution." MEDICC review 9.1 (2007): 8-10.
- "Opening Paths to Renewed Popular Participation." Latin American Perspectives, Vol. 36, No. 2, Cuba: Interpreting a Half Century of Revolution and Resistance, Part 2 (Mar., 2009), pp. 95–103.
