= Deborah Davis =

Deborah Davis may refer to:

- Deborah Davis (screenwriter), British screenwriter, author of The Favourite and Marie Antoinette
- Deborah Dean Davis, American screenwriter for It Takes Two and The Incredible Hulk
- Deborah Davis, author of Katharine the Great: Katharine Graham and her Washington Post Empire
- Debbie Davis (model) (born 1951), American model
- Debbie McCune Davis (born 1951), Democratic politician
- Deborah Davis (hazzan), American cantor in Humanistic Judaism
- Deborah Ludwig Davis, actress in Hollywood Beat
- Deborah Davis, Miss West Virginia, 1979
- Deborah Davis, executive producer of Borderland
- Deborah J. Davis, County Prosecutor-elect of St. Joseph County, Michigan
- Deborah Kay Davis, wife of Michael W. Smith

== See also ==
- Debra Davis (born 1959), American politician
- Deborah Kay Davies, Welsh author
- Debbie Davies (born 1952), guitarist
