= Popularity of birth names for females (United States) =

Popularity of birth names for females in the United States lists the most popular names given baby girls between 1926 and 2025. The most popular names given baby girls are also listed by decades beginning in the 1880s. The data illustrates the rise and fall in the popularity of names given to baby girls.

The Social Security Administration rank orders for popular names from 1926 to 2025. Thus the numerical ranking does not take into account births between 1880 and 1925. The ranking is also influenced by the varying number of children born in each decade. In addition, people born before 1937 but alive in that year sometimes did not register for social security cards and are not included in the data. The years in which total births reached a peak in numbers with more than four million births are 1954-1964 and 2000-2009. Names popular in those years would likely rank higher on this list that names popular in years in which fewer births were recorded.

A few names -- Mary, Elizabeth, Sarah, and Anna -- have enduring popularity. They are listed in the top 200 popular baby female names for every decade from the 1880s to the 2020s. Others show a rise and fall in popularity over as few as five decades. Some (Susan, Emily, Amy, Amanda, and Emma) have risen and fallen and risen again in popularity.

The rise and fall of the popularity of a name can be remarkable. In 1938, for example, only 38 babies were given the name "Jennifer." In 1972, Jennifer was the most popular name given to girl babies born in the U.S. with 63,600. In 1974, 4.029 percent of the female babies born were given the name Jennifer. By 2025, Jennifer had fallen out of favor with only 501 babies given the name.

The Social Security Administration (SSA) compiled this information about female births. In accordance with SSA practice, names are listed with the exact spelling of the birth name. For example, "Sarah" and "Sara" are listed separately with "Sarah" on the top 50 list while "Sara" is not. "Katherine" is listed as a popular name, but "Catherine" is not among the most 50 most popular names.

== Rank in popularity of birth names given females born in the United States (a dash means not in top 200 names) ==
name	1926-2025 rank	1880s	1890s	1900s	1910s	1920s	1930s	1940s	1950s	1960s	1970s	1980s	1990s	2000s	2010s	2020s
Mary	1	1	1	1	1	1	1	1	1	2	16	36	39	65	127	132
Patricia	2	-	-	-	160	30	5	5	3	6	30	61	133	-	-	-
Jennifer	3	-	-	-	-	-	-	-	98	20	1	2	16	39	-	-
Linda	4	-	-	-	-	-	89	2	2	7	68	128	-	-	-	-
Elizabeth	5	4	5	6	8	11	17	25	21	17	12	9	8	9	11	15
Barbara	6	-	-	-	-	18	3	3	7	21	76	154	-	-	-	-
Susan	7	96	123	163	-	-	117	10	4	3	27	94	-	-	-	-
Jessica	8	-	-	-	-	-	-	-	-	-	11	1	1	23	175	-
Karen	9	-	-	-	-	-	138	16	8	4	25	84	130	170	-	-
Sarah	10	16	31	44	50	58	60	76	107	90	19	5	4	12	46	91
Lisa	11	-	-	-	-	-	-	-	37	1	6	31	119	-	-	-
Nancy	12	72	97	97	101	62	9	7	9	26	78	114	163	-	-	-
Sandra	13	-	-	-	-	-	48	6	12	11	44	96	174	-	-	-
Ashley	14	-	-	-	-	-	-	-	-	-	140	4	2	10	73	147
Emily	15	91	94	101	102	137	170	177	-	-	66	25	3	1	8	20
Kimberly	16	-	-	-	-	-	-	-	90	5	5	17	36	56	113	-
Michelle	17	-	-	-	-	-	-	196	93	9	4	12	32	72	185	-
Donna	18	-	-	-	-	104	23	17	10	8	64	-	-	-	-	-
Margaret	19	5	3	3	4	5	8	13	23	53	101	-	-	-	-	-
Carol	20	-	-	-	-	116	11	5	10	38	130	-	-	-	-	-
Betty	21	145	136	86	37	4	2	11	35	102	-	-	-	-	-	-
Amanda	22	93	119	175	-	-	-	-	-	99	17	3	6	63	-	-
Melissa	23	-	-	-	-	-	-	-	158	33	3	7	31	102	-	-
Deborah	24	-	-	-	-	-	-	68	5	12	61	189	-	-	-	-
Stephanie	25	-	-	-	-	-	-	191	119	45	9	6	14	51	-	-
Rebecca	26	105	122	146	163	175	163	66	28	41	13	22	23	71	-	-
Sharon	27	-	-	-	-	-	83	8	14	23	63	169	179	-	-	-
Cynthia	28	-	-	-	-	-	191	47	11	10	31	68	106	-	-	-
Laura	29	21	34	49	62	77	99	87	38	16	20	23	49	135	-	-
Amy	30	120	143	190	-	-	-	-	135	35	2	15	64	115	161	-
Kathleen	31	-	193	151	105	85	72	18	15	32	69	69	129	-	-	-
Angela	32	-	-	-	-	-	-	187	106	22	7	27	77	106	-	-
Emma	33	3	9	21	41	59	86	124	-	-	-	-	56	3	1	2
Shirley	34	-	-	-	129	17	3	14	33	105	-	-	-	-	-	-
Dorothy	35	127	57	7	3	2	6	20	58	124	-	-	-	-	-	-
Brenda	36	-	-	-	-	-	-	26	18	19	60	124	128	-	-	-
Nicole	37	-	-	-	-	-	-	-	-	186	10	8	7	48	145	-
Pamela	38	-	-	-	-	-	-	39	13	14	48	112	-	-	-	-
Samantha	39	-	-	-	-	-	-	-	-	-	109	26	5	8	33	112
Anna	40	2	2	4	7	13	32	71	104	95	87	52	35	24	39	79
Olivia	41	-	-	-	-	-	-	-	-	-	-	195	38	4	2	1
Katherine	42	54	64	62	52	63	97	77	65	77	55	32	27	37	84	164
Christine	43	165	160	153	122	123	129	51	31	27	22	45	102	-	-	-
Debra	44	-	-	-	-	-	-	26	18	19	60	104	128	-	-	-
Rachel	45	119	131	150	154	163	168	178	190	33	16	15	33	148	-	-
Maria	46	137	152	144	143	122	118	86	70	49	35	47	47	43	99	93
Carolyn	47	-	108	82	153	119	29	12	25	57	115	156	-	-	-	-
Janet	48	-	-	-	-	112	26	21	20	47	125	-	-	-	-	-
Heather	49	-	-	-	-	-	-	-	-	127	8	10	45	-	-	-
Diane	50	-	-	-	-	-	115	22	17	36	123	-	-	-	-	-

== Top 50 female birth names: Top year in rank and numbers of babies given that name (1880–2025) ==
Name	Overall rank (1926–2025)	Top year in ranking	Max. percentage	Highest number	Most popular years (in top 30 of female birth names)
Name	Overall rank (1926–2025)	Top year in ranking	of female babies given this name in any year		Most popular years (in top 30 of female birth names)
Mary	1	1880	7.300%	73,984 (1921)	1880-1982
Patricia	2	1951	3.056%	56,446 (1951)	1925-1974
Jennifer	3	1974	4.029%	63,600 (1972)	1965-2002
Linda	4	1948	5.521%	99,692 (1947)	1939-1968
Elizabeth	5	1880	1.987%	20,750 (1990)	1880-2025
Barbara	6	1974	4.029%	63,600 (1972)	1924-1966
Susan	7	1954	2.369%	47,418 (1955)	1941-1974
Jessica	8	1987	2.987%	55,992 (1987)	1974-2005
Karen	9	1956	1.945%	40,591 (1957)	1941-1975
Sarah	10	1981	1.575%	28,483 (1982)	1880-1882, 1974-2010
Lisa	11	1965	3.298%	60,271 (1965)	1957-1984
Nancy	12	1947	1.785%	32,445 (1947)	1930-1964
Sandra	13	1946	1.965%	34,779 (1947)	1937-1970
Ashley	14	1987	2.927%	54,856 (1987)	1982-2010
Emily	15	1999	1.363%	26,542 (1999)	1981-2024
Kimberly	16	1967	1.928%	34,130 (1970)	1960-1989
Michelle	17	1969	1.947%	34,319 (1967)	1963-1992
Donna	18	1959	1.754%	36,468 (1959)	1941-1967
Margaret	19	1916	2.298%	28,468 (1921)	1880-1957
Carol	20	1945	2.258%	34,284 (1946)	1933-1962
Betty	21	1930	3.278%	38,240 (1930)	1918-1951
Amanda	22	1987	2.229%	41,786 (1987)	1975-1999
Melissa	23	1979	1.976%	34,050 (1979)	1966-1993
Deborah	24	1954	2.746%	54,674 (1954)	1948-1969
Stephanie	25	1984	1.277%	24,864 (1990)	1967-1998
Rebecca	26	1974	0.968%	16,737 (1981)	1952-1956, 1969-1998
Sharon	27	1946	1.725%	28,533 (1947)	1938-1967
Cynthia	28	1957	1.875%	39,340 (1957)	1948-1973
Laura	29	1968	1.096%	18,967 (1964)	1880-1892, 1958-1990
Amy	30	1975	2.066%	32,254 (1975)	1966-1988
Kathleen	31	1949	1.501%	26,717 (1951)	1942-1964
Angela	32	1975	1.497%	25,901 (1971)	1963-1984
Emma	33	1881	1.501%	22,719 (2003)	1880-1908, 1998-2025
Shirley	34	1935	3.898%	42,366 (1935)	1923-1953
Dorothy	35	1923	3.117%	39,996 (1924)	1900-1948
Brenda	36	1951	1.183%	24,339 (1954)	1944-1966
Nicole	37	1985	1.252%	22,966 (1985)	1970-1999
Pamela	38	1954	1.374%	27,361 (1954)	1947-1971
Samantha	39	1991	1.261%	25,868 (1990)	1985-2013
Anna	40	1885	2.814%	15,666 (2018)	1880-1933, 1990-2020
Olivia	41	2014	1.014%	19,840 (2014)	1999-2025
Katherine	42	1988	0.580	11,625 (1990)	1984, 1986-1995
Christine	43	1968	0.967%	17,598 (1952)	1949-1952,1963-1978
Debra	44	1955	2.522%	50,563 (1955)	1951-1965
Rachel	45	1985	0.866%	16,369 (1958)	1975-2003
Maria	46	1964	0.518%	10,148 (1964)	1975
Carolyn	47	1942	1.437%	20,742 (1947)	1935-1955
Janet	48	1952	0.942%	18,477 (1954)	1933-1959
Heather	49	1975	1.557%	24,301 (1975)	1970-1991
Diane	50	1955	1.162%	23,290 (1955)	1942-1962

Note: Year of most popularity is listed by percentage of total female births. In a few cases, there may be more births with that name in one year but a higher percentage of births with that same name in another year.
