= Deborah (disambiguation) =

Deborah is a major character in the Book of Judges.

Deborah may also refer to:

== Given name ==
- Deborah (given name), a feminine given name
- Deborah (Genesis), the nurse of Rebecca, a minor character in the Book of Genesis

== Music ==
- Deborah (album), a 1996 album by Debbie Gibson
- Deborah (Handel), a 1733 oratorio by George Frideric Handel
- "Deborah", a 1974 song by Peter Ivers from Terminal Love
- "Deborah", a 1978 song by Dave Edmunds from Tracks on Wax 4
- "Deborah", a 1983 song by Jon and Vangelis from Private Collection

== Other uses ==
- Deborah Heart and Lung Center, a specialty hospital in New Jersey, United States
- Mount Deborah, a mountain in Alaska, United States
- Ferrari SP38 Deborah, a 2018 Italian one-off sports car
- Deborah, a British Mark IV tank
- Deborah number, used in rheology to characterize how "fluid" a material is
- Deborah (TV series), a 1967 Mexican telenovela

== See also ==
- Devorah
- Dvora (disambiguation)
- Debra (disambiguation)
