= Devora Bakon =

Israeli actress (1951–1983)

- דבורה בקון
- Born: 24 February 1951; Tel Aviv, Israel
- Died: 18 March 1983 (aged 32); Highway 40, Israel
- Occupation: Actress
- Years active: 1974–1983

Devora Bakon (Hebrew: דבורה בקון; 24 February 1951 – 18 March 1983) was an Israeli actress.
