= Debbie (disambiguation) =

Debbie, also spelled Debby, is a feminine given name. It may also refer to:

== Songs ==
- "Debbie" by R. Stevie Moore from the album Everything You Always Wanted To Know About R. Stevie Moore But Were Afraid To Ask
- "Debbie," one of two new songs from the B-52s' 1998 compilation album Time Capsule: Songs for a Future Generation
- "Debbie", by Johnny Crawford from A Young Man's Fancy, 1962
- "Debbie", by Wale from Wow... That's Crazy, 2019
- Debbie, the character in the song "1985" by American rock band SR-71

== Other uses ==
- List of storms named Debbie
- List of storms named Debby
- "Debbie" (Brooklyn Nine-Nine episode), a 2020 television episode
- "Debbie" (Not Going Out), a 2011 television episode
