= Deborah Charles =

Saint Vincent and the Grenadines politician

Government senator
- In office 2015–2020

Personal details
- Party: Unity Labour Party

Deborah Charles is a Saint Kitts and Nevis politician. She was appointed as a senator in 2015.

== Career ==
She was appointed a government senator in the House of Assembly after the 2015 Saint Kitts and Nevis general election and Parliamentary Undersecretary in the Department for Education, National Reconciliation and Church Affairs. She is a member of the Unity Labour Party. In 2023, Charles was appointed Clerk of the House of Assembly.
