= Arthur H. Charles =

American politician

Arthur H. Charles (July 1, 1911 – August 4, 1999) was an American politician from Maine. Charles, a Republican from Portland, three terms in the Maine Legislature between 1955 – 1960. In 1954, he was elected to the Maine House of Representatives. In 1956 and 1958, he won election to the Maine Senate.

== Early life ==
Charles' parents left the Ottoman Empire in the late nineteenth-century with the assistance of the Woman's Christian Temperance Union and settled in Portland, Maine, where Charles was born in 1911. His father owned a grocery story and was at one time President of the Maine Grocers Association. Charles graduated from Portland High School before attending Hebron Academy for a post-graduation year. After Hebron, he was admitted to Boston University. However, he left BU after two years due to health difficulties and returned to Portland. He then enrolled at Portland College from which he earned a Bachelor in Business Administration.
