= Debra (disambiguation) =

Debra is a female given name.

It may also refer to:

== Places ==
- Debra (community development block), an administrative division in West Bengal, India
- Debra (Vidhan Sabha constituency), an assembly constituency in West Bengal
- Debra, Paschim Medinipur, a village in West Bengal, India
- Debra, Grenada – see List of cities in Grenada

== Other uses ==
- Tropical Storm Debra (disambiguation)
- Debra!, a Canadian children's television show, 2011-2012
- "Debra" (song), by the American artist Beck
- DEBRA, an international medical charity with national groups
- Diffuse extragalactic background radiation, in astronomy
- Debra Thana Sahid Kshudiram Smriti Mahavidyalaya, also known as Debra College, a college in West Bengal
