= List of Venezuelan artists =

This is a list of artists, in chronological and period order, who were born in Venezuela or whose artworks are closely associated with the country.

For a list of female artists, see List of Venezuelan women artists.

== 19th century Venezuelan artists ==
- Pedro Castillo (1790-1858), painter
- Juan Lovera (1776–1841)
- Carmelo Fernández (1809–1897), artist and painter
- Martín Tovar y Tovar (1827–1902)
- Eloy Palacios (1847–1919), artist, sculptor and painter
- Emilio Jacinto Mauri (1855–1908)
- Emilio Boggio (1857–1920)
- Antonio Herrera Toro (1857–1914)
- Cristóbal Rojas (1857–1890)
- Arturo Michelena (1863–1898)

== 20th century Venezuelan artists ==
- Federico Brandt (1878–1932)
- Tito Salas (1887–1974)
- Armando Reverón (1889–1954)
- Bárbaro Rivas (1893–1967)
- Manuel Cabré (1890–1984)
- Juan Félix Sánchez (1900–1997)
- Francisco Narvaez (1905–1982)
- Gertrude Goldschmidt "Gego" (1912–1994)
- Gerd Leufert (1914–1998)
- César Rengifo (1915–1980)
- Gabriel Bracho (1915–1995)
- Braulio Salazar (1917–2008)
- Mario Abreu (1919–1993)
- Alejandro Otero (1921–1990)
- Mercedes Pardo (1921–2005)
- Jesús Rafael Soto (1923–2005)
- Seka Severin de Tudja (1923–2007)
- Carlos Cruz-Díez (1924–2019)
- Narciso Debourg (b. 1925)
- Elsa Gramcko (1925–1994)
- Mateo Manaure (1926–2018)
- Oswaldo Vigas (1926–2014)
- Walter Arp (1927-2006)
- Pedro León Zapata (1928–2015)
- Mariano Díaz (photographer) (b. 1929)
- Marisol Escobar (1930–2016)
- Lía Bermúdez (b. 1930)
- Jacobo Borges (b. 1931)
- Juan Calzadilla (b. 1931)
- Gregorio Camacho (1933-2002)
- Juvenal Ravelo (b. 1934)
- Julio Maragall (b. 1936)
- Asdrubal Colmenarez (b. 1936)
- Francisco Hung (1937–2001)
- Harry Abend (1937–2021)
- Aimée Battistini (1916-1989)
- Alirio Palacios (1938–2015)
- Balthazar Armas (1941–2015)
- Paul del Rio (1943–2015)
- Jorge Blanco (b. 1945)
- Azalea Quiñones (b. 1951)
- Patricia Van Dalen (b. 1955)
- Arturo Herrera (b. 1959)
- María Rivas (1960-2019)

== Contemporary Venezuelan artists ==
- Julio Aguilera (b. 1961)
- José Antonio Hernández-Diez (b. 1964)
- Carla Arocha (b. 1961)
- Fernando Asián (b. 1951)
- Muu Blanco (b. 1966)
- Deborah Castillo (b. 1971)
- Beatriz Helena Ramos (b. 1971)
- Jaime Gili (b. 1972)
- Suwon Lee (b. 1977)
- Hermann Mejia (b. 1973)
- Yucef Merhi (b. 1977)
- Daniella Isamit Morales (b. 1982)
- Benjamin Garcia (b. 1986)
- Enrique Enn (b. 1995)
- Pancho Quilici (b. 1954)
- Roberto Mosquera A (b.1971)

== See also ==
- List of Venezuelans
- List of Latin American artists
