= List of Venezuelan women artists =

This is a list of women artists who were born in Venezuela or whose artworks are closely associated with that country.

== A ==
- Esther Alzaibar (1930–2022), ceramic artist
- Carla Arocha (born 1961), painter

== B ==
- Rafaela Baroni (1935–2021), sculptor and plastic artist
- Aimée Battistini (1916–1989), painter
- Lía Bermúdez (1930–2021), sculptor
- Valerie Brathwaite (c. 1938–2026)

== C ==
- Deborah Castillo (born 1971), performance artist

== E ==
- Patricia Esquivias (born 1979), Venezuelan-born Spanish video artist
- Marisol Escobar (1930–2016), Venezuelan-American sculptor

== F ==
- Magdalena Fernández (born 1964), installation and media artist

== G ==
- Gego (1912–1994), abstract painter, sculptor
- Elsa Gramcko (1925–1994), abstract painter, sculptor

== H ==
- Carolina Herrera (born 1939), fashion designer
- Luchita Hurtado (1920–2020), Venezuelan-American painter

== L ==
- Suwon Lee (born 1977), Korean-Venezuelan visual artist
- Diana López (born 1968), visual artist
- Martha Luna, fashion designer

== M ==
- Halyna Mazepa (1910–1995), Ukrainian-Venezuelan modern artist, illustrator, and ceramist
- Cristina Merchán (1927–1987), painter, ceramist
- Faride Mereb (born 1989), editor and graphic designer
- Daniella Isamit Morales (born 1982), performance artist
- Andreína Mujica (born 1970), photographer

== P ==
- Mercedes Pardo (1921–2005), painter, printmaker, collage artist

== Q ==
- Azalea Quiñones (born 1951), painter and plastic artist

== R ==
- Anrika Rupp (born 1956), artist
- Luisa Richter (1928–2015), German-Venezuelan graphic artist

== S ==
- Thea Segall (1929–2009), Romanian-Venezuelan photographer
- Seka Severin de Tudja (1923–2007), Yugoslavian-born Venezuelan ceramist
- Rayma Suprani (born 1969), cartoonist, activist
- Antonieta Sosa (born 1940), conceptual artist

== T ==
- Tecla Tofano (1927–1995), Italian-born Venezuelan ceramist, writer
- María Teresa Torras (1927–2009), Venezuelan-Spanish artist specializing in sculpture, textiles and metalwork

== V ==
- Patricia Van Dalen (born 1955), painter, visual artist

== Y ==
- Yeni and Nan (living), pair of performance and conceptual artists

== Z ==
- Geula Zylberman (born 1931), figurative painter
- Elisa Elvira Zuloaga (1900–1980), painter and engraver
- Maria Luisa Zuloaga de Tovar (1902–1992), ceramist
