= Milagros Maldonado =

Venezuelan visual art curator and collector (born 1944)

- Born: July 9, 1944 (age 82); Valencia, Carabobo, Venezuela
- Other name: Grande Dame des Arts
- Occupations: Cultural promoter Gallery owner Art advisor Visual arts collector and curator
- Children: Ricardo Degwitz Maldonado Alexander Degwitz Maldonado
- Parent(s): Iván Darío Maldonado Bello; Elsa Blaubach Horrocks
- Website: http://maldonadofamily.com/familia/

Milagros de las Mercedes Maldonado Blaubach (born July 9, 1944) is a cultural promoter, gallery owner, art advisor, visual art collector, and curator. She was the vice-president of the La Previsora Foundation, where she oversaw its associated art gallery and movie theatre. She is the founder and current president of the non-profit organization META Miami.

== Early years ==
Maldonado was born on July 9, 1944, in Valencia, Carabobo, Venezuela, to Elsa Blaubach Horrocks and Iván Darío Maldonado. Her father was a lawyer and businessman, while her paternal grandfather, Samuel Darío Maldonado, was a physician and writer active in Venezuelan public life. Maldonado has identified her family's background in literature and the arts as a primary influence on her career in cultural promotion.

== Career ==
After completing her early studies in Valencia, Blaubach moved to the United States, where she studied art at Saint Mary’s of Notre Dame High School in Indiana.

She returned to Venezuela and began her studies at the University of Carabobo, studying art history and painting. In 1969, she moved to Italy and graduated summa cum laude in art history from the Accademia di Belle Arti di Roma.

In 1972, she joined the Venice Biennale; around the same time, she began working as a co-producer of exhibitions, art installations, concerts, and dance-theatre shows at L'Attico, an avant-garde gallery in Rome led by Fabio Sargentini. Between 1972 and 1974, she served as the coordinator of the performance, music, and dance sections of the Great Contemporary Exhibition in Rome.

=== Work in Venezuela ===
In 1975, after establishing herself in Rome, Maldonado returned to Caracas. She was hired as an assistant to Luis García Morales, the president of CONAC (the National Council of Culture in Venezuela). In 1977, she became assistant to Gonzalo Castellano, the general director of the Museo de Bellas Artes, where she was responsible for coordinating programming and exhibitions. Maldonado's management consisted of transforming, in association with the National Cinematheque, the La Previsora Movie Theatre (Cine La Previsora) into an art film space dedicated to the screening of national and international films, art-independent and commercial cinema. In 2000, the theatre received the Municipal Award for Cinematographic Diffusion as the best movie theatre in the city.

By 1986, the Maldonado family, located in Caracas, was the majority shareholder of Seguros La Previsora. The La Previsora Art Gallery, created under the responsibility of Maldonado, constituted a new space for exhibitions of national and international artists. Maldonado served as the programmer, producer, and curator of the Gallery's shows until she left the position in 2009.

=== Exhibitions in Venezuela ===
==== Figuration/Fabulation (1990/2004) ====
On the 75th anniversary of the La Previsora insurance company, the La Previsora Foundation organised the exhibition Figuration/Fabulation: 75 Years of Painting in Latin America, with the participation of more than 100 Latin American artists in the Museum of Fine Arts in Caracas. Artists included Rufino Tamayo—who was featured on the cover of the catalog—Antonio Segui, Antonio Henrique Amaral, Julio Galán, Mario Abreu, Candido Portinari, Armando Reverón, Luis Caballero, Fernando Botero, Mario Carreño, Oswaldo Guayasamín, José Gamarra, Flavio de Carvalho, Ana Mercedes Hoyos, María Izquierdo, Wifredo Lam, Amelia Pélaez, Anita Malfatti, Diego Rivera, Frida Kahlo, Remedios Varo, Oswaldo Vigas, Jacobo Borges, Carlos Zerpa, and Roberto Matta. A booklet was published to accompany the exhibition with a prologue by author Gabriel García Márquez and reflections on the works written by curator Roberto Guevara.

==== Goya's Caprichos (2001) ====
The exhibition featured a series of Goya's original engravings, supported by the Spanish Ministry of Foreign Affairs, the European Union, and Cooperación Española.

==== Carlos Cruz-Diez (1992/2006) ====
To commemorate the 78th anniversary of La Previsora, Milagros Maldonado commissioned the artist and kineticist Carlos Cruz-Diez to redesign the main door of the company's headquarters. This piece, called Cromoestructura, remains in the building, thus integrating art into Venezuelan architecture. In 2006, the exhibition Cromosaturaciones y Cromo Interferencias was held, bringing together two emblematic works by the artist: a chromo-interference with moving projection and a chromo-saturation chamber.

==== The Sense of the Modern—Leo Matiz (2007) ====
In addition to covering the Mexican muralist movement and its protagonists, including Frida Kahlo, Leo Matiz's photography encompasses many of Latin America's scenarios and characters. Curated by José Antonio Navarrete, the exhibition focused on the beginning of modernity in architecture in Latin America, with examples including the Universidad Central de Venezuela, a world cultural heritage site.

==== Walter Arp… Rara Avis (2008) ====
This exhibition reviewed the body of work on Venezuelan birds, developed by painter and ecologist Walter Arp for over fifty years. Milagros Maldonado was the leading promoter of this event due to her admiration and respect for the artist's ornithological research, which was not well known. The exhibition included more than sixty paintings that were exhibited along with photographs, interactive applications, and videos that reflected the vast number of Venezuelan birds, their respective behaviors, and physiognomy. The exhibition was accompanied by a publication about the life and work of Walter Arp by his curator Sergio Antillano Armas, with a prologue by the Venezuelan poet Eugenio Montejo.

==== Pancho Quilici: Tras Caracas (2009) ====
The Tras Caracas exhibition consisted of more than fifty paintings, installations, and videos in the spaces of La Previsora Art Gallery. In it, the painter Pancho Quilici presented work informed by research with photos, documents, and plans of the city of Caracas that the exhibition curators provided. At the time, Caracas was experiencing the concerns of urban growth, and Milagros Maldonado proposed dialogue with the artist to generate a meeting point for perception and reflection on Caracas. Quilici combined his memories of the capital with a vision of nostalgia and futurism, with forms including incomplete buildings, labyrinths, and semi-transparent geometric forms.

=== Work in Miami ===
By the time Maldonado left La Previsora Foundation in 2009, she had assembled an extensive art collection that included artists such as Wifredo Lam, Roberto Matta, Fernando Botero, Antonio Seguí, José Gamarra, Luis Caballero, Ramón Alejandro, Gerardo Chávez, Agustín Cárdenas, Pancho Quilici, Armando Morales, and Jacobo Borges and Armando Reverón. This collection inspired the exhibition, Beyond the Erotic (2010), curated by José Antonio Navarrete, which included a series of lectures and educational activities.

After moving to Miami and having gained experience in New York with exhibitions in alternative art galleries, she founded a new cultural space in Wynwood, which was motivated by the artistic boom that the city was experiencing.

==== Miami Biennale / Maldonado Education through Art (META Miami) ====
Maldonado started working at Miami Biennale in 2010 and continued for eight years, during which she curated and produced numerous exhibitions, as well as musical and educational events.

The main objective of this non-profit organization is to promote creative dialogue between Miami, its diverse cultural communities, and the rest of the world through multicultural projects. These include national and international art exhibitions, musical presentations, lectures, film screenings, book presentations, workshops, fairs, and festivals.

Relevant activities
Year	Type	Title	Notes
2010	Exhibition	Beyond the Erotic	Featured Maldonado's private art collection curated by José Antonio Navarrete
2010	Exhibition	Leo Matiz, The Expanded Eye	
2011	Exhibition	Convergence Paris. José Gamarra, Atelier Morales, Ramón Alejandro, and Panho Quilici	
2012	Exhibition	Exhaling Gnosis	Michele Oka Doner's first solo exhibition in Miami
	Event	Piano Fest, Music Meets Painting	
2013	Project	Wynwood Ways Cruz-Diez Intersection	Wynwood's first color intersection is dedicated to Tony Goldman
2015	Exhibition	ILLUMINATIONS: An illuminating exhibition	James Turrell's piece Coconino
2017	Exhibition	Proposals on color, rhythm, and light, Waldo Balart	
2017	Exhibition	Beware of Red	
2018	Exhibition	Horacio Zabala, Isolations	
2018	Exhibition and auction	ARTTION, Acción Solidaria a Beneficio de Venezuela	An auction of art for people living with HIV, and to get medical supplies for Venezuela
2018	Workshop	Empowerment through Art.	Conducted by Patricia Van Dalen and Creativo Dance Studio, in collaboration with The Miami Biennial, Merrill Lynch, Rotary Club Brickell, and Miami Women's Club.
2018	Exhibition	Solid Abstraction. Strategies of Disobedience in Cuban Art	
2019	Exhibition	Mercedes Elena Gonzalez at Pinta Miami	
2020	Exhibition	Esvin Alarcón Lam, Inverted Histories	First solo exhibition in Miami by the Guatemalan artist
2021	Exhibition	Warheads by Mercedes Elena González	To benefit the organization Acción Solidaria
2022			Homage to Venezuelan poet and essayist Rafael Cadenas, a celebration of his life, organized by Rolando Peña
2025	Exhibition	Feminine Ecology by Mercedes E. González & Valerie Brathwaite	

== Film career ==
In 1986, Maldonado starred in a film version of Doña Bárbara by Rómulo Gallegos. The filming occurred on Hato El Frio's family ranch, but was unfinished due to a conflict between the leading actor and the producers.

The director Diego Rísquez cast Milagros Maldonado to play La Malinche, the Nahua woman who collaborated with Hernán Cortés in the conquest of Mexico, in his 1988 film Amerika, Terra Incognita.

During her tenure as director of La Previsora Art Gallery, Milagros Maldonado promoted the making of several documentaries: La Vida en Color de Carlos Cruz Diez (2005) in co-production with Bolívar Films; Leo Matiz, El Sentido de lo Moderno (2007), with the collaboration of Cuban photography curator and critic José Antonio Navarrete; and to accompany the 2008 Walter Arp exhibition, the Foundation collaborated with the television network Vale TV to create a documentary about the artist's research on Venezuelan birds.
