= Alirio =

Alirio or Alírio is a given name of uncertain origin, perhaps from a popular form of Latin Hilarius. Notable people with this name include:

- Alirio Barrera (born 1976), Colombian politician
- Alirio Díaz (1923–2016), Venezuelan classical guitarist and composer
- Alirio García Flamenco, Salvadoran military officer
- Alirio Palacios (1938–2015), Venezuelan visual artist
- Alírio Rodrigues, Portuguese chemical engineer
- Alirio Rodríguez (1934–2018), Venezuelan painter and visual artist
- Alirio Ugarte Pelayo (1923–1966), Venezuelan politician, journalist, diplomat and lawyer
- Alirio Uribe Muñoz (born 1960), Colombian lawyer and politician
- José Alirio Carrasco (born 1976), Colombian long-distance runner
- José Alirio Contreras (born 1978), Venezuelan professional racing cyclist
