= María Evelia Marmolejo =

Colombian artist (born 1958)

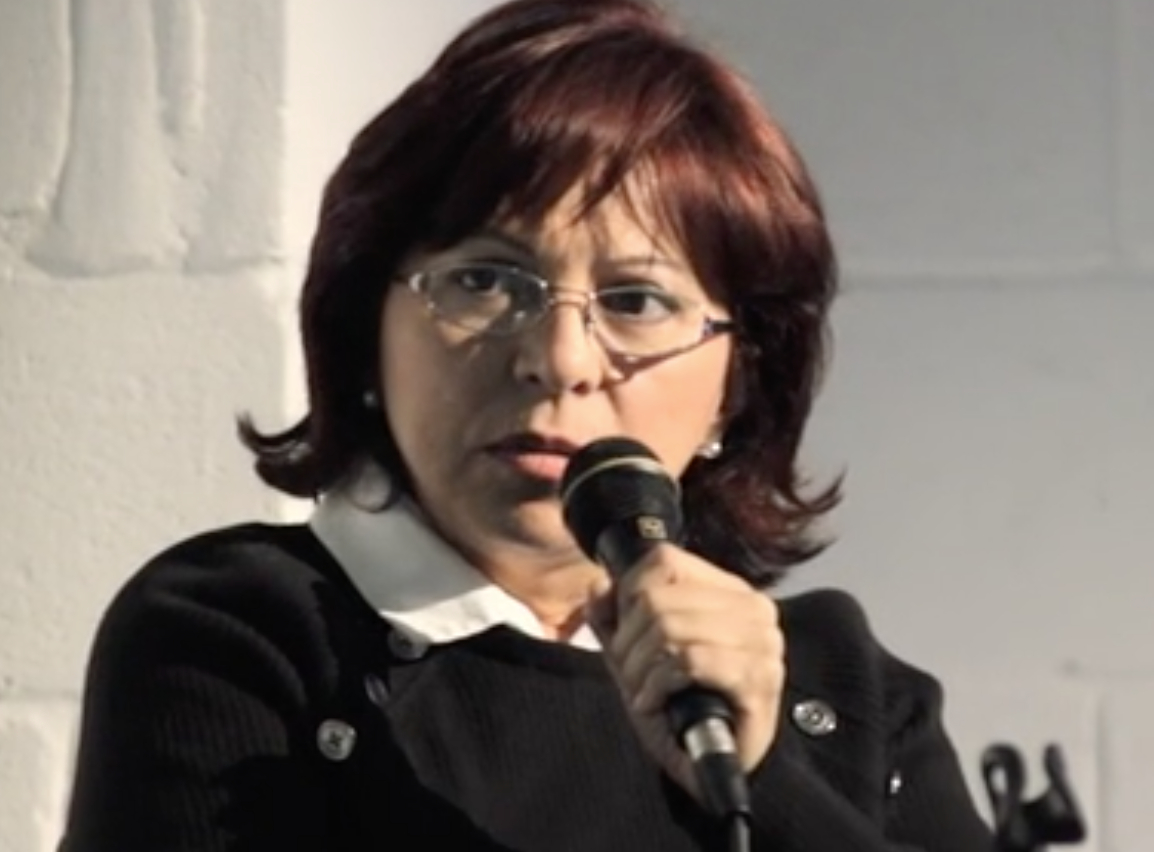
- Colombian Performance artist Maria Evelia Marmolejo speaking about her artworks in 2013
- Born: 1958 (age 67–68); Pradera, Colombia
- Known for: performance art, feminist art

María Evelia Marmolejo (born 1958) is a Colombian radical feminist performance artist, later based in Madrid and New York City. She is credited by the Colombian scholar María Lovino with staging the first work of feminist performance art in Colombia, in 1981. She is best known for discussing controversial themes such as political oppression, feminism, environment, and socioeconomic issues within her performances.

== Early life ==
Marmolejo was born in Pradera, Colombia, in 1958. Raised in a Catholic family with four brothers, from an early age she became displeased with the idea of machismo and her inferior role in a male-dominated society, which led her to express this frustration in future artworks such as "Tendidos". As a child she took part in neighborhood theater classes and also participated in a theater workshop in art school, both largely influencing her passion for performing. She found performance art suitable for her as it gave her an outlet to express her anger and distress towards her country's political turmoil at the time, as well as her own struggles with being a woman.

== Education ==
=== Art student: Universidad de Santiago de Cali (1978-80) ===
María Evelia Marmolejo studied art and obtained her B.F.A at La Universidad de Santiago de Cali, in Cali, Colombia, from 1978 to 1980, after realizing in previous years that studying law was not something that interested her. Here, she created her first installation for her final exam in 1979 titled "Tendidos", where she hung both used and unused pads from a clothing rack, which was hanging from a butchers hook. This was her first use of blood, which she would go on to use in other works to speak on the violence going on in her country. The piece as a whole was meant to protest the rape and torture of Colombian women by the Colombian army. During her final drawing test at the school, she cut her index finger and used her blood to draw a line on posters, illustrating how Colombia's political violence was continuous, but not a straight line, and also expressing her belief that a drawing did not have to be made out of the traditional paper and pencil. Consequently, she was failed out of art school when her professors did not accept either of the works. Once Marmolejo left art school, she decided to concentrate on performance art, having been inspired by artists including Lygia Clark, Yeni and Nan, and Carlos Zerpa.

=== Masters and other education ===
Marmolejo also studied video and television at the Centro de Estudios de la Imagen in Madrid, Spain in 1986. Furthermore, she went on to obtain her Master of the Arts and Humanities from The City University of New York in New York, New York in 2008.

== Artwork ==
Marmolejo's works deal with themes of gender, colonialism, and political oppression in Colombia. Her first performances span the years 1981-1985, after which there was an almost thirty-year period during which she rarely performed; she became publicly active again in 2013. She has staged her performances at major institutions such as the Museum of Modern Art of Bogota, Museum of Modern Art Cartagena, and the Contemporary Art Museum Guayaquil, as well as in more secluded sites. Her performances in the 1980s often included bodily fluids and infliction of injury to herself, in works responsive to political oppression in Colombia, the social conditions of women, the political context of women's bodies, and environmental issues.

Marmolejo self-exiled to Madrid in 1985. She is currently based in New York City.

== Main production period: 1981-85 ==
=== Anonimo-1981 ===
Marmolejo produced the majority of her performance art pieces between 1981 and 1985. Her first performance titled "Anonimo 1" (Anonymous 1) took place in 1981 at the Plazoleta del Centro Administrativo Municipal in Cali, Colombia. "Anonimo 1" was a performance in recognition of the various innocent Colombian people that had suffered under the regime of the Colombian president at the time, Julio Cesar Turbay Ayala (1978–82). The first part of the performance consisted of Marmolejo creating a walkway from a white paper and then proceeding to cutting her own feet and walking over the paper, while leaving blood stains. In order to remain anonymous, she wore a white tunic, cap, and bandages over her face. In the second part, Marmolejo cured her self-inflicted lesions and then continued to walk over the paper with bandaged feet until the twenty minutes that she had planned for the performance were up. Maria Evelia Marmolejo intended to shock spectators into paying attention to the violence around them, to confront the various disappearances and murders, and to convince them of the great need to heal the pain that this violence had caused."Anonimo 1" also marked the beginning of her often utilizing self-harm as a technique to express herself in her performances and easily capture the attention of her audiences.

=== 11 de Marzo-1982 ===
In 1982 Marmolejo produced her most famous and also most controversial performance titled "11 de Marzo." She performed it at the Galeria San Diego, in Bogota, Colombia. The performance consisted of her inducing her period, and was meant to celebrate it as a natural part of life rather than something to be ashamed of. Marmolejo arranged paper on the floor in an L shape and walked naked over it so that her blood would drip on it, all while playing flushing sounds in the background. The majority of her body was covered in pads, and she also danced while rubbing her pubic area against the paper and the walls. This performance was a way for her to express a part of her that had always been looked down upon by society, as well as a way to free herself and finally accept the natural functions of her body. It was seen as very rebellious as she turned a part of womanhood that was traditionally seen as a weakness, and an attribute contributing to a woman's presumed inferiority, and turned it into a strength.

=== Anonimo 3 and 4-1982 ===
Marmolejo also produced "Anonimo 3", which spoke on the need to focus on the environment. This was a private 15-minute performance that occurred near the Cauca River in Colombia, meant as a sort of apology for all of the pollution that humanity had created on earth, as was represented by the river. In this performance, Marmolejo covered herself in gauze and performed a healing ritual where she gave herself a vaginal washing meant to fertilize the ground and get rid of the pollution.

"Anonimo 4" was produced the same year. In a similar way to "Anonimo 3", it was a private performance that also took place by the Cauca River. In this presentation, she collected multiple placentas from nearby hospitals and placed them in a triangle that she dug in the ground. She then hung some placentas from her body using plastic strips and stood inside the triangle. This performance was effective in provoking people in the audience to both cry and vomit, as the smell of the placentas was so strong. The piece meant to emphasize the idea that being born into a world where one had to fight to survive was terrifying for many, including herself.

=== América-1985 ===
Marmolejo became pregnant in 1985 and decided to exile herself to Madrid, Spain. The artist became aware that the Spanish would be celebrating 500 years of the discovery of the Americas, which led her to provide her point of view and protest the celebration through another performance titled "América." "América" took place on October 12, 1985, at the Plaza Colon in Madrid. Through the performance, Marmolejo expressed her belief that they should not be celebrating, but instead lamenting that day because the discovery of the Americas also marked the beginning of colonialism. At 12:00 noon the artist began distributing copies she had taken of Fray Bartolomé de la Casas' book, "Breve Destrucción de las Indias". She used some of the most tragic and graphic descriptions of conquest that de la Casas had described in his book as an attempt to convince people of the horrors of colonialism. She then proceeded to cutting her own fingers and using her blood to write the word "América" on the Christopher Columbus statue located in the plaza. The performance resulted in strong reactions from the public, with some people yelling at her to go back to her own country, and others yelling that she had the right to speak up because Spain was a free country. She then broke a large mirror and distributed the shattered pieces to the public, and shortly after was arrested. She was in jail for a few hours for possession of a weapon (the knife she used to cut herself), but was shortly released.

=== Sesquilé-1985 ===
Marmolejo decided to turn the birth of her son into another one of her artworks. The artist gave birth to her son on December 5, 1985, at the Hospital Anglo-Americano in Madrid. She chose to invite a photographer as well as various spectators to observe her giving birth to her son, whom she would give the same name as the performance, Sesquilé. Through "Sesquilé", Marmolejo wanted to juxtapose what it meant to be an artist and what it meant to be a creator of life. She believed that the process of creating as an artist was very similar to giving birth in that giving birth was in a sense a creation of a new life. Because at the time the artist believed that the concept of a God fed into the patriarchy and therefore considered herself an atheist, she considered herself her own God.

=== Major works ===
- Anónimos 1, 2, 3, y 4, 1981-82.
- 11 de Marzo, 1981.
- Residuos I, 1983.
- Residuous II, 1984.
- América, 1985.
- Sesquilé, 1985.
- Extractivismo, 2015.

== Exhibitions ==
The following is a list of Maria Evelia Marmolejo's art exhibitions including her performances.

- Plaza del Centro Administración Municipal de Cali. Cali, Colombia. (1981)
- Museo de Arte Moderno De Cartagena. Cartagena, Colombia. (1983, 1982)
- Performance/installation: XXIX Salón Nacional de Artes Visuales. Pasto, Colombia. (1984)
- Performance: Museo de Arte Contemporáneo y Pinacoteca. Guayaquil, Ecuador. (1984)
- Performance: Plaza Colón. Madrid, Spain. (1985)
- Performance. Anglo-American Hospital. Madrid, Spain. (1985).
- Performance/installation: 3a Bienal de Arte de Bogotá. Bogotá, Colombia. (1992)
- re.act.feminism – a performing archive at Centro Cultural Montehermoso Kulturunea, Vitoria Gasteiz, Spain (2011)
- Performance:“May 1st 1981- February 1st, 2013” Mandragoras Art Space (MAAS). Long Island City, New York. (2013)
- 19 Bienal de Arte Paiz. Lake Atitlan, Guatemala City, Guatemala. (2014)
- Engagement/Healing: “Extractivismo”, Milan, Italy. (2015)
- Grants & Commissions Program Exhibition: “Conciencia Dopada”, 2016. Performance. Liquid Sensibilities, CIFO – Cisneros Fontanals Art Foundation. Miami, Florida. (2016)
- Subverting the Feminine: Latin American (Re)Marks on the Female Body. Y Gallery (New York, NY). (2016-2017)
- The Political Body: Radical Women in Latin American Art: 1960-1985- Hammer Museum, Los Angeles, CA (2017)

== Honors and awards ==
- Grants & Commissions Program Award (Achievement Award). CIFO – Cisneros Fontanals Art Foundation. Miami, Florida. (2016).

== Collections and present day ==
María Evelia Marmolejo's performance pieces can be found eternalized by various videos and photographs that can be found at the Prometeo Gallery in Milan, Italy, the Brooklyn Museum in Brooklyn, New York, the Museo de Arte Moderno de Bogota in Bogota, Colombia, and the Instituto de Vision also in Bogota. Marmolejo continues to reside in New York and continues to create pieces that aim to connect past issues with the present and analyze what has changed over the years.
