= Will Rawls =

American performer

- Awards: 2026 Ruth Foundation for the Arts; 2015 Foundation for Contemporary Arts Grants to Artists Award; 2014 Process Space Residency, Lower Manhattan Cultural Council; 2013 MacDowell Colony Fellowship; 2012 Harlem Stage Fund for New Work; 2010 2011 Mount Tremper Arts Residency and Performance; 2009 2010 Studio Series Residency, Dance Theater Workshop; 2008 New York Times, Best Performers of the Year; 2008 danceWEB Europe Scholarship to ImPulsTanz Festival; 2000 Class Speaker Elect at Williams College Commencement Exercises; 2000 Dewey Prize for Public Speaking at Commencement Exercises; 2000 Williams College Hubbard Hutchinson Fellowship in the Arts

Will Rawls is an American contemporary choreographer, performance artist, curator and writer based in New York City and with continuing projects in Europe. He has choreographed solo works and group works, and has danced professionally with established dance companies. He is also one half of the performance art collaborative Dance Gang, with Kennis Hawkins.

In 2017, Rawls collaborated with poet and writer Claudia Rankine on What Remains. Rawls and Rankine began to generate What Remains together after being recommended as collaborators by a mutual friend. Rawls entered the studio with two of Rankine's works – 2004's Don't Let Me Be Lonely and 2014's Citizen. The work included four performers: Tara Aisha Willis, Jessica Pretty, Leslie Cuyjet, and Jeremy Toussaint-Baptiste. Toussaint-Baptiste was also sound designer for What Remains. In the program for the Museum of Contemporary Art (MCA) in Chicago, Tara Aisha Willis (performer and Associate Curator of Performance for the MCA) described the work as: "In making What Remains, we are trying to imagine the state of being both living and already slated for death as a habitable place, a vast void or tundra where we use our voices and bodies to call ourselves into existence. It may be the 'already-dead' space, but it is ours, or at least a space where we are already accustomed to its particular discomforts." What Remains premiered at Bard College, and has been performed at national venues, including Danspace in New York, the Walker Art Center, Yale Repertory Theatre, and, in December 2018, Chicago's Museum of Contemporary Art Warehouse Space.

== Selected shows ==
- "The Planet Eaters." The Chocolate Factory, with musician Chris Kuklis.
- "A folk tale, or some thoughts on dancing in the dark." A reading/performance at the Emily Harvey Foundation.
- "Folk You! Folk Me Too!," a lecture performance on folklore at Tanzquartier Wien.
- "Frontispieces." Danspace Project

== Writings ==
- "Leap of Fake" an essay on dance and doubt by Will Rawls in 'SCORES N°4: on addressing' the biannual publication of Austria's Tanzquartiers, a think tank, residency space and presenter for contemporary dance.
- "Dispatch from documenta (13): Will Rawls in Conversation with Thomas J. Lax" from The Studio Museum of Harlem
- "Lindsay Benedict in conversation with Will Rawls" in Critical Correspondence.
- "Megan Byrne, Michael Mahalchick, Will Rawls, and Regina Rocke in conversation with Levi Gonzalez" in Critical Correspondence.
- "Milka Djordjevich, NohemÃ Montzerrat Contreras, Sarah Beth Percival, Will Rawls, and Otto Ramstad in conversation with Alejandra Martorell" in Critical Correspondence.

Will Rawls is currently the co-editor with Abigail Levine at Critical Correspondence, a web publication of the Center for Movement Research.

== Performed with ==
- Shen Wei Dance Arts, as a dancer in "The Rite of Spring" for the Venice Biennale and in "Connect. Transfer.," at Lincoln Center Festival.
- Nicholas Leichter Dance, as a dancer in "Free the Angels" at Joyce Theatre.
- Tino Sehgal, as a dancer and interpreter for "This Progress," performed at the Guggenheim Museum and "This Variation" performed at documenta (13) in Kassel, Germany.
- Marina Abramović as a re-performer in "The Artist Is Present" at the Museum of Modern Art.
- Jérôme Bel, as a dancer in "The Show Must Go On" performed at the Museum of Modern Art.
- Alain Buffard, as a dancer for "Baron Samedi" toured in Europe and the USA.
- Noemie LaFrance, a dancer in Agora at McCarren Pool in Brooklyn, NY.
- Davide Balula, as a dancer in "The Endless Pace" for Performa 09.

== Curatorial ==
- "Roll Call" Movement Research Festival 2009
- "The Protagonists and Coining", video screenings and essays on black performance, postmodern dance and YouTube serials

== Collaboration ==
Dance Gang is an American performance art duo made up of Will Rawls and Kennis Hawkins started in 2006 in New York City.

The two, both over six feet tall, met in 2004 as fellow dancers in Shen Wei Dance Arts and then started their own project. Dance Gang began with playful dance interventions in public spaces and then continued into short and full-length site-specific choreographed works. They performed an hour-long site-specific work, "Dog Free" in the River to River Festival in 2009, shorter works with Neal Medlyn, a performance to Beyoncé's 'All the Single Ladies' at Joe's Pub, and to Kanye West's "Bad News" track from 808 and Heartbreaks, a work at the Ise Cultural Foundation as part of "In Pursuit: Art on Dating," and others.

In 2018 and 2019, Rawls collaborated with choreographer Andros Zins-Browne on two performances. The first was The Tony Cokes Remixes for the 10th Berlin Biennial. The following year the two collaborated on making a new version of Simone Forti's 1960 performance See-Saw, commissioned by the Museum of Modern Art in New York City and performed by the two as well as performer Martita Abril.
