= Muu Blanco =

Venezuelan artist (born 1966)

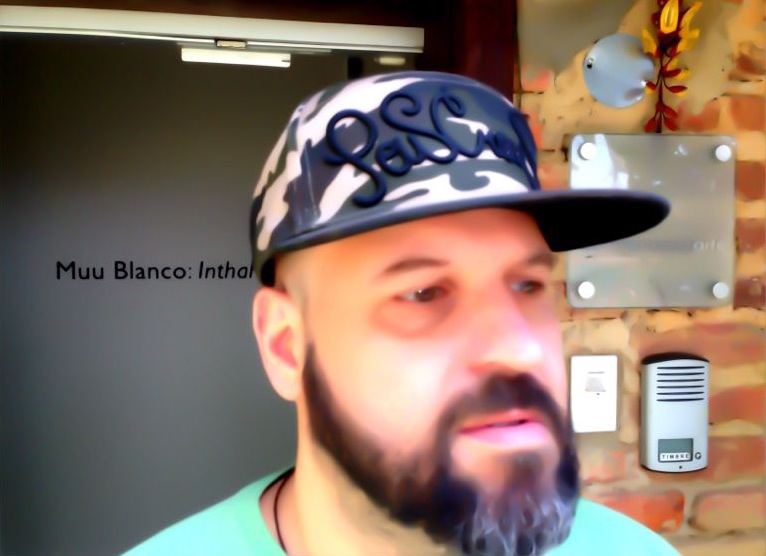
- Muu Blanco at Carmen Araujo Arte Gallery
- Born: 16 August 1966 (age 60); Caracas, Venezuela
- Occupations: Venezuelan artist
- Movement: Contemporary art, Postmodernism

Muu Blanco (born 16 August 1966) is a multidisciplinary Venezuelan artist. He works in the plastic arts, performance, drawing, photography, electronic music, conceptual video, and handbag design. His compositions have been presented locally as well as internationally, including in cities like: New York City, Berlin, Miami, Barcelona, Bogotá, Buenos Aires, London, Vancouver and Milan. His work has been regarded as a criticism to power, wealth and narcissism, as well as commentary on the urban landscape of modern Caracas.

His works are part of international public collections as the Patricia Phelps de Cisneros Foundation collection, Fundación para la Cultura Urbana, Banco Mercantil collection; and private collections in Los Angeles, San Francisco, Milan, New York, Houston, Bogotá, Buenos Aires, Mexico, Porto Alegre, Madrid, Lisbon, Barcelona, Madrid, Caracas and Maracaibo.

He is also known as DJ Muu or Dr. Muusica for his musical work and career with sound art experiences.

== Education ==
José Antonio "Muu" Blanco Angulo was born in 1966 in Caracas, Venezuela. Between 1989 and 1990, he studied painting and the history of art at the Museum of Fine Arts and the Federico Brandt Institute at Caracas.

In 1994, he achieved a special mention in the V National Award of Guayana Art.

In 1996, he took a course of project management of visual arts at the Fundación Polar. In 2002, he graduated from the Instituto Universitario de Estudios Superiores de Artes Plásticas Armando Reverón (IUESAPAR) with a Master's degree in Practice and Criticism of Contemporary Representation Systems.

== Work ==
In 2007 he had an exhibition, Bello Horizonte, at the Cultural Center of Chacao that incorporated images, sound and video to show contemporaneous landscape as a multimedia object. This expo also included sculptures from his Modernismo Anacrónico (Anachronistic Modernism) (2002), made from remains of toys and recycled objects.

In 2009, together with Robert Lippok, Blanco showcased Paisaje Sonoro Caracas-Berlín at Sala Mendoza, Caracas, composed mostly of abstract compositions made from sound recordings from the streets of Caracas and Berlin.

Other collections of Blanco's work included:

- Caja Blanca Atrapa Moscas, Sicart Gallery (Barcelona, Spain, 2012)
- Entorno, Cubo 7 Gallery (Caracas, 2012)
- Inthahouse, Carmen Araujo Arte (Caracas, 2013).

In 2014, he worked on Black Point at Mandragoras Art Space New York and Futebol o Jogo só acaba quando termina with the Goethe-Institut throughout Latin America. The first is a multimedia performance related to the 2014 Venezuelan protests. Futebol is a display colorful and appealing pictures that were adapted from images of acts of violence, usually related to soccer games.

== Publications ==
=== Catalogs ===
- Blanco, Muu (2007), Exposición No.17: Bello Horizonte (in Spanish), Venezuela: Centro Cultural Chacao.
- Sala Mendoza (2010), Paisaje sonoro: Caracas-Berlín (In Spanich), Venezuela: Goethe-Institut, Sala Mendoza, A-Musik and Faría+Fábregas Gallery, Legal deposit FD2522009650.
- Suazo, Félix (2014), Panorámica Arte Emergente en Venezuela 2000/2012 (in Spanish), Venezuela: Fundación Telefónica.
- Hug, Alfons (2013), Futebol o Jogo só acaba quando termina (in Portuguese), Rio de Janeiro, Brazil: Goethe-Institute, ISBN 978-980-7212-35-9

=== Discography ===
- Hermanos Monteverde and DJ Muu, Pillo’s Caracas Boy, 2001, Imagines Recordings.
- Jaba-lee Proyect (pseudonym), CSS–66–live, 2005.

== Exhibitions ==
Since 1990 Blanco has participated in numerous group exhibitions in various areas of Latin America, USA, Europe and Canada.

=== Solo shows ===
- 2008, Anachronistic Modernism, Barcelona, Spain.
- 2007, Bello Horizonte, Caracas, Venezuela.
- 2010, Fósiles Analíticos, Fernando Zubillaga Gallery, Caracas, Venezuela.
- 2012, Caixa Blanca Atrapa Mosques, Galeria Sicart, Vilafranca del Penedes, Spain.
- 2013, Inthahouse, Carmen Araujo Arte, Caracas, Venezuela.
- 2017, Black Point, New York, USA.
- 2018, A Time. Mirage Garage Camp, BurningMan Festival, Black Rock City. Nevada, USA.
- 2019, Calle Sin Salida (Dead End), GBG ARTS Miami, Art Palm Beach, Miami, USA.

=== Group Shows ===
- 1994, Técnicas Mixtas, Alternativa Gallery, Caracas, Venezuela.
- 1995, II Salón Pirelli of Young Artists, Contemporary Art Museum of Caracas Sofía Imber, Venezuela.
- 1998, Longitud de onda: Videos y fotografías, Alejandro Otero Museum, Caracas, Venezuela.
- 2000, Demostraionraume / A Case Study, Or Gallery, Vancouver, Canada.
- 2000, 90 60 90, Goethe–Institut and Jacobo Borges Museum, Caracas, Venezuela.
- 2001, ENE Incidentes — RE incidentes / Entre milenios, Center of Beu Arts, Maracaibo, Venezuela.
- 2002, Cubo Blanco a la Caja Negra: tapes históricos, videos creativos, arte digital, video, escultura venezolana, Contemporary Art Museum of Caracas Sofía Ímber, Venezuela.
- 2003, Contra / Sentido. New Venezuelan Photography, Sala Mendoza, Caracas, Venezuela.
- 2004, El Barril: Estética del Petróleo, Goethe–Institut and Jacobo Borges Museum, Caracas, Venezuela.
- 2005, Diálogos, Museo Nacional de Bellas Artes, Santiago, Chile.
- 2006, Diálogos, Contemporary Art Museum of Costa Rica, San José, Costa Rica.
- 2006, Ambulantes, Jacobo Borges Museum, Caracas, Venezuela.
- 2006, Don’t Trust. Wight Biennial, Anxiety of influence, UCLA New Wight Gallery Eli & Edyth Broad Art Center, Los Angeles, EEUU.
- 2006, Happily Ever After… Hardcore, Art Contemporary Space, Miami, EEUU.
- 2007, AAA, Modernidad y Anacronismo, Núcleo Oramas, Zona VI Bienal de Mercosur, Porto Alegre, Brazil.
- 2008, Reflection & Refraction, Rich Gallery, London, England.
- 2008, D’eros I Thanatos, Sicart Gallery, Barcelona, Spain.
- 2008, Geografias (In)visibles, Arte Contemporáneo Latinoamericano Centro León, Dominican Republic.
- 2009, Openart, Centro de la Historia del Arte de Zaragoza, Spain.
- 2010, Paisaje sonoro: Caracas – Berlín, Sala Mendoza in association with A-Musik and Faría-Fábregas Gallery, Caracas, Venezuela.
- 2010, Polimorfo(s) Perverso(s), Fernando Pradilla gallery, Madrid, Spain.
- 2010, Didácticas, Periférico Caracas Arte Contemporáneo, Caracas, Venezuela.
- 2011, Arqueologia de la galería, Galeria Sicart, Barcelona, Spain.
- 2011, Geometrías Alteradas: Doce discursos visuales, Faría+Fabregas Gallery, Caracas, Venezuela.
- 2012, El Quinquenio, La Caja, Chacao Cultural Center, Caracas, Venezuela.
- 2012, About Change, The World Bank Art Program Washington DC, EEUU.
- 2013, Arte Contemporáneo Venezolano, LEME gallery, São Paulo, Brazil.
- 2013, Futebol o Jogo só acaba quando termina, Goethe Institute, Rio de Janeiro, Brazil.
- 2019, Political Aesthetics, GBG ARTS Miami, Miami, EEUU.
