= Dance Gang =

Dance Gang is an American performance art duo made up of Will Rawls and Kennis Hawkins started in 2006 in New York City.

== About ==
The two, both over six feet tall, met in 2004 as fellow dancers in Shen Wei Dance Arts and then started their own project. Dance Gang began with playful dance interventions in public spaces and then continued into short and full-length site-specific choreographed works.

== Selected performances ==
They performed an hour-long site-specific work, "Dog Free" in the River to River Festival in New York City in 2009, "Dog Breaks" at Dance Theatre Workshop, some interventions into the artworks of Tino Sehgal, Pierre Huyghe, Cevdet Erek and Ryan Gander during Documenta (13), in Kassel, Germany, shorter works for projects by Neal Medlyn: a performance to Beyoncé's 'All the Single Ladies' at Joe's Pub, and a dance to Kanye West's "Bad News" track from 808 and Heartbreaks, also a work at the Ise Cultural Foundation as part of "In Pursuit: Art on Dating," and others.
