= National Prize of Plastic Arts of Venezuela =

National Prize of Plastic Arts of Venezuela is an annual award given to various artists from that country, specifically the field of drawing, printmaking and drawing pictorial. It is one of the National Culture Awards.

The reward is delivered continuously since 1947. In 1952 awarding paused for about 19 years, resumed in 1971. The granting is made on an annual basis since its first edition until 2001, when it turned biennial. An exception to this rule was 2003, when it waited three years to give the next award, and then return to biennial delivery.

== List of Winners ==
National Prize of Plastic Arts of Venezuela
Years	Artist	Image
1947	Mateo Manaure	
1948	Carlos González Bogen	
1949	Juan Vicente Fabbiani	
1950	Ramón Vásquez Brito	
1951	Alirio Oramas	
1952	Oswaldo Vigas	
1953–1970	No se entregó	
1971	Carlos Cruz Diez	
1972	Omar Carreño	
1973	Manuel Quintana Castillo	
1974	Carlos Otero	
1975	Mario Abreu	
1976	Braulio Salazar	
1977	Alirio Palacios	
1978	Mercedes Pardo	
1979	Gego	
1980	Pedro León Zapata	
1981	Luisa Richter	
1982	Luis Domínguez Salazar	
1983	Marisol Escobar	
1984	Jesús Soto	
1985	Héctor Poleo	
1986	Manuel Espinoza	
1987	Sofía Imber	
1988	Juan Félix Sánchez	
1989	Gerd Leufert	
1990	Miguel Von Dangel	
1991	Nelson Garrido	
1992	Miguel Arroyo	
1993	Nedo Mion Ferrario	
1994	Gabriel Bracho	
1995	Claudio Perna	
1996	Juan Calzadilla	
1997	Diego Barboza	
1998	Édgar Sánchez	
1999	Víctor Hugo Irazábal	
2000	María Antonieta Sosa	
2001	Santiago Pol	
2003	Ender Cepeda	
2006	Lía Bermúdez	
2008	Juvenal Ravelo	
2010	Azalea Quiñones	
2012	José Antonio Dávila	
