= Lindsay Benedict =

American artist

- Born: New York, United States
- Education: Williams College, UC Berkeley, Whitney Museum of American Art’s Independent Study Program
- Website: https://hyperallergic.com/author/lindsay-l-benedict/

Lindsay Benedict is an artist living in New York City who works in Super 8 and 16mm film, performance, sound, text and painting. Her works explore cultural boundaries through intimate relationships. She is also an adjunct professor in the Fine Arts department at Parsons, The New School in New York City.

== Selected works and exhibitions ==
Carrying (you) at ZARATAN Arte Contemporanea in Lisbon, Portugal was an open studio presentation about the grief of heartbreak and a maternal transformation. The artist works with drips of water on paper and in an audio document, a process that is slow and accumulative. Carrying (you) was accompanied by an audio field soundtrack entitled 9 months of slow drops and public presentations such as an artist talk and a live DJ set (during COVID-19), entitled Ciclo ÑDjs #97: 1-cent black on magenta.

How to Dance a group exhibition at BronxArtSpace in New York City with collaborator Julia Brown. Curated by Phyllis Rosenzweig, the exhibition plays with movement, gesture and discipline in document and plan; it also includes artists Mark Bradford, Klara Liden, and Glendalys Medina.

KINDREDS: a song about animals performed at Danspace with Letitia Spangler. The work celebrates ‘play’ and emotional wisdom while pushing deeper into concepts of intimacy and co-dependency. Lindsay Benedict and Letitia Spangler sought out behaviors that are present in both humans and animals.

dirty domestic a solo exhibition at Martina Johnston gallery in the Bay Area of California in which the artist shares works that present her own body as a site of pleasure and conflict. The exhibition presented projects in various media, including 16mm films, audio installations, photography, and painting that presents parallels between the various interior settings in which her work was created, and the artist-run gallery in which it was exhibited.

Are you There? Yes. Are you there? Yes. a photograph essay exhibited in Banff, Canada and at PARMER gallery in Bedstuy, Brooklyn. It is an installation of still images. On 16mm moving image film, Benedict documented two people performing a repetitive action of checking to see if the other is there. One reaching for the other, over and over again. The film was transferred into digital video then specific digital stills were chosen and arranged into vertical diptychs.

VECCHIO MERDA DANZBAND is a collective that formed in Turin when the four core members Lindsay Benedict (US), Lia Cecchin (IT), Daniella Isamit Morales (VN) and Lisa Perrucci (IT) all met regularly and speaking in three different languages –Italian, Spanish and English. They performed SUPERLIKERS at Centrale Fies an hour-long performance of melancholic songs, instructional dance steps and purposeless karaoke.

Baby, I just want to dance Twelve unknown dances performed in the parking lot of Le Confort Moderne in Poitiers, France. Lindsay Benedict held an open-call to the local public and used a battery powered boom-box for music. Anyone was invited to perform, auditions were never held, and the dancers brought their own music on the evening of the event.

== Collections ==
- Artist book, I Called to You Your Name by Lindsay Benedict in the University of California, Berkeley Art History and Classics library
- DVD, What's love got to do with it? in the University of California, Berkeley Library, Media Resources Center
- DVD, Real live people in the University of California, Berkeley Library, Media Resources Center
- Monographie, I Called to You Your Name by Lindsay Benedict in the Bibliothèque Angoulême, École européenne supérieure de l’image
- Film, You Coated Me with a Layer of Fat Sélection Oodaaq 2012, edition.
