= Suwon Lee =

Korean-Venezuelan artist (born 1977)

- Born: 1977 (age 48–49); Caracas, Venezuela
- Known for: Visual art
- Website: suwonlee.com

Suwon Lee (born 1977) is a Korean-Venezuelan artist based in Madrid, Spain.

== Biography ==
Suwon Lee was born in 1977 to Korean parents in Caracas, Venezuela. She migrated from Venezuela in 2016 and often uses space and belonging as a theme in her photographs. In 2008, she won a grant awarded by Cisneros Fontanals Art Foundation (CIFOs) in Miami, and later that year, she . In this same year, she was included in her first solo show at Periférico Caracas. In the Younger than Jesus Artist Directory (2009), a directory of emerging artists throughout the world, Suwon Lee was the only Venezuelan selected by an international jury to be in the book. In 2005, Suwon Lee and artist Luis Romero co-founded the alternative contemporary art space Oficina#1, located in Caracas. For her work with Oficnia#1, she was nominated and won the International Young Visual Arts Entrepreneur award from the British Council of Venezuela in 2008. Oficina#1 closed in 2016.

== Education ==
Suwon Lee earned her BA in French studies at the American University of Paris in 2001. From 2001 to 2002, she studied photography at Speos Paris Photographic Institute. In 2006, she took the PHotoESPAÑA Masterclass with German photographer Axel Hütte. Alongside her Bachelor's Degree and Masterclass, she worked with Nelson Garrido in his photography workshop in Caracas, Venezuela.

== Artworks ==
Suwon Lee primarily works in photography focusing on landscapes and cityscapes. Her images attempt to show a relationship between physical body and the natural world by emphasizing space, time, and light. More recently, she has worked in nude self-portraits are to show herself as the foreigner and the multicultural identity that she has lived with, being born in Venezuela and coming from Korean parents.

== Exhibitions ==
Selected Solo Shows
Title	Organization	Location	Date
Landscapes & Self-Portraits. Female Voices of Latin America.	Vortic.art	Online Platform	April 4 - May 1, 2021
Mukthi Room” Solo Projects curated by Jesús Fuenmayor.	Pinta Miami	Miami, US	2015
Heima	Espacio Al Borde	Maracaibo, Venezuela	2013
The benign indifference	Galería Fernando Pradilla	Madrid, Spain	2012
Bling! Bling!	Galpón 1	Caracas, Venezuela	2008

Selected Group shows
Title	Organization	Location	Date
Futures Photography 2021	PHotoESPAÑA Circulo de Bellas Artes	Madrid, Spain	2021
Guangzhou Image Triennial 2021: Intermingling Flux. Curated by Gerardo Mosquera	Guangdong Museum of Art	Guangzhou, China	2021
Encuentros en tiempo presente	Centro de Arte Alcobendas	Madrid, Spain	2020
Portadores de sentido. Arte contemporáneo de la Colección Patricia Phelps de Cisneros	Museo Amparo	Puebla, Mexico	2019
Under Construction: Latin America Narratives in the CIFO Collection	Casa Fugaz	Callao, Peru	2019
Soul Mining: The influence of Asian culture and labor in Latin America	Vincent Price Art Museum	Los Angeles, California, US	2018
Soul Mining: The influence of Asian culture and labor in Latin America	Arizona State University Art Museum	Tempe, Arizona, US	2017
América Latina 1963-2013	Fondation Cartier pour l’Art Contemporain	Paris, France	2013
9ª Bienal do Mercosul: Weather Permitting. Curated by Sofía Hernández Chong Cuy	Fundação Bienal de Artes Visuais do Mercosul	Porto Alegre, Brazil	2013
Voyage Voyage	Maison de l’Amérique Latine	Paris, France	2012
Once Tipos	Sala Mendoza	Caracas, Venezuela	2011
I Bienal Internacional de Arte Contemporáneo ULA 2010	Universidad de Los Andes	Mérida, Venezuela	2010
Shifting Constructs. CIFO Grants & Commissions Program	Cisneros Fontanals Art Foundation	Miami, US	2009
XII Salón Jóvenes con FIA	Corp Banca	Caracas, Venezuela	2009
Belong Here	Centro Cultural de España	Santiago, Chile	2008
Reflect/Refract	Rich Gallery	London, United Kingdom	2008
El Futuro es ahora	Fototeca de Veracruz y CASA-Oaxaca	Veracruz, Mexico	2007
Café con Leche: Cultura, Migración, Identidad	Museo de Bellas Artes de Caracas	Caracas, Venezuela	2006
VII Salón CANTV Jóvenes con FIA	Ateneo de Caracas	Caracas, Venezuela	2004
VI Salón Pirelli de Jóvenes Artistas	Museo de Arte Contemporáneo de Caracas	Caracas, Venezuela	2003
Contra>Sentido: Nueva Fotografía Venezolana	Sala Mendoza	Caracas, Venezuela	2003

== Collections ==
Her artwork is held in major metropolitan museums including MoMA New York, Colección Patricia Phelps de Cisneros, CIFO Miami, and Museu de Arte Brasileira da Fundação Armando Alvares Penteado.

== Honors and awards ==
- 2008 - Recipient of the International Young Visual Arts Entrepreneur Award by the British Council.
- 2008 - Recipient of the Grants and Commissions Program awarded by Cisneros Fontanals Art Foundation (CIFO) in Miami.
- 2010 – Emerging Artist Award 2009 from the International Association of Art Critics, Venezuelan Chapter.
- 2011 – Young Artist Prize from the Venezuela Association of Fine Artists
