= Maria Luisa Zuloaga de Tovar =

Venezuelan artist (1902–1992)

Maria Luisa Zuloaga de Tovar (1902–1992) was a Venezuelan ceramicist.

== Education ==
Tovar studied painting with the Catalan artist (then based in Caracas) Ángel Cabré y Magriñá alongside her sister, the painter Elisa Elvira Zuloaga, through private classes arranged by their father in 1916. Finding that she preferred sculpture to painting, she began studies in 1936 at the newly reopened and updated Escuela de Artes Plásticas y Applicadas (School of Fine and Applied Arts) in Caracas. There she studied in the nascent ceramics program directed by João Gonçalves, as well as sculpture under Ernesto Maragall. Tovar traveled to New York in 1939 to study in a workshop established by sculptor Alexander Archipenko, where she continued her studies in ceramics.

== Artwork ==
Returning to Caracas in 1941, she constructed a workshop that housed a brick kiln, only the second in the country. In 1946, she earned the National Prize for Applied Arts at the VII Salón Oficial Annual de Arte Venezolano (Official Annual Venezuelan Art Salon) as well subsequent awards in 1960 and 1961. Throughout her career, Tovar had an interest in Venezuelan vernacular traditions, which manifested itself in the form of abstract patterns recalling pre-Columbian motifs or religious imagery, such as angels or the Virgin and Child. For example, from 1949 until her death, Tovar displayed a glazed ceramic crèche in her home on which she added new figures every year. Aside from explorations with folk imagery, Tovar experimented with materials and familiarized herself with iridescent glazes that gave a metallic appearance to her ceramics. She also used her kiln to form glass plates, which she decorated with the imprint of leaves and plants. In 1962, she earned the gold medal at the International Exhibition of Contemporary Ceramics in Prague and in 1965 the silver medal at the Exposition Internationale, les émaux dans la céramique actuelle at the Musée Ariana (Musée suisse de la céramique et du verre) in Geneva.

== Exhibitions ==
- Sala Mendoza (Caracas), 1968 and 1979. Solo exhibitions.
- Museo de Arte Contemporáneo de Caracas, 1986. Solo exhibition.
- Moderno: Design for Living in Brazil, Mexico, and Venezuela, Americas Society (New York), 2015.
