= Braulio Salazar =

Venezuelan painter (1917–2008)

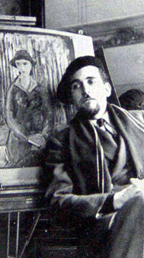
- Salazar in 1949
- Born: December 23, 1917; Valencia, Venezuela
- Died: January 1, 2008 (aged 90); Valencia, Venezuela
- Education: Self-taught
- Known for: Painting, natural pigments
- Notable work: Paintings using natural pigments
- Style: Modernism, naturalist abstraction
- Movement: Venezuelan modern art
- Awards: National Prize of Plastic Arts of Venezuela (1976), Arturo Michelena Prize (1948), Arturo Michelena Prize (1963)

Braulio Salazar (1917–2008) was a Venezuelan painter.

== Biography ==
Salazar was born on 23 December 1917 in Valencia. His first exhibition took place in 1935. As he suffered from hemotitis, doctors banned him from using chemical products. This lead him to make up his own colours with earth, vegetables and other natural substances as his other compatriot, Armando Reverón, used to do.

Salazar was arts teacher at the Pedro Gual high school, at the Simón Rodríguez schoon and at the School of Plastic Arts Arturo Michelena. He also was the head of the Art Workshop at the Department of Humanities in the Faculty of Engineering of the University of Carabobo.

He obtained the National Prize of Plastic Arts of Venezuela in 1976. He won the Arturo Michelena Prize, the most prestigious arts prize in Venezuela, in 1948 and 1963.

The Museum of Modern Arts of Valencia is named after him.
