= Bárbaro Rivas =

Venezuelan painter (1893–1967)

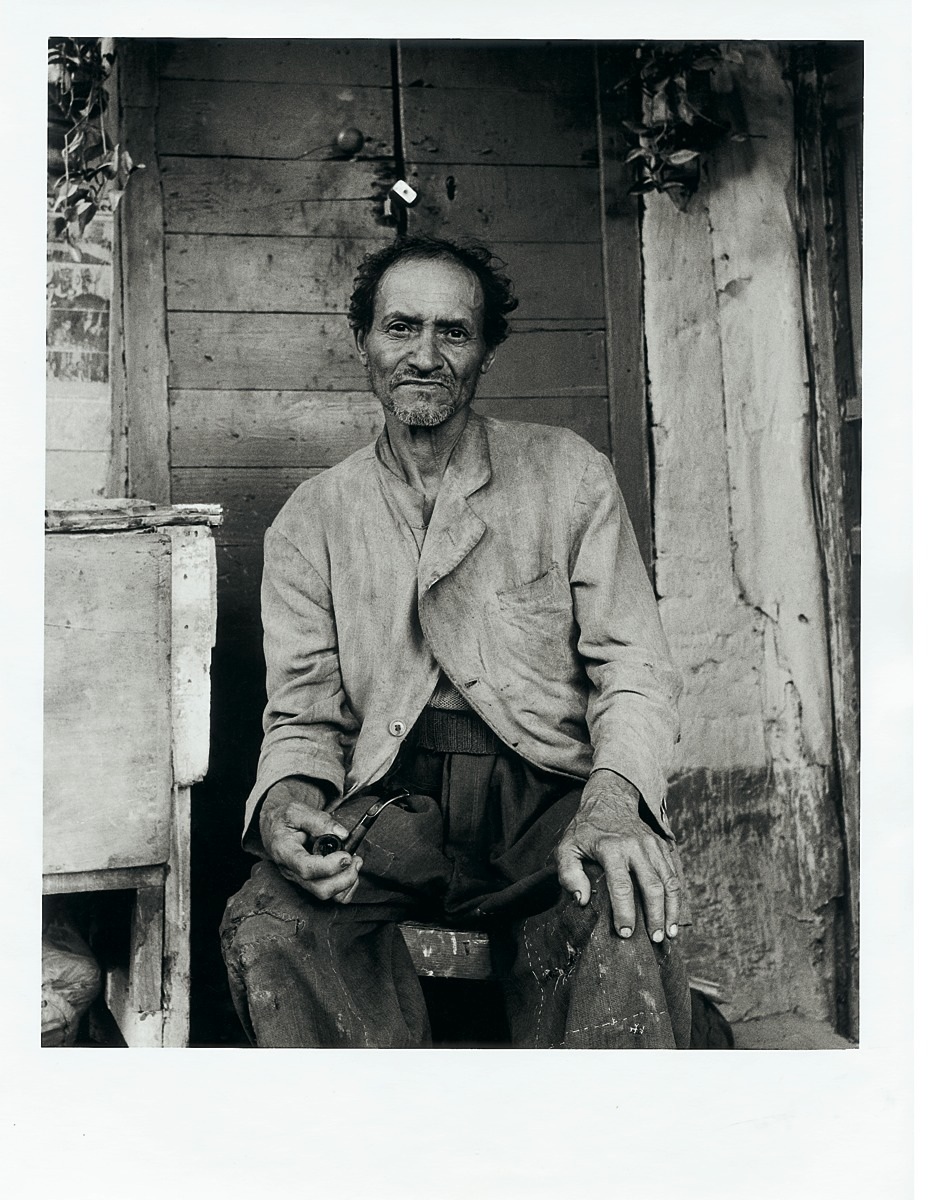
Bárbaro Rivas

Bárbaro Rivas (4 December 1893 – 12 March 1967), was a Venezuelan naive painter born in Petare. His works became known in the early 1950s after his discovery by art critic Francisco Da Antonio in 1949.
