= Cristina Merchán =

Venezuelan artist (1927–1987)

Cristina Merchán (1927 in Venezuela – 1987 in France) was a Venezuelan artist initially trained as a painter, and later became known for her ceramics.

== Education ==
In 1951, she earned a degree from the Universidad de Guadalajara (Mexico), where she had accompanied her spouse, painter, and cartoonist Manuel Antonio Salvatierra. Afterward, she studied low-fire pottery at the Escuela de Artes Plásticas y Aplicadas (School of Fine and Applied Arts) in Caracas (1954–57) with Miguel Arroyo, alongside the potters Tecla Tofano and Reyna Herrera. During these years, she participated in the cooperative Forma Veinte (Form Twenty), and her work was included in the Salón Oficial Anual de Arte Venezolano (Official Annual Venezuelan Art Salon); in 1957, she earned the Premio Nacional de Artes Aplicadas(National Award for Applied Arts). Merchán received grants from the Fundación Eugenio Mendoza that enabled her to travel to Barcelona to study high-fire stoneware with Francesc Albors and José Llorens Artigas at the Conservatorio Municipal de Artes Suntuarias “Massana” (Municipal School of Luxury Arts) from 1958 to 1961.

== Career ==
In 1958, she began dividing her time between Barcelona, Paris, and Caracas and continued to show in group exhibitions at the Sala Mendoza (a Kunsthalle run by the Fundación Mendoza in Caracas) in 1959 and 1960. Her first one-person exhibition of her high-fire pottery was held at the Museo de Bellas Artes (Caracas) in 1963, followed by a solo exhibition at the Sala Mendoza in 1964, where she presented works from her Los Bichos (Bugs) series of fantastical animals. This exhibition marked a pivotal moment, as Merchán transitioned from the tradition of utilitarian ceramics, and became more interested in the medium as sculpture. Her work was shown internationally throughout her lifetime, including solo exhibitions at the Museo de Bellas Artes (1969), Henriette Gomès gallery in Paris (1973, 1976, and 1977), and at the Museu de Cerámica in Barcelona (1980). Her later works consisted mainly of ovoid vases, glazed and fired at high temperatures. Merchán is distinguished by her glazes of subtle tonal variations that are laid over surfaces alternately smooth, textured, or incised with simplistic geometric patterns. Her personal collection of works is now housed at the Musée des Arts Décoratifs, the Louvre, Paris.

== Exhibitions ==
- 1955, 1956, 1957, 1958, 1962, 1967, 1977 : Caracas.
- 1957 : Salón Oficial Anual de Arte Venezolano (Official Annual Venezuelan Art Salon).
- 1960 : École Massana, Barcelona.
- 1963 : Venezuelan Pottery, Museum of Contemporary Crafts, New York.
- 1963, 1965, 1969, 1977 : Caracas. Solo exhibitions.
- 1965, 1980 : Musée Cantini, Marseille.
- 1967 : Ateneo, Madrid.
- 1968, 1970, 1972, 1974 : Biennales internationales de Céramique d'Art, Vallauris.
- 1969 : Museo de Bellas Artes, Caracas. Solo exhibition.
- 1969 : Internationales Kunsthandwerk, Stuttgart.
- 1973, 1976, 1979 : Henriette Gomès, Paris. Solo exhibitions.
- 1980 : Museu de Cerámica, Barcelona.
- 2015 : Moderno: Design for Living in Brazil, Mexico, and Venezuela, 1940–1978 , Americas Society, New York.
