= Luis Caballero (painter) =

Luis Caballero Holguin
- Born: 27 August 1943; Bogotá, Colombia
- Died: 19 June 1995 (aged 51); Bogotá, Colombia
- Education: Académie de la Grande Chaumière
- Known for: Painting

Luis Caballero Holguín (27 August 1943 – 19 June 1995) was a Colombian painter, watercolourist, pastellist and lithographer. Caballero is known for depicting masculine figures, which often include both erotic and violent imagery. He is viewed as one of the most important figures in Colombian art.

== Biography ==
Caballero was born in Bogotá and raised in a conservative Catholic household. He studied at the University of Los Andes (Colombia) in 1961–62, where he met and was influenced by etcher artist Juan Antonio Roda and art critic Marta Traba. He continued his academic studies in Paris at the Académie de la Grande Chaumière, graduating in 1964. It is during this time that he discovered Willem de Kooning, and Francis Bacon. Back in Colombia, in 1968, he won First Prize at the First Ibero-American Biennal of Medellín.

Caballero returned to Paris where he found more freedom in 1969 and lived there until 1995, when he returned to Bogota for a special exhibition of his work at the Luis Ángel Arango Library.

He died in June of the same year at the age of fifty-one.

His figurative works are usually large scale mixed media oil, ink, watercolor washes on either canvas or paper, sometimes incorporating fabrics or rope in a limited range of muted sepia colors, often representing male nude figures, in a contemporary style marked by classic training.

The Tate Museum in London acquired a work by the artist in 2023.

In 2024, the first UK exhibition by the artist opened at Cecilia Brunson Projects curated by Daniel Malarkey.

== Publications and bibliography ==
- Luis Caballero by Luis Caballero
- Luis Caballero : the male nude : May 3-May 29, 1994 by Luis Caballero
- Luis Caballero : paintings & drawings by Luis Caballero
- L. Caballero, Me tocó ser así
- Barnitz, Jacqueline. Twentieth-Century Art of Latin America. Austin: University of Texas Press, 2001. ISBN 9780292708587
- Rodríguez, Marta. Luis Caballero. Arte Nexus: Arte en Colombia 27 (January–March 1998): 121–23.
- Sokolowski, Thomas. Luis Caballero: Large Scale Drawings. New York: Nohra Haime Gallery, 1991. Catalogue of Exhibition, Grey Art Gallery, New New York University's fine art museum, June 4-July 12, 1991.
