= Lía Bermúdez =

Venezuelan sculptor (1930–2021)

- Lía Bermúdez
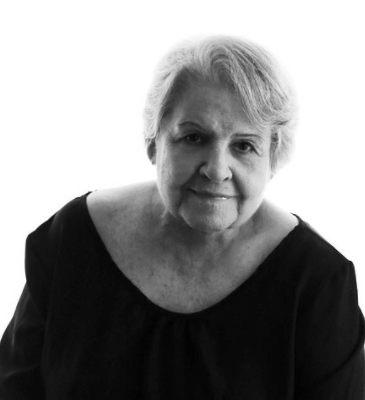
- Born: Lía Bermúdez; August 4, 1930; Caracas, Venezuela
- Died: October 22, 2021 (aged 91); Caracas, Venezuela
- Education: Escuela de Artes Aplicadas, Caracas; Escuela de Bellas Artes, Maracaibo
- Known for: Sculpture
- Style: Abstract, monumental sculpture
- Movement: Modernism
- Awards: National Prize of Plastic Arts of Venezuela,2006, Order of the Liberator (Venezuela), Order of Francisco de Miranda, Order of Maracaibo City, First Class, Zulia Governor's Award, Ana Maria Campos Decoration, University of Carabobo Award

Lía Bermúdez (4 August 1930 – 22 October 2021) was a Venezuelan sculptor.

Bermúdez was born in Caracas. She began her studies at the School of Applied Arts in Caracas (1944–1946) and moved to Maracaibo. There in 1947, she continued her studies at the Escuela de Bellas Artes. She was a student of the masters Francisco Narváez and Julio Maragall.

Major exhibitions: Centro de Bellas Artes, Maracaibo, Zulia State, 1957, Ateneo de Valencia, Carabobo State, 1966, Gallery of Visual Arts, University of Zulia, Maracaibo, Museum of Modern Art of Latin America, Washington, DC, 1979, Museo de Arte Contemporáneo de Caracas, 1989. In 1992, this museum presented a retrospective of her work.

She was awarded the Order of the Liberator Knighthood, an award from the university of Carabobo, Zulia Governor's Award, Order of Maracaibo City in the first class, Order of Francisco de Miranda, Ana Maria Campos decoration and the National Prize of Plastic Arts of Venezuela 2006 amongst others.

She died at her home in Caracas on 22 October 2021, aged 91.
