= Fernando Asián =

Venezuelan artist

Fernando Asián (born 1951) is a Spanish-Venezuelan artist.

== Early life ==
He was a story writer for Chiqui de la Fuente's comics. From this first collaboration grew many others, including the "Genicabra" and "Gag" series for the Barcelona Junior Gazette. He was the founder of Madrid's Diario Pueblo's El Cuco Sunday supplement, introducing series such as "El Soñador" and "XB1". He wrote the first anti-war comic under Franco's Spain. When he denied to commit to drafting, he moved to England, publishing his works on BBC and IPC magazines. Through SI Artists and Temple Art in London, he collaborates internationally, such as with "Zodiac" and "Johannes" published in Tarot magazine.

== Awards ==
- Emilio Boggio Award
- Caracas Metro Award
