= Enrique Enn =

Venezuelan street artist

- Born: Alexis Novoa; December 13, 1995 (age 30); San Cristóbal, Venezuela
- Known for: Street art, painting
- Notable work: Vision, Richie Rich, Supreme x Lamborghini Skateboard Deck
- Style: Graffiti, pop art, neon palette
- Movement: Street art
- Website: enriqueenn.com

Alexis Novoa (Born December 13, 1995, San Cristóbal, Venezuela), known as Enrique Enn, is a Venezuelan street artist and painter, currently resides in Miami, Florida.

His style is characterized by making tags of graffiti on canvas, also for the use of techniques such as screen printing, stencil, spray paint, acrylic paint, and oil paint. He has done artistic works for soccer players, singers.

== Biography ==
Originally from the city of San Cristóbal, Enrique was introduced to art from a very young age, started doing graffiti in his hometown at the age of 14.

In 2014, Enrique at the age of 18 decided to move to the United States to the city of Miami with his sister due to the economic and social problems of Venezuela. In this new stage, he resumed his artistic work, thus obtaining different collaborations with various personalities from the artistic milieu, likewise, participation in various art exhibitions in the United States and France.

In 2021, the Venezuelan artist was placed in the top 10 of the most important street artists by Google, under the term "Street Art". In that same year, he launched his work entitled "Vision", depicting characteristic characters from his childhood and with messages for his followers.

== Style ==
Enrique Enn shows different techniques in his works. Usually, his style is distinguished by the combination of acrylic paint with spray paint, working in a neon color palette.

== Notable works ==
- 2015: alternative graphic arts for "Gatilleros (Remix)".
- 2016: graphic arts for "Pa ti" by Bad Bunny and Bryant Myers.
- 2019: alternative graphic arts for the album Oasis by J Balvin and Bad Bunny.
- 2020: "Supreme x Lamborghini Skateboard deck" by Enrique Enn.
- 2020: "Richie Rich" (portraits of actor Macaulay Culkin).
- 2021: "Pizarro" (work inspired by the soccer player Rodolfo Pizarro).
- 2021: "Visión" (NFT)
- 2022: Supreme x Tupac Hologram Skateboard deck by Enrique Enn
