= Elisa Elvira Zuloaga =

Venezuelan artist (1900–1980)

- 1953
- Born: Elisa Elvira Zuloaga Ramírez; 25 November 1900; Caracas, Venezuela
- Died: 14 April 1980 (aged 79); Caracas, Venezuela
- Occupation: artist
- Years active: 1933–1975
- Known for: color engravings and landscapes

Elisa Elvira Zuloaga (25 November 1900 – 14 April 1980) was a noted Venezuelan painter and engraver. Winning numerous prizes for her works, she has four landscapes in the permanent collections of the National Art Gallery in Caracas and is remembered as an important South American graphic artist.

== Early life ==
Elisa Elvira Zuloaga Ramírez was born on 25 November 1900 in Caracas, Venezuela to Elisa Ramírez and Nicomedes Zuloaga. She studied at the Academy of Fine Arts, with her sister Maria Luisa Zuloaga de Tovar, under the tutelage of the Catalan artist, Ángel Cabré y Magriñá. The school broke apart in 1918 and she traveled to Paris to study at the Académie de la Grande Chaumière.

Zuloaga went on to further her studies with André Lhote in 1935 and exhibited in at the Parisian gallery Salón de los Independientes in 1937 and 1939. At the beginning of World War II, she studied at the Ozenfant School of Fine Arts in New York City with Amédée Ozenfant.

== Career ==
Returning to Caracas, in 1941, Zuloaga became a founding member and co-director of Caracas' Venezuelan-American Center. She established her own workshop in 1942 in the gardens of the Hacienda Valle Abajo, where the Graphic Arts Workshop (Spanish: Taller de Artes Gráficas (TAGA)) now holds classes. In 1946, she became one of the first women to hold a post in the Venezuelan government, when she was appointed as the Director of Culture in the Ministry of National Education. In 1950, Zuloaga returned to New York City to study engraving, taking courses with both Johnny Friedlaender and Stanley William Hayter. She was particularly influenced by Hayter's method of color printing often utilizing numerous layers of pigment and burnishing techniques to achieve her desired result.

In the early part of her career, Zuloaga was primarily known for her landscapes. Later, after her studies with Lhote, she moved away from pictorial works. Beginning in the 1950s, she produced high-quality color engravings and in the 1960s, Zuloaga's work took on the qualities of abstraction. Zuloaga saw painting and engraving as independent disciplines, requiring separate skills to achieve the desired result. She was one of the first artists in Venezuela to pursue engraving as an art form and her 1963 exhibit at the Museo de Bellas Artes and the Venezuelan School of Architecture introduced her etching techniques to the public. She returned to landscape painting in the 1970s using a more poetic or imagined vision, which focused on the remembered reality of observation, rather than strict adherence to copying exactly what was seen. Pilar Muñoz López, a professor and art critic at the Autonomous University of Madrid, has named Zuloaga as "one of the most important graphic artists in South America".

== Death and legacy ==
Zuloaga died in Caracas on 14 April 1980. Four of her landscape works are in the collections of the National Art Gallery of Caracas. She was featured on a commemorative stamp bearing her likeness, issued by the government of Venezuela in 1991.

== Awards and recognition ==
- 1946 Arístides Rojas Prize, 7th Official Salon of Caracas
- 1953 Painting Award, 13th Official Salon of Caracas
- 1954 Antonio Edmundo Monsanto Prize, 12th Arturo Michelena Art Biennial, in Carabobo, Venezuela
- 1956 Antonio Herrera Toro Prize, 17th Official Salon of Caracas
- 1959 First Prize, 1st National Exhibition of Drawing and Engraving of the Central University of Venezuela
- 1962 Armando Reverón Prize, 23rd Official Salon of Caracas
- 1968 National Prize of Engraving, 29th Official Salon of Caracas
