= Pancho Quilici =

Venezuelan visual artist

- Born: April 16, 1954 (age 72); Caracas, Venezuela
- Education: Instituto de Diseño Neumann, Centro de Enseñanza Gráfica (CEGRA)
- Known for: Visual arts, drawing, painting, installation
- Notable work: The planet looks at itself, The large glass, The great register
- Style: Symbolism, fantastical art, geometric and imaginary landscapes
- Movement: Postmodern, surrealism
- Awards: Awards at International Exposition of Contemporary & Modern Art (Chicago), International Fair of Contemporary Art (Paris)

Pancho Quilici (born in Caracas, April 16, 1954) is a Venezuelan visual artist, known for his work with geometric and abandoned landscapes as its recurring subjects which frequently feature impossible architecture, with symbolic and fantastical influences. His work has been described as being influenced by Giambattista Piranesi.

== Early life ==
Pancho Quilici is the son of architect Antonio Quilici and his wife, Elena de Quilici. In 1978 he graduates from the Neumann Institute of Design, and promptly begins studies at the Center for Graphic Learning (CEGRA), where he took lessons from Alirio Palacios, Luisa Palacios, Luisa Richter, and Édgar Sánchez.

He taught expression techniques at the Antonio José de Sucre Institute of Technology in Caracas.

Since 1977, he has participated in group exhibitions and salons, in which he has received awards as early as 1978, including at the International Exposition of Contemporary & Modern Art in Chicago as well as the International Fair of Contemporary Art in Paris.

== Career ==
In 1990, the French Government commissions a mural for the Arcueil village. He then exhibits "A journey to the source" at the Museo de Bellas Artes de Caracas with works dating between 1989 and 1991, featuring rhythmic journeys, multiplied numbers in landscapes, and installations. The year after, he becomes stage designer for Idoménée at the Opera Bastille in Paris.

At the "Venezuela. New cartographies and cosmogonies" group show (Galería de Arte Nacional, 1991), he exhibited "The planet looks at itself" (1991, GAN collection), an installation which depicted an imaginary temple in which the four elements gather symbolically, thus displaying nature. The piece was composed by a large mixed media mosaic made up of acrylic, oil, watercolor, and graphite on canvas, framed by a paper peristyle.

In 1998 he arranges an exhibit titled "Wanderings" (RG Room), based upon symbols and archetypes, where he exhibited large scale pieces such as The large glass (a homage to Marcel Duchamp's piece which is often referred to by the same name) using aluminum, wood, cable, and crystal, as materials, as well as The great register, a cloth seven meters long.

Quilici has done illustration work for magazines such as Falso Cuaderno and La Gaceta Ilustrada.

== Style ==
According to Juan Calzadilla, Venezuelan poet, painter, and art critic, Pancho Quilici displayed notable virtuosity as a draftsman from the early stages of his career: "his composition shoots out into open spaces like the temptation of the infinite man for reaching towards cosmic knowledge. Quilici recomposes the rules of the golden age of the Renaissance, and adjusts them to a surrealist vision that, in their focal amplitude, graze science fiction and alchemy".

== Collections ==
Quilici's work is represented in the Museo de Arte de Ponce.
