= José Gamarra =

José Gamarra (born 1934 in Tecuarembó, Uruguay) is a Uruguayan painter who has lived in Paris, France, since 1963.

== Artwork ==
His paintings are usually landscapes, with a dreamlike tropical universe. Grand forests, lianas, troubled waters, and living anacondas and caimans are often placed in historical or incongruous scenes.

His favourite theme is the denunciation of colonialism, with caravelles and helicopters present in an otherwise harmonious scene emphasising their indesirable presence.

His art is displayed at the Metropolitan Museum of Art, New York and the Museum of Modern Art.

== Notes ==
- Dictionnaire Culturel d'Amérique Latine. Jean-Paul DUVIOLS. Ellipses
