= Azalea Quiñones =

Venezuelan painter and poet (born 1951)

Azalea Celenia Quiñones
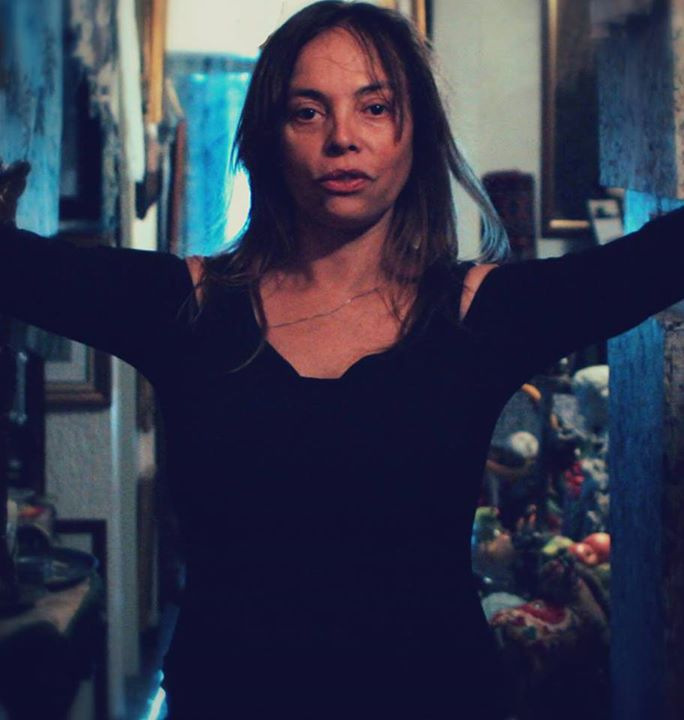
- Premio Nacional de Artes Plásticas, 2013
- Born: May 27, 1951
- Awards: National Prize of Plastic Arts of Venezuela

External videos
- “Notables: Azalea Quiñones”, Colombeia TV Juvenil, Nov 5, 2012

Azalea Quiñones (27 May 1951 El Tigre) is a Venezuelan painter and poet. In her plastic arts work, she combines techniques of drawing, painting and collage, using materials such as charcoal, crayon, jute, oil, pastels, paint and silk. Her book Purisima includes both prose and poetry.

Quiñones received a 2010 National Prize of Plastic Arts of Venezuela. Her works have been exhibited in major galleries and exhibitions including the Salón Nacional de Jóvenes Artistas (National Salon of Young Artists), the Galería Tiempo Argentino, the first Havana Biennial and the Galería de Arte Nacional (GAN), and have been shown in Buenos Aires, Colombia, Cuba, Mexico, Spain, Switzerland, Germany, and the United States as well as Venezuela.

== Early life and education ==
In 1956, the Quiñones-Hernández family moved to Caracas. In 1972, she entered the Escuela de Artes Plásticas Cristóbal Rojas de Caracas (School of Plastic Arts Cristobal Rojas), where she studied with artists including Luis Guevara Moreno, Alirio Rodríguez, Edgar Sánchez and Pedro León Zapata.

In 1975, she graduated from the School of Plastic Arts Cristóbal Rojas. She traveled to Bogotá and Medellín between 1976 and 1977, visiting Galleries and Museums. She was inspired by the work of Colombian painter Fernando Botero. She visited New York, Panama and Mexico at the end of 1978.

== Artwork ==
In the 1980s, she lived and traveled through all of Europe, traveling to Germany and Switzerland. While in Madrid, Spain, she connected with Goya’s Black Paintings series and the works of Gaudí in Barcelona. She visited Paris and Rome, meeting the era's leading plastic artists. She attended the Venice Biennale and returned to Spain after exposure to the masters of European art, and a particular study of Picasso’s work.

She returned to Venezuela in 1981, and inspired by the Black Paintings, created a series of large scale portraits and religious self portraits. Here, she introduced the double self portrait that she has developed throughout her career, most evident in her work El Arcángel. Here, she starts to center her work around double identity and experience (desdoblamiento).

Her first nude self portraits were made with a religious theme, incorporating Venezuelan public figures. Crucifixion became the center of her religious work, seen in La Cena where she personifies Jesus and Judas in a double self portrait. Here, she started a brief white phase based on the theme of communion.

In 1982, Quiñones started and finished her Penintencias series, incorporating collage in her self portraits. She started her series La Boda, a collage series, and ended her white phase, which developed with a religious mysticism (misticismo) best exemplified by her piece, Los Invitados.

In 1984, she launched her red phase with Las Niñas de Carroll series, an homage to Lewis Carroll. She finished her El Tarot series in sketch and oil paint.

In 1987 she posed for a nude painting for the photography exhibition Los Revulsivos by Luigi Scotto. This exhibition was displayed in a gallery called Los Espacios Cálidos in the Caracas Athenaeum, which is a cultural institution. One year later, the exhibition was displayed in the south of Brazil.

At the beginning of the 90s, Quiñones started the series Tiempo de Flores y Otros Deleites, which featured works painted with her fingers. Later she traveled to the Venezuelan Andes mountains and stayed in Rubio, a town in the state of Táchira for one year. Here she started and finished the series Los Infantes, which she said was inspired by her dreams of games, dolls and objects from her infancy dressed in illusion and fantasy. The series used mixed media including oil paints on paper.

Quiñones returned to Caracas in the middle of 1995. In Caracas, she exhibited the Los Infantes series and finished the oil painting series called Viaje al fin de la noche, where she started exploring nude self-portraits again. She profoundly integrated the Catholic religion into her life and work.

At the beginning of 1999 she continued with everyday characters and included portraits of children, Jewish families and Holocaust victims within a series. Textures and rapid brush strokes can be seen in the background of the paintings. She finished and showcased the oil painting series called Por el Mundo.

Azalea Quiñones completed a triptych entitled Paz en la tierra (Peace on Earth) in 2002, followed by the pieces Rojo infinito (Infinite red, 2004) and Del infinito Rojo (2004). She received the Premio Nacional de Cultura Artes Plásticas Venezuela (National Award of Culture of Venezuela for Plastic Arts), 2008–2010.
