= Tecla Tofano =

Venezuelan artist, writer (1927–1995)

Tecla Tofano (1927 in Naples, Italy – 1995 in Caracas, Venezuela) was an Italian-born Venezuelan artist, ceramicist, and writer active from the 1950s until her death in 1995. Tofano studied ceramics and enamel with Miguel Arroyo at the Escuela de Artes Plásticas y Applicadas (School of Fine and Applied Arts, Caracas), alongside fellow students and ceramicists, Cristina Merchán and Reyna Herrera. A member of the cooperative Forma Veinte (Form Twenty), her works garnered wide acclaim, and she became known for her controversial, political, and feminist imagery.

== Artwork ==
Two distinct phases characterize her oeuvre: from 1955 to 1963, Tofano worked in a more traditional vein, creating utilitarian objects with incised and textured surfaces; thereafter, she became unconcerned with her work's usefulness, instead creating uniquely expressive sculptures from clay. Tofano's ceramics were charged with emotion, sexuality, and humor.

== Exhibitions and awards ==
Tofano was awarded the National Prize for Applied Arts in XIX Official Venezuelan Art Salon (1958) and the gold and silver medals at the International Exhibition of Contemporary Ceramics (in Prague in 1961 and Buenos Aires in 1962). She created series of works for display in exhibitions, such as Los accesorios (The Accessories, 1970) – featuring handbags, shoes, and other feminine items – and Lo que comen los que comen (What People Who Eat Eat, 1973), a feast of ceramic food complete with table, chairs, and diners. She was part of the faculty of the school of architecture and urbanism at the Universidad Central de Venezuela (1959–80). From 1977 until 1987, Tofano refrained from exhibiting her work and focused instead on her writing, and feminist activism undertaken through the women's collective, Miércoles. Her work returned to the public realm in 1987 and 1989, when she exhibited her drawings. Her work was featured in the exhibition Moderno: Design for Living in Brazil, Mexico, and Venezuela. Between 1940 and 1978, her work was featured at the Americas Society, New York City (February 11 – May 16, 2015) and in the exhibition, Radical Women: Latin American Art, 1960–1985 in the Brooklyn Museum in 2018.

In 2022, her work was included in the thematic exhibit A Leaf a Gourd a Shell a Net a Bag a Sling a Sack a Bottle a Pot a Box a Container for the 59th Venice Biennale.

== Writing ==
Tofano wrote extensively as a columnist for the El Nacional newspaper in addition to several books, including Quién inventó la silla (Who Invented the Chair, 1968), Yo misma me presento (I Presented Myself, 1973), and Ni con el pétalo de una rosa (Not with Rose Petals, 1975).

== Bibliography ==
- Barbieri, Nelly. El movimiento cerámico en Venezuela. Caracas: CONAC, 1998.
- Diccionario biográfico de las artes visuales en Venezuela. Caracas: Fundación Galería de Arte Nacional, 2005.
- Moderno: Design for Living in Brazil, Mexico, and Venezuela, 1940–1978. New York: Americas Society, 2015.
