= Aimée Battistini =

Venezuelan painter (1916–1989)

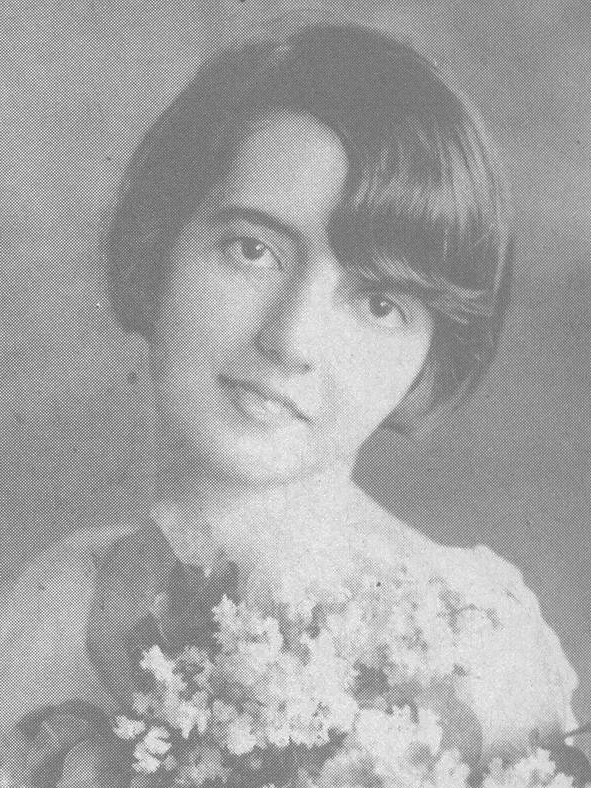
- Born: 1916; El Callao, Bolívar, Venezuela
- Died: 8 July 1989 (aged 72–73); Paris, France

Aimée Battistini (1916 – 8 July 1989) was a Venezuelan painter.

== Biography ==
Battistini was born to a Corsican family, in the state of Bolívar, Venezuela. From a young age she reproduced classics of oil painting.

Upon moving to Paris in 1928 with her family, Battistini began four years of studies at the Académie Julian. She worked in her own studio between 1936 and 1939, a period that was marked by an impressionist trend, although during this time she also dabbled in the Cubist style.

In 1940, Battistini returned to Venezuela and her friendship with the painter and sculptor Alejandro Otero began, whom he would help her upon their arrival in Paris with Jesús Rafael Soto years later. In 1941, she lived in New York City and Mexico City, until 1945 when she returned to France after the end of the Second World War. Her house in Paris was the meeting place for the group called Los disidentes, made up of Venezuelan artists who were supporters of the abstractionist style and were against the plastic canon that was in force in Venezuela, where landscape, anecdotal and indigenous styles predominated. In March 1950, they began to publish a homonymous abstract art magazine. Battistini participated in a group exhibition organized in Paris by the Denise René Gallery in 1953; here, she was together with important artists of the abstract-geometric avant-garde. A year later, she dissolves a group of artists that worked around her workshop and that was called La Sapoara.

From 1954 to 1961, Battistini lived in Buenos Aires, and then she returned to Paris, where she would reside until the day of her death. Three years later, she would definitively retire from painting.
