= Juan Calzadilla =

Venezuelan artist (1930–2025)

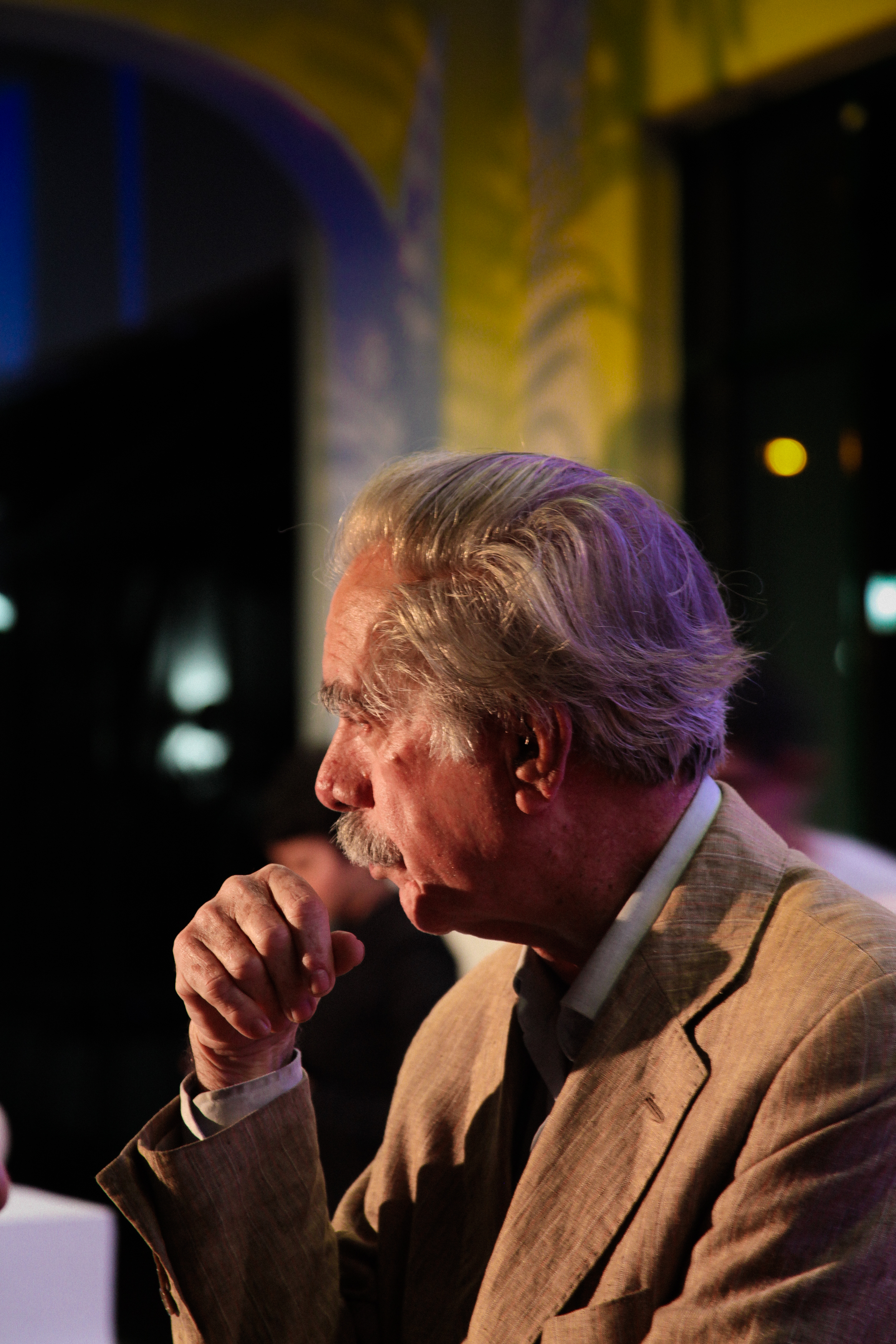
Juan Calzadilla (2012)

Juan Calzadilla (16 May 1930 – 15 June 2025) was a Venezuelan poet, painter and art critic.

== Early life and education ==
Calzadilla was born on 16 May 1930. He studied in the Universidad Central de Venezuela and in the Instituto Pedagógico Nacional.

== Artistic life ==
Calzadilla was co-founder of the group El techo de la ballena (1961), and Imagen magazine (1984). Calzadilla represented Venezuela at the 57th Venice Art Biennale.

== Death ==
Calzadilla died on 15 June 2025, at the age of 95.

== Works ==
- Dictado por la jauría (1962)
- Malos modales (1968)
- Oh smog (1978)
- Antología paralela (1988)
- Minimales (1993)
- Principios de Urbanidad (1997)
- Corpolario (1998)
- Diario sin sujeto (1999)
- Aforemas (2004)
- Vela de armas (2008)
- Noticias del alud (2009)

== Awards ==
- National Prize of Plastic Arts of Venezuela, 1996.
