= Alirio Rodríguez =

Venezuelan painter and visual artist (1934–2018)

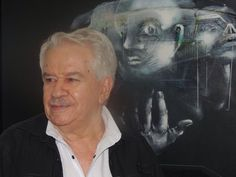
- Alirio Rodríguez
- Born: Alirio Rodríguez; April 4, 1934; El Callao, Bolívar, Venezuela
- Died: May 2, 2018 (aged 84); Caracas, Venezuela
- Occupations: Painter; Visual artist; Teacher
- Years active: 1950s–2018
- Awards: National Painting Prize (Venezuela, 1969)

Alirio Rodríguez (4 April 1934 – 2 May 2018) was a Venezuelan painter and visual artist. Reference works and later press coverage describe him as a precursor of Venezuelan nueva figuración (New Figuration). He received Venezuela’s National Painting Prize in 1969 and was commissioned to create the large stained-glass installation known as the Vitral de la Justicia for Venezuela’s (then) Supreme Court building (today the Supreme Tribunal of Justice) in Caracas.

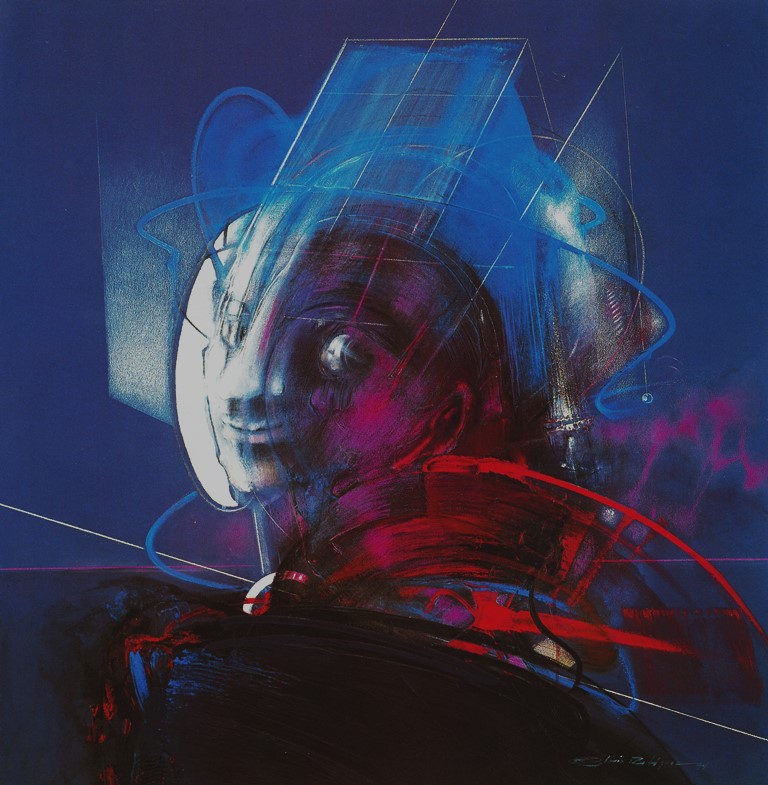
Homage to Columbus, painting by Alirio Rodríguez.

== Early life and education ==
Rodríguez was born in El Callao (Bolívar state) on 4 April 1934, the son of Arturo Rodríguez Lozada and Teodora Borges Santi. He moved to Caracas in 1947 and studied at the Escuela de Artes Plásticas Aplicadas (Caracas) through 1955; he also worked at the Taller Libre de Arte in Caracas (1950–1952).

In 1958 Rodríguez traveled to Italy to continue his studies, including at the Instituto d’Arte di Roma, and later in Ravenna, where he studied mosaic techniques.

== Career ==
Rodríguez held his first solo exhibition in 1957 in Caracas (AVP). He exhibited in Venezuela and abroad throughout the following decades; the GAN dictionary lists solo exhibitions including Washington, D.C. (1969) and New York (1977), among others.

He represented Venezuela at the XXXVII Venice Biennale (1975). The GAN dictionary also notes public commissions and institutional projects, including Tejedores de energía (installed at the UIT headquarters as a donation by the Venezuelan government) and a mural titled Tribunal n.º 1 installed at the Central Bank of Venezuela building.

Rodríguez also worked as an educator. Obituaries and profiles describe him as a drawing-and-painting teacher and as having held teaching leadership roles at the Escuela de Artes Plásticas Cristóbal Rojas in Caracas, and as an associate professor at the Instituto Pedagógico de Caracas (1974–1976).

== Style and themes ==
The GAN dictionary describes Rodríguez’s early work as figurative painting with “free forms” and shifting perspectives, and notes that he later favored acrylic over oil because of drying time. It also summarizes critical commentary that emphasizes gestural line, spiraling or orbital strokes, and recurring themes of vertigo, anguish, and the human figure placed in unstable or ambiguous spaces. A review in Arte al Día likewise discusses his neo-figurative approach and the tension between figuration and abstraction in his compositions.

== Public works ==
=== Vitral de la Justicia ===
According to the GAN dictionary, Rodríguez worked in Paris and Chartres with specialist stained-glass workshops on a stained-glass installation for Venezuela’s Supreme Court building (today the TSJ), inaugurated in 1983. It describes the work as approximately 750 square metres and notes its blue-toned palette, shifting perspective effects across floors, and the use of aluminum supports and grisaille techniques; it also states that the work has been described as the largest stained-glass work in the world. Obituaries commonly highlight the Vitral de la Justicia as one of his best-known public works.

== Awards ==
The following is a partial list of awards and prizes earned by Rodríguez:

- 1957 – Second Prize, Ateneo de Valera y Trujillo (Trujillo state, Venezuela)
- 1961 – Drawing Award, Casa de la Cultura de Aragua (Maracay, Venezuela)
- 1962 – Arturo Michelena Award, XX Salón Arturo Michelena (Venezuela)
- 1963 – Emilio Boggio Award, XXI Salón Arturo Michelena; Drawing Award, Ateneo de Caracas
- 1965 – First Prize for Drawing, “Exposición nacional de dibujo y grabado”, Facultad de Arquitectura (UCV); Award, Venezuelan Association of Architects, XXVI Salón Oficial
- 1966 – Federico Brandt Award and Marcos Castillo Award, XXVII Salón Oficial; Premio OCI
- 1968 – Acquavella Award, XXIX Salón Oficial
- 1969 – National Painting Prize, XXX Salón Oficial (Venezuela)
- 1972 – Honorary Mention (foreign painters), Bienal de Quito (Ecuador)
- 1974 – First Prize, “Salón las artes plásticas en Venezuela”, Museo de Bellas Artes (Caracas)
- 1981 – Renaissance for the Arts Award, Renaissance Circle (Paris, France)
- 1995 – Alejandro Otero Award (Bolívar state); Pedro Ángel González Fine Arts Medal (Caracas)

== Writings ==
Rodríguez also published essays on art and humanism. The ICAA/MFAH Documents Project describes his 1979 text Latinoamérica: Identidad y conciencia de un nuevo arte humanístico (published in El Universal) as arguing for a human-centered artistic language in response to technological discourse, and links it to earlier writings compiled in Carta a nadie (1975). Later obituaries report that he published Alirio Rodríguez: De su pintura y letra in 2016.

== Death ==
Rodríguez died in Caracas on 2 May 2018 at the age of 84. Press reports stated that he had been hospitalized for about a month with pneumonia.
