= Julio Maragall =

Spanish-born Venezuelan sculptor and architect (born 1936)

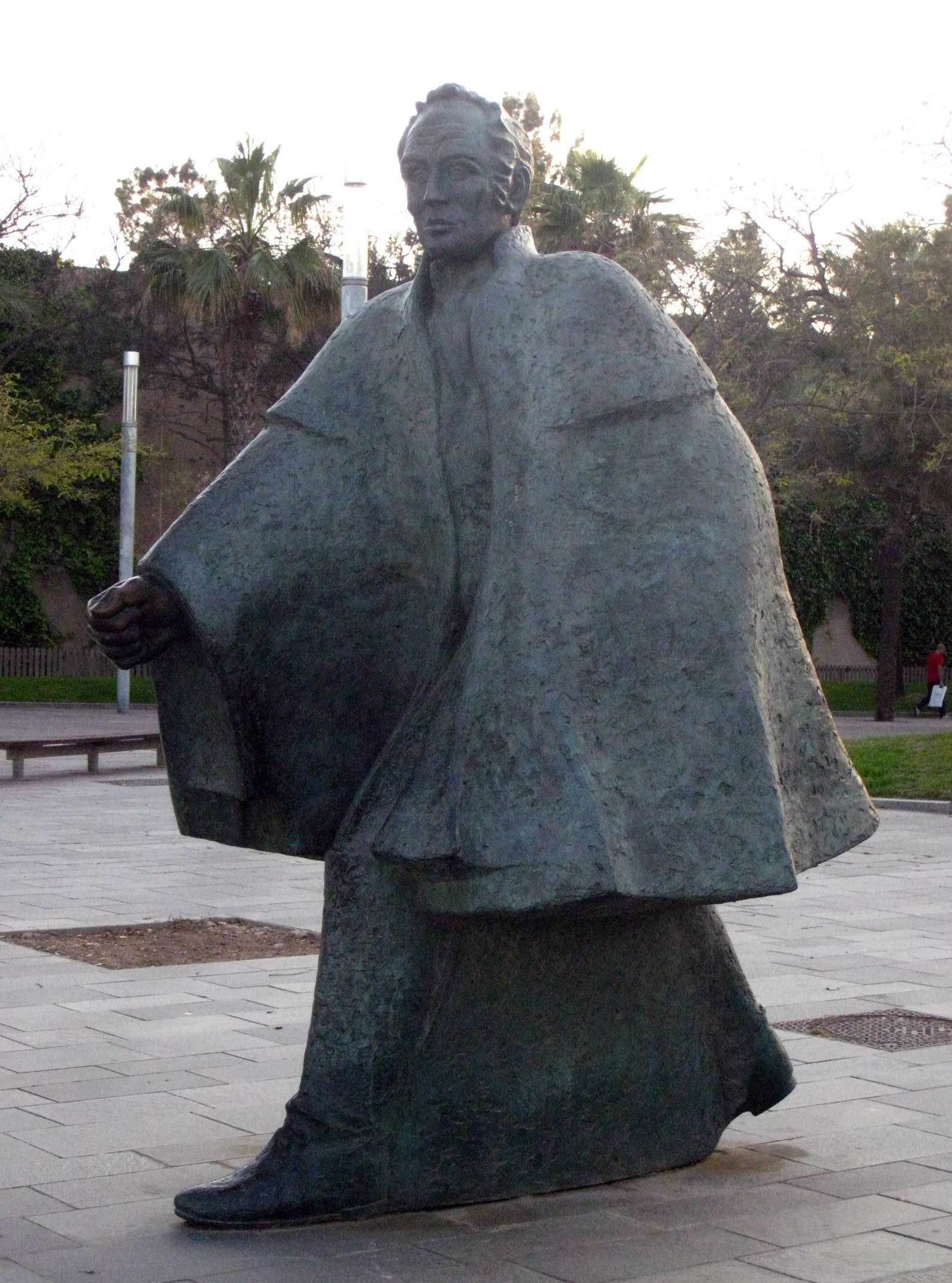

Julio Maragall (born 1936) is a Spanish-born Venezuelan sculptor and architect.
