= Yeni and Nan =

Venezuelan artists

- Born: Jennifer Hacksaw (Yeni) & María Luisa González (Nan); 14 March 1956 & 1948; Coyoacán, Caracas, Venezuela
- Known for: Performance; video; photography; interactive
- Notable work: Birth I and II (1979); Developed Bodily Actions of the Cycle of Life (1983); Presencias (1980); Space Divided Action (1981); Integraciones contemplativas (1982); Integrations and Integrations in water II (1982); Nature in three times (1986)
- Movement: Happenings, Nature, Feminine and Elements
- Website: nangonzalezvideo.blogspot.com

Yeni and Nan are a team of Venezuelan artists. They were featured in exhibitions across the United States and Latin America. Yeni-Jennifer Hacksaw (born 1948), developed a creative partnership with Nan González (María Luisa González, born 1956), under the name Yeni and Nan, carried out artistic performances and multimedia installations, which identified with 1980s conceptual art.

Initially they based their propositions on three primary themes: the problem of personal identity, the limits of the individual, and share space in the tu-yo dialectic and that of the natural elements. The body and the approach to nature were central themes of their research and reflections in the search for vital keys of creation and life. They framed the self-designed and interiorist affiliation with the ecological calls of the 20th century avant-garde and with primitive symbolism of the natural world, producing moving conceptual and aesthetic proposals of both humanity and nature, "the body of one as the body of the world" (good/bad of the planet as good/bad of the being). The Venezuelan collectives of performance art were active between 1977-1986.

Reflection on the female body and nature, video and photography, Land Art and performance are some of the concepts and materials that come together in their work. Their performances handled concepts such as freedom, nature and the female body, with the aim of "showing another look on the woman's body, of a poetic, philosophical and symbolic form, but also political".

== Education ==
Yeni-Jennifer Hacksaw studied at the Cristobal Rojas School (1975-1977), the Central School of Art and the Chelsea School of Art in London (1977-1978), the School of Image in Cannes, France (1978-1980) and the Workshop of Experimental Cinema with the filmmaker Alfredo Anzola (Caracas, 1980) from 1979-1986.

María Luisa "Nan" González, studied at the Cristóbal Rojas School (1974-1978), studied photography in Cannes, France and cinema in Caracas (1979-1980).

== Works ==
=== Developed Bodily Actions of the Cycle of Life ===
Yen and Nan are best known for Developed Bodily Actions on the Cycles of Life, such as birth and transfiguration, and also on the elements of nature: water, earth and air. They created events that involved the natural landscape of Venezuela, as in "Salinas de Araya," one of their most emblematic works that also inspired the feature film by Margot Benecerraf. In the seventies and eighties, the duo collaborated with other creators of performances who worked on the rituals of Venezuelan national being, communication, passion and violence. Yeni and Nan, along with Antoinette Sosa, were the only women of those creators who were recognized at the time. They paid more attention to the inner life and the psycho-physical transformations of their anatomies, acting with self-centered and meditative intensity to slowly recreate the internal and external rhythms in their bodies. They were influenced by martial arts, psychology, theater, dance and cinema. In the early 1980s, their work "Integraciones en Agua" (Integrations in Water, 1980) and "Transfiguración Elemento Tierra" (Earth Element Transfiguration, 1983) challenged the conventions and traditional forms of art, using their own bodies and senses in action as avenues of aesthetic representation in the search for direct, sensory and participatory art.

Yeni and Nan present collections related to the innermost being, approaching the body. According to María Elena Ramos, curator of some of their exhibitions, the works "support at the same time ecological, plastic and poetic."

In 1980, with the body as a central element, Yeni and Nan presented Presences and Art Artist (GAN), a metallic skeleton of a cube. They sought to employ the language of gesture and movement to express the unification of the internal space that has to break down to achieve the liberating experience of outer space. In 1981, with Integraciones en Agua, they participated in the XVI Bienal de São Paulo. The performance allowed them to assemble a visual, sound and tactile language. In the same year, in the Colloquium of Non-objectual Art organized in the Museum of Modern Art (Medellín, Colombia), they presented their Acción Divisoria del Espacio (Dividing Action of Space). In 1982 they performed Integraciones en Agua in the areas of the GAN and represented Venezuela in the Biennial of Young Artists of Paris (Museum of Modern Art of the City of Paris) with contemplative Integrations and Water Integrations II.

In 1983, in the Alternate Space of the GAN, they installed their video-performance, Transfiguración Elemento Tierra in the framework of the collective exhibition "Autorretrato – The artist as object-subject of art". In 1985, in the III National Salon of Young Artists of the MACC (an edition dedicated to installations), they participated with Man and Salt, for which they won first prize. The same installation (expanded) was represented at the La Rinconada Art Museum, Caracas, under the title Symbolism of Crystallization: Man-Salt II the last presentation made by Yeni and Nan in the framework of the exhibition, "Nature in Three Times".

In April 2010, at Faría + Fábregas Galería, they presented a conceptualist sample consisting of a group of photographs, polaroids and videos that record the central performances and actions developed by the artists, titled Water, Salt, Land (Bodily Actions 1978/1986). The exhibition presents a selection of images of some of the artists' bodily events. Through the metaphor, their gestures of immersion in the water give an image and memory of the natural cycles of origin, and their slow movements refer both to the extent of the seas in which life arose and to the concentration in the containers of plastic that narrow their movement before reaching their exit to light. The damp layer of earth that surrounds their faces, and which dries out shows human fragility and at the same time that of the planet, its dangers of drought, infertility and extinction. Several of the pieces that make up the exhibits were recorded in U-matic format and edited by the artists with two Betamax and a homemade Moviola.

The collaboration of gallery owner, Henrique Faria, who had ordered the work, and the recovery of images from journalist Margarita D'Amico, is structured in five sections that show 56 works, mostly photography and video.

The first one, called "Birth," presents its beginnings, with images of its stage of European formation; followed by "Identity" that shows the interest of these artists, according to Murría, more than in the finished work, in "the process and experimentation, the artistic experience for them and for the public". "Land" and "Water" present the interest of both for the essential and the natural. The tour ended in Araya, a name that refers to Venezuelan salt mines, where they were videotaped and photographed. They donated a collection of 66 images of this performance to the CAAC.

"It's wonderful to get together again," said Nan, on her arrival from Venezuela, in reference to the fact that more than thirty years before these artists took different paths — Yeni had moved to Salamanca. The reunion also served to close a circle, since at the inauguration they presented a new performance, Fire, an element of strength, purity and transformation.

== Exhibitions ==
- 1979 "Birth I and II," Ángel Boscán Gallery
- 1980 "Presencias," GAN: With the body as a central element, they present Presences and Art as part of "Bipedal Art: A Venezuelan Review of the Language of Action" (GAN), a metallic skeleton, where both artists sought to develop, through the language of gestures and movements, the unification of the internal space that one wishes to break to reach the liberating experience of outer space.
- 1981 Biennial of São Paulo: With "Integraciones en Agua," they participated in the XVI Bienal de São Paulo. On that occasion, the performance allowed them to assemble a visual, sound and tactile language.
- 1981 Non-Objectual Art Colloquium, Museum of Modern Art of Medellín: At the Non-Objectual Art Colloquium organized at the Museum of Modern Art in Medellin, Colombia, Yeni and Nan presented their Dividing Action of Space.
- 1982 "Integraciones Contemplativas", GAN
- 1982 Biennial of Young Artists of Paris, Museum of Modern Art of Paris: They represented Venezuela in the Biennial of Young Artists of Paris (Museum of Modern Art of the City of Paris) with contemplative Integrations and Integrations in Water II.
- 1983 "Transfiguration of the Earth Element," Sala Mendoza: In the Alternate Space of the GAN, they installed their video-performance "Transfiguración, Elemento Tierra" in the framework of the collective exhibition "Autorretrato."
- 1985 III National Salon of Young Artists, Museum of Contemporary Art of Caracas: In the III Salon of Young Artists of the MACC (an edition dedicated to installations), they participated with Man and Salt, for which they obtained the first prize. The artistic action was an appropriation of nature, the use of Araya salt as a natural element that was transformed from invisible to visible, from soluble to solid, from transparent to white; as an element of nature interacted with the human being, which also undergoes metamorphosis, becoming raw material for artistic elaboration.
- 1986 La Rinconada Art Museum, Caracas: This same extended installation was represented in the La Rinconada Art Museum under the title of "Symbolism of Crystallization: Man-Salt II," the last presentation made by Yeni and Nan in the framework of the exhibition "Nature in Three Times."
- 2010 Yeni y Nan: El Agua, La Salina, La Tierra (Acciones Corporales, 1978/1986), Faría+Fábregas Galería, Caracas
- 2014 Body: Air, Water, and Earth, Henrique Faria, New York
- 2015 Folding: Line, Space & Body/ Latin American Women Artists Working Around Abstraction; Henrique Faria, New York
- 2016 Subverting the Feminine: Latin American (Re)Marks on the Female Body; Y Gallery
- 2018 Yeni & Nan, Henrique Faria, New York

== Collections ==
1. Brooklyn Museum of Art
2. Henrique Faria, New York.
3. CAAC
4. GAN
5. MACCSI
6. MBA
7. MoMA

== Recognition ==
- 1985 First prize, III National Salon of Young Artists, Caracas
- 1988 Honorable Mention, National Hall of Plastic Arts, GAN
- 1992 First prize of ephemeral art, III Biennial of Guayana
- 2001 Arturo Michelena Award, LIX Salon Arturo Michelena

== Bibliography ==
- Benko, Susana. "Yeni y Nan: El agua, la salina, la tierra." ArtNexus, no. 78 (September–November 2010). Yeni y Nan - ArtNexus.
- Calzadilla, Juan, and María Elena Ramos. Yeni y Nan: Evento de lenguajes de acción: Performance Art, 1979–1981. Caracas: Galeria de Arte Nacional, 1982.
- Ramos, María Elena. Acciones frente a la plaza: Reseñas y documentos de siete eventos para una nueva lógica del arte venezolano. Caracas: Fundarte, 1995.
- "Yeni and Nan: One's Body as a Body of the World." Henrique Faria, New York, 2013. Henrique Faria Fine Art - YENI & NAN: Body: Air, Water and Earth.
- Terán, Pedro, Jennifer Hackshaw, and María Luisa González. Naturaleza tres tiempos: Alerto Asprino, Pedro Terán, Yeni y Nan. Caracas: Museo de Arte la Rinconada, 1987
- La transestética postmoderna
- Varderi, A. (n.d.). A New York State of Mind.
- Rivas Dugarte, R. (1987). Bibliografía de las artes plásticas en Venezuela. Caracas: Instituto Universitario Pedagógico de Caracas.
- De Venezuela : treinta años de arte contemporáneo (1960-1990). (1992). Caracas: Ministerio de Relaciones Exteriores.
