= Patricia Van Dalen =

Patricia Van Dalen (born in 1955 in Maracaibo, Venezuela) is a visual artist of Venezuelan and Dutch heritage, living in Miami. Considered a key figure in Venezuelan art of the 1980s and 1990s, and with a career spanning over four decades, Van Dalen maintains a rigorous and consistent artistic practice. Her work is characterized by an ongoing exploration of color, structure, and fragmentation within abstraction, through painting, drawing, collage, printmaking, assemblage, sculptural and ephemeral site-specific installations, and the design of permanent artworks integrated into public and private architectural spaces.

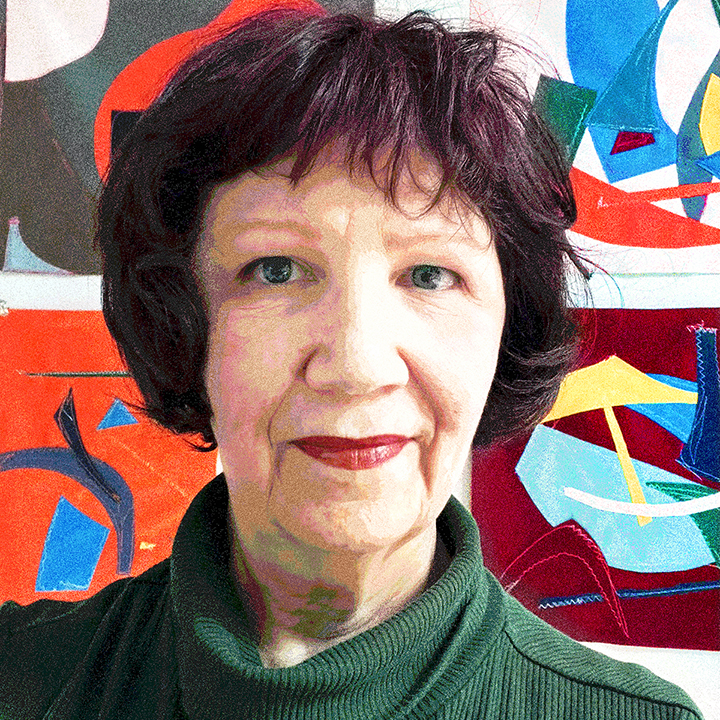

== Early life ==
Patricia Van Dalen was born in Maracaibo, in western Venezuela, to a Dutch father and a Venezuelan mother. After spending her early childhood in Maracaibo and the Netherlands, her family settled in Caracas in 1962. She graduated from high school in 1973 and completed a four-year graphic design program at the Instituto de Diseño Fundación Neumann-INCE in Caracas, graduating in 1977. Afterwards, Van Dalen worked as a designer at the Universidad Nacional Abierta.

Starting in 1980, Van Dalen began drawing and painting steadily. By 1983, she was exhibiting in national-scale salons across Venezuela. Her first solo exhibition took place in 1985 at Galería Minotauro in Caracas with paintings and drawings on paper.

Between 1980 and 1986, Van Dalen collaborated in Paris with Yaacov Agam on his educational program. After returning to Caracas, she joined the team at the Ministerio de Educación, where she coordinated the implementation of Agam’s experimental visual education method in several Venezuelan schools. She also served as faculty at the Instituto de Diseño, teaching Color I and II for several years.

Since the mid-1980s, Van Dalen has worked full-time as an artist. In 2011, she moved to the United States, where she continues her practice.

== Career ==
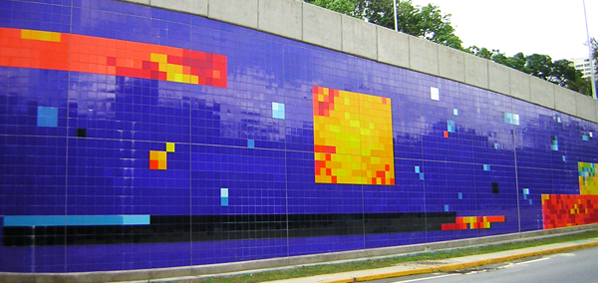
Jardín Lumínico of Patricia Van Dalen, Autopista de Prados del Este, Caracas, Venezuela

Van Dalen’s work has been exhibited since 1983 in a wide range of solo and group exhibitions in Venezuela and abroad. Her solo exhibitions include spaces such as Sala RG Centro Rómulo Gallegos, Sala Mendoza, Universidad Simón Bolívar, Sala TAC, La Caja-Centro Cultural Chacao in Caracas, as well as the Centro de Bellas Artes in Maracaibo. In 1992, she received First Prize (Two-Dimensional category) at the I Salón Nacional de Artes Visuales held at the Alejandro Otero Museum in Caracas. In 2011, she was awarded the 2010 Established Artist Award by the Venezuelan chapter of the International Association of Art Critics (AICA). Among other honors, she has been recognized at the Salón Michelena in Valencia, Venezuela; the Bienal Nacional de Arte de Guayana at the Museo de Arte Moderno Jesús Soto in Ciudad Bolívar; and the II Salón Christian Dior in Caracas. She also received First Prize in the competition for the integration of a large-scale mural on the Prados del Este highway, organized by the Baruta Municipality in Caracas.

Her work includes large-scale murals and permanent artistic interventions in public spaces, such as the 1,200 m² (12,900 sq ft) ceramic tile Mural Jardín Lumínico on the Prados del Este Highway and Mural Pajaritos, both in Caracas, as well as the glass mosaic floor of the main plaza Jardín de Calas in Río Caribe, eastern Venezuela. She has also completed numerous interventions in private residences in Venezuela and the U.S., working on walls, ceilings, rooftops, pool areas, and floors as part of the architectural and landscape design.

Van Dalen's interest in the social dimension of artistic production has led her to frequently incorporate installations and other ephemeral works into public spaces not originally designed for art. Examples include the Casa/Jardín/Ventanas intervention in the gardens, library façade, and interior spaces at Universidad Simón Bolívar in Caracas (1998); Jardín Lumínico, a site-specific installation at the Main Library of the Universidad Central de Venezuela (2001); the large-scale site-specific installation Luminous Gardens at Fairchild Tropical Botanic Garden in Coral Gables (2003), the inaugural project of the Art at Fairchild program; and Fragmented Light, an ephemeral intervention on the stairway walls of the Miller Learning Center at the University of Georgia in Athens, GA.

Her works across various media are included in numerous public and private collections. These include the Museum of Latin American Art (MoLAA) in Los Angeles, CA; Fairchild Tropical Botanic Garden and the University of Miami Institute for Data Science and Computing, both in Coral Gables, FL; the Christian Dior Collection in Paris; and several major museums in Venezuela, such as the Museo de Bellas Artes, Galería de Arte Nacional, Museo de Arte Contemporáneo, and Museo de Artes Visuales Alejandro Otero in Caracas, as well as the Centro de Arte de Maracaibo Lía Bermúdez. Additionally, her work forms part of the Colección Mercantil, a significant Venezuelan contemporary art collection with locations in Caracas and Panama.

Van Dalen began integrating art into architectural spaces in 1995 while in Venezuela—a practice she has continued in the U.S. since relocating, through lacquered wood assemblies, aluminum collages, rug designs, and a mural for a high-rise building in Miami (unbuilt). In 2014, she was commissioned to create Data Hall, a permanent site-specific installation for the University of Miami Institute for Data Science and Computing. The mural incorporates motherboards from Pegasus, UM’s first supercomputer, which she altered with plastic lacings that crisscross and converge into nodes, forming a scale-free network. These drawings communicate Van Dalen’s interest in combining aesthetically compatible materials to produce paradoxical images, while offering a tactile and visual approach to understanding data processing.

Once in Miami, Van Dalen explored photography to develop unusual bodies of work, showcased in two solo exhibitions: High Voltage (2013) and Ride the Rail (2017), both at ArtMedia Gallery. Her early studies of photography in the 1970s informed these explorations, enabling her to create new artistic configurations that resonate with her earlier productions while remaining distinct. Van Dalen has also developed special projects such as OPERATIVO GRAPAS (2016), a one-day interactive solo exhibition in Wynwood, Miami; Abstract Cabinet: Duo Project (2018), a collaborative installation with Emilio Narciso at Imago Art in Coral Gables; and (En)grapadas (2019), a solo exhibition of stapled collages at Cesta República in Madrid. In 2019, she was invited to create a collection of modern tiles at the Iznik Foundation in eastern Turkey, contributing to the preservation and contemporary reinterpretation of traditional Iznik ceramic techniques. More recently, she completed a site-specific installation as the 2023 Beyer Artist in Residence at the Society of the Four Arts in Palm Beach. Since 2016, Van Dalen has created work influenced by external factors—such as bureaucracy, spatial limitations, and physical constraints—developing a visual language grounded in adaptation, persistence, and restraint.

Since 1986, Van Dalen has conducted workshops and courses exploring the dynamics of visual language in various formats. She has taught at the Instituto de Diseño Fundación Neumann, the Architecture School of the Central University of Venezuela, and cultural institutions such as the Museo de Artes Visuales Alejandro Otero, and Fundación Villa Planchart (El Cerrito) in Caracas. Her courses have covered topics including Color (Levels I and II), and Color Dynamics. More recently, in 2019, 2020, and 2021, she led art workshops at Miami Dade College as a Special Guest Artist, and at The Society of the Four Arts in Palm Beach. Currently, Van Dalen teaches visual culture both in her studio and online.
