= Deborah Castillo =

Venezuelan artist

- Born: Deborah Castillo; 1971 (age 54–55); Caracas, Venezuela
- Education: Armando Reverón School of Plastic Arts; London College of Fashion
- Known for: Performance art, Sculpture, Photography, Video art
- Notable work: El beso emancipador (2013), Demagogue (2015), Marx Palimpsest (2018)
- Style: Political critique, Performance art
- Awards: Salón Award of Youth; Eugenio Mendoza Award (2003)

Deborah Castillo (born Caracas, Venezuela, 1971) is a Venezuelan artist who currently resides in Mexico. She is known for her controversial works, which challenge the chauvinism of many historical and contemporary political icons. Castillo has explored various artistic media, including video, photography, sculpture, and performance art, disciplines that she intertwines to create complex works that make political statements. Her oeuvre reflects on the persistence of patriarchal power and challenges the heroic and messianic epic.

== Education ==
Deborah Castillo studied plastic arts and sculpture at the Armando Reverón School of Plastic Arts (now integrated into the Universidad Nacional Experimental de las Artes) and has been active on the art scene since 2003, when she earned two awards in the city of Caracas: the Salón award of Youth and the Eugenio Mendoza award. She studied photography at the Organización Nelson Garrido and worked as an assistant to Nelson Garrido during the period 2000-2003. Castillo also studied at the London College of Fashion in 2004. Castillo's artist residencies include The Banff Center's Artist in Residence Program in Visual Arts (2015); the Atlantic Center for the Arts #151, New Smyrna Beach, Florida (2014); and the London Print Studio, UK (2007).

== Work ==
The most constant feature in Deborah Castillo's work is her own body, which she uses to make social and political critiques. Many of her performances and installations challenge male authority and political figures by using eroticism to question the dominance of individual male heroic figures in the public imagination and proposing critical making as an effective form of subversion. In Emancipatory Kiss (2013), a performance piece, she repeatedly kisses the face of the gold-colored bust of Venezuelan liberator Símon Bolívar. In Demagogue (2015), also a performance video, she masturbates the nose of a clay military figure. Art critic Irina Troconis has identified the military figure Castillo so often singles out as the subject of her criticism as the caudillo: "Though the head’s identity was never explicitly revealed, there was no mystery regarding what it represented; the frown, the beard, and the military epaulettes gave it the authoritative air of the caudillo, and brought to mind the boundless power historically embedded in that figure and its many visual iterations in the urban and political landscape of Latin America." In particular, Castillo challenges Hugo Chavez's Bolívarian Revolution in Venezuela by attacking Bolívar. In works such as Sisifo (2013), she destroys a bust of Bolívar, and in Slapping Power (2015), she slaps two wet clay busts of military figures. Art historian Sara Garzón has compared Castillo's "iconoclastic" pieces that attack effigies of Bolívar to social protest movements that topple monuments; the artist trivializes the heroic image while performing civil disobedience. Her 2018 exhibition, "Parricidios," at El Museo de Arte Carrillo Gil (MACG) in Mexico City featured Las Dictadoras (2017), a sculptural configuration of five female bodies that parodied the five iconic male leaders Mao ZeDong, Joseph Stalin, Karl Marx, Vladimir Lenin and Fidel Castro. Castillo was forced to leave Venezuela, at one point going into hiding, because its totalitarian regime censored her artwork and its political critiques.
