= Seka Severin de Tudja =

Venezuelan artist (1923–2007)

Seka (1923–2007) was a Venezuelan ceramicist. Born in Zagreb, Croatia (then Yugoslavia), she later became known as Seka and worked in Caracas, Venezuela.

== Education ==
Seka studied sculpture at the Academy of Fine Arts in Zagreb under Frano Krsinic and Krsto Hegedusic from 1942 to 1945. She then received a scholarship from the French government to study in Paris from 1946 to 1948. In Paris, she continued her studies in sculpture and drawing at the Académie de la Grande Chaumière and earned a degree in art history and archaeology from the Sorbonne in 1948.

== Career ==
In Paris, Seka experimented with materials and processes, including creating animations with wax figurines and working in a ceramic button workshop, which deepened her technical understanding of the medium. She moved to Caracas in 1952, where she initially continued making utilitarian objects while exploring firing techniques with her new kiln. Although her early Venezuelan work was varied, she exhibited a ceramic bas-relief mural at the 1955 XVI Salón Oficial Annual de Arte Venezolano (Official Annual Venezuelan Art Salon), receiving the National Prize for Applied Arts. Seka was awarded gold medals at the Exposition Internationale, les émaux dans la céramique actuelle (International Exhibition: Current Ceramic Enamels) at the Musée Ariana in Geneva (1965) and the exhibition Form und Qualität (Form and Quality) in Munich (1967). She also received diplomas at the International Exhibition of Ceramics at the Victoria and Albert Museum in London (1972) and the World Triennial of Fine Ceramics in Zagreb (1984). Her first solo exhibition, Treinta y cinco cerámicas de Seka (Thirty-Five Ceramics by Seka), was organized by Miguel Arroyo in 1962 at the Museo de Bellas Artes (Caracas). This exhibition brought her international attention, leading to her representing Venezuela in exhibitions abroad. Two major retrospectives followed in Caracas at the Museo de Arte Contemporáneo (1982) and the Centro Cultural Consulado (1993). Seka's work was featured in numerous international group exhibitions throughout her career.

== Artwork ==
Her early Venezuelan works incorporated pre-Columbian-inspired figures. Later works moved away from ornamentation, focusing instead on process, medium, form, texture, and color. After 1972, Seka explored solid ovoid forms, further integrating ceramic practice with sculptural principles.

== Exhibitions ==
- Treinta y cinco cerámicas de Seka (Thirty-Five Ceramics by Seka), Museo de Bellas Artes (Caracas), Caracas, 1962 (Solo exhibition).
- Museo de Arte Contemporáneo, Caracas, 1982 (Retrospective).
- Centro Cultural Consulado, Caracas, 1993 (Retrospective).
- Exposition Internationale, les émaux dans la céramique actuelle (International Exhibition: Current Ceramic Enamels), Musée Ariana (The Swiss Museum of Ceramics and Glass), Geneva, 1965.
- Form und Qualität (Form and Quality), Munich, 1967.
- International Exhibition of Ceramics, Victoria and Albert Museum, London, 1972.
- World Triennial of Fine Ceramics, Zagreb, 1984.
- Moderno: Design for Living in Brazil, Mexico, and Venezuela, Americas Society, New York, 2015.
