= Daniella Isamit Morales =

Chilean-Venezuelan artist (born 1982)

Daniella Morales
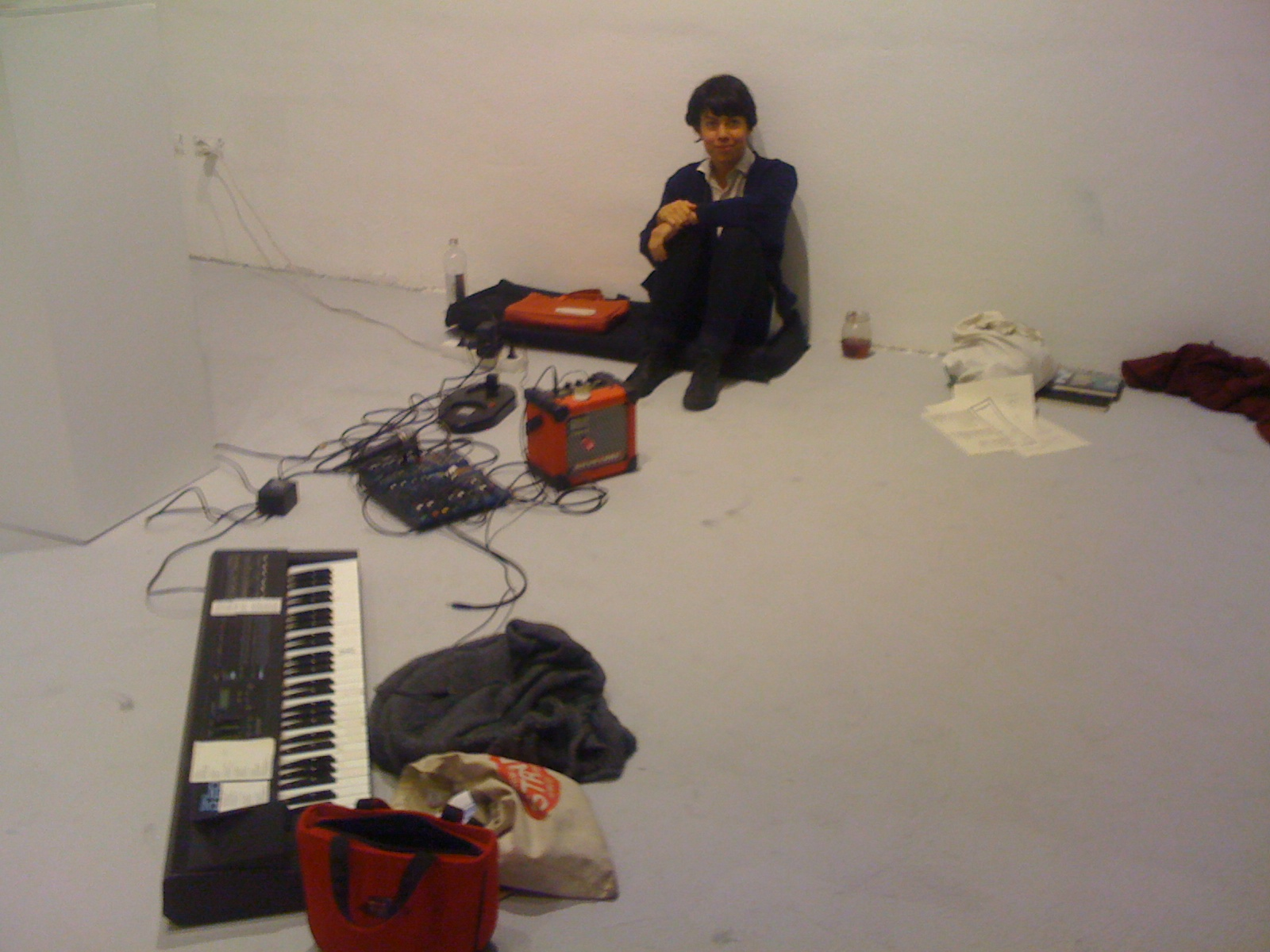
- Vecchio Merda Danzband performance with Daniella Isamit Morales during a FRAC exhibition at the Pistoletto Foundation in Italy, 2012

Background information
- Born: 1982 (age 43–44); Caracas, Capital, Venezuela
- Genres: Electronic
- Occupations: Artist, musician, DJ
- Website: www.isamitmorales.com

Daniella Isamit Morales (born 1982) is a Chilean–Venezuelan artist, musician, and DJ who was born in Caracas, Venezuela. Morales' work has been shown at Pulse Miami Contemporary Art Fair and Lucie Fontaine Gallery/art employer in Milan.

== Themes and works ==
Morales's practice is focused on the notion of identity and how this notion can be stretched, redefined and de-structured. Her projects are often characterized by controversy, as many artworks document different research based on topics like authorship, fiction, signature, identity, disappearance, shifting personality and public persona in relationship to media, whether they are an act of confession from her adolescent fantasies or the concept of beating hired men, the latter bringing her unexpected fame in the Italian tabloid media in addition to the self-proclaimed therapy.

=== Vecchio Merda Danzband ===
She is one of the members of Vecchio Merda Danzband, an all-female group of artists consisting of Lia Cecchin, Lindsay Benedict and Lisa Perrucci, which is a weekly meeting with changing projects in music, dance, cooking, videos, intervention, games, walks, and other media.

Depending on the cycle of the moon, Vecchio Merda Danzband fluctuates in medium but always mines heartbreak culture. Precariously formed in Turin, Italy in 2012, they were commissioned by Centrale Fies to perform a traditional-style concert. With their lack of technical expertise but wealth of enthusiasm, they created melancholy pieces, instructional dance steps and purposeless karaoke for the SUPERLIKERS concert. The core members speak in three different languages and through the struggle to communicate, surprises, mistakes and magic are made. This perilous structure is coupled with their determination to explore the emotionally disruptive actions of love that forces a slowing down of industrial time. Typically, VMDB artworks fight to amplify relationships towards deeper intimacies and stimulate renegotiations of attachments. Love, being the Danzband's main theme, can be a real modifier of ideology and an effective way of stimulating political movement. A broken heart can slow down productivity in a capitalist system. For this reason, the Danzband sees value in instability, crises, and resistance.

=== No Title, No Author ===
In 2011, Morales decided to take the identity of another person, which name remains mysterious, substituting her in daily actions like going to school and meeting friends. Through this substitution the artist injected fiction into reality but also generated a double reality, creating an artificial situation in which the same person could be at the same time in two different places. Furthermore, this act becomes a subtle critique of how in our reality human relationships can be manipulated and shaped at our convenience. Documenting this act is a printed matter made 'in collaboration' – here four hands become two – with the person she substituted.

=== The Monster No 2 Patrimony ===
A Mediatic Performance in 2010, Morales began to post flyers around Milan offering money to men if they would allow her to beat them. The flyer attracted the attention of an Italian journalist who contacted her for an interview, which was then manipulated and published in the Italian tabloid magazines Vero and Visto. The article then attracted the attention of the writers of Pomeriggio 5, a talk show broadcast by Silvio Berlusconi's TV company, whose official target consists of old people and housewives. I decided to perform the character presented in those magazines. The fact that I am an artist was never mentioned. Eventually that appearance on the TV talk show generated another "media presence" on the famous Italian TV show called Striscia la notizia, which is a parody of the week's news and was one of the first examples of "Italian entertainment TV" brought to Italy by Berlusconi in the 1980s. In Striscia la Notizia I was ranked "Monster Number 2" in a top ten of media freaks, leading me to title the work "Monster N° 2 Patrimony".

This patrimony includes:

1. Email from the first journalist
2. Visto N°31, August 2010 (magazine)
3. Vero N°29, September 2010 (magazine)
4. Email including the invitation to go on TV
5. "Pomeriggio 5" 29 September (video)
6. "Striscia la Notizia" 1 October (video)
7. 92 emails that the monster received asking for her services
8. Internet blogs

=== "Confession of Imagined Orgasms from 1990 to 1992" (2010) ===
The artist went to a church in Italy and confessed to a priest a sin she made when she was 9. The sin, related to the artist's childish attempt to understand what an orgasm meant, came after she read a book on sexual education, which was given to her by her father when she was 9. Underlining the cathartic nature of Daniella Isamit Morales's practice, as well as her desire to create alternative timelines, this project was presented as a video work: the images were taken by her father during the artist's first communion which was taken without confessing the sin; the audio is the recording of her confessing the infamous sin.

== Exhibitions ==
- "Domesticity V," exhibition at Lucie Fontaine.
- "SUPERLIKERS", Vecchio Merda Danzband at Centrale Fies in Dro, ITALY.
- "SPRINT", Spazio O' Milan, curated by Dafne Boggeri. (2013)
- "La Biblioteca Fantastica", MAN di Nuoro, Sardinia, Italy at CHERIMUS SARDEGNA. (2013)
- "Les Associations Libres", La Maison Rouge, Paris curated by Chiara Parisi, Nicola Setari and Francesca di Nardo. (2012)
- "80," Gum Studio, Turin. (2012)
- "Estate", Marianne Boesky, New York curated by Lucie Fontaine. (2012)
- "Ulaz", Cavallerizza Reale, Turin, Italy curated by Alessandro Carrer and Bruno Barsanti. (2012)
- "Ogni Donna Sono Io", Spazio Corale, Milan curated by Sara Errico and Francesca Guerisoli. (2012)
- "Start Point Prize", Wannieck Gallery, Brno, Czech Republic, curated by Pavel Vancat. (2011)
