= Alirio Palacios =

Venezuelan visual artist

Alirio Palacios (December 7, 1938 – September 11, 2015) was a Venezuelan visual artist known for his drawings, graphic designing, printmaking and sculpture. Horse figures were often motifs of his graphic art and sculpture, an obsession he developed during his long stay in China. Among other awards, Palacios won the National Prize of Plastic Arts of Venezuela in 1977. His work is on display in museums and public sites internationally, including the presidential Palace and the National Supreme Court in Caracas, the Casa de Las Américas in Havana, and the University of Edinburgh where Palacio's portrait of the first Venezuelan President José María Vargas is on permanent display.

== Education and career ==
He was born near Tucupita, Delta Amacuro. As a child, Palacios began painting in his hometown by the Orinoco River, depicting animal figures with chalk on blackboards from his mother's and aunt's school. At sixteen, he began studies at the Caracas School of Fine Arts (Venezuela), where he graduated in 1960. Palacios traveled to Europe representing his home country at the VII Youth Festival in Vienna, Austria (1960). He undertook further painting studies at the Academy of Fine Arts, Rome, Italy (1961) and also studied water base engraving techniques at the University of Fine Arts in Beijing, China, where he was tutored by Li Hua and Li Co Yan, graduating in 1969. He was later an Intern at the Academy of Art in Berlin, Germany (1968–1970), and studied Printmaking at the University of Warsaw, Poland. From 1985 he resided in New York for 20 years, during which he pursued his art career and also acted as a cultural adviser to the Venezuelan Consulate. He then moved back to his home country, where he was widely revered. He authored many books on his own work, and illustrated several literature books by other authors.

He acknowledged Piero della Francesca, the Italian Renaissance Master, as an influence on his work.

Palacios died in Caracas of heart failure in 2015.

== Awards ==
- 1957 Graphic Art Prize, Poster section, Escuela de Artes Plásticas y Applicadas, Caracas
- 1959 Second Prize for Drawing, First National Exhibition of Drawaing and Engraving, Faculty of Architecture and Urbanism, Central University of Venezuela, UCV
- 1960 Third Prize, I Salón de las Artes Applicadas, Casa de la Cultura, Maracay, Venezuela
- 1961
  - Prize Henrique Otero Vizcarrondo, XXII Salón Arturo Michelena, Valencia, Venezuela
  - Roma Prize, XXII Salón Arturo Michelena
  - Prize Arturo Michelena (shared with Armando Pérez), XIX Salón Arturo Michelena, Valencia, Venezuela
- 1964 Second Prize, III Salón Aragua, Casa de la Cultura, Maracay, Venezuela
- 1966 Roma Prize, XXVII Salón Oficial / Gold Medal, Graphic Art Biennial, Barranquilla, Colombia
- 1967
  - Roma Prize, XXVIII Salón Oficial Arturo Michelena, Valencia, Venezuela
  - First Prize, V Salón Aragua, Casa de la Cultura, Maracay, Venezuela
  - First Prize, IX Salón Nacional de Dibujo y Grabado, Facultad de Arquitectura y Urbanismo, UCV
- 1968
  - Prize Fundación Mendoza, X Salón Nacional de Dibujo y Grabado, Facultad de Arquitectura y Urbanismo, UCV
  - Prize Emil Friedman, XXIX Salón Arturo Michelena, Valencia, Venezuela
- 1971
  - Gold Medal, First Graphic Art Biennial de Cali, Colombia
  - Acquisition Prize, I Salón Nacional de Jóvenes Artistas, Casa de la Cultura, Maracay
  - Gold Medal, III International Graphic Art Biennial, Florencia, Italia
- 1976 Job Fellowship, Salón Las Artes Plásticas en Venezuela, Fine Art Museum (MBA)
- 1977 Venezuelan National Prize for Fine Arts, Caracas
- 1980 First Prize, II Salón del Dibujo Actual en Venezuela, Fundarte
- 1981
  - Acquisition Prize, I Biennial of Visual Arts, Fine Art Museum, Caracas
  - Prize Andrés Pérez Mujica, XXXIX Salón Arturo Michelena, Valencia, Venezuela
- 1984
  - International Prize Flavio de Carvalho, I Biennial, Havana, Cuba
  - Prize Ciudad de La Habana, I Biennial, Havana, Cuba

== Permanent collections ==
- Museum of Arts, Carabobo State, Venezuela
- Casa de las Américas, Havana, Cuba
- Centro de Estudios Latinoamericanos, CELARG, Caracas
- Contemporary Art Museum, Caracas
- National Art Gallery, Caracas, Venezuela
- Highway Museum for Peace, binational highway connecting Cúcuta, in northeast Colombia, to San Antonio del Táchira, in southwest Venezuela
- Miraflores Palace, Jose Maria Vargas Portrait
- Venezuelan Central Bank, Caracas

A wider list of collections reported to show works by Alirio Palacios includes: Galería Municipal de Arte, Puerto La Cruz, Central University of Venezuela, Beijing University School of Arts, Academy of Fine Arts in Warsaw, National Museum, Warsaw, Brooklyn Museum, Association of Plastic Arts in Shanghai, Centre Genevois de Gravure Contemporaine and Musée d’Art et d’Histoire (Geneva).

== Art market ==
Many of Palacios's works have been successfully sold at auctions by Sotheby's and Christie's in New York City, Hotel des Ventes in Geneve, and Odalys in Caracas. The artist is listed in important reference sources such as The Encyclopedia of Latin American and Caribbean Art.

== Bibliography ==
195? - Palacios A & Rabinowicz A : Miscellaneous Ephemeral Material

1957 - Subero E, Palacios A, Palacios L: Isla de Luz sobre el amor anclada: poemas

1967 - Palacios L & Palacios A: Tarde a temprano, poemas

1968 - Urdaneta J: Momentos Hostiles: Diseño Gráfico

1979 - Palacios A: Fábulas

1984 - Palacios A: Manchas de Asombro Author: Alirio Palacios

1986 - Palacios A: New Works on Paper

1986 - Arraiz A & Palacios A: Memorias del Latifundio

1988 - Palacios A: Recent Work on Paper

1988 - Palacios A, Apparitions

1993 - Entre lo Real y sus Signos

1999 - Palacios A: Xilografías y Concretografías
