= Mario Abreu =

Venezuelan artist (1919–1993)

- Mario Abreu
- Born: Mario Abreu; August 22, 1919; Turmero, Venezuela
- Died: February 20, 1993 (aged 73); Caracas, Venezuela
- Education: Caracas School of Fine and Applied Arts
- Known for: Painting, magical objects
- Notable work: Magic Objects series
- Style: Magical realism, symbolism
- Movement: Contemporary Venezuelan art
- Awards: National Prize for Painting (1951), National Prize of Plastic Arts of Venezuela (1975), Armando Reverón Award (1985)

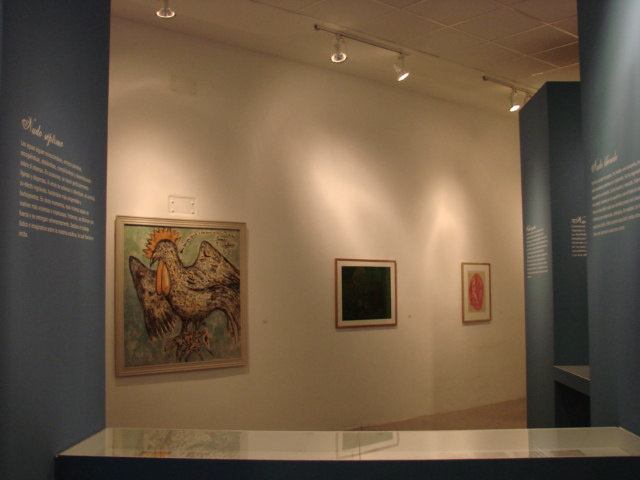
Mario Abreu's works

Mario Abreu (August 22, 1919 - February 20, 1993) was a Venezuelan artist known as the "master of magic objects".

== Biography ==
Abreu was born in 1919 in Turmero, Venezuela.

Competent in drawing since childhood, Abreu made his first drawings aged 9 and 10, when he painted his first landscapes, and moved to Caracas at a young age. He worked as a laborer in Casa Benzo while studying at night to finish his primary education. Later he attended night school from 9 to 11 pm at the Caracas School of Fine and Applied Arts, directed by Antonio Monsantos. In 1942, after winning a painting competition and winning a scholarship worth 100 bolivars per month, he was able to leave work and attend the day courses at the same school, from which he graduated in 1947. He participated in the Free Art Workshop, founded the year after his graduation.

In 1951, Mario Abreu received the National Prize for Painting at the XII Annual Official Hall Venezuelan Art, allowing him to get a scholarship to continue studies in Europe. Between 1952 and 1961 he lived in Paris, where he developed an intense intellectual life and began a new phase of his work.

He returned to Caracas in 1961.

In 1967 he exhibited in the São Paulo Biennale.

In 1975 he received the National Prize of Plastic Arts of Venezuela and in 1985, Armando Reveron Award, granted by the Venezuelan Association of Artists.

In 1983, he represented Venezuela at the São Paulo Biennial, and in 1993 he was Venezuela's representative for the Venice Biennial.

After his death, the Museum of Visual Arts in Maracay was renamed the Museo de Arte Contemporáneo de Maracay Mario Abreu (MACMA).
