= Venezuelan art =

Art of Venezuela

Venezuelan art has a long history. Initially dominated by religious motifs, art in Venezuela began emphasizing historical and heroic representations in the late 19th century, a move led by Martín Tovar y Tovar. Modernism took over in the 20th century. Notable Venezuelan artists include Arturo Michelena, Cristóbal Rojas, Armando Reverón, Manuel Cabré, the kinetic artists Jesús-Rafael Soto and, the Meta-realism artist Pajaro and Yucef Merhi.

== Museums in Venezuela ==
- The National Art Gallery in Caracas has the most comprehensive collection of 19th century paintings in the country, including works such as "Miranda Carraca the" by Arturo Michelena, as well as other works of academic painting and traveling artists of the 19th century. It is on Mexico Avenue in La Candelaria district, between the stations Bellas Artes and Parque Carabobo.
- The Museum of Fine Arts opened in Caracas on February 20, 1938. It has a permanent collection with work classified as: European Medieval and Modern Art, Contemporary Art European and North American Cubism and similar trend s in Latin American art (painting and sculpture), Drawings and Prints, Egyptian Art and Ceramics.
- Museum of Contemporary Art of Caracas (MACC). This is one of Venezuela's major museums, opened on 20 February 1974. It has presented exhibitions of national and international visual artists of painting, sculpture, drawing, film, video, and photography. It contains 17 rooms located in Central Park, near the Teresa Carreño Theatre, as well as a cabinet paper, a comprehensive art library, a creative workshop, a media room, a gallery, and a sculpture garden. Its portfolio consists of more than 3,000 works, including "Odalisque in red pants" by Henri Matisse, "lesson Sky" by Joan Miró, "Portrait of Dora Maar" Pablo Picasso, "Carnival Night" by Marc Chagall, and works by Reverón, Jean Arp, Victor Vasarely, Auguste Rodin, Magdalena Abakanowicz, Jacobo Borges and Fernando Botero.
- Contemporary Art Museum Jesús Soto. This avant-garde museum was established by Soto to promote Venezuelan art and culture. The building was designed by Carlos Raúl Villanueva. The museum displays works from Soto's personal collection, built up during the 1950s and 1960s during his stay in Europe.
- Museum of Contemporary Art of Zulia (Maczul). This museum was inaugurated on 24 October 1998 and its permanent collection consists of works by various expressive genres created by artists first row.

== Venezuelan artists ==
- Milton Becerra
- Jacobo Borges
- Carlos Cruz-Díez
- Mateo Manaure (1926 - 2018)
- Arturo Michelena
- Tito Salas
- Martín Tovar y Tovar
- Juan Lovera
- Cristóbal Rojas
- Antonio Herrera Toro (1857 - 1914)
- Armando Reverón
- Alejandro Otero
- Jesus Soto
- Marisol Escobar
- Yucef Merhi
- Manuel Cabré
- Rafael Parra Toro
- Francisco Narváez
- Patricia Van Dalen

== Gallery ==
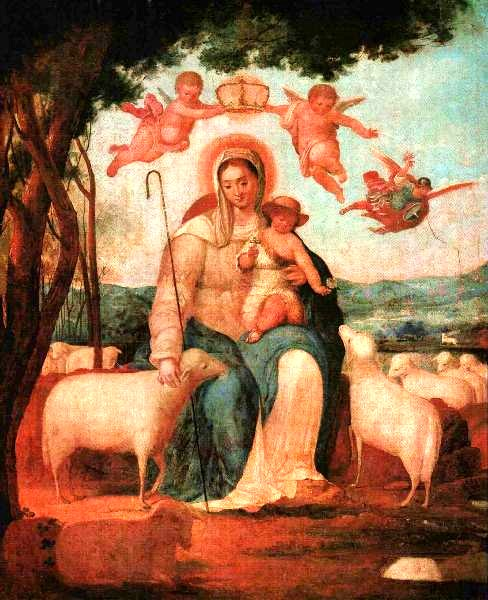
La Divina Pastora, Juan Lovera, Galeria de Arte Nacional

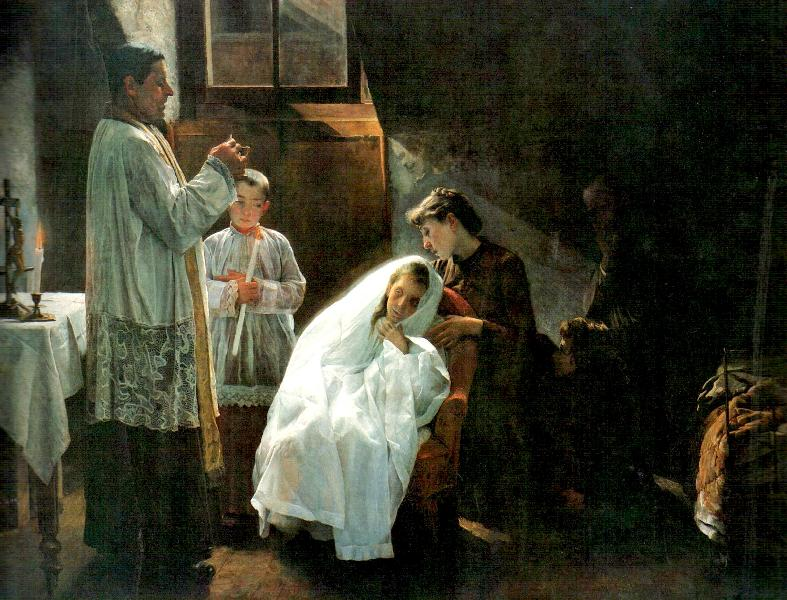
Estudio para Dante Beatriz, 1889 Cristóbal Rojas, Coleccion the Galería de Arte Nacional, Caracas - Venezuela

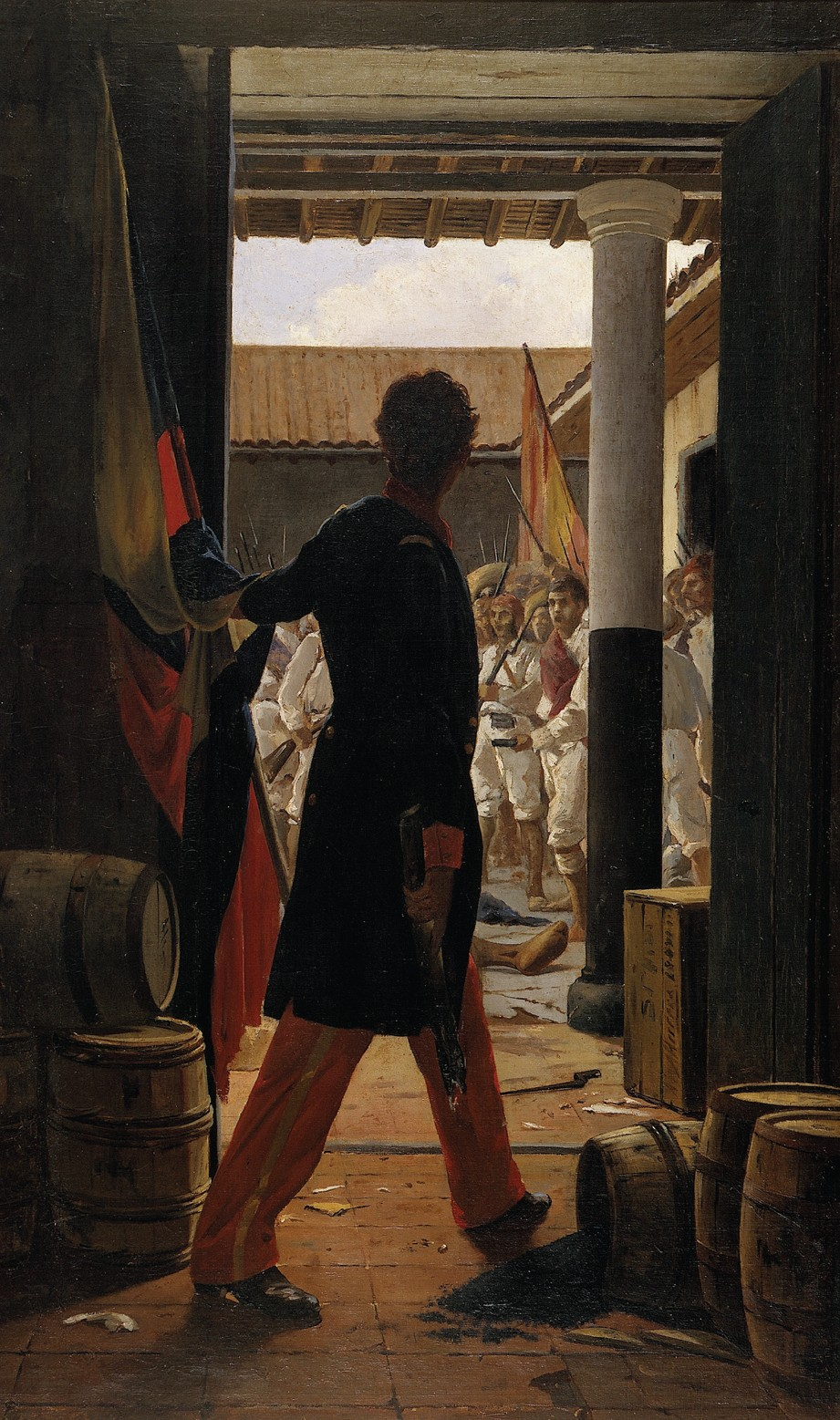
Antonio Herrera Toro, Ricaurte in San Mateo, 1898, Galeria de Arte Nacional, Caracas - Venezuela

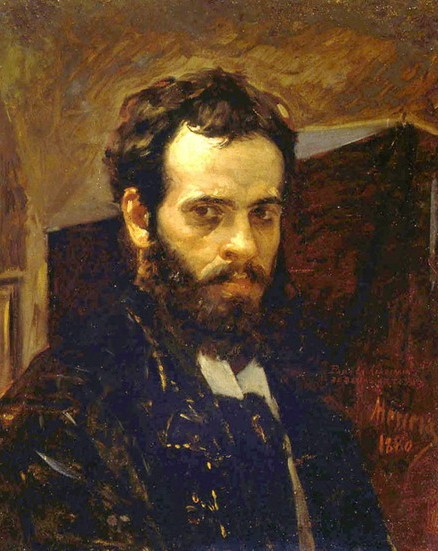
Antonio Herrera Toro, Self Portrait, 1880

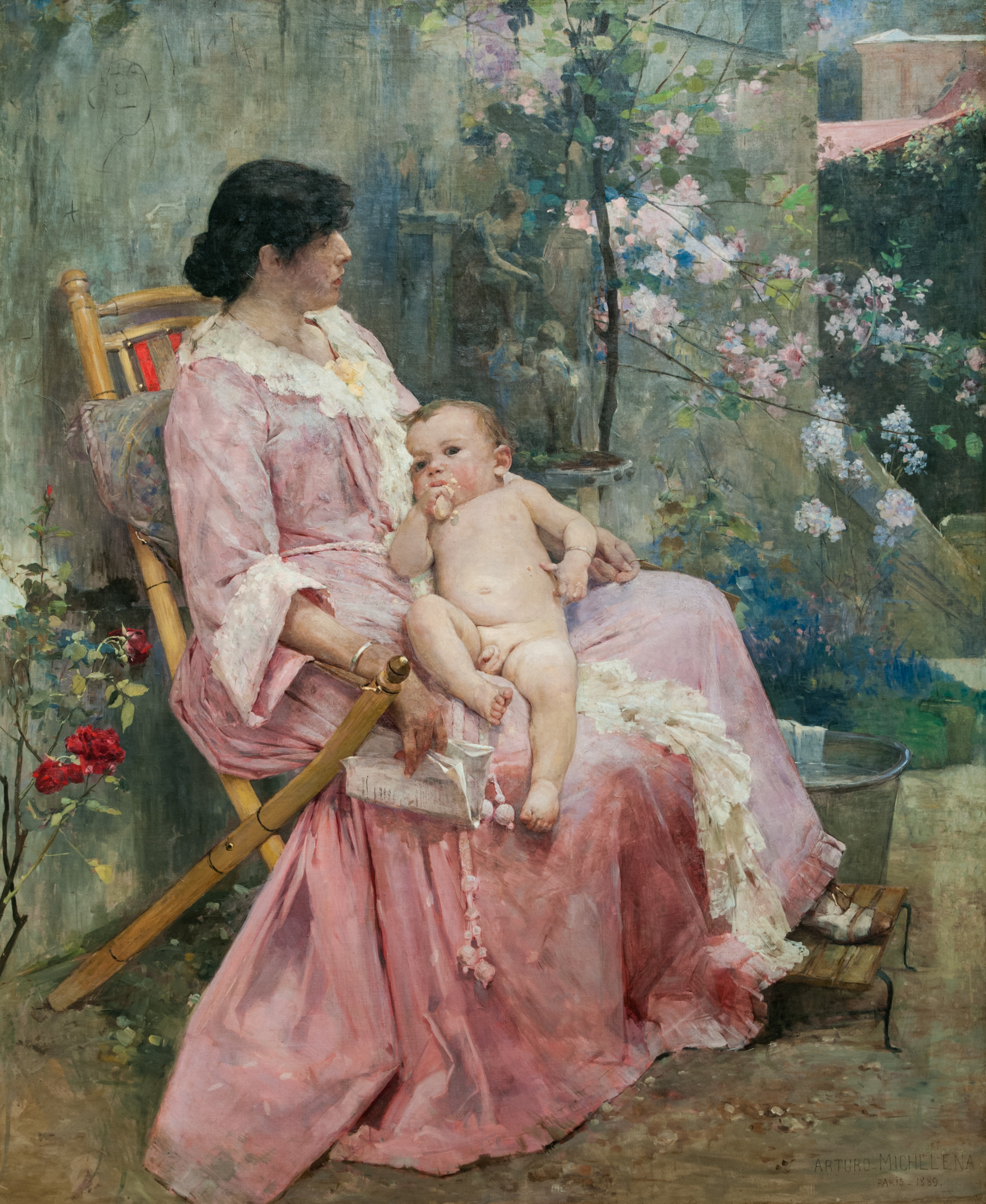
La Joven Madre (Young Mother), by Arturo Michelena, 1889
