= Palacio Municipal de Caracas =

City hall of Caracas, Venezuela

Coordinates: 10°30′19.4″N 66°54′54.0″W

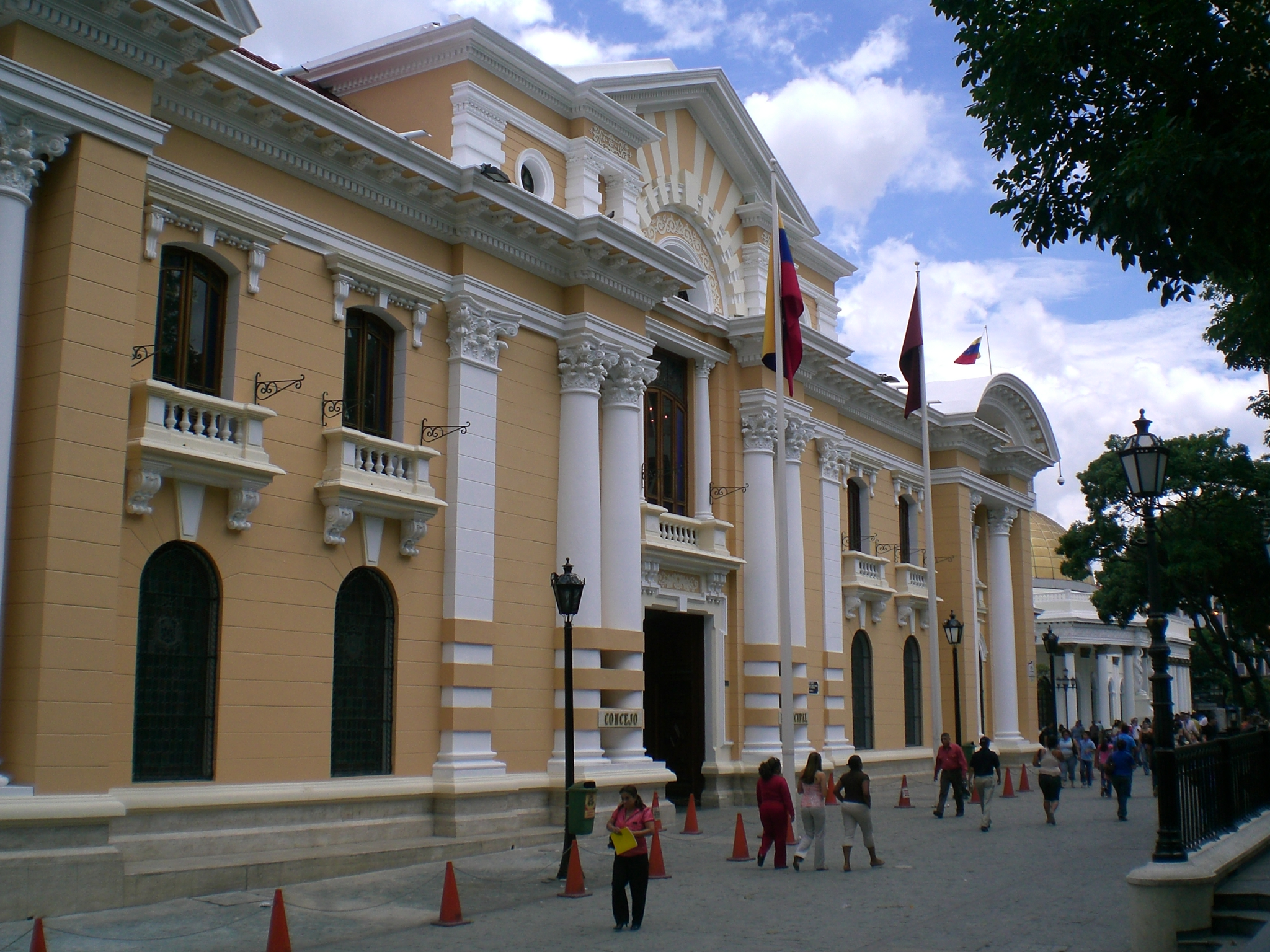
Palacio Municipal de Caracas

The Palacio Municipal de Caracas, or Consejo Municipal de Caracas, is the city hall of Caracas, Venezuela. It is located on the corner of Gradillas a Monjas opposite the Plaza Bolívar, occupying half of the plaza's southern section. The building dates from the seventeenth century but now bears the mark of Alejandro Chataing's Neoclassical additions in 1906. It was the focal point for the Constitutional Convention, and signing of the Declaration of Independence in the nineteenth century (declared on 5 July 1811 and hence known as the "cradle of independence"). The present building is the result of the work undertaken by the Venezuelan architect Alejandro Chataing in 1906. The west wing of the building, the Capilla de Santa Rosa de Lima (Santa Rosa chapel), the chapel where Venezuela's independence was declared in 1811, has been fully restored and furnished with authentic period pieces. The ground floor houses the Museo Caracas (Caracas Museum), which contains works by Venezuela's most celebrated painters and many other historic artifacts. It was declared a National Historic Landmark on 16 February 1979.

== History ==
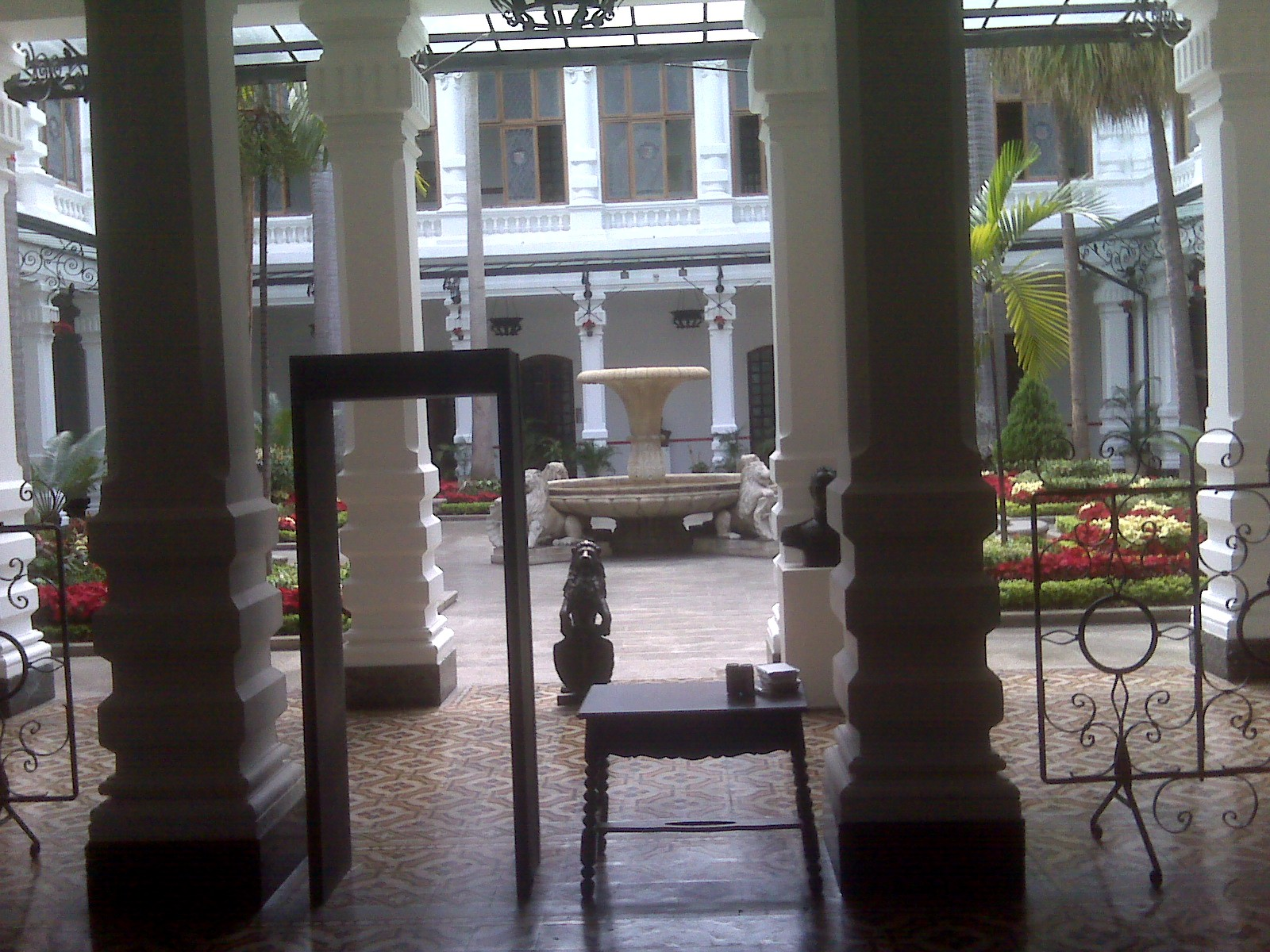
Palacio Municipal de Caracas, in the historic center of Caracas.

In 1673, Antonio Gonzáles de Acuña bought a number of buildings in the area around today's Plaza Mayor, adapting them to serve as a seminary. Known as the Colegio Seminario de Santa Rosa de Lima, it was the first seminary of the seventeenth century. It incorporated the features of the old chapel. Little by little, the seminary evolved as an institute of higher learning until in 1725 Juan José de Escalona y Calatayud, Bishop of Caracas, created the Real y Pontificia Universidad de Caracas which in 1810 became the Universidad de Los Andes, later renamed Universidad Central de Venezuela by Bolívar.

In 1872, the building was renovated by President Antonio Guzmán Blanco as the Palacio de Justicia (Supreme Court of Venezuela). The western pavilion was added in 1881. Further renovations and adaptations from 1904 to 1906 were undertaken on the initiative of President Cipriano Castro by the architect Alejandro Chataing (1873–1928). In 1979, the building was listed as a national monument. The edifice was the focal point for the Constitutional Convention, and signing of the Declaration of Independence in the nineteenth century (declared on 5 July 1811 and hence known as the "cradle of independence"), the installation of the de la Academia de Matemáticas, and operation of the Cabildo de Caracas.

On Christmas Eve 1809, Bolivar made plans to storm city hall with other Creoles but was stopped by a military officer. In the west wing of the building, the Capilla de Santa Rosa de Lima (Santa Rosa chapel), the chapel where Venezuela's independence was declared in 1811, has been fully restored and furnished with authentic period pieces. Subsequent to the regional elections of 2008, followers of Lina Ron, a Hugo Chávez supporter, took over city hall, graffitied the building's façade, and forced mayor Antonio Ledezma to another building, blocks away.

== Architecture ==
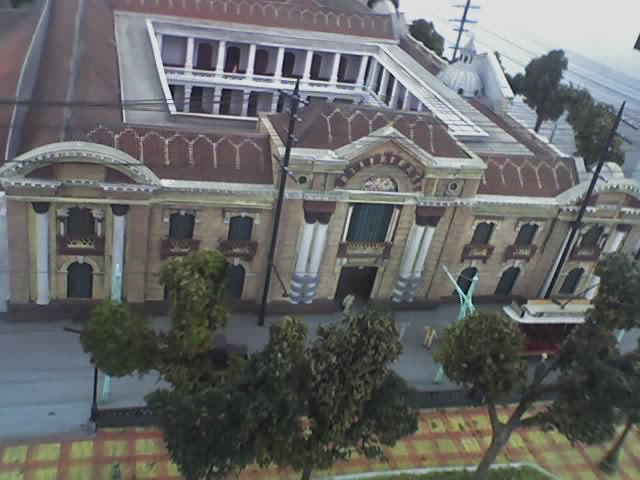
An aerial view of the Palacio Municipal de Caracas.

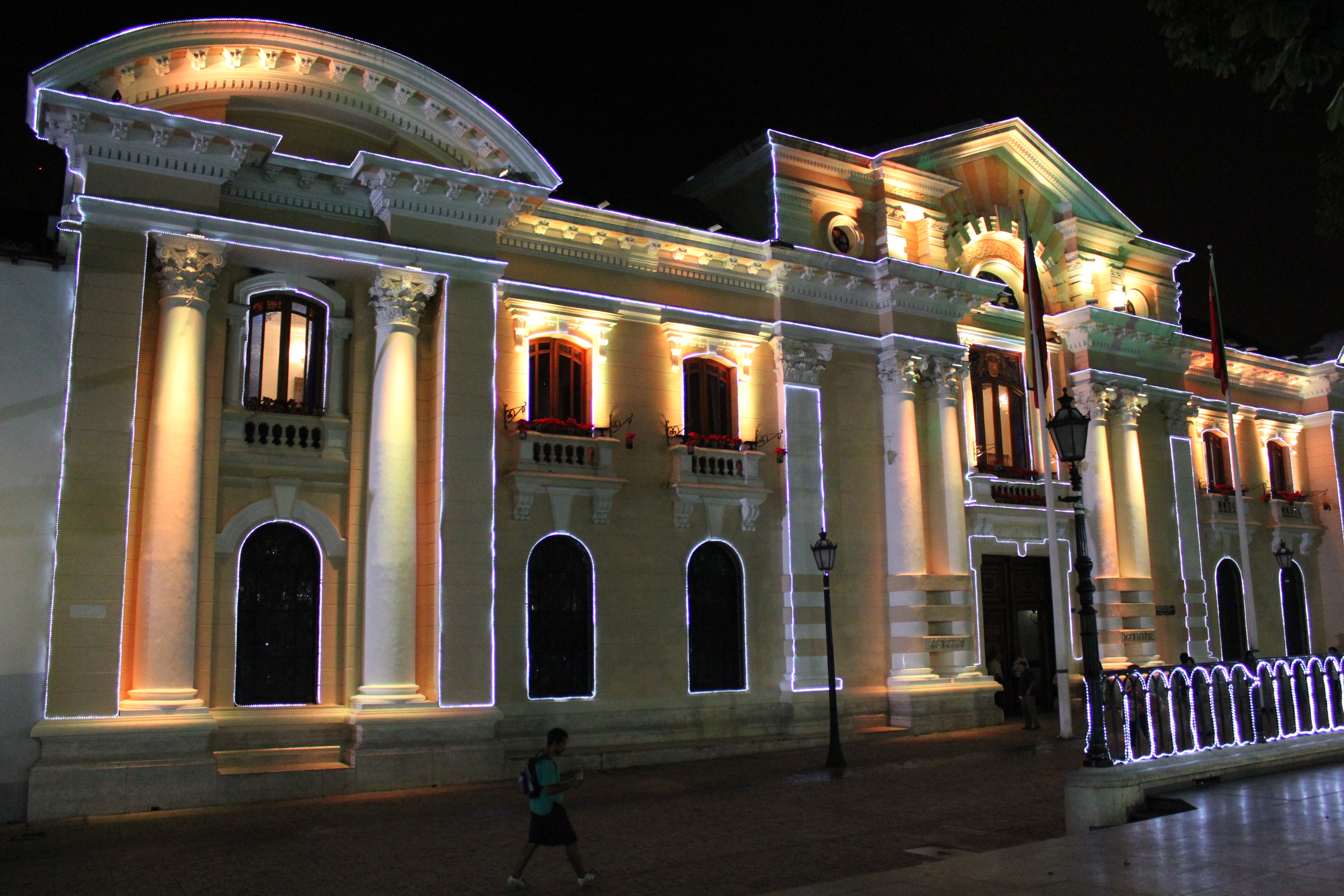
Exterior facade lit up at night.

Today's building is the result of the work undertaken by the Venezuelan architect Alejandro Chataing in 1906. It is located on the corner of Gradillas a Monjas opposite the Plaza Bolívar, and occupies half of the plaza's southern section. It is built in an eclectic Neoclassical style with three storeys along the main façade. The main entrance is flanked by double pillars in the composite order. It is crowned by a balcony decorated with composite pilasters and a triangular frontispiece. The east façade is also decorated with composite pillars designed to resemble those of the Roman Forum or similar works from antiquity. The large colonial building has an elegant patio in the interior and also houses the museum.

== Museum ==
The Museo Caracas (also Museo Santana, or Museo Crillo) is located on the ground floor, though one of the rooms is reached via a narrow wooden stairway. The ground floor contains works by Venezuela's most celebrated painters and many other historic artifacts. Four of the Palacio's rooms are used for exhibiting some 3,000 artifacts of artistic or historic interest. In Room 2, there are paintings of two of Venezuela's historic presidents: Joaquín Crespo (1841–1898) by Arturo Michelena and, just to the left, José Tadeo Monagas (1784–1868) by Martín Tovar y Tovar. Room 3 displays many of Santana's small carved figures representing Venezuelan celebrities from the early 20th century. Room 4 displays flags and banners including one from 1533 which belonged to the Spanish conquistador Francisco Pizarro. General Antonio José de Sucre presented it to Bolívar when he freed Venezuela from Spanish rule. Room 5 displays paintings by Venezuela's historic artists including Armando Reverón, Emilio Boggio, Rafael Monasterios, Federico Brandt and Manuel Cabré. Miniature paintings of the rural scenes drawn by Raul Santana are also on display. Bolivar is depicted in the heavens on a ceiling mural.

== Bibliography ==
- Arana, Marie (9 April 2013). Bolivar: American Liberator. Simon & Schuster. ISBN 978-1-4391-2495-6.
- Brushaber, Susan (1 October 1997). Venezuela Alive. Hunter Publishing, Inc. ISBN 978-1-55650-800-4.
- Carroll, Rory (7 March 2013). Comandante: Hugo Chavez's Venezuela. Penguin Group US. ISBN 978-1-101-60579-0.
- Dillon, Charles (6 October 2002). South America and Central America: A Tourist Guide. iUniverse. ISBN 978-1-4697-7306-3.
- Kohn, Beth (2007). Lonely Planet Venezuela. Lonely Planet. p. 62. ISBN 978-1-74104-545-1.
- Maddicks, Russell (1 February 2011). Venezuela: The Bradt Travel Guide. Bradt Travel Guides. ISBN 978-1-84162-299-6.
