= Luis Chataing =

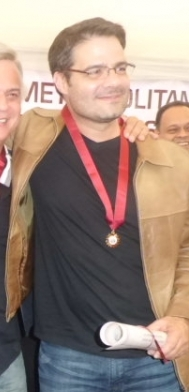
- Born: Luis Eduardo Chataing Zambrano; April 8, 1967 (age 59); Caracas, Venezuela
- Occupations: Actor, Speaker, Television presenter, Comedian
- Years active: 1998–present
- Website: soychataing.com

Luis Eduardo Chataing Zambrano (born April 8, 1967, in Caracas) is an announcer, actor, television presenter, and comedian. He is known for the show Stand Up Comedy.

== Personal life ==
His father was the architect Alejandro Chataing Roncajolo, a member of a large family of architects who have shaped Venezuelan architecture, and Gisela Zambrano Perdomo. Grandson of the architect Luis Eduardo Chataing (designer of the country's hospital network, Liceo Andres Bello, Military Hospital, Hospital Oncológico, School of Nursing and Customs of La Guaira), who was the son of another then-famous architect, Alejandro Chataing Poleo (Nuevo Circo in Caracas, Military History Museum, Arch of Carabobo, Academy of Fine Arts, Caracas Municipal Council).

== Filmography ==
Movie
Year	Title	Character	Director
2011	Er Conde Jones	TBA	Benjamín Rausseo

Radio
Year	Title	Station
2007–Feb 7, 2017	De Nuevo en la Mañana	LaMega 107.3fm

Television
Year	Title	Channel
1998	Nunca en Domingo	RCTV
1999	Ni Tan Tarde	Televen-PumaTV
2006	¿Sucede en Serio?	Sony Entertainment Television
2006	Así Lo Veo	Globovision
2007	Por Fin en Fin	TV Azteca
2007	Ya Es 1/2 Dia En China	Sony Entertainment Television
2012–2014 ( 10 / 06 /2014 )	Chataing	Televen
2015–2019	Conectados	TV Venezuela
