= Manuel Cabré =

Spanish-Venezuelan painter (1890–1984)

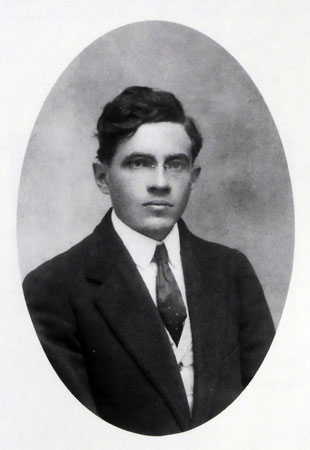
- Cabré c. 1912
- Born: January 25, 1890; Barcelona, Spain
- Died: February 26, 1984 (aged 94); Caracas, Venezuela
- Resting place: Southern General Cemetery, Caracas
- Education: Academia de Bellas Artes de Caracas; Académie de la Grande Chaumière; Académie Colarossi
- Known for: Landscape painting
- Notable work: Paisaje de la Sabana del Blanco (1908); Fragmento del Ávila (1914); El Ávila desde El Portachuelo (1928); Ruinas de trapiche de La Floresta (1951)
- Movement: Post-Impressionism
- Spouse: Esperanza Díaz (m. 1970)
- Parent(s): Ángel Cabré y Magriñá; Concepción Alsina y Clos
- Awards: Earl Stendahl Prize (1925); National Prize for Painting (1951); Order of Andrés Bello (1971); Order of the Liberator (1980)

Manuel Cabré Alsina (January 25, 1890 – February 26, 1984) was a Spanish-born Venezuelan painter, regarded by art historians and critics as one of the foremost exponents of 20th-century Venezuelan landscape painting and a central figure in the country's transition to modern art. Although widely known by the popular epithet "the painter of El Ávila" due to his recurring depictions of the Cerro El Ávila mountain range overlooking the capital, the artist preferred to define himself as "the painter of the Valley of Caracas."

The son of Spanish sculptor Ángel Cabré y Magriñá, he settled in Caracas at the age of six. After studying at the Academy of Fine Arts of Caracas under Antonio Herrera Toro, he co-founded the Círculo de Bellas Artes in 1912, an artistic association that renewed Venezuelan visual arts by breaking with academic historicism, promoting en plein air painting, and laying the foundations for private art collecting in the country. Between 1920 and 1931 he lived in France, exhibiting regularly at the Salon des Indépendants and the Salon d'Automne in Paris and assimilating the constructive principles of Paul Cézanne and Post-Cubism. Upon his permanent return to Venezuela, he played a key role in the 1936 educational reform of the Caracas School of Plastic Arts, served as director of the Museum of Fine Arts of Caracas (1942–1946), and received the National Prize for Painting (1951).

== Biography ==
=== Early years and academic training (1890–1911) ===
Cabré was born in Barcelona, Spain, on January 25, 1890, to academic sculptor and teacher Ángel Cabré y Magriñá (1863–1940) and Concepción Alsina y Clos (1864–1943). In May 1896, when Manuel was six years old, the family moved to Caracas at the invitation of Venezuelan President Joaquín Crespo, who had promised his father public ornamentation commissions in the capital. Crespo's death in battle in April 1898 and subsequent political instability frustrated those government projects, leaving Ángel Cabré with only a modestly paid professorship of sculpture at the Academy of Fine Arts of Caracas. Due to the family's financial hardship, young Manuel left formal schooling early, working first delivering breakfasts at the San Jacinto market and later pasting tax stamps onto cigarette packs at the "Fama de Cuba" tobacco factory.

In 1904, at age fourteen, he formally enrolled in drawing and coloring classes at the Academy of Fine Arts of Caracas, studying under Emilio Mauri and Antonio Herrera Toro, and befriending fellow students Antonio Edmundo Monsanto, Armando Reverón, Federico Brandt, and Rafael Monasterios. In 1908 he won his first prize at the Academy's annual competition with the large-scale canvas Paisaje de la Sabana del Blanco. Following Mauri's death, Cabré joined the January 1909 student strike demanding curriculum reforms and the dismissal of the new director, Herrera Toro; when their demands were rejected, the strikers permanently left the Academy (in later years, Cabré publicly regretted the protest as "unfair" to Herrera Toro). To support himself without making commercial concessions or painting commissioned portraits, from 1909 to 1920 he worked mornings polychroming imported plaster statuettes at Eusebio Chellini's marble workshop, dedicating his afternoons to painting outdoors.

=== Círculo de Bellas Artes (1912–1920) ===
In August 1912, on the initiative of journalist and caricaturist Leoncio Martínez, Antonio Edmundo Monsanto, and Cabré, the Círculo de Bellas Artes was founded at the old Calcaño Theater in Caracas, bringing together young painters (including Reverón, Brandt, Monasterios, and Próspero Martínez) and writers (such as Rómulo Gallegos, Fernando Paz Castillo, and Enrique Planchart). The group sought to dignify the profession of painting in Caracas society and assign monetary value to artworks. At the Circle's second annual salon in 1914, Cabré's Fragmento del Ávila became the first modern painting sold to a private buyer in Venezuela (acquired by photographer Domingo Lucca), an event cited by art historians as the starting point of private modern art collecting in the country.

Between 1913 and 1920, Cabré painted extensively en plein air around El Paraíso, the Guaire River, and Gamboa, developing his "Blue Period" (Spanish: Época azul), characterized by short, divided Impressionist brushstrokes and blue, silver-gray, and violet atmospheric tones. In May 1919 he formed a decisive friendship with Franco-Venezuelan Impressionist Emilio Boggio during the latter's visit to Caracas; Boggio painted alongside him, advised him to "free himself from nature," and encouraged him to travel to Paris. In August 1920, Cabré held his first solo exhibition of 119 works at the School of Music and Declamation, selling out the available paintings to finance his voyage to France.

=== Parisian period (1920–1931) ===
Learning by telegraph of Boggio's sudden death just days before disembarking at Le Havre in June 1920, Cabré settled in Paris, where he lived for eleven years. He resided in Montparnasse (from 1925 at 10 Villa Duthy) with his partner, the French artist Germaine, supporting himself without government scholarships through savings, family remittances, sales in Montparnasse cafés, and commissions from Venezuelan collectors such as John Boulton. He attended the Académie de la Grande Chaumière and Académie Colarossi as an independent student and studied the masters at the Louvre. Rejecting orthodox adherence to Cubism or Surrealism, he restructured his visual language under the constructive influence of Paul Cézanne and the geometric synthesis of Post-Cubism (André Lhote, André Derain, Maurice de Vlaminck). Working in Charenton, Savoie, and the ports of Provence (Cassis, Saint-Tropez, Martigues, and Toulon), he replaced fragmented brushwork with solid, architectonic modeling, while also painting large panoramic views of Caracas from memory and photographs sent by Domingo Lucca.

During the 1920s, Cabré achieved international recognition: he exhibited regularly at the Paris Salon d'Automne (1922, 1926, 1927, 1928) and Salon des Indépendants (1922, 1923, 1925, 1926, 1928, 1929), as well as at the Latin American Exhibition at the Palais Galliera (1924). In 1925 he participated in the Pan-American Exhibition of Oil Paintings at the Los Angeles Museum, winning the Earl Stendahl Prize (shared with Mexican painter Alfonso Villareal) for his oil Fishing Boats-France. In October 1927 he held a solo exhibition of Provençal landscapes at the Galerie Charles-Auguste Girard in Paris, earning praise from French critic Pierre Humbourg in La Patrie and La Presse and in the weekly La Semaine à Paris. After brief trips to Caracas in 1930 and 1931 to exhibit at the Club Central, the sudden illness and death of his partner Germaine in Paris prompted his permanent return to Venezuela at the end of 1931.

=== Return to Venezuela, museum directorship, and later years (1931–1984) ===
After a period of optical readjustment to the intense tropical light (1931–1937), Cabré became involved in the cultural modernization that followed the death of dictator Juan Vicente Gómez. In 1936, when Minister of Education Rómulo Gallegos offered him the directorship of the Academy of Fine Arts, Cabré declined in favor of his friend Antonio Edmundo Monsanto, accepting instead the post of Inspector of Fine Arts. Alongside Monsanto and Chilean educator Armando Lira, he supervised the curriculum reform that transformed the old Academy into the School of Plastic and Applied Arts of Caracas. By 1938–1940 he reached his mature monumental and panoramic style, exhibiting at the Riverside Museum in New York (1940) and holding his first retrospective of 40 works at the Museum of Fine Arts of Caracas (1941).

From 1942 to 1946, Cabré served as director of the Museum of Fine Arts of Caracas (MBA), where he organized the landmark curatorial retrospective El paisaje venezolano (1942, featuring 347 works by 70 artists) and dedicated a hall of the Annual Official Salon to young avant-garde painters such as Alejandro Otero, Mateo Manaure, and Héctor Poleo. At the request of President Isaías Medina Angarita, he undertook two painting journeys through the Venezuelan Andes (Mérida and Táchira) in 1942 and 1943.

In 1951 he received the National Prize for Painting at the XII Official Salon for Ruinas de trapiche de La Floresta. Maintaining his political independence, in early 1958 he refused an offer from dictator Marcos Pérez Jiménez to become a senator in the National Congress. As rapid urbanization altered Caracas, Cabré moved his easel eastward to the green expanses of the Caracas Country Club and La Urbina, and from 1965 onward painted in his La Campiña studio. In 1970, at age eighty, he married his longtime partner Esperanza Díaz, mother of his daughter Belén María. Major retrospectives of his work were held at the Eugenio Mendoza Foundation (1965), the Museum of Fine Arts (1971, where President Rafael Caldera awarded him the Order of Andrés Bello), and the National Art Gallery and Contemporary Art Museum of Caracas (1980, where President Luis Herrera Campins conferred upon him the Order of the Liberator). Cabré died in Caracas on February 26, 1984, at the age of 94, and received state honors at the National Art Gallery.

== Artistic style and technique ==
Art critics including Juan Calzadilla, Alfredo Boulton, and Miguel Otero Silva emphasize that Cabré's landscapes are not photographic or purely descriptive reproductions of nature, but autonomous intellectual and poetic constructions governed by Cézannian spatial order. Calzadilla's 1980 monograph divides Cabré's oeuvre into six stylistic stages: (1) the Academic and Portrait Period (1906–1912); (2) the Blue Period during the Círculo de Bellas Artes (1913–1920); (3) the French Synthetic Period (1920–1931); (4) the Transition and Return to the Tropics (1931–1937); (5) the Panoramic Plenitude and Andean Landscapes (1938–1945); and (6) El Ávila as Central Theme and Internal Volumetric Structuring (1945–1984).

Technically, Cabré worked with strict daily discipline. He rejected the academic practice of toning the canvas with a dark ground—arguing that dark underlayers eventually dull overlying lighter pigments—and instead reserved the pure white of the canvas beneath every illuminated area after fixing the structural drawing with charcoal and neutral sepia. He used stable mineral pigments (ultramarine, cerulean, and cobalt blue; cadmium yellow and red; Venetian red; viridian; sienna; ochre; and lead white), avoiding black. Refusing to include modern skyscrapers in his canvases, from the 1960s onward he evoked the pre-urbanized valley of Caracas by combining his visual memory with a custom-built 3D optical device: a dual-lens stereoscope mounted on a hand-sawn wooden stand and a Havana cigar box, through which he viewed color transparencies he had taken in earlier decades.

== Awards and collections ==
- 1908: First Prize, Annual Exhibition of the Academy of Fine Arts of Caracas (for Paisaje de la Sabana del Blanco).
- 1925: Earl Stendahl Prize, Pan-American Exhibition of Oil Paintings, Los Angeles Museum (for Fishing Boats-France).
- 1944: Arístides Rojas Prize, V Official Salon of Venezuelan Art (for Mañana de diciembre).
- 1947: John Boulton Prize, VIII Official Salon of Venezuelan Art (for Paisaje del Country Club).
- 1949: Antonio Edmundo Monsanto Prize, VII Arturo Michelena Salon (Valencia), and Planchart Salon Prize.
- 1951: National Prize for Painting, XII Official Salon of Venezuelan Art (for Ruinas de trapiche de La Floresta).
- 1955: Antonio Herrera Toro Prize, XVI Official Salon of Venezuelan Art.
- 1956: Rotary Club Prize, XVII Official Salon of Venezuelan Art.
- 1957: Popular Prize, IX Planchart Salon (for Vista de Capacho Viejo).
- 1967: Order of the City of Caracas.
- 1971: Order of Andrés Bello, First Class.
- 1980: Order of the Liberator, Officer Class.

Cabré's works are held in major public and private collections, including the National Art Gallery (GAN), the Museum of Fine Arts of Caracas (MBA), the Contemporary Art Museum of Caracas (MACC), the Caracas Museum (Municipal Palace), the Presidential Residence La Casona, the Central Bank of Venezuela, the Cisneros Collection, and the Polar Foundation. In 2006, his heirs established the Fundación Cabré to preserve and catalog his legacy.
