= Ayacucho Theatre =

Teatro Ayacucho
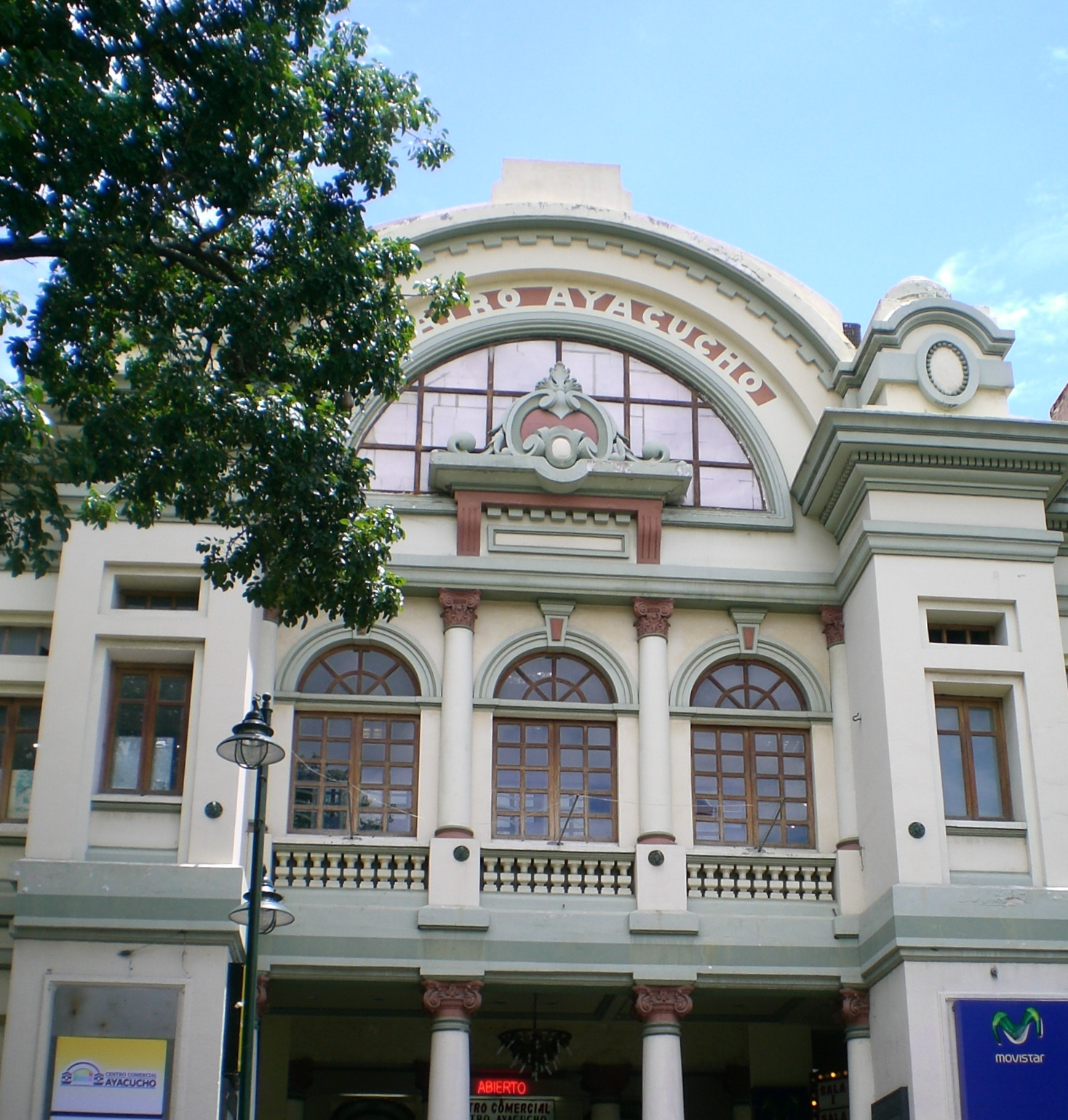
- View of the theatre
- Interactive map of the Teatro Ayacucho area

General information
- Location: Municipio Libertador de Caracas, Venezuela
- Coordinates: 10.50558°N 66.91675°W
- Opening: 19 December 1925

Design and construction
- Architect: Alejandro Chataing

The Ayacucho Theatre or Teatro Ayacucho is a cinema located in central Caracas, specifically in the Libertador Municipality parish in the west of the Caracas metropolitan district.

Established on 19 December 1925, it is the second oldest cinema in Caracas and Venezuela after the Teatro Rialto (inaugurated in 1917).

Its design is the work of Venezuelan architect Alejandro Chataing. The space also currently houses a small commercial center, but its main function is still to show films. It was declared a national historical monument in 1994.
