= Emilio Boggio =

Italian-Venezuelan impressionist painter

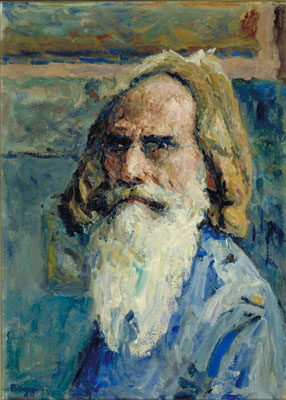
- Self-portrait
- Born: Emilio Boggio; May 21, 1857; Caracas (Distrito Federal, Venezuela)
- Died: July 6, 1920 (aged 63); Auvers-sur-Oise, France
- Education: Académie Julian, Paris
- Alma mater: Lycée Michelet;
- Known for: Painting
- Notable work: Bridge over the River Oise, Landscape (oil on wood), various seascapes (1907–1909)
- Style: Impressionism, Post-Impressionism
- Movement: French Impressionism, Venezuelan modern art
- Awards: Hors Concours, Salon des Artistes Français (1888), Bronze Medal, Exposition Universelle (Paris) (1889)

Emilio Boggio (21 May 1857 – 7 June 1920) was an Italian-Venezuelan pioneering impressionist painter. In 1864 he traveled to France and studied at the Lycée Michelet in Paris until 1870. In 1873, he returned to Caracas and dedicated himself to the family business. In 1877, he returned to France to join the Académie Julian where he received lessons from Jean-Paul Laurens. In 1888, obtained a Hors Concours (Honorable Mention) at the Salon of the Société des Artistes Français (Salon of French Artists) and in 1889, was awarded a bronze medal at the Exposition Universelle in Paris.

Between 1907 and 1909, he resided in Italy, where he made a series of seascapes. In 1919, he traveled to Caracas for a few months and exhibited at the Central University of Venezuela. Boggio died in France the following year.

Some of Boggio's original paintings which are "brilliantly colorful, bright, beautiful, with personal style imprint" are in the National Art Gallery of Caracas and in the Palacio Municipal de Caracas.

== Early life ==
Boggio was born on 21 May 1857 in Caracas, Venezuela to parents who were in trading business and were prosperous. His father was an Italian trader while his mother was Venezuelan of French and Spanish descent, direct descendant of the Spanish conqueror Gabriel de Ávila. At age 15, he was sent to France to finish his studies of commerce. After returning to Caracas, he became an assistant in a fabric trading business. He worked for four years but could not achieve anything as he was not inclined to pursue that profession as he was more of a painter. He then went back to France at the age of 20 for health reasons as he had contacted typhoid. He was therefore brought back to France to be treated and then pursue his studies on the subject of business economics and did 2 years educational training in commerce. His parents were still hoping that he would join the family business in trading.

However, in 1878, when he attended the Exposition Universelle in Paris, he decided that he would pursue the art of painting as his vocation. He then enrolled in the Julian Academy, a school of painting where he was trained by Jean-Paul Laurens who was a well known French painter, illustrator, and teacher. His field of special interest was Impressionism, an art movement that had its origin in France in the nineteenth century. Seven years later, met Arturo Michelena, from Venezuela. In 1888, obtained a Hors Concours (Honorable Mention) at the Salón de Artistas Franceses (Salon of French Artists) and in 1889, was awarded a bronze medal at the Exposition Universelle in Paris.

== Career ==
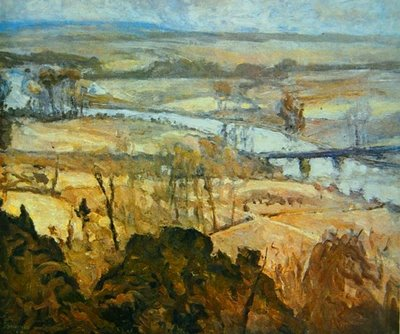
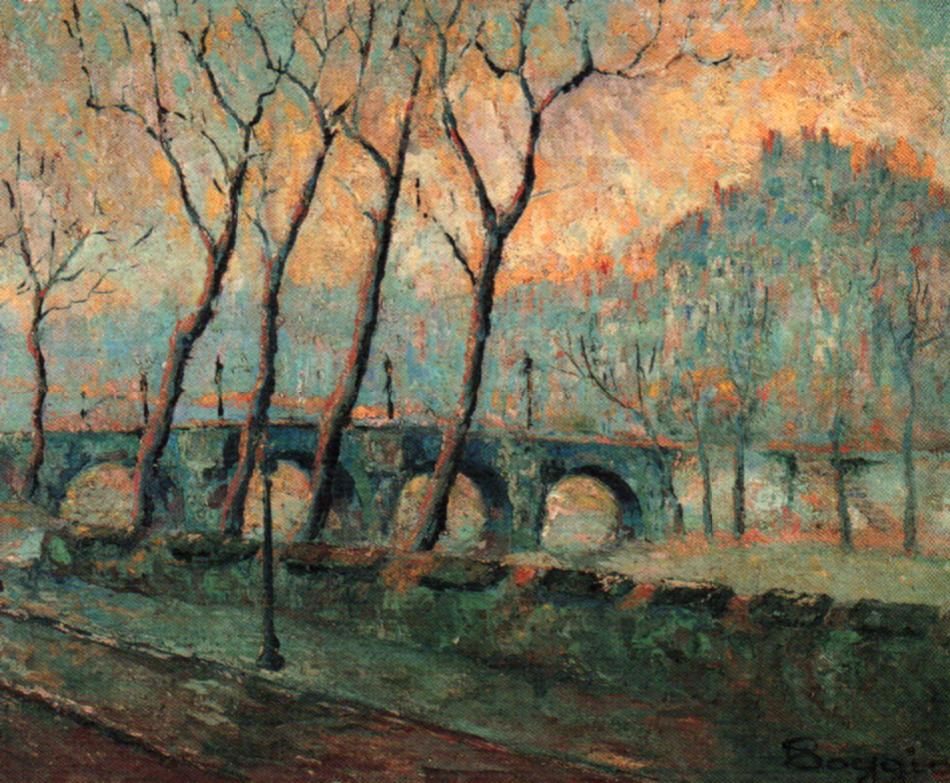
Left: Painting titled “Bridge over the River Oise's; right: Landscape painting (oil on wood) of a bridge.

After his training he pursued his vocation as an artist in Impressionist paintings and became famous as a Venezuelan-French impressionist. He interacted with impressionist painters like Camille Pissarro. From 1900 he started working on these concepts. He actively worked in Italy for two years between 1907 and 1909. Established in 1912, the Círculo de Bellas Artes de Caracas supported the work of Boggio and opposed the prevalent academic styles.

In 1918 or 1919, Boggio, in his sixties, returned to Venezuela to hold an exhibition of his paintings in Caracas. His stay provided an excellent opportunity to the young artists of Caracas such as Reveron, Cabre, Brandt, Castillo and others to learn about impressionist paintings. He guided them and helped them to free themselves from the traditional academic painting and imbibe knowledge of the European Impressionist trends in painting. He not only encouraged them but also explained the techniques of his paintings and accompanied them during their field trips to paint. He stayed in Caracas for less than a year and during this time exhibited sixty of his paintings at the Escuela de Musica.

== Death and legacy ==
He returned to France in 1920 and soon thereafter died on 6 July 1920 at Auvers-sur-Oise in France. His friends included Camille Pissarro and of Henri-Jean Guillaume Martin. Boggio was influenced by Vincent van Gogh, and in turn, Boggio influenced Armando Reverón.

== Partial works ==
He is credited with five publications in two languages. Some of Boggio's original paintings which are "brilliantly colorful, bright, beautiful, with personal style imprint" are in the National Art Gallery of Caracas and in the Palacio Municipal de Caracas.
