= Art of Francisco Narváez in the University City of Caracas =

Art in Venezuela

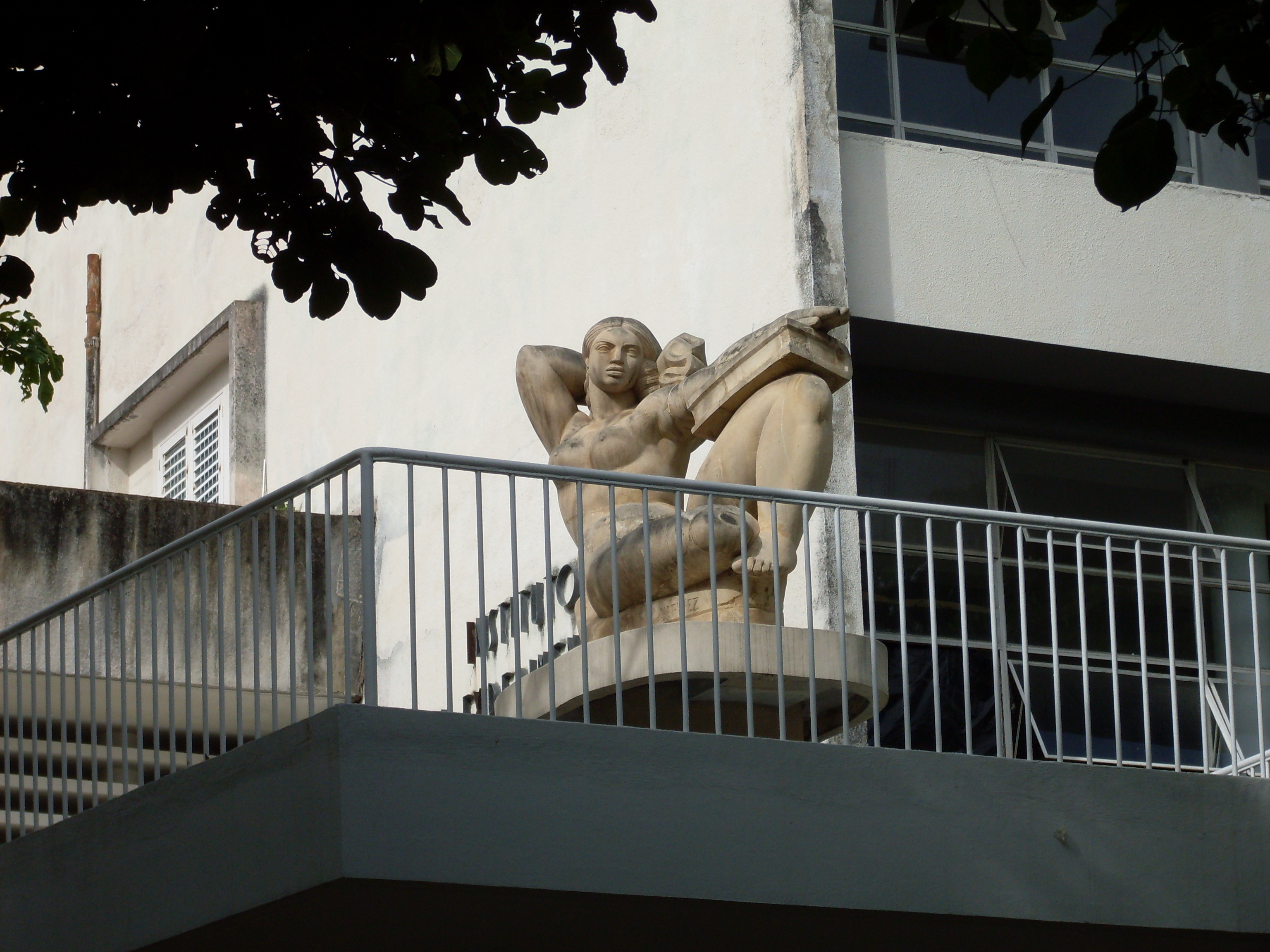
La educación, 1950, Institute of Experimental Medicine, University City of Caracas

Francisco Narváez was commissioned to create pieces for the University City of Caracas campus in 1949, initially working between 1950 and 1953, with other pieces (to a total of twelve) added later. (Note: Twelve works by Narváez are known to be permanent features of the campus; one of these, Torso, is not on public display. Narváez created eleven original pieces for the campus, with Torso being a later acquisition.) The artworks include stone and metal statues, busts, reliefs, and various material of murals. Three of the statues are made of Cumarebo stone: El Atleta, a large statue in the sports complex, and La educación and La ciencia in the medical complex. The Cumarebo stone is a favourite material of Narváez. Two sculptures of the esteemed doctor José Gregorio Hernández and President José María Vargas grace the campus grounds.

Three of the murals are also in the medical complex, and were the first artworks to be installed on the campus; their imagery combines science and religion. Eleven of the works are considered part of the campus living museum; the other, a wooden bust called Torso, was created in 1956 and is currently displayed in the dean of the Faculty of Architecture and Urban Planning (FAU)'s office. Narváez works in various materials, with an artistic style based in his own Venezuelan identity as well as influenced by European modes and classical sculptures from antiquity, from his background in Paris. The artist had worked with campus architect Carlos Raúl Villanueva on several occasions before, creating public art that reflected contemporary social issues. The collaborations of the two show developments in modernist art in the country.

As part of a World Heritage Site, several conservation efforts have taken place, with a group dedicated to preserving Narváez' campus artwork; the latest plans for restoration, in 1999 and 2000, were not undertaken due to a lack of funds.

== Background ==
Francisco Narváez had chosen to study at the Académie Julian in Paris in the 1920s and '30s, rather than continuing to study in Caracas or attend the École nationale supérieure des Beaux-Arts, because of his aversion to following trends: his style was largely connected to his national identity, but he did not follow the predominant Latin American schools of the time. He also did not work in line with European artistic movements, but he "knew how to assimilate the contributions that artists such as Pablo Picasso or Constantin Brâncuși, for example, were achieving in the field of sculpture" to his own work. At Julian, he was also exposed to the ideology of appreciating past sculptural movements while moving towards modernism, and got to explore the Greek and Egyptian sculptures at the Louvre while attending. He said: "the Académie Julian hastened my steps towards modern art, but also it taught me the importance of stopping, in a critical spirit, to consider the significance that classical art had in its time, precisely a new vision that I would not have developed in Caracas".

He first worked with the architect Carlos Raúl Villanueva in 1935, with Villanueva hiring Narváez to create pieces for several museums he was designing. In 1943, Narváez was called on again, this time to create large sculptural pieces for the main square of El Silencio, the urban area Villanueva was reinvigorating. The construction of the Central University of Venezuela (UCV)'s University City of Caracas campus, designed by Villanueva, began in the late 1940s, with the first artworks being installed in 1950. Narváez had been commissioned to produce works for the campus in 1949, and the first works on the campus were those designed by Narváez for the medical complex. He created many works of art for the campus, in various media. In 1952 Narváez spent much time in Italy and suffered a heart attack; he returned to Venezuela in 1953 and continued to work on the campus.

== Style ==
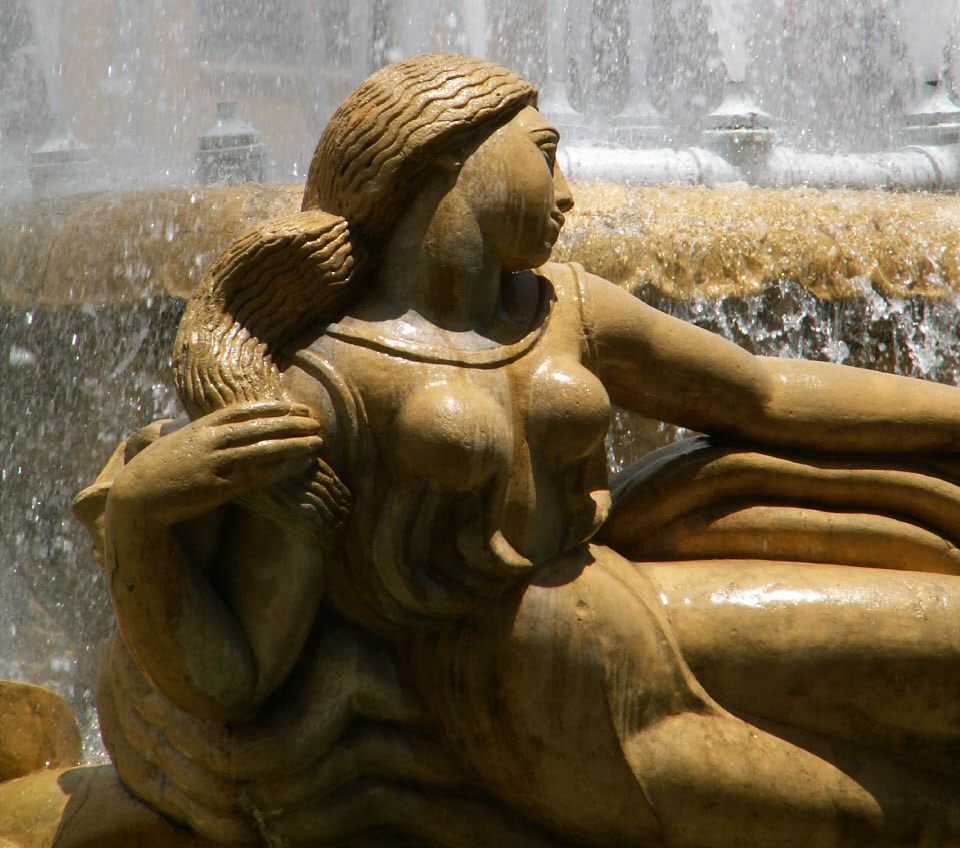
Detail of Las Toninas, 1945, El Silencio's Plaza O'Leary. Made by Francisco Narváez for Carlos Raúl Villanueva.

Narváez' art often depicts human nudes, being a prevalent theme in his paintings and present in his various sculptures. He was first taught principles of sculpture in Caracas – though the art school there was progressive in its painting classes, it was antiquated in terms of sculpting – which focused on female nudes, and later gained an appreciation for the artistry of the human form in ancient sculptures he saw in Europe. His human forms, unlike those he had seen, often represented ethnic peoples of Venezuela, including criollos, mestizos, native people, and black Americans, while maintaining Mediterranean elements.

His monumental works produced for Villanueva's public spaces are said to embody "the majestic spirit and poses of classical art, but proudly displaying the features and fibrous bodies of a mixed race", a theme also prevalent in social processes during the aftermath of Juan Vicente Gómez' dictatorship being toppled in 1935. His works are identified as part of the advent of modernity in Venezuela, and in the style of the "first phase" of the University City. His art of the period straddles the native identity of early modernism and the abstract art of more mature modernism in the country; his artistic style developed during the creation of the campus artworks. While continuing to depict the human form, it became more abstract (with works like La Cultura) compared to his earlier adherence to anatomical accuracy.

The institutes of Experimental Medicine and Anatomy form part of the medical complex, and are in the style of Villanueva's initial plan for the campus to be perfectly symmetrical (a design later abandoned). The buildings are connected by a tunnel and are designed around an axis of symmetry lying between the two, with "similar masses" reflected on each side. Two each of Narváez' murals and sculptures are part of this design.

== Cumarebo stone sculptures ==
The use of wood and stone native to Venezuela was a practice that Narváez pioneered. He was the first to use native stone, like from Cumarebo, for large scale projects. Cumarebo stone is a favorite material of Narváez as he believed that the marine fossils within it would enrich his work, and one influence on many of his Cumarebo sculptures is the dynamism of water.

=== La educación and La ciencia ===
Year: 1950–51

Within the medical complex are two of Narváez' Cumarebo stone statues that are detailed depictions of female nudity.

La educación depicts a woman sitting sideways and balancing a book on a raised knee. It is located outside on the first floor terrace of the Institute of Experimental Medicine. La ciencia shows a woman sitting sideways. A boy is kneeling in her lap, in the position of Jesus on the cross. This sculpture is on the first floor terrace of the José Izquierdo Institute of Anatomy.

In 1986, the university commission to preserve the campus artworks resigned due to being left out of conversations with the university. However, the original conservation group formed to preserve Narváez' works continued to run. In 1987, the group and university together selected La ciencia as the first work to be restored, as it was most in need. They hired specialists, working with the Instituto Central de Restauración de Roma (Central Restoration Institute of Rome). The group received funds from PDVSA and brought in Giusseppina Fazio to clean away algae and lichen and to reinforce the stucco connecting different parts of the sculpture.

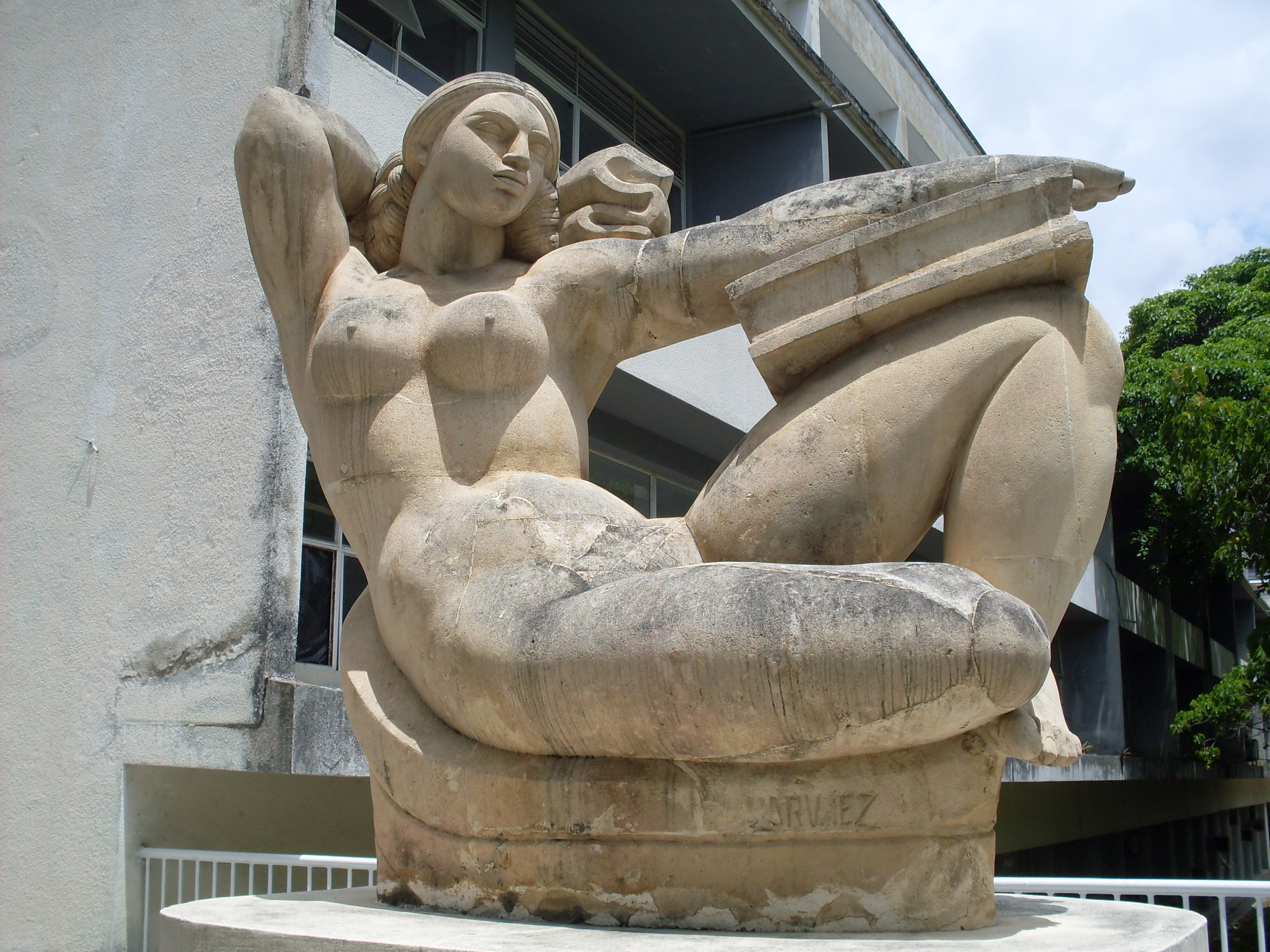
La educación, 1950, Institute of Experimental Medicine

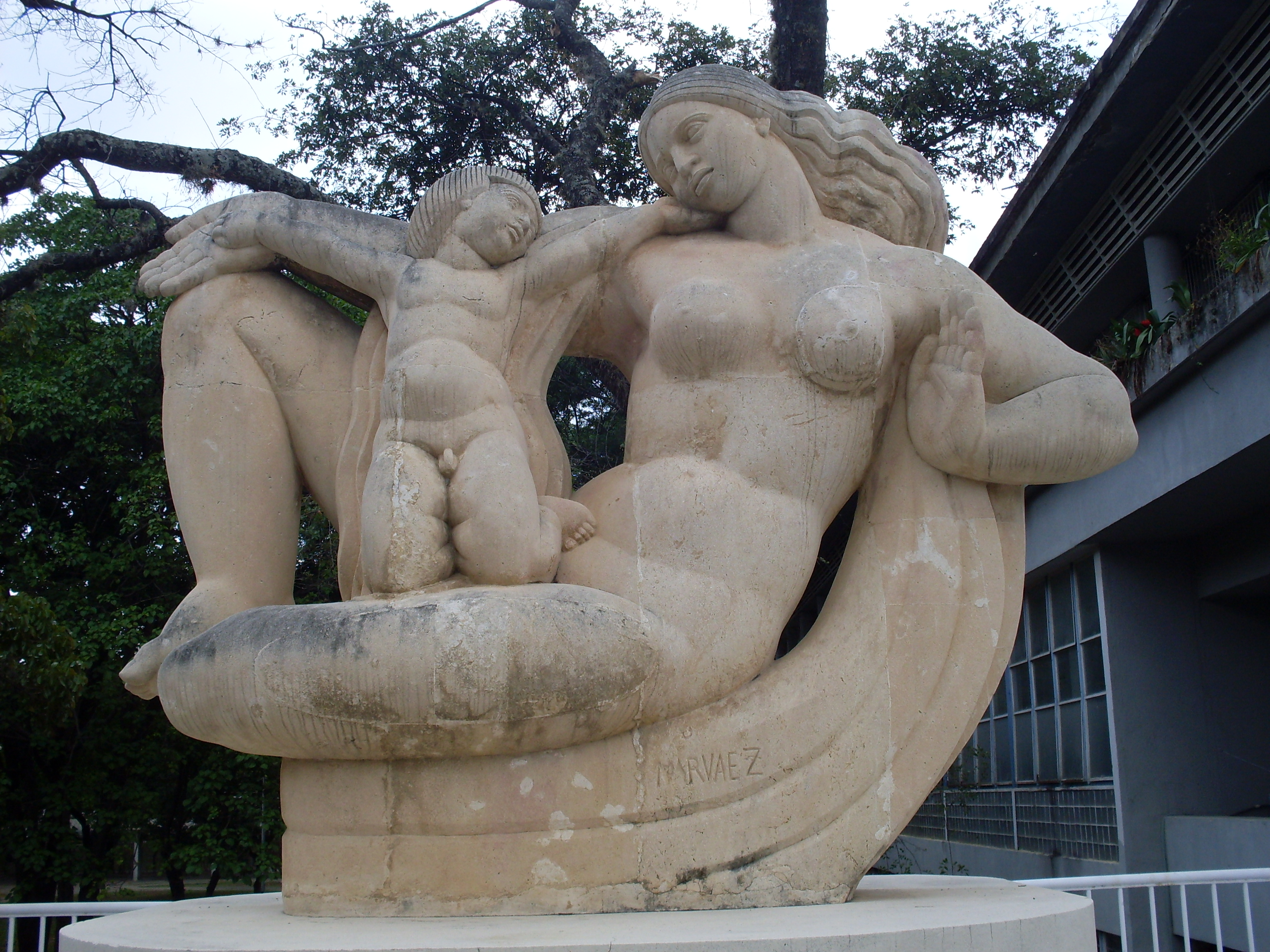
La ciencia, 1951, José Izqierdo Institute of Anatomy

=== El Atleta ===
Year: 1951

El Atleta is a very large statue, located just to the southwest of the Olympic Stadium, near the south end of the grandstand. The statue is said to represent an artistic turning point for Narváez, when he became more experimental in his design principles, as well as being the culmination of his criollista period. Narváez described the statue as "like a column of the Parthenon".

The design of the athlete figure references both the "majesty of the Egyptian pharaohs" and the careful eye to human anatomy of the Greek sculptors. However, it is a more geometric rendering, in line with the new wave of abstractionism. A curator of Narváez' works, Susana Benko, says that the piece "maintain[s] the simplicity of the lines that had Narváez fascinated with the Egyptians". Benko also suggests that the colossal scale and towering totem-like feel of the statue were Ancient Egyptian influences.

In 1987, it was restored by Fazio along with La ciencia as part of the Cumarebo stone conservation works. Since then, the condition of the statue has been degrading; the Venezuelan government have made no efforts to preserve it, despite being part of a World Heritage Site. The surface is both blackened from pollution, and permanently damaged, with some parts rubbed or chipped away.

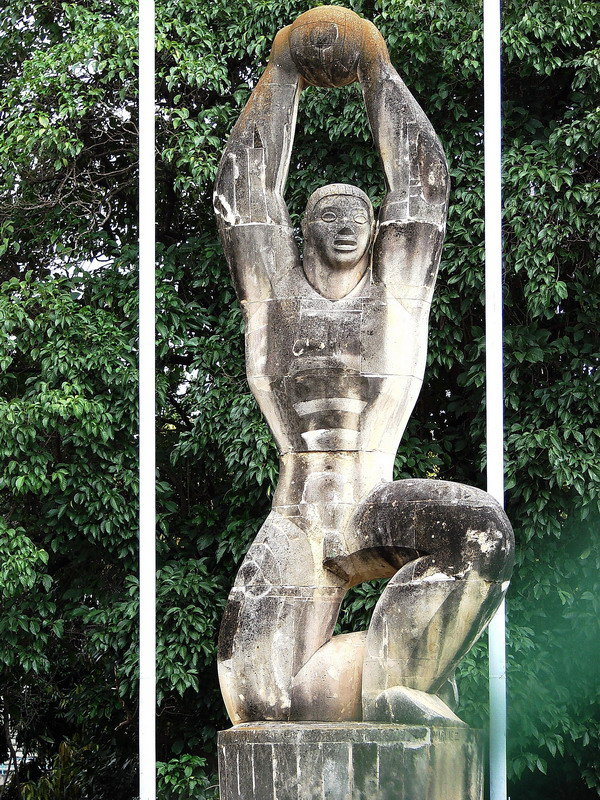
El Atleta, 1951, near Olympic Stadium. Photograph taken in 2006.

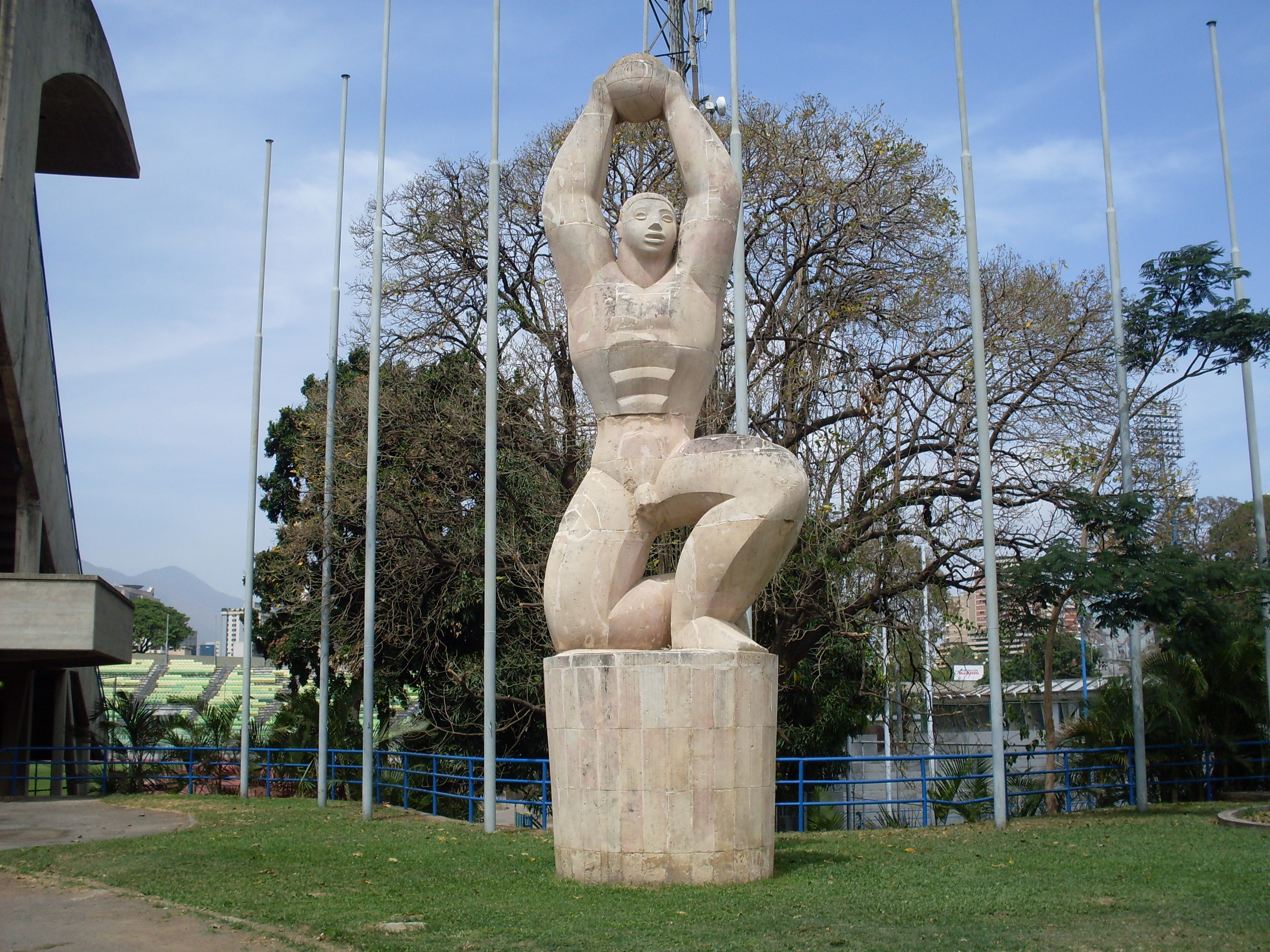
El Atleta, 1951, near Olympic Stadium. Photograph taken in 2015.

== Medical complex murals ==
The mosaic murals at the entrances of the Institute of Experimental Medicine and the Institute of Anatomy were made by Narváez and installed by ceramist María Luisa Tovar.

=== Untitled mural at the Institute of Experimental Medicine ===
Year: 1950

This mural is mosaic showing both surgical and religious imagery, including Adam and Eve and the Holy Grail. It can be found on the right-side wall at the entrance to the Institute of Experimental Medicine.

=== Untitled mural at the José Izquierdo Institute of Anatomy ===
Year: 1950–51

Another mosaic, this mural shows a variety of anatomical images, including a Vitruvian woman. It can be found on the left-side wall at the entrance to the José Izquierdo Institute of Anatomy. Completed in 1951, the design is in direct reference to the building it inhabits, with two "eye-catching" figures: the bare-chested woman with arms extended, and the skinless man reclining across the piece from right to left. However, there are many more figures in the image, too. All-male physicians in gowns and caps variously examine the two main figures, read books, and work with microscopes. In the bottom right, a book and microscope are illuminated. The mural and its ceramics are preserved quite well.

=== Cristo ===
Year: 1950

Cristo is a painted fresco depicting Jesus on the cross, surrounded by female figures, on the wall behind the altar in the Chapel of the University Hospital. The mural was restored in the 1990s, with art restorer Fernando de Tovar Pantin. Dirt was removed and scratches repaired, various unwanted paint splashes were removed, and the color was restored.

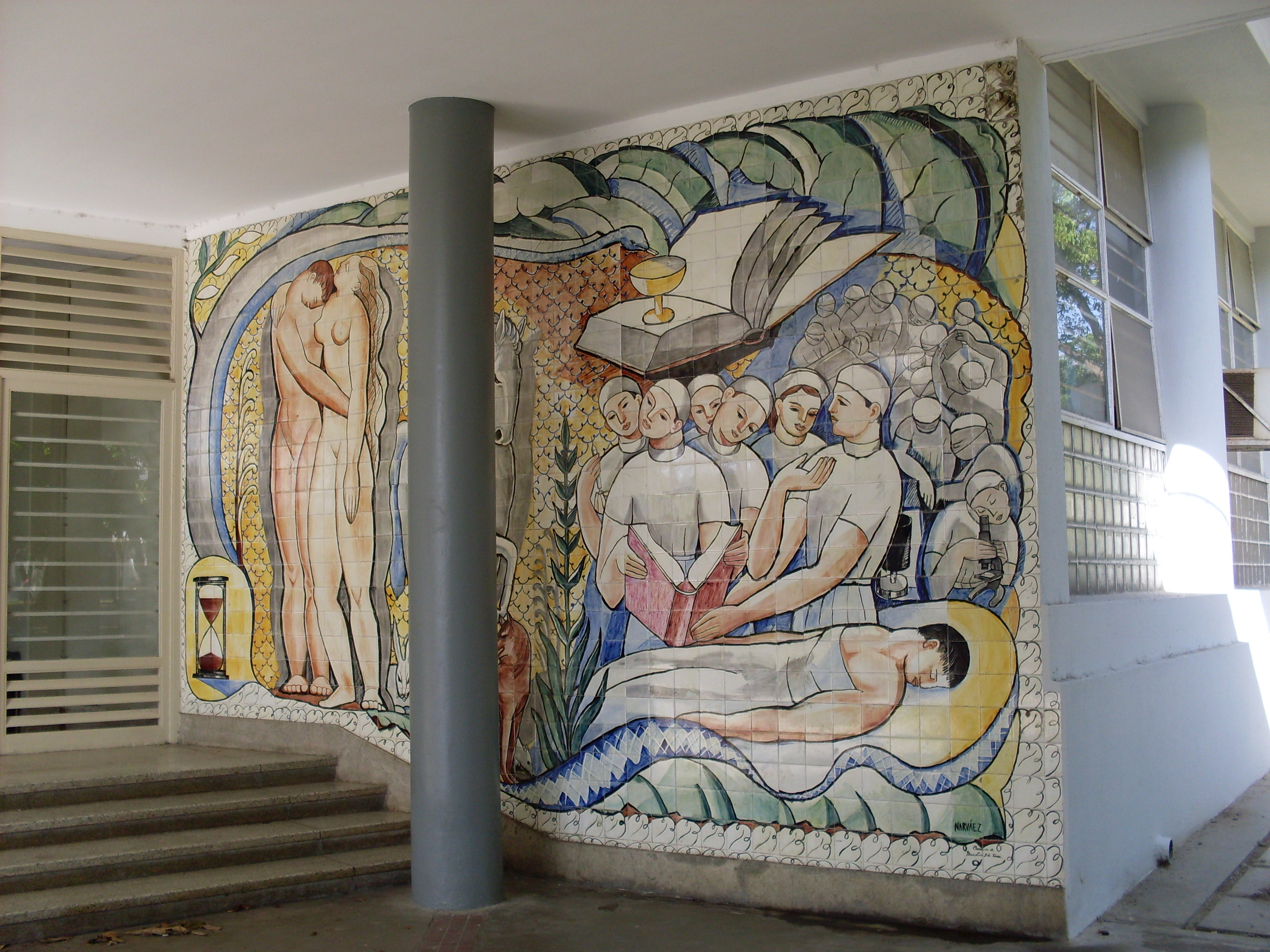
Untitled mural, 1950, Institute of Experimental Medicine

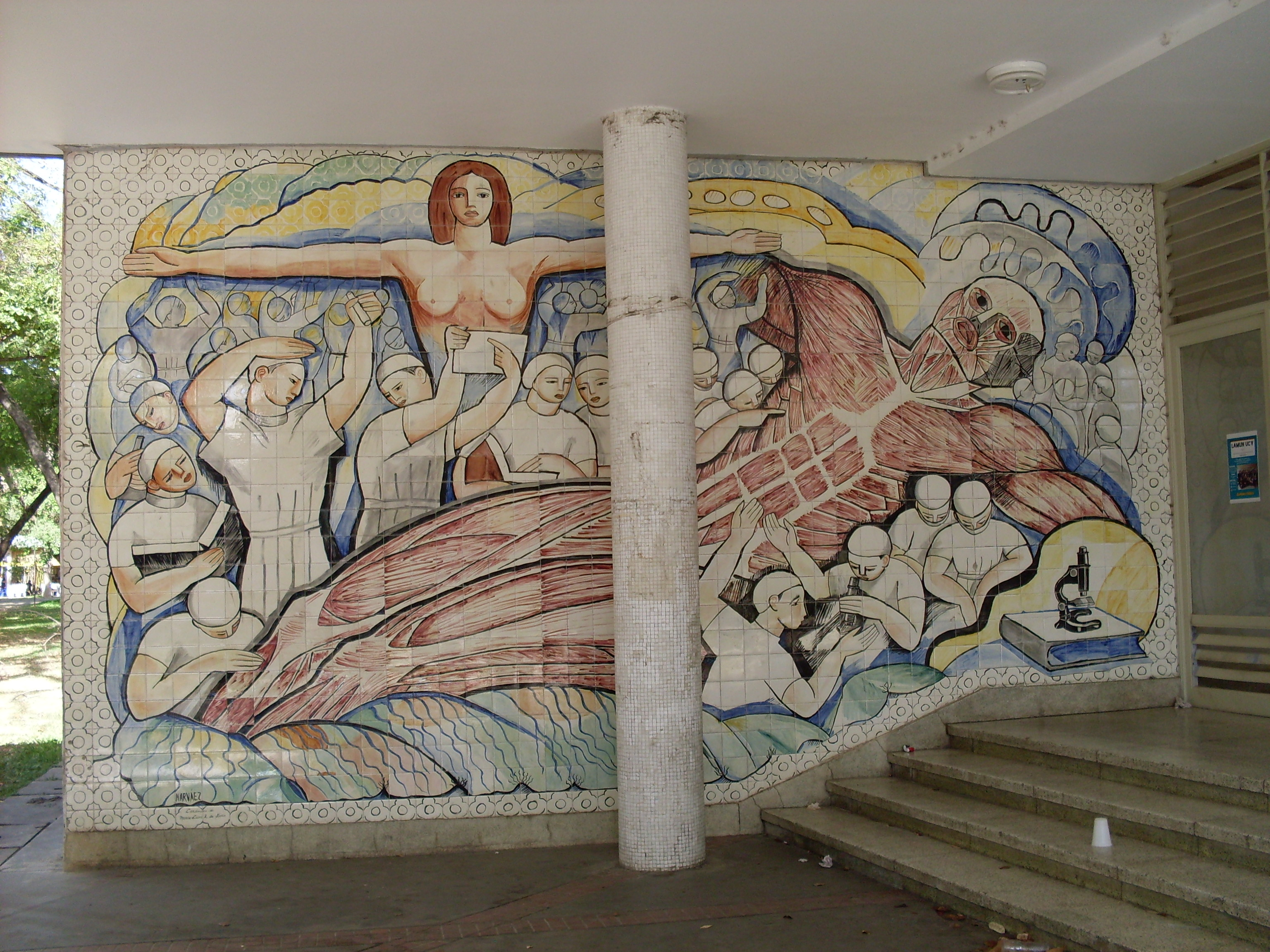
Untitled mural, 1950–51, José Izquierdo Institute of Anatomy

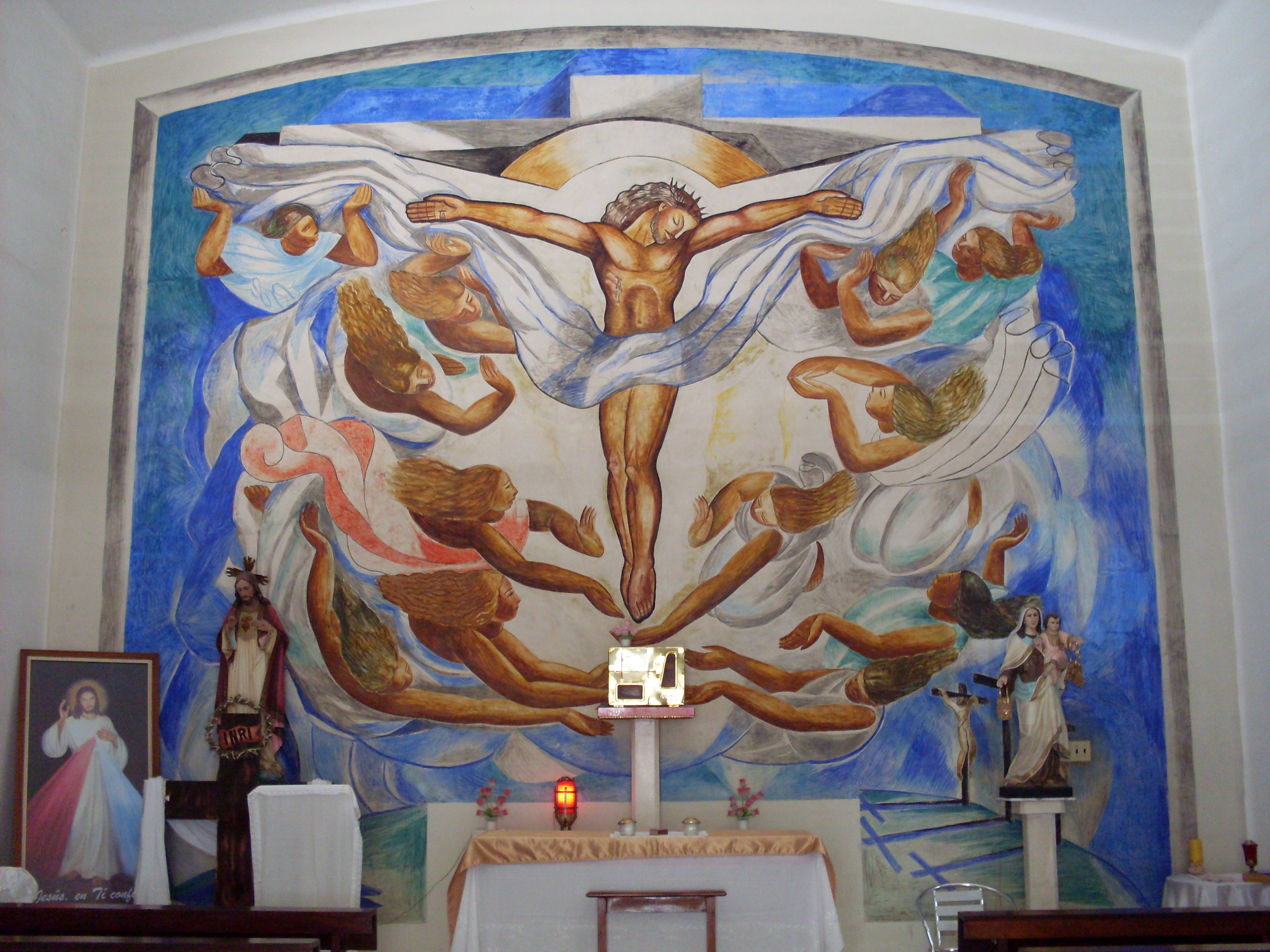
Cristo, 1950, Chapel of the University Hospital

== Other murals ==
=== Untitled sea life mural ===
Year: 1951

A mosaic mural of a sea life scene, including fish, a shark, and an octopus. It is on the wall of a former university dining space, and was damaged during renovations there in 1982. As a result of this damage, the Unidad de Conservación de Obras de Arte (Artwork Conservation Unit) was created: a group of architects and university council students who wished to preserve all of Narváez' artworks at the campus. The university management approved the group when they realized the extent of the damage.

=== Untitled wooden mural ===
Year: 1956

A wooden mural in relief located in the library of the Botanical Institute. There is another mural in the botanical center, by Wifredo Lam. The architectural design of the botanical center's buildings incorporates features to play with light and shadow; the relief murals are said to illuminate the buildings.

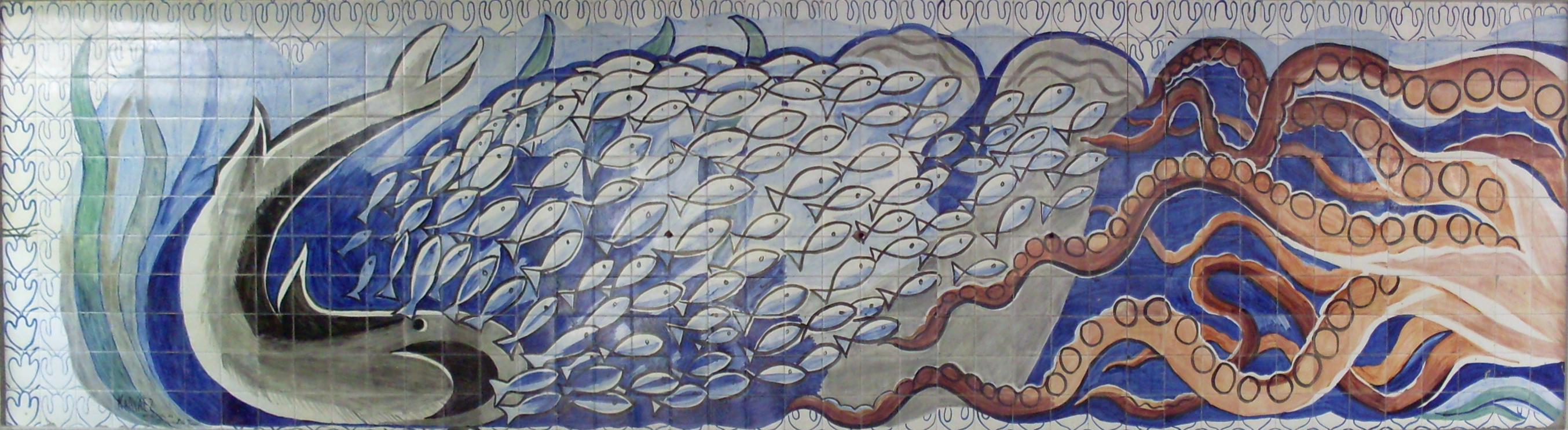
Sea life mural, 1951, former university dining space

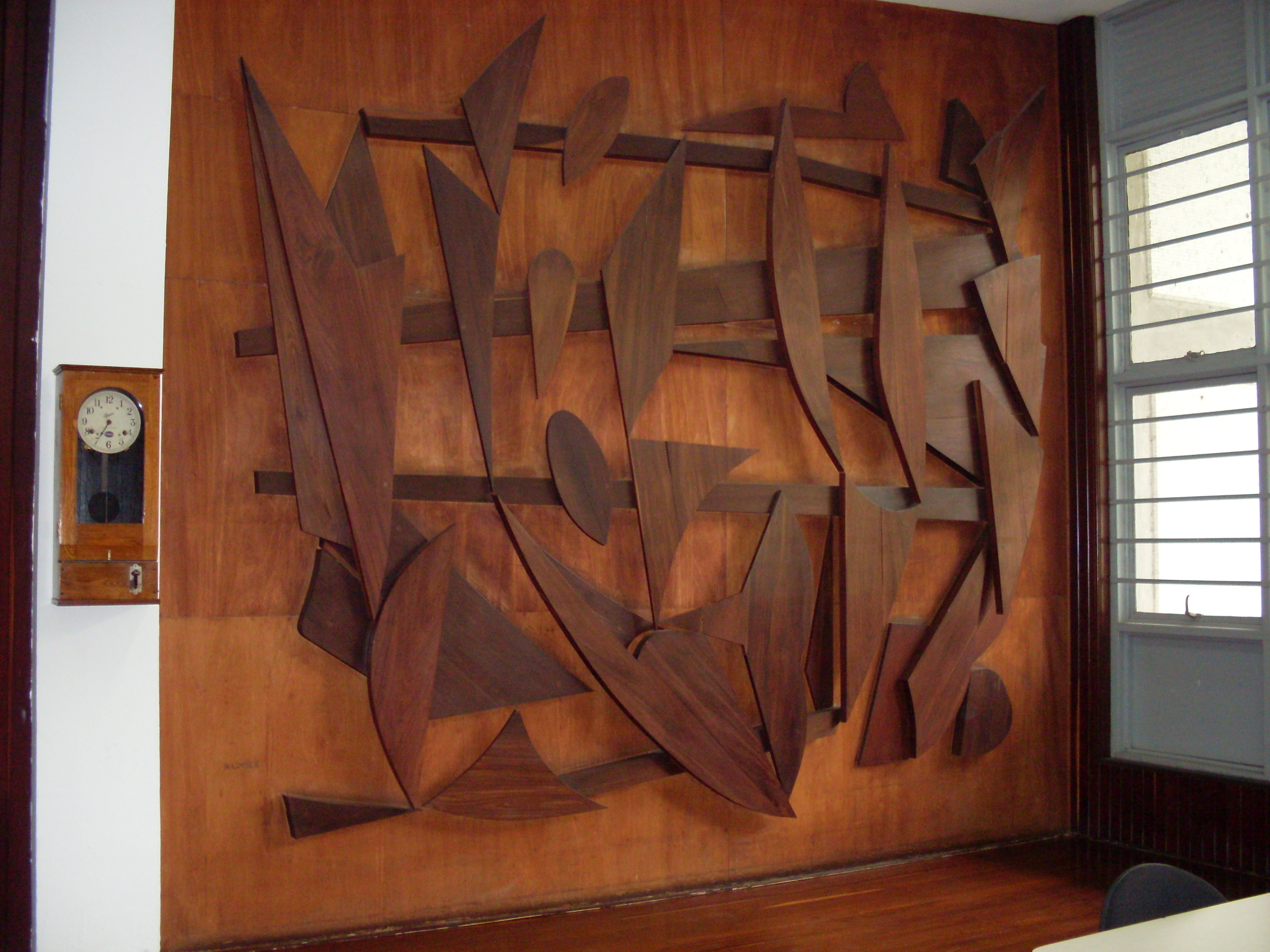
Wooden mural, 1956, Botanical Institute

== Other sculptures ==
=== Untitled sculpture of José Gregorio Hernández ===
Year: 1953

A bronze patina sculpture cast in 1950, the José Gregorio Hernández figure is at the entrance to the Institute of Experimental Medicine. It depicts in relief, from left to right, Dr. Hernández, a microscope on books, and an inscription (in Spanish). The inscription reads:

Dr. José Gregorio Hernández. Sabio y filántropo fundador de la Medicina Experimental en Venezuela el 6 de noviembre de 1891. Nació en Isnotú, estado Trujillo, el 26 de octubre de 1864. Murió en Caracas el 29 de junio de 1919. La Junta Militar de Gobierno de los Estados Unidos de Venezuela al ilustre sabio trujillano Dr. José Gregorio Hernández. 1950.

Doctor José Gregorio Hernández. Sage and philanthropist who began experimental medicine in Venezuela on 6 November 1891. He was born in Isnotú, Trujillo state, on 26 October 1864. He died in Caracas on 29 June 1919. From the Military Board of the government of the United States of Venezuela, to the illustrious wise man from Trujillo, Doctor José Gregorio Hernández. 1950.

Hernández enrolled at UCV in 1882 for medical studies; throughout his six years there, he established himself as the best student in the whole university. He would later return to the university to found various laboratories for different experimental medical practices, and become a professor, a position he held for 28 years. After his death, Hernández' stature began to reach mythic proportions. People around the country started claiming to have been granted miracles after praying to him. In 1949, the Venezuelan Catholic Church began the process of determining whether or not Hernández was eligible for sainthood; in 1985 the Vatican granted him the title of Venerable, and he was beatified in 2021.

In 1947, the students and faculty of the Institute of Experimental Medicine petitioned for their building to receive a dedication to Hernández; this passed at the university level unanimously, then went through the Academy of Medicine before being delivered to the Venezuelan government. The government, as well as approving the dedication, recommended that a bust be made of Hernández to display at the building.

=== La cultura ===
Year: 1954

La cultura (identified as "Sculpture" in Valerie Fraser's book), was made later in his creative cycle and is more figurative than his earlier works, reflecting the greater influence that European artists had on his style starting with this piece. It is located in the Plaza del Rectorado (Rectory Plaza), at the northwest end rather than the center, and is made of bronze. It has been moved around the campus prior to being in Rectory Plaza, previously on the terrace of the Biblioteca central and then between the Institute of Experimental Medicine and the Institute of Anatomy. The sculpture was restored in 1983, in the first group of restorations in the campus.

=== Torso ===
Year: 1956

A separate work by Narváez, Torso was originally featured as part of an exhibition at the university in the A. Planchart and Cia. Sucres. C.A. hall. The wooden sculpture depicting a female torso later became part of the artwork collection of the Faculty of Architecture and Urban Planning (FAU). It is now on the eighth floor of the FAU, in the dean's office.

Narváez made several Torso works, which reflect the influence of Greek sculpture on his art, working the wood until it shined like classical stone statues. In his wooden torsos, Narváez would cut the sculpture based on the natural design of the wood, and would polish it to highlight the grain and tone of the material; this is in contrast to the artistry of his earlier wooden sculptures, which were often dyed black to look like stone.

=== Dr. José María Vargas ===
Year: 1987

Located in the Rectory Plaza and depicting the titular former president, the bust was installed in a ceremony for the bicentennial of his birth. Edmundo Chirinos, the rector at the time, unveiled it. Narváez had created at least one earlier bust of Vargas, in 1948, for a school in Florida.

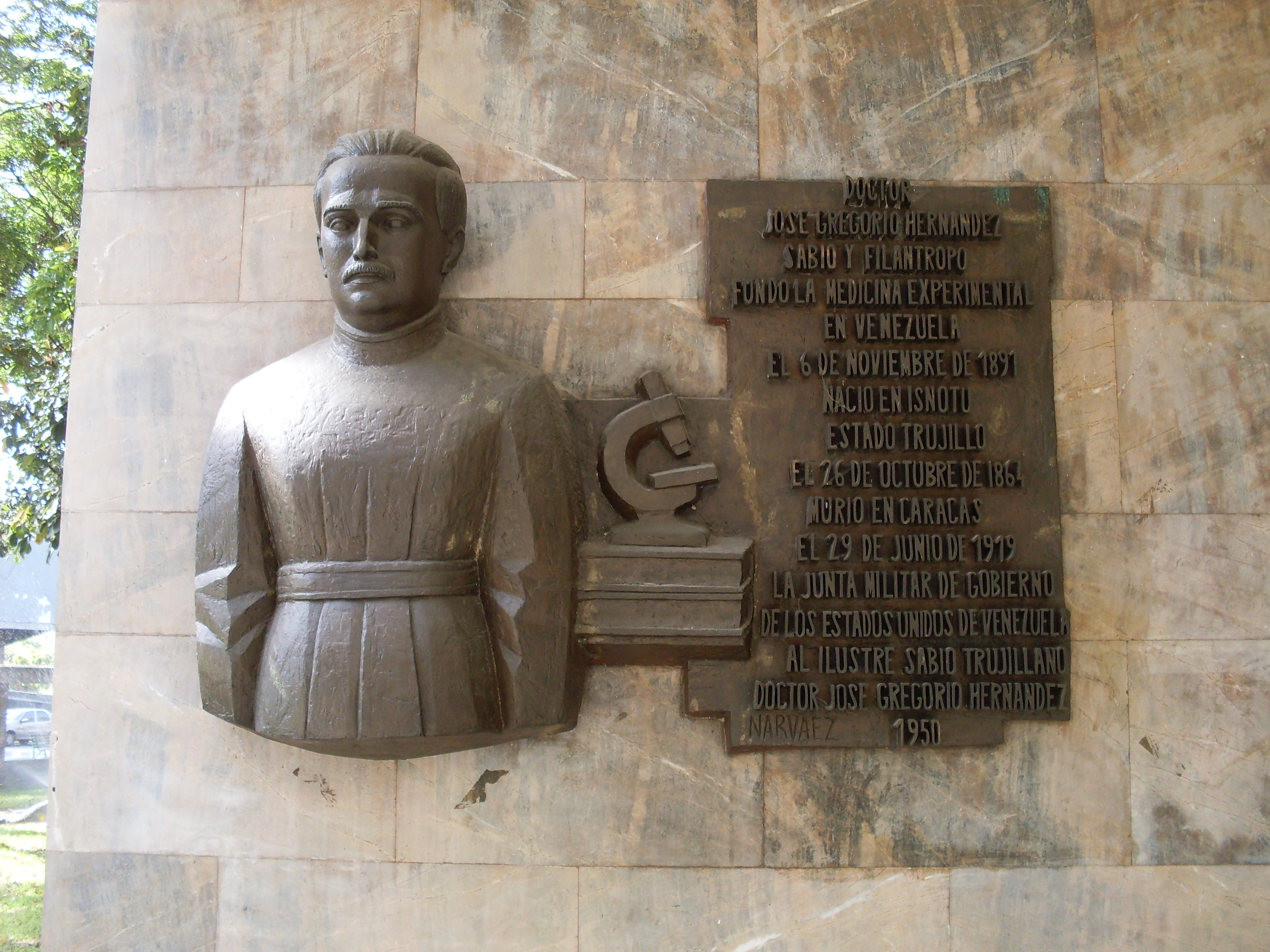
José Gregorio Hernández sculpture, 1953, Institute of Experimental Medicine

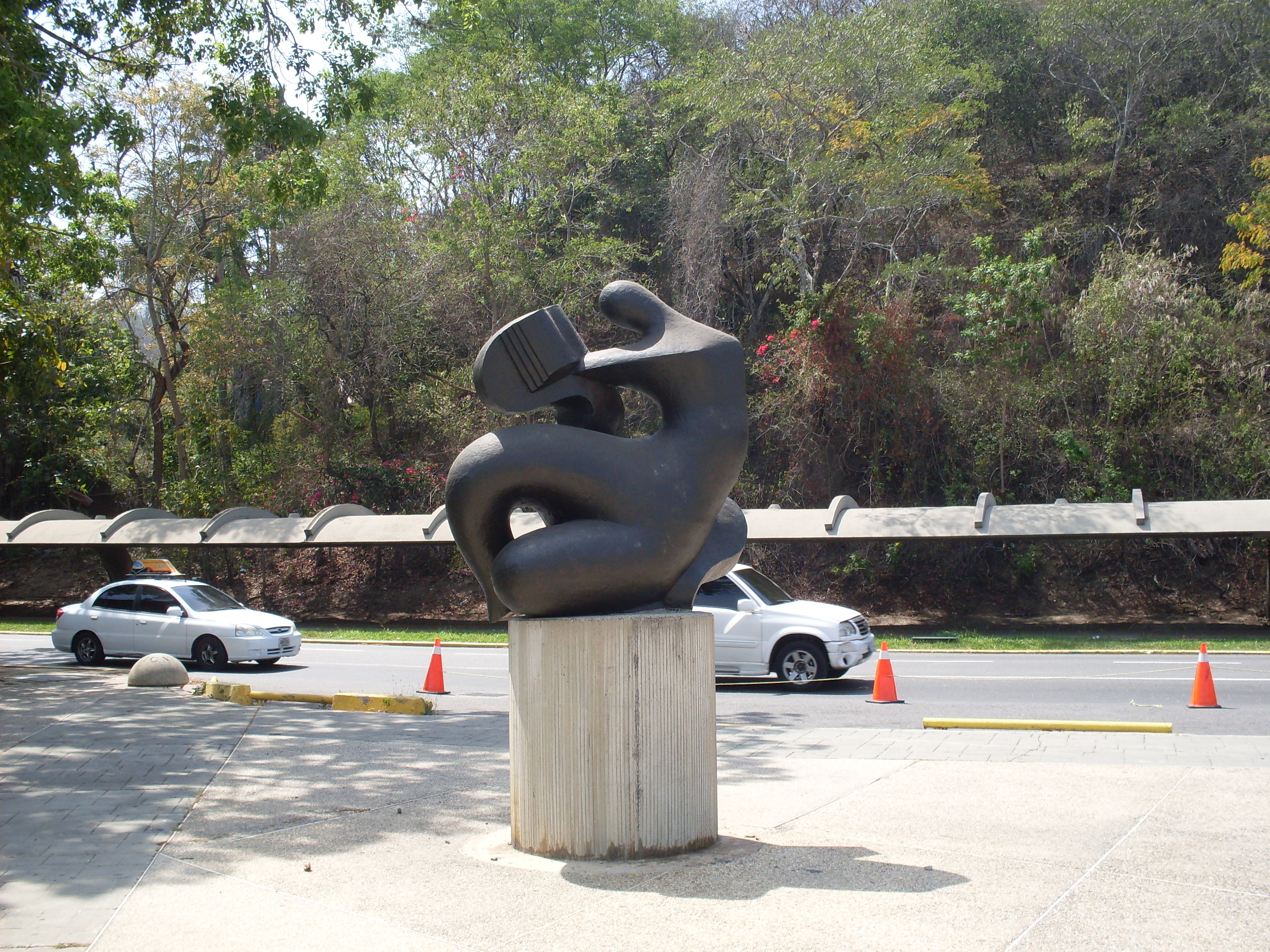
La cultura, 1954, Rectory Plaza

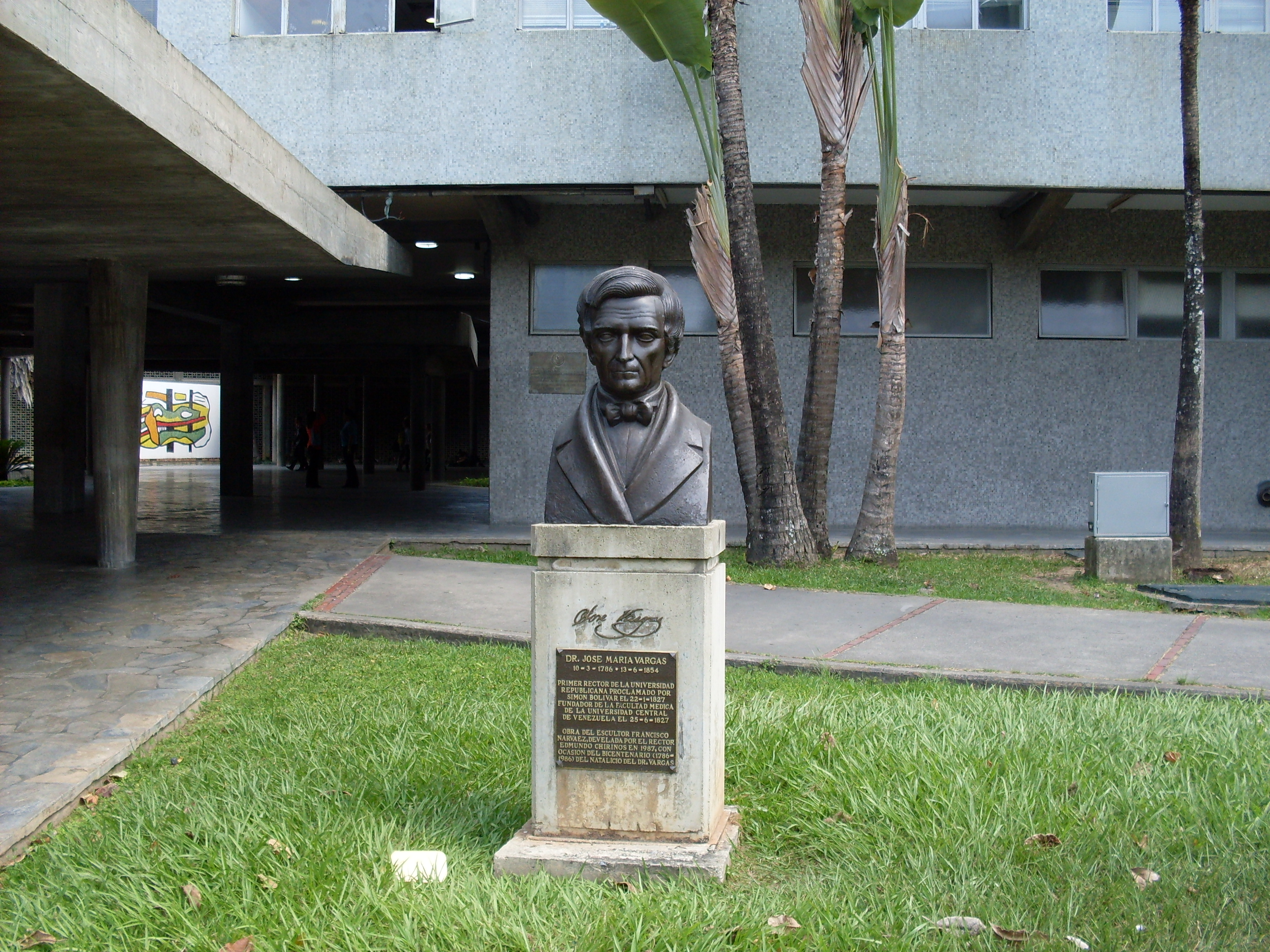
Dr. José María Vargas, 1987, Rectory Plaza

== Map of artworks ==
Map of Francisco Narváez artworks in University City of Caracas (Note: Adapted from a map of murals, artwork listings, a map of the FAU, a map of the cultural center, a pamphlet on art in several other locations, as well as other public access maps of the campus and artwork location descriptions)

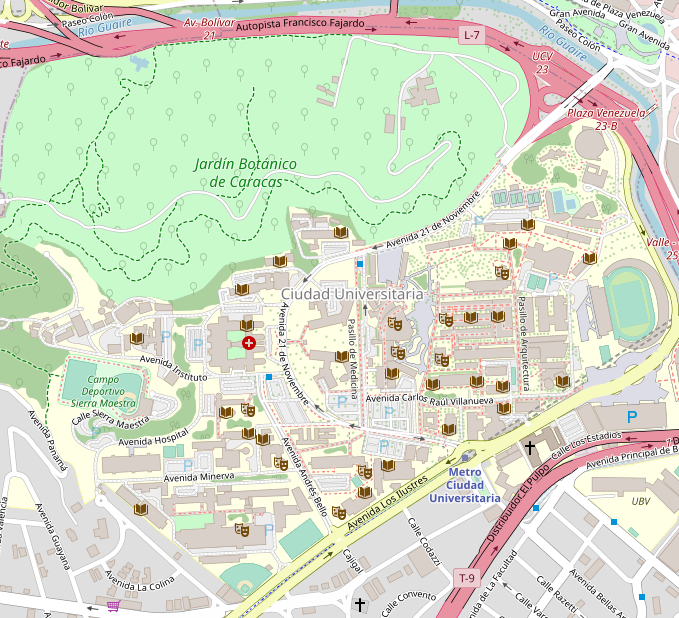

== See also ==
- List of artworks in University City of Caracas
