= Rafael Parratoro =

Venezuelan visual artist

- Born: October 17, 1977 (age 48); Caracas, Venezuela
- Other name: "Parratoro"
- Education: Central University of Venezuela
- Occupation: Visual artist
- Years active: 1999-present

Rafael Parratoro (Caracas, October 17, 1977), also known as just Parratoro, is an Argentine-Venezuelan visual artist specializing in kinetic, optical, and augmented reality art. Recognized for his innovation in the moiré technique, he has exhibited his work in cities like New York, Berlin, Mexico City, Luxembourg, and Buenos Aires.

One of his notable projects is POP AR, a book that combines printed art with augmented reality, funded through crowdfunding and distributed internationally. He has also collaborated with global brands, including the design of the Google Maps Platform Awards and the creation of augmented reality installations for Nike.

He has been recognized as "one of the leading figures in contemporary optical and kinetic art" and as "a pioneer in the use of augmented reality as an artistic technique."

== Biography ==
=== Early years ===
Rafael Parratoro was born on 1977 in Caracas, Venezuela. He studied engineering at the Central University of Venezuela, whose campus was declared a UNESCO World Heritage Site and Open Air Museum. There he became interested in the visual arts, inspired by the work of Venezuelan artists such as Jesús Rafael Soto, Gego, Víctor Valera, Carlos Cruz-Diez, Gerd Leufert and Carlos Raúl Villanueva; and international artists such as Alexander Calder, Víctor Vasarely, Jean Arp, Sophie Taeuber-Arp and Joan Miró.

=== Decade of 2010 ===
Initially he worked as a 3D art developer for the video game industry with the company MP Game Studio, with which he made creations for companies such as Nickelodeon, DreamWorks and Cartoon Network. In 2013 he was part of the Pictoplasma Academy, a training program in visual arts and character creation developed by the German organization of the same name. He later co-founded a collective named The Eggplant, along with other visual artists.

Based in Buenos Aires, Argentina, since 2008, in the 2010s his work began to appear in several exhibitions around the world. In 2014 he was part of the group exhibition Pictoplasma at the Urban Spree gallery in Berlin, Germany and at the Museum of Contemporary Art in Monterrey, Mexico. Between 2014 and 2016 he participated in several exhibitions of the Curator's Voice Project in Miami, Florida, and in 2015 he presented a solo exhibition entitled "Moiréph" in Buenos Aires in honor of the writer Jorge Luis Borges. A year later he presented "La Evolución de la Forma" at the Borges Cultural Center, and participated in the group exhibition "Ni una menos", both in Buenos Aires.

After participating in the Planck Festival of Digital Art in Buenos Aires, in 2017 he presented the solo exhibition "1 es a 1" at the Espacio O Gallery and at the Biblioteca Viva in Santiago de Chile, and made the mapping intervention of the Obelisk of Buenos Aires in commemoration of the thirty years of the Garrahan Hospital. In 2018 he participated in the group exhibition "La Ruta del Color" at Aura Galerías in Mexico City and presented a new solo show in Buenos Aires, entitled "Arte en Movimiento".

=== Decade of 2020 and present day ===
After participating in Miami with the group collection "Filled Parcels", in 2020 he was part of the "Digital Diderot Exhibition", a virtual space of augmented reality simulation developed in the Argentine capital.

Through the crowdfunding platform Kickstarter, Parratoro published the real-time animation book Pop on Pop, in which he presents 110 designs of his authorship. His work was included in Outside the Lines Too, a book published by Penguin Group in which artists such as Ryan Humphrey, Rainer Judd, Richard Colman and Jim Houser also participate. He also designed the game Frenetic Kinetic for the mobile platforms IOS and Android.

In 2021 he collaborated with photographer Gian Paolo Minelli in the show "Sonata de Cruces Posibles", exhibited at the Museo de Fotografía Itinerante FoLa in Buenos Aires. In 2022 he intervened the corporeal logo of the Lollapalooza Festival in Buenos Aires that welcomes the event, and made an augmented reality installation at the same festival. He designed the monumental facade of Tiendas Landmark in Unicenter Shopping in Greater Buenos Aires, which was defined by Forbes magazine as "disruptive and with movement".

In 2023 he was called by the organization of the Gardel Awards to design a new visual identity for the ceremony with a combination of optical art and augmented reality. The same year he participated in the exhibition "X Universe" at the event La Nuit de la Culture in Esch-sur-Alzette, Luxembourg, presented the exhibition "Favaloro x 100 pre" at the Museum of Latin American Art in Buenos Aires in a tribute to René Favaloro, and made an intervention on the facade of the US Embassy in the Bosch Palace in Buenos Aires on the occasion of LGBT pride week. Since 2023 he has a permanent collection at the Museo Della Luce in Rome, Italy.

In 2024 Parratoro participated in the monumental sculpture "Resquicio cuántico: una obra de arte extraterrestre", exhibited at the Museo Campo in the town of Cañuelas.

In 2025, Google commissioned him to design and create the Google Maps Platform Awards, a series of sculptures combining elements of kinetic art, resin, and optical geometry, conceived to represent the relationship between technology and contemporary art. That same year, he released POP AR, an interactive art book that integrates print and augmented reality. The project was funded through the crowdfunding platform Kickstarter, where it received the Project We Love distinction, and was later distributed in more than 20 countries. The book features 26 works that include QR codes to activate three-dimensional animations, merging digital elements with the printed format.

In 2026, Parratoro was a speaker at TEDxBarrioSanNicolasSalon, held at the UAI's Auditorio Cisneros in Buenos Aires, with the talk "1 + 1 = 3: La creatividad necesita límites". That same year, he created a large-format artistic intervention for the facade of the second Magic optical store by Alain Afflelou in Spain, located at the Islazul shopping center in Madrid; the work covered more than 18 meters of the store's exterior.

== Style ==
Rafael Parra Toro's work is characterized by the development of kinetic and optical art in both physical and digital versions. He is a pioneer of artistic creation through the use of augmented reality and creates his works using the moiré technique, which is based on the superimposition of lines of division, in addition to relying on computer and mathematical tools applied to digital art. Parratoro is recognized as "one of the leading exponents of optical and kinetic art today".

== Exhibitions ==
=== Group ===
- 2014 - "Pictoplasma", Urban Spree, Berlin, Germany
- 2014 - "Pictoplasma", Museo de Arte Contemporáneo de Monterrey, Mexico
- 2014 - "Fonzo", Curator's Voice Project, Miami, United States
- 2014 - "Concepts", Curator's Voice Project, Miami, United States
- 2014 - "Beautified Objects", Curator's Voice Project, Miami, United States
- 2014 - "Miami-Miami", Curator's Voice Project, Miami, United States
- 2014 - "Things of Beauty", Curator's Voice Project, Miami, United States
- 2014 - "(Re) Vision", 1199 First Avenue, New York, United States
- 2015 - "The Softline", Curator's Voice Project, Miami, United States
- 2015 - "Memory", Schwerdter Strasse, Berlin, Germany
- 2015 - "Premium", Curator's Voice Project, Miami, United States
- 2016 - "Upfront", Curator's Voice Project, Miami, United States
- 2016 - "Il Primato dello Sguardo", Messina, Italy
- 2016 - "Ni una Menos", Buenos Aires, Argentina
- 2016 - "Nei Luoghi Della Bellezza", Santa Caterina, Italy
- 2016 - "Planck Festival of Digital Art", Buenos Aires, Argentina
- 2018 - "La Ruta del Color", Aura Galerías, Mexico City
- 2020 - "Diderot Digital Exhibition", Buenos Aires, Argentina
- 2021 - "NFT Art Week", Beijing, China
- 2021 - "Sonata de Cruces Posibles", FoLa Museum, Buenos Aires, Argentina
- 2021 - "World Padel Tour", Buenos Aires, Argentina
- 2021 - "Resquicio cuántico: una obra de arte extraterrestre", Campo de Cañuelas Museum, Argentina
- 2022 - "Bitcoin Fair", Miami, United States
- 2022 - "Latin American Bitcoin & Blockchain Conference", Buenos Aires, Argentina
- 2022 - "Ciudad Emergente Festival", Buenos Aires, Argentina
- 2023 - "Feria MAPA", Buenos Aires, Argentina
- 2023 - "X Universe: La Nuit de la Culture", Esch-sur-Alzette, Luxembourg
- 2023 - "Big X", Belval Plaza, Esch-sur-Alzette, Luxembourg
- 2023 - "Favaloro x 100pre", MALBA, Buenos Aires, Argentina
- 2023 - Permanent Collection in Museum Della Luce, Rome, Italy
- 2024 - Intervention on the facade of the U.S. Embassy, Bosch Palace, Buenos Aires, Argentina
- 2024 - "Resquicio cuántico", Campo de Cañuelas Museum, Buenos Aires, Argentina
- 2024 - "Nike AR Swoosh", Galerías Pacífico, Buenos Aires, Argentina.

=== Individual ===
- 2015 - "Moiréph", Borges Cultural Center, Buenos Aires, Argentina
- 2015 - "The Evolution of Form", Borges Cultural Center, Buenos Aires, Argentina
- 2016 - "Arcobaleno", Buenos Aires, Argentina
- 2017 - "1 is to 1", Espacio O and Biblioteca Viva, Santiago de Chile
- 2017 - "Mapping of the Obelisk of Buenos Aires", Argentina
- 2018 - "Art in Motion", Adriana Budich Gallery, Buenos Aires, Argentina
- 2019 - "Rafael Parratoro», Hotel Marriott W, Mexico City
- 2019 - "1 is to 1", Los Andes, Chile
- 2019 - "Live Performance", Museo de Arte Contemporáneo de La Boca, Buenos Aires, Argentina
- 2019 - "Imaginable, posible", Öss Café, Buenos Aires, Argentina
- 2020 - Videoclip of "Somos Love" from Vicky Maurette, Buenos Aires, Argentina
- 2022 - "Tres Punto Cero", Cott Gallery, Buenos Aires, Argentina
- 2022 - "El tercer pasajero", ESADE Business School, Buenos Aires, Argentina
- 2022 - "Renault NTFs", Usina del Arte, Buenos Aires, Argentina
- 2022 - Monumental Facade of Landmark Stores in Unicenter Shopping, Greater Buenos Aires, Argentina
- 2022 - Intervention of the corporeal logo, Lollapalooza, Buenos Aires, Argentina
- 2022 - "DAM", Centro Cultura Plaza Castelli, Buenos Aires, Argentina
- 2023 - Total artistic concept, Gardel Awards, Buenos Aires, Argentina
- 2023 - Digital plastic, ArtLab, Buenos Aires, Argentina
- 2024 - Movistar Arena mural, Buenos Aires, Argentina
- 2025 - "El aire como soporte", ArtLab, Buenos Aires, Argentina
- 2025 - "Obra expandida", Marco Museum in La Boca, Buenos Aires, Argentina
- 2026 - Artistic intervention of the fecade of Alain Afflelou's Magic optical store, Islazul Shopping Center, Madrid, Spain.
