= Alfredo Boulton =

Venezuelan artist and historian

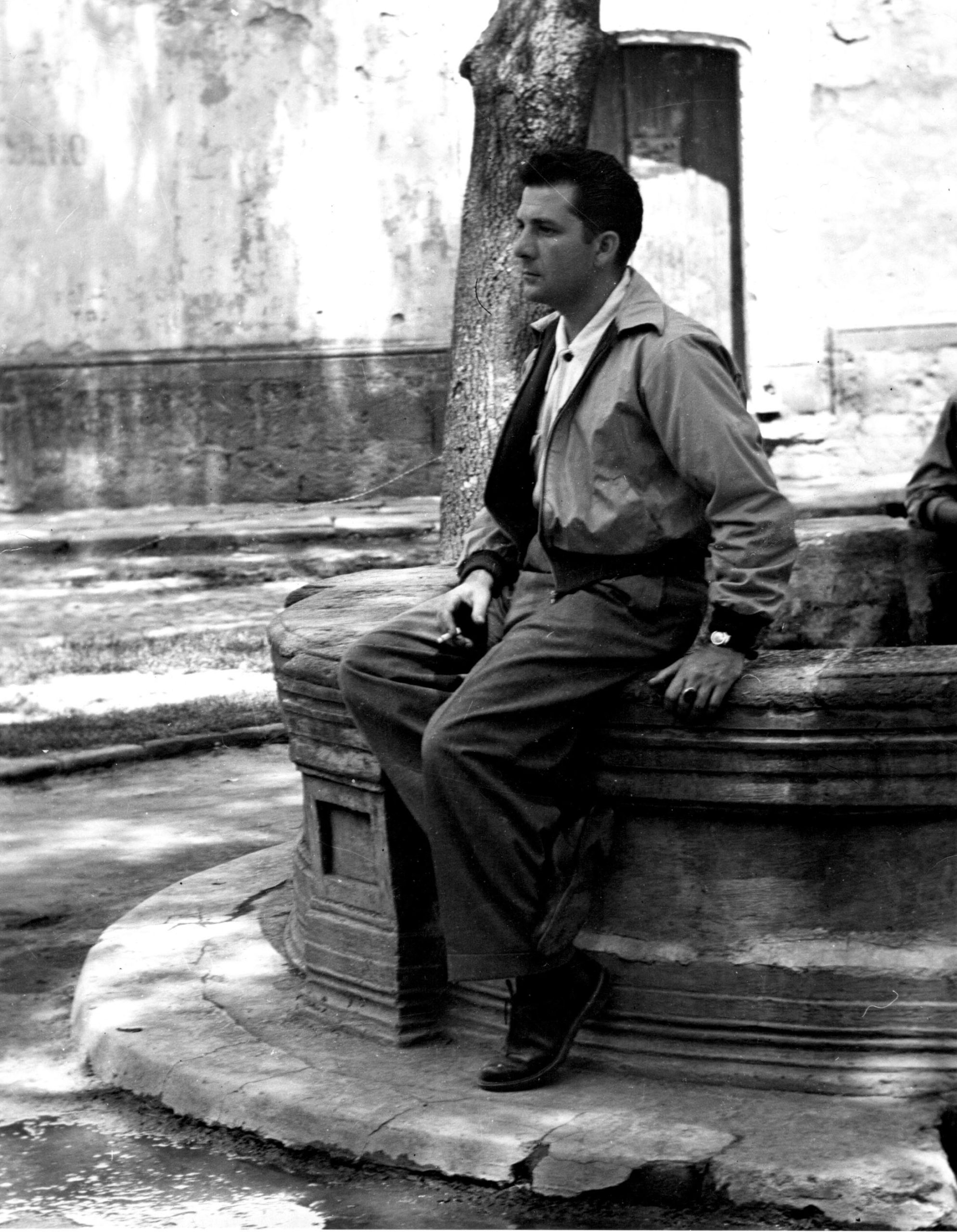
- Boulton in 1941
- Born: 1908; Caracas, Venezuela
- Died: 1945 (aged 36–37)
- Known for: photography; art history and criticism

Alfredo Boulton (1908–1995) was a Venezuelan artist, critic, and art historian. As an art historian and critic, he is known for publishing a comprehensive history of Venezuelan art. Boulton was also an active photographer; his work is held in the permanent collection of the Museum of Modern Art in New York City.

== Life and work ==
Boulton was born in 1908 in Caracas to a wealthy merchant family. Boulton's first photographs, made in the early 1930s, were influenced by European and American photography, particularly the work of Man Ray and the Surrealist movement.

After returning to Venezuela, Boulton's work turned toward depicting and engaging with his home country. He was one of the first photographers to document the Venezuelan landscape and people, inventing the term belleza criolla to describe “the exuberant beauty of our race” (the Venezuelan mixture of indigenous, white, and black backgrounds). He also promoted, documented, and studied indigenous artwork from Venezuela. The following quote from Boulton illustrates the connection that this documentation of ceramics has with his overall approach to Venezuelan art history:

It is true that indigenous Venezuelan culture has been relatively little studied: but even so, such testimony as I have described is appropriate for my purpose, which is – as I must state at the outset – of a purely aesthetic and not an anthropological kind. My desire is to grasp with both hands an instant of that life, and in that instant to open my eyes to see – to see ourselves – before we begin to look at others. The space of time involved is so short, and at the same time so long, that if we do not do our looking in that fleeting instant of life we cannot see life.

As an art historian and critic, he published a comprehensive history of Venezuelan art and a monographs on the iconographic portraiture of Simón Bolívar, Antonio José de Sucre, and José Antonio Páez.

He often photographed and supported other Venezuelan artists and intellectuals, including Francisco Narváez, Rafael Monasterios, Alejandro Otero, Jesús Rafael Soto, and Carlos Cruz Diez. He was also a friend to international artists, notably, Alexander Calder designed a piece of kinetic art for his living room.

A monograph has been published on Boulton's work, entitled Alfredo Boulton: Looking at Venezuela 1929–1978.

== Collections ==
The Getty Center houses a collection of his artwork and writings (many previously from the Alberto Vollmer Foundation), a selection of which were on display in the exhibit Alfredo Boulton: Looking at Venezuela, 1928–1978. Over 25 of Boulton's photographs are held in the permanent collection of the Museum of Modern Art.

== See also ==
- Los Notables
