= Alejandro Chataing =

Venezuelan architect (1873–1928)

Alejandro Chataing (1873-1928) was an important Venezuelan architect. Chataing, a disciple of Juan Hurtado Manrique, was known as the "great constructor of the regime of Cipriano Castro." He was a prolific architect who helped give Caracas a new face.

In general, his projects demonstrated a remarkable eclecticism, with tendencies that included neo-Renaissance, neo-Romanesque, morisco and neo-Baroque. At the same time, next to the traditional Venezuelan rubblework, he used concrete foundations, as well as iron joists in the intrafloor space, a method characteristic of the transitional period between the 19th and 20th centuries.

== Early life ==
Chataing was born in Caracas, Venezuela.

== Career ==
His career began when he received first prize in a contest for the facades of the San Jacinto Caracas town market in 1894. In 1895, he collaborated with his teacher, Juan Hurtado Manrique, in the design of the Arch of the Federation on the slopes of El Calvario.

=== Projects of 1904 and 1905 ===
In 1904, he rebuilt the National Pantheon and constructed the presidential residence of Cipriano Castro in el Paraíso, called Villa Zoila. A year later he modified the structure and the facade of the Military School of la Planicie, with a project imitating the strength of "florentino military style." Between 1904 and 1905, he constructed the National theater, which president Cipriano Castro wished to have emulate the works of Antonio Guzmán Blanco. In 1905 he designed the House of Baths in El Valle and modified the School of Arts and offices.

=== Projects of 1906 ===
In 1906, he took on the project of the construction of a hospital for leprosy patients for the island of La Providencia (es) (at the entrance of Lake Maracaibo) and of an Arch of the Restoration that would not be completed.

=== Projects of 1907 ===
In 1907, he completed the palace of the Department of the Interior with the annexed police ward and constructed the building of the Ministry of Housing on the corner of Carmelitas.

=== Other architectural works ===
Other architectural works made by Chataing were the National Library (or Bolivarian Museum) in Bolivar plaza in 1910, the General Archives of the Nation in 1912, the New Circus in 1919 in collaboration with Luis Muñoz Tébar, and the Arch of Carabobo inaugurated by Juan Vicente Gómez in 1921. Also with Luis Muñoz Tébar, he finished the church of Heart of Jesus in Caracas, the temple of Saint Augustine of the South and the church of the Servants of the Santísimo Sacramento. In addition to the construction of religious buildings, he took on the project of designing the theaters Ayacucho, Capitol, Princess (today, Rialto cinema in front of Bolivar plaza), the First National City Bank (on the corner of Society) and the Bank of Venezuela on University Avenue. He constructed Las Acacias residence of the Boulton family (today, host of the Command of the National Guard) and conceived the design of the Miramar hotel in Macuto, a project that brought him recognition in 1928.
