= Francisco Narváez =

Venezuelan sculptor and painter (1905–1982)

- Francisco José Narváez
- Born: Francisco José Narváez; October 4, 1905; Porlamar, Venezuela
- Died: July 13, 1982 (aged 76); Caracas, Venezuela
- Education: Academy of Fine Arts, Caracas; Académie Julian, Paris
- Known for: Sculpture, painting, public art
- Notable work: Las Toninas (Plaza O'Leary), Education, Science, The Athlete, Armonía de Volúmenes y Espacio
- Style: Modernism, ethnic abstraction
- Movement: Venezuelan modern art
- Awards: Premio Nacional de Escultura de Venezuela (1941), Premio Nacional de Pintura de Venezuela (1948)

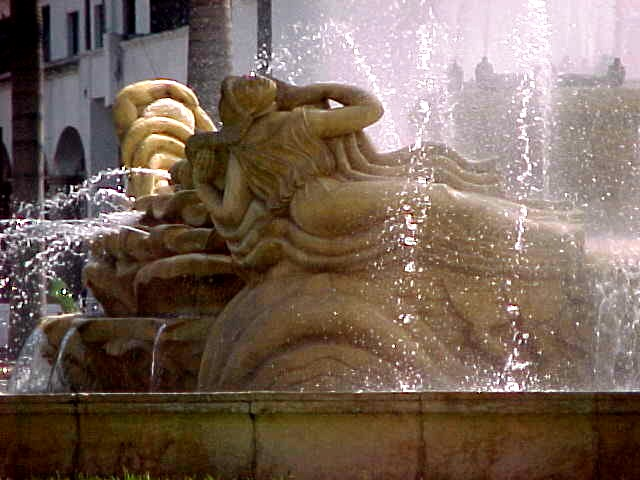
"Las Toninas" (The Dolphins) in the Plaza O'Leary

Francisco José Narváez (4 October 1905, Porlamar – 13 July 1982, Caracas) was a Venezuelan sculptor and painter who is perhaps best known for "Las Toninas", a sculptural group that decorates the fountain of the Plaza O'Leary in Caracas. His work is characterized by a strong ethnic component and he made extensive use of local materials.

== Life and works ==
Narváez was the son of a cabinetmaker and restorer. While he was still very young, the family moved to Caracas and he began his studies at the Academy of Fine Arts. In 1928, he left for Paris where he attended the Académie Julian and established connections with the artistic community in Montparnasse. He returned to Venezuela in 1931 and, a few years later, began to work with the architect Carlos Raúl Villanueva, who commissioned him to supply sculptures for his projects, including the Plaza of Carabobo Park, the facade for the Museum of Fine Arts, the Museum of Natural Sciences and the Plaza O'Leary.

In 1939, he travelled to New York to decorate the Venezuelan pavilion at the World's Fair and exhibited his works "Café y Frutas" (now in the Andrés Bello Lyceum) and "Perlas y Cacao" (now in the Fermín Toro Lyceum).

In 1941, Narváez received the Premio Nacional de Escultura of Venezuela, and, in 1948, the Premio Nacional de Pintura of Venezuela. The recognitions established him as a leader of modernism in Venezuela.

In 1952, he completed an equestrian statue of Rafael Urdaneta which is now on display in the Plaza La Candelaria. Later, he collaborated with Villanueva to create several pieces for the University City of Caracas, which was conceived as a "synthesis of the Arts". "Education", "Science", "The Athlete" and the bust of José María Vargas are some of his works located on the campus of the Central University of Venezuela.

In 1981 and 1982, he created two sculptures of monumental proportions. One of them, "Gran Volumen", was made for the Amuay Refinery Complex and the other, one of his last completed works, the "Armonía de Volúmenes y Espacio", was for Caracas Metro. It is located in a plaza that was later named for him.

== See also ==
- Art of Francisco Narváez in University City of Caracas
