= Armando Reverón =

Venezuelan painter

- Born: Armando Reverón; May 10, 1889; Caracas, Venezuela
- Died: September 17, 1954 (aged 65); Caracas, Venezuela
- Education: Academy of Fine Arts (Caracas), other private instruction
- Known for: Painting, sculpture, dolls ("muñecas")
- Notable work: Maja (c. 1933), Woman of the River (1939), White Landscape (1940)
- Style: Impressionism, Arte Povera, Expressionism
- Movement: Venezuelan modernism
- Awards: First Prize, Ateneo de Caracas; 1933
- Memorials: Reverón Museum, Macuto (damaged in 1999)

Armando Reverón (May 10, 1889 – September 17, 1954) was a Venezuelan painter and sculptor, precursor of Arte Povera and considered one of the most important of the 20th century in Latin America. While his mental health deteriorated throughout his life, his artistic abilities remained. His house by the northern coast of Venezuela housed the Reveron Museum, although it was severely damaged by the Vargas mudslides in December 1999. He is the subject of various homages in different media, and is remembered for his "muñecas" or dolls.

== Biography ==
He began his studies at the Colegio de los Padres Salesianos in Caracas. His maternal great-uncle, Ricardo Montilla, who had studied in New York, teaches him natural drawing and awakens his artistic vocation; his interest in painting was manifest from childhood. In 1896 he was transferred to Valencia after the failure of his parents' marriage. Armando is sent home from Rodríguez-Zocca's family, who took care of his early education.

Under the care of Rodríguez-Zocca's family, Reverón established a close relationship with Josefina, the daughter of the couple, and came to appreciate her like his own sister. The walls of the house were some of the first paintings of Reverón, where he attempted to portray the family maid, Juanita Carrizales. Rodríguez-Zocca's described Reverón's temperament as "sad, angry and melancholic". At the age of 12 he suffered typhus, which many believe psychically affected him for the rest of his life.

== Artistic changes ==
Reverón built several huts in the land that he bought in Macuto, the main hut was his workshop; the walls were timber and the roof thatched. Around his waist he placed a large bag to hold his driftwood-made brushes.

The decision to move also coincided with a change of behavior and a transformation of his artistic concepts. During this period, by adopting primitive habits and detached from the city, Reverón could develop a deeper understanding of nature; this led him to develop his particular method of painting using native elements, and adopting procedures and materials that suited his desire to represent the atmosphere of the landscape under the dazzling effects produced by direct sunlight.

Thus entered what the critic Alfredo Boulton called his Período Blanco, located roughly between 1924 and 1932. The GAN (Galeria de Arte Nacional) possesses an important collection of photographs by Alfredo Boulton of Reverón. These photographs contain a series of Reverón painting Luisa Phelps dated 1930. In 1933, he won a first award to be an exhibition of his work at the Ateneo de Caracas, which was then presented in the gallery Katia Granoff in Paris, France.

In early 1940, he began his Período Sepia, which corresponds to a set of canvases painted on the coast and in the port of La Guaira in which brown tones are dominant in landscapes of land and sea. He subsequently suffered a period of depression following a psychotic breakdown which forced confinement in "San Jorge" sanatorium from "José María Finol". Once recovered, he worked in a different style.

From that moment, he took refuge in a magical universe, around objects and dolls created by him, gave birth to the last and delirious expressionist stage of his work figurative period characterized by the use of materials such as chalk, crayons and a theatrical fantasy that became more and more uncontrollable but, through a drawing that aspired to academic correctness, sought to restore the emotional balance of Reverón.

In 2007, the Museum of Modern Art in New York presented a retrospective of Reverón's figurative and landscape paintings, life-sized dolls, and other objects made for his home in Macuto. The exhibition was organized in cooperation with Venezuela's Fundación Museos Nacionales and Proyecto Armando Reverón.

== Selected works ==
- Maja at the Museum of Modern Art (c. 1933)
- Woman of the River at the Museum of Modern Art (1939)
- White Landscape at the Museum of Modern Art (1940)
