= Jesús Rafael Soto =

Venezuelan artist

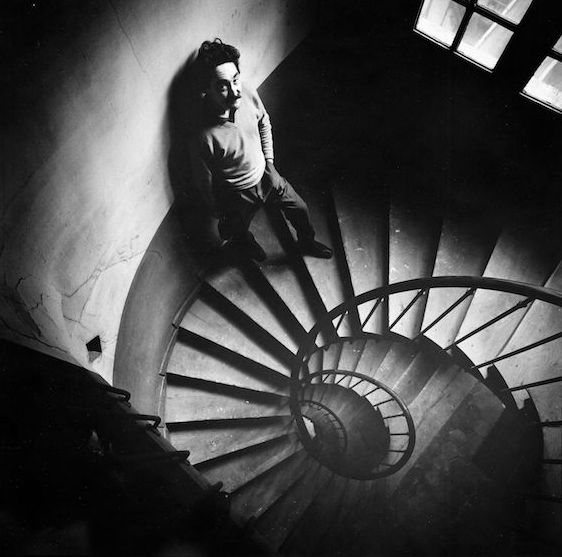
- Born: June 5, 1923; Ciudad Bolívar
- Died: January 14, 2005 (aged 81); Paris, France
- Education: Escuela de Artes Plasticas y Aplicadas
- Notable work: Penetrables
- Movement: Kinetic and Op Art

Jesús Rafael Soto (June 5, 1923 – January 14, 2005) was a Venezuelan kinetic and op artist, sculptor, and painter.

His works can be found in the collections of the main museums of the world, including Tate (London), Museum Ludwig (Germany), Centre Georges Pompidou (Paris), Galleria Nazionale d'Arte Moderna (Roma), and MoMA (New York). In his hometown, one of the main art museums in Venezuela, the Jesús Soto Museum of Modern Art, is named in his honor.

== Early life ==
Jesús Rafael Soto was born in Ciudad Bolívar, Venezuela. He was the eldest of four children born to Emma Soto and Luis Garcia Parra, a violin player. From a very young age, Soto wanted to help support his family in any way he could, and art was the most interesting to him. He picked up the guitar and also began recreating famous pieces of art that he found in various books, magazines, and almanacs.

At 16, Soto started his serious artistic career when he began to create and paint posters for the cinemas in Ciudad Bolívar. "At that age," says Soto, "the only artists that I knew were the lettering painters. My family was very happy. I could earn some money, make lettering till the end of my days. Nobody looked further than that..."

In 1938, Soto participated in a student group affiliated with surrealism ideas and published poems in the local journal that scandalized society. In the group, Soto learned about automatic writing and charcoal drawing, "I drew heads, portraits, I had a great technique. Finally, there were people who made a petition, the bishop asked to see it, and he signed it. I got a scholarship…"

== Education ==
In 1942, he received a scholarship to study artistic training at the Escuela de Artes Plásticas y Artes Aplicadas (Plastic and Applied Arts School) in Caracas, finishing his studies in 1947. Once there, he took classes in "pure art" and the "training course for instructors in art education history." The director of the school, Antonio Edmundo Monsanto, was instrumental to Soto’s career as he often brought inspirations from foreign countries to his students, including the latest from the avant-garde: cubism. Soto was also influenced by other very important Venezuelan artists, including Omar Carreño, Carlos Cruz-Diez, Narsico Deboug, Dora Hersen, Mateo Manaure, Luis Guevara, Pascual Navarro, Mercedes Pardo, and Alejandro Otero.

"When I got in the Fine Arts School," says Soto, "the first thing I saw was the reproduction of a dead nature of Braque". This image caused such impact on him because, "...the color started to separate off the form," and because of the multiplicity of the viewing points that he wanted to represent.

== Influences ==
After Soto had graduated from Escuela de Artes Plasticas y Artes Aplicadas, receiving a teaching degree, he was then hired to be the director of the Escuela de Bellas Artes de Maracaibo from 1947 to 1950. When he was teaching there, he received a government grant to travel to France, and settled in Paris.

In France, Soto discovered Paul Klee and Piet Mondrian's work, and the latter suggested the idea of 'dynamizing the neoplasticism'. This, joined with Soto's will to create a new sort of movement that would add to three-dimensional art, concluded in associations with Yaacov Agam, Jean Tinguely, Victor Vasarely, and other artists connected with the Salon des Réalités Nouvelles and the Galerie Denise René.

== Career ==
In the beginning, Soto painted post-impressionist works, later getting interested in Cubism. After getting in touch with Malevich, Mondrian, and the constructivists, Soto started to experiment with optical phenomena and op art. He then began to make art that was more than just pictures.

=== The first serial works ===
In the 1950s, Soto experimented with serial art: the repetition of formal elements in the plan, the depersonalization of the work, and the revelation of the relativity of the vision. He achieved the reproduction of vibratory phenomena and, above all, the rupture of notions like composition and equilibrium. Making the work of art a fragment of an infinite reality, which could be repeated without varying its essential structure. Without a beginning, an end, up, down, right, left. Helped by notions from the mathematics and music fields, Soto makes his serial art.

=== Incorporation of time and real movement ===
The next step in Soto's works was incorporating time and real movement through the treatment of the space. The work should be an autonomous object, where "real" situations were put into play, and not a plan where a determinate vision was projected. At the same time that the spectator was moving in front of the work of art, to obtain from it its optical vibrational effects, time and real movement were being incorporated. In his Dos cuadrados en el espacio (1953), Soto began a series retaking the approaches of Malevich, especially about adopting the square as the "only valid form".

In his Desplazamiento de un cuadro transparente (1953–54), he created a spatial effect on a plane surface that was later developed in a three-dimensional way, superimposing two or more Plexiglas sheets, transparent but painted with straight or curved drawings that changed the way they were seen as the spectator moved, inviting the participation of the public. Using superimposed Plexiglas surfaces, Soto developed optical effects that appeared to move as viewers changed position in front of the work.

In 1955, Soto participated in the exhibition Le Mouvement at Galerie Denise René in Paris. Other artists being shown were Yaacov Agam, Marcel Duchamp, and Victor Vasarely. The exhibition prompted the publication of the 'Yellow Manifest' about kinetic art and the visual research involving spectators and stimulus. The kinetic art movement gained force in Europe and Latin America after this exhibition.

=== Dematerialization of form ===
As a result of the optical vibratory states that Soto achieves from the superposition of plans, a new situation appears: the outbreak of the solid body, its dematerialization in our retina, phenomena that are produced for the first time in Permutación (1956). In Estructuras cinéticas de elementos geométricos (1955-57) and Armonía transformable (1956), a new element is added that was relegated in his research: color. It is about the superposition of different plexiglass planes, where color frames are inscribed, introducing new vibratory elements. The real division of the plane that had previously undergone an unfolding is produced here. Its structure already suggests a true spatial dimension, as a consequence of the equivalence of its obverse and its reverse. The situation becomes more complex, due to the multiplication of different lines, colors, and directions. Plexiglass, a medium that had provided the possibility of conforming aleatory states, begins to be an impediment, and the search for a new way of materializing vibration starts.

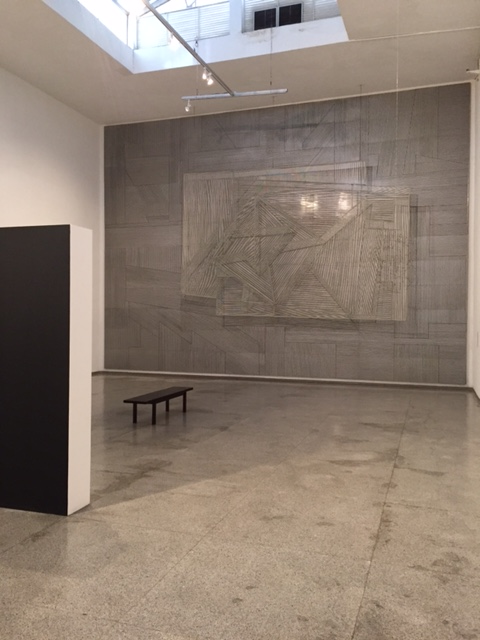
Brussels Mural, Jesús Soto (1958). Museo de Bellas Artes de Caracas.

=== The conformation of a new visual order ===
To the preoccupation of searching for a new way of materializing the vibratory states is added the concern to approach the human scale, integrating Soto's works into architecture. This is how, in Estructura Cinética (1957), the frames that had been drawn on plexiglass become real elements: metal rods welded between them. Soto's works become real special objects that visitors are able to penetrate.

In the 1950s and the beginning of the 1960s, starting from his basic concept of matter and space as different manifestations of energy, Soto had already structured the conceptual platform of his plastic language. Works like Escritura and Muro de Bruselas, both from 1958, already contain all the elements that will be developed later.

"My work of art," as Soto says, "is totally abstract. It was born from a reflection about painting and the propositions of our biggest (artists). I don't copy nature, I isolate fundamental properties of the reality. For me, works are, before all, signs, no matter. It would be wrong to see in the work that is in front of you the object of my art, it isn't there if not as a witness, sign of another thing..."

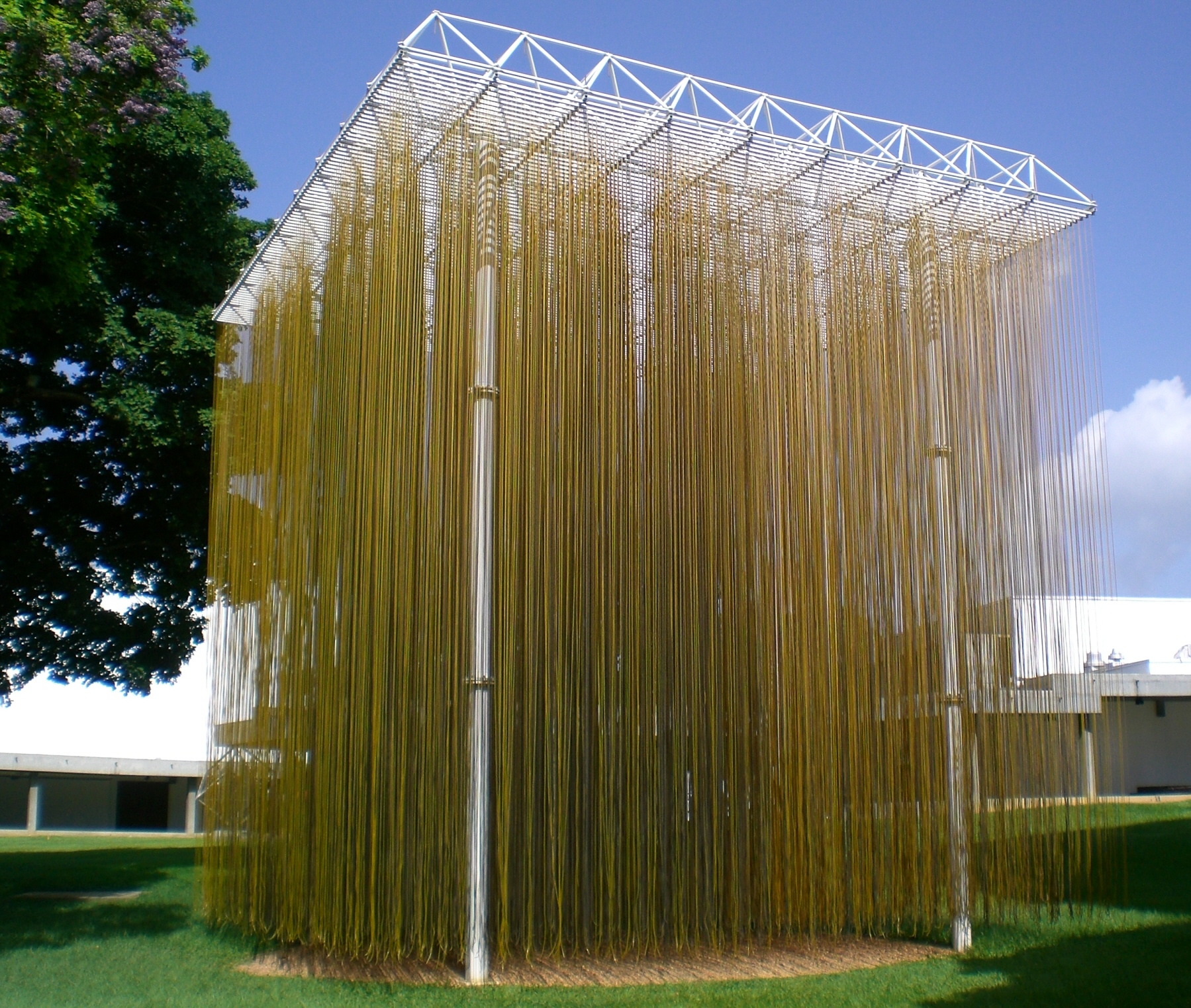
Penetrable amarillo. Museo Soto, Ciudad Bolivar.

=== Space plenitude ===
All of Soto's work, from start to end, answers to the same necessity of materializing his concept of the world as an impossible reality to measure on a human scale; a vision where energy and space are vital as essential situations inside nature. To reveal these situations in all of their complex dimensions was the impulse that has fed his plastic research.

"When you enter a penetrable, you have the sensation of being in a light swirl, a total plenitude of vibrations. The Penetrable is a kind of concretization of this plenitude in which I make people move and make them feel the body of space. Is a way of materializing what exist, is an immaterial state, one state that for me isn't irreal, but a reality. Reality exists all over the place and fill all the universe. Emptiness doesn't exist, anywhere. This is my basic line of thought."

== Contributions ==
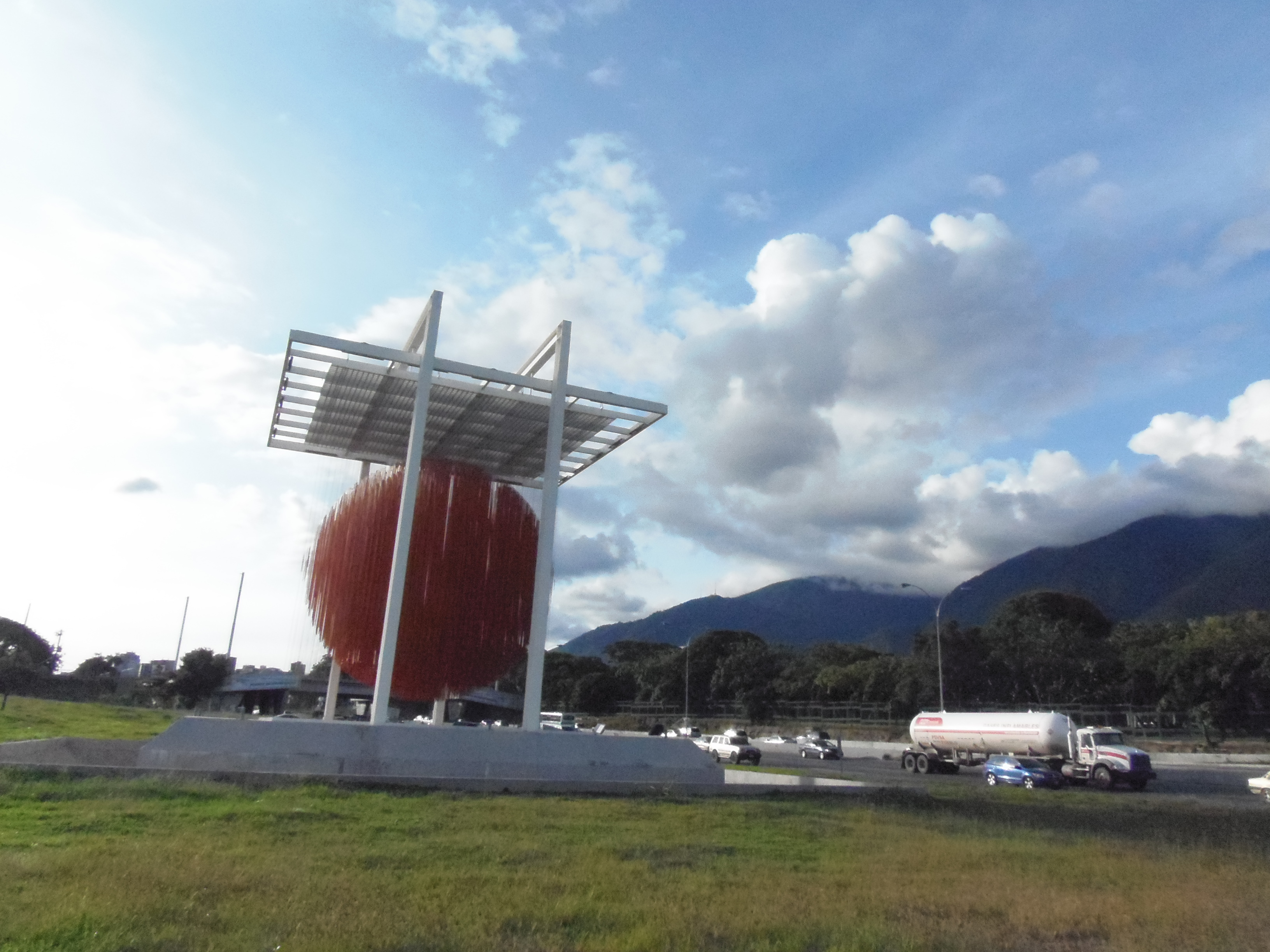
The Soto sphere in Caracas

'Soto would set the bases for an art that transcended the conventional parameters of painting and sculpture.' By inviting the spectator to participate in the work, instead of merely looking from a distance, Soto more deeply engages the audience and makes the experience more intriguing and stimulating. Soto had a partner in this movement. On the other hand, his counterpart, Carlos Cruz-Diez, focused more on the way colours are perceived by the eye. One of his series called Fisicromias (Physiochromies) shows how coloured light is perceived and displaced through one's eyes. Another artist who participated in this style was Alejandro Otero. His series Colortions (Rhythmicolors) combines the same concepts of the perception of colour in the eye and participants' movement with the work, but gives greater attention to how the colours are controlled with vertical lines.

Jesús Rafael Soto died in 2005 in Paris and is buried in the Cimetière du Montparnasse.

== Impact ==
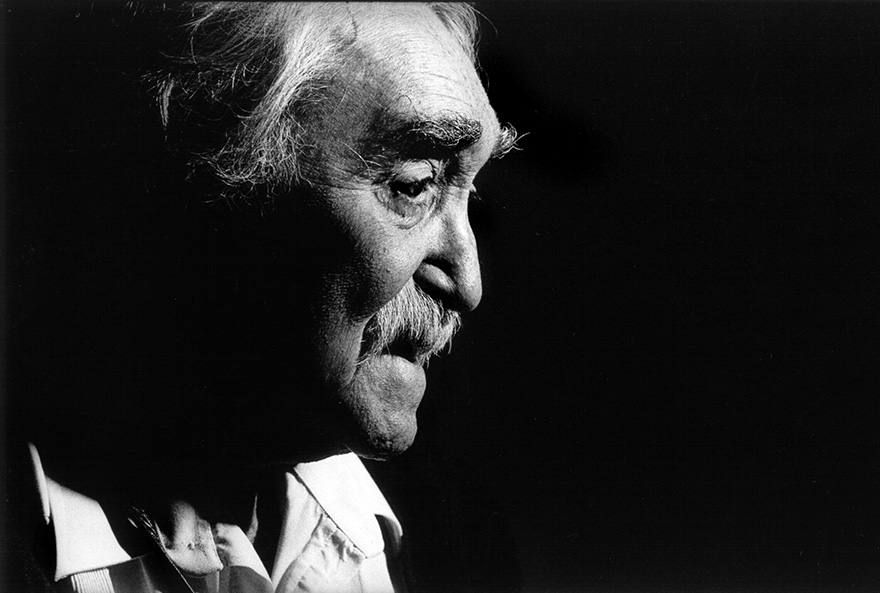

Like many other Venezuelan artists from this time, Jesus Rafael Soto and Carlos Cruz-Diez considered their works a response to what they felt the problems were in the art of their time. They wanted to express a more universal process of art. Because of this, their works are contributions that continue to enrich the art world. Their willingness to contribute and put themselves in a more universal approach to art was a direct rebuttal to the traditional views of art in Latin America. With Venezuela, this was a way for them to add what they felt was missing in the art of Latin America.

Painting, in history, was an act of responding to the situation at hand in the mind of Soto and Cruz-Diez. "Everything else was academic, anachronistic, or as Alejandro Otero said, 'the work of a man hiding behind time.'"

== Collections ==
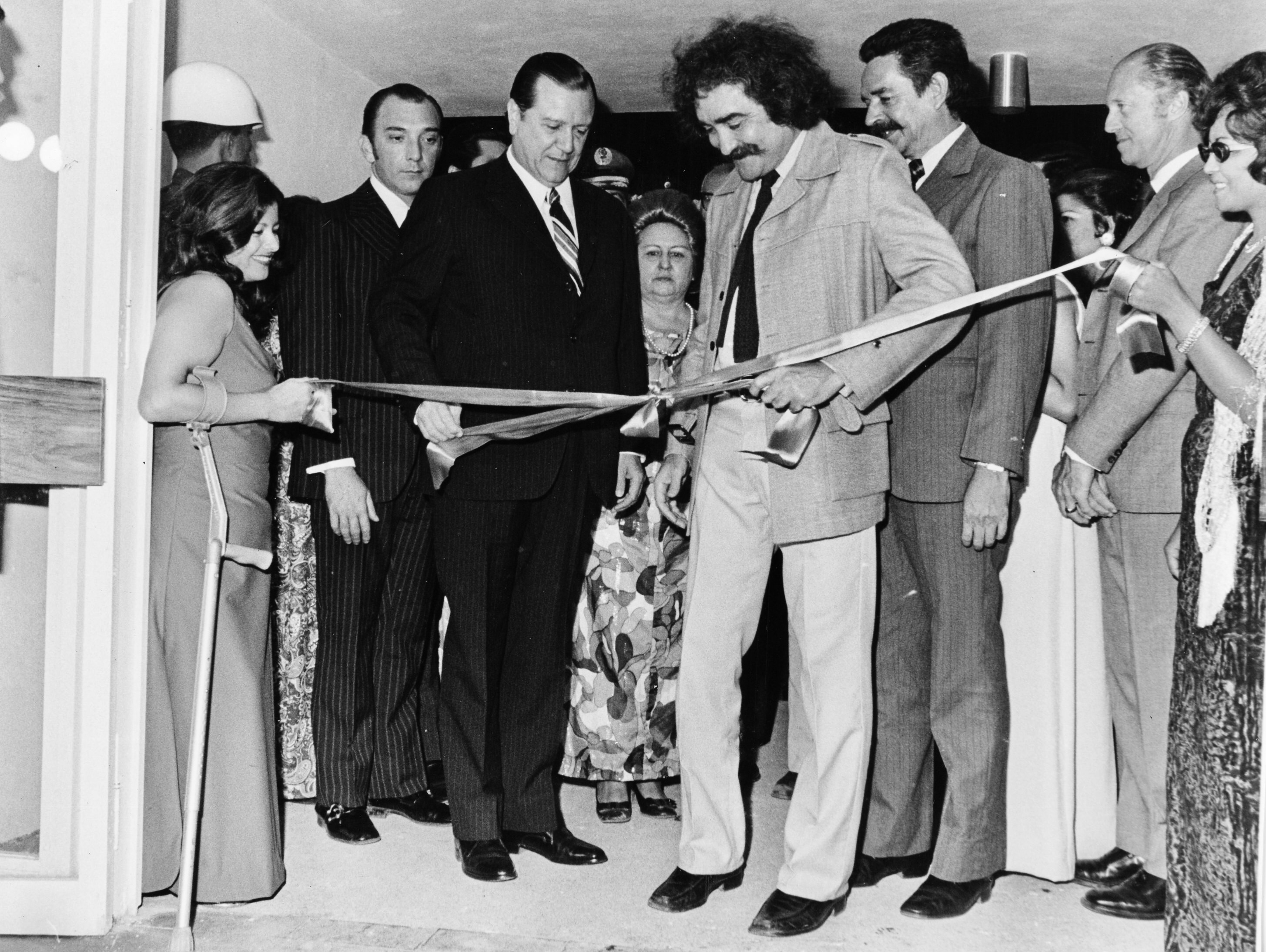
August 25, 1973. Inauguration of the Museo de Arte Moderno Jesús Soto in Ciudad Bolívar, Venezuela

In 1973, the Jesús Soto Museum of Modern Art opened in Ciudad Bolívar, Venezuela, with a collection of his work. Venezuelan architect Carlos Raúl Villanueva designed the building for the museum, and Italian op artist Getulio Alviani was called to run it. Something that is different about this gallery is that a large number of the exhibits are wired to the electricity supply so that they can move.

Argentina	Museo Nacional de Bellas Artes, Buenos Aires
Australia	National Gallery of Australia, Canberra
Australia	National Gallery of Victoria, Melbourne
Belgium	Royal Museums of Fine Arts of Belgium, Brussels
Belgium	Musée de Sculpture en Plein Air, Middelheim
Brazil	Museu de Arte Contemporânea da Universidade de São Paulo
Canada	Musée d'Art Contemporain de Montréal
Chile	Museo de la Solidaridad Salvador Allende, Santiago
Colombia	Museo de Arte Moderno La Tertulia, Cali
Cuba	Casa de las Américas, La Havana
Denmark	Louisiana, Humlebaek
Egypt	Universal Graphic Museum, Giza
Finland	The Museum of Contemporary Art, Helsinki
France	Le Musée Martiniquais des Arts des Amériques- M2A2, Le Lamentin (Martinique)
France	Musée d'Art Contemporain, Lyon
France	Musée des Beaux-Arts de Nantes
France	Musée d'Art Moderne de la Ville de Paris
France	Musée National d'Art Moderne, Centre Georges Pompidou, Paris
France	Fonds Départemental d'Art Contemporain, Val-de-Marne
France	Musée des Beaux-Arts, Pau
Germany	Josef Albers Museum, Quadrat, Bottrop
Germany	Museum Ludwig, Cologne
Germany	Sprengel Museum Hannover, Hanover
Germany	Kaiser Wilhelm Museum, Krefeld
Germany	Museum Wurth, Kunzelsau
Germany	Museum Morsbroich, Leverkusen
Germany	Sammlung Lenz Schönberg, Munich
Germany	Staatsgalerie, Stuttgart
Germany	Ulmer Museum, Ulm
Israel	The Israel Museum, Jerusalem
Israel	Tel Aviv Museum of Art, Tel Aviv
Italy	Fondazione Lucio Fontana, Milan
Italy	Galleria Nazionale d'Arte Moderna e Contemporanea di Roma
Italy	Fondazione Il Giardino di Daniel Spoerri, Seggiano (Grosseto)
Italy	Galleria Civica d'Arte Moderna e Contemporanea, Turin
Italy	Fondazione Calderara, Vacciago di Ameno
Japan	Fukuoka Art Museum
Japan	Museum of Modern Art, Hokkaido
Japan	Itami City Art Museum, Itami
Japan	The Iwaki City Museum, Iwaki
Japan	Museum of Modern Art, Saitama
Japan	Hara Museum of Contemporary Art, Tokyo
Japan	Museum of Modern Art, Wakayama
Mexico	Museo Rufino Tamayo, Mexico.
Nicaragua	Museo de Arte Latino Americano Contemporáneo de Managua
Netherlands	Mondriaanhuis, Amersfoort
Netherlands	Peter Stuyvesant Foundation, Amsterdam
Netherlands	Stedelijk Museum, Amsterdam
Netherlands	Rijksmuseum Kröller-Müller, Otterlo
Netherlands	Museum Boymans-van Beuningen, Rotterdam
New Zealand	Auckland City Art Gallery, Auckland
Roumania	Muezul de Arta Universala Burcuresti, Bucarest
South Korea	Ho-Am Art Museum, Seoul
South Korea	National Museum of Contemporary Art, Seoul
South Korea	Tongyoung Nammang Open Air Sculpture Park, Tongyoung City
Spain	Museo Luis González Robles, Universidad de Alcalá, Alcalá de Henares
Spain	Museo de La Asegurada, Alicante
Spain	Museo Nacional Centro de Arte Reina Sofía, Madrid
Spain	Fundación ARCO, Madrid
Spain	Centro Atlántico de Arte Moderno, Las Palmas, Grande Canarie
Spain	Fundación César Manrique, Teguise, Lanzarote (Canary Islands)
Sweden	Malmö Konstmuseum, Malmö
Sweden	Moderna Museet, Stockholm
Switzerland	Museum für Gegenwartskunst, Basel
Switzerland	Kunstmuseum, Berne
United Kingdom	Tate Gallery, London
U.S.A.	Norton Museum of Art, West Palm Beach, Florida
U.S.A.	Albright-Knox Art Gallery, Buffalo (New York)
U.S.A.	Neuberger Museum of Art, Purchase (New York)
U.S.A.	The Museum of Modern Art, New York
U.S.A.	Solomon R. Guggenheim Museum, New York
U.S.A.	Oklahoma City Art Museum, Oklahoma City, (Oklahoma)
U.S.A.	Archer M. Huntington Art Gallery, Austin, (Texas)
U.S.A.	Hirshhorn Museum and Sculpture Garden, Washington D.C.
Venezuela	Fundación Galería de Arte Nacional, Caracas
Venezuela	Museo de Arte Contemporáneo de Caracas Sofía Imber, Caracas
Venezuela	Museo de Bellas Artes, Caracas
Venezuela	Museo de Arte Moderno - Fundación Jesús Soto, Ciudad Bolívar
Venezuela	Museo de Arte Moderno de Mérida Juan Astorga Anta, Mérida

== Environmental integrations ==
- 1957: "Structure cinétique", Ciudad Universitaria, Caracas, Venezuela
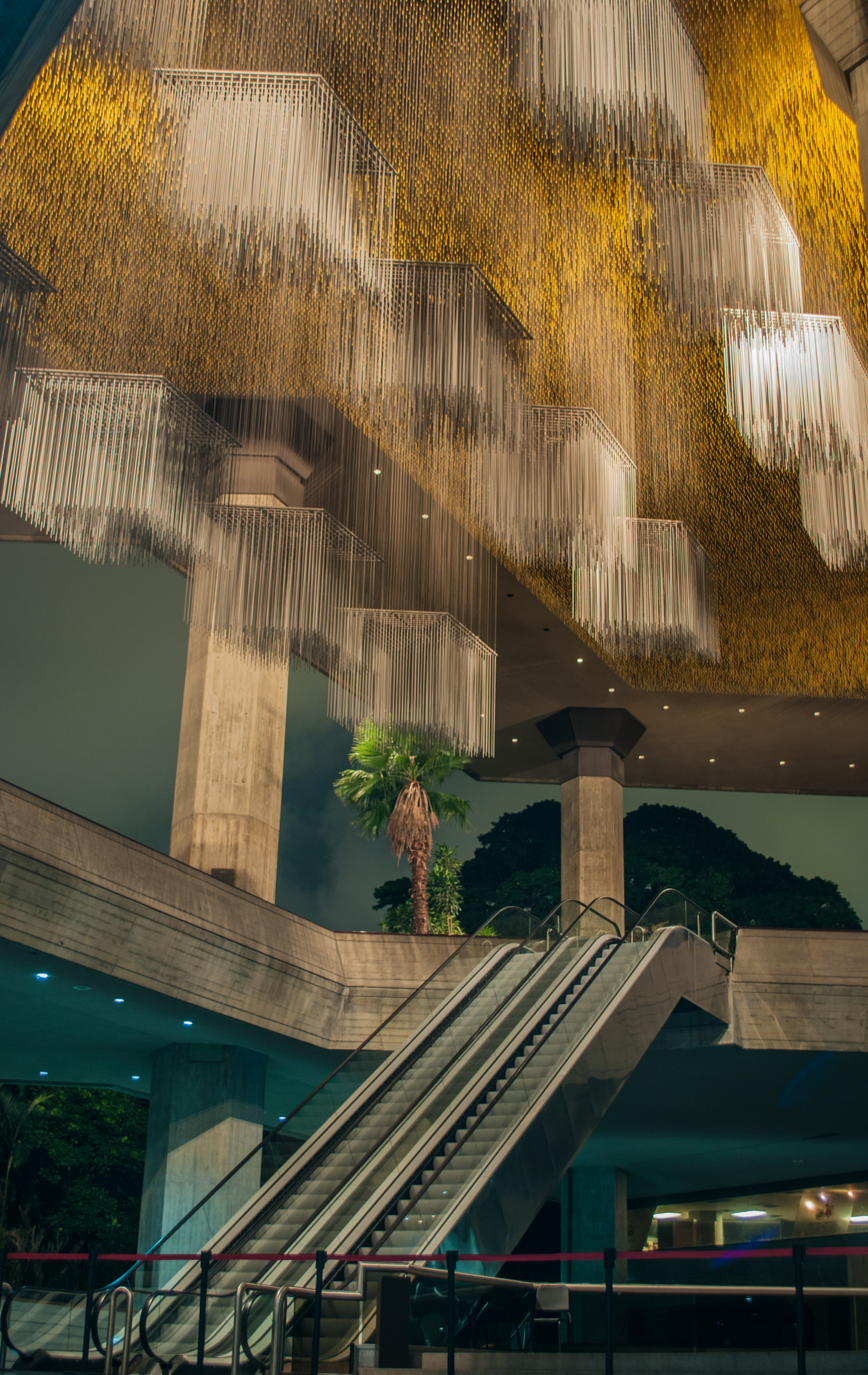
  Teresa Carreño Cultural Complex
- 1958: "Wall of Brussels", I.V.I.C., Caracas, Venezuela (made for Universal Exhibition of Brussels, 1958). "Tour de Bruxelles", I.V.I.C., Caracas, Venezuela (made for Universal Exhibition of Brussels, 1958).
- 1967: "Volume suspendu", Expo 67, Pavililon of Venezuela, Montreal, Canada (ephemeral environment in the pavilion made by architect Carlos Raúl Villanueva for intégration of Soto's monumental artwork, Universal Exhibition in Montréal, 1967).
- 1968-69: '' Ephemeral Environment'' made for the end year festivities, Place Furstenberg, Paris, France.
- 1969: "Mur cinétique" (2), UNESCO, Paris, France. "Progresión a centro móvil", Torre Capriles, Caracas, Venezuela. "Paralelas vibrantes", Torre Capriles, Caracas, Venezuela. "Volumen cinético", Torre Capriles, Caracas, Venezuela.
- 1970: Hall, Deutsche Bundesbank, Francfort, Germany. "Extension et progression dans l'eau", Rethel college, The Ardennes, France. Hall, Faculté de Médecine et de Pharmacie, Rennes, France.
- 1971: "Vibración amarilla", I.V.I.C., Caracas, Venezuela.
- 1972: Hall, pharmaceutical Laboratory Sandoz, Basle, Switzerland.
- 1972-82: Complejo Cultural Teresa Carreño, Caracas, Venezuela.
- 1973: "El gran mural de las escrituras", Banco Central de Venezuela, Caracas, Venezuela. "Extension et progression dans l'eau", Paseo Ciencias, Maracaibo, Venezuela.
- 1973-95: "Penetrable", Parque García Sanabría, Santa Cruz de Tenerife, Spain.
- 1974: "Mur cinétique", International duOffice for Work, Geneva, Switzerland.
- 1975: Hall and restaurant of the personnel, Régie Renault, Boulogne- Billancourt, France. "Progression", CES (college), Moreuil, France.
- 1977: " Suspended Virtual Volume", Royal Bank of Canada, Toronto, Canada. "Mural Cavendes", Edificio Cavendes, Caracas, Venezuela.
- 1979: "Environnement", Reception, Cars-Motors, Caracas, Venezuela. "Gran escritura negra", Banco de Venezuela, Caracas, Venezuela. "Volumen virtual suspendido", Centro Banaven, Caracas, Venezuela. "Interférences vibrantes", West Deutsche Landesbank, Dortmund, Germany.
- 1982: "Progresión suspendida amarilla y blanca", Entidad de Ahorro y Préstamo, Puerto La Cruz, Venezuela.
- 1983: "Progresión amarilla", Metro Chacaíto, Caracas, Venezuela. "Cubo virtual azul y negro", Metro Chacaíto, Caracas, Venezuela.
- 1984: "Extensión azul y blanca", Seguros La Seguridad, Caracas, Venezuela. "Volumen virtual polícromo", Deutsche Eisenbahn Versicherung, Cologne, Germany.
- 1985: "Esfera Japón", Edificio Banco Lara, Caracas, Venezuela.
- 1987: " Cubo Meneven", Edificio Corpoven, Puerto La Cruz, Venezuela.
- 1988: "Ovoide Polar", Fundación Polar, Caracas, Venezuela. "Cubo Provincial", Banco Provincial, Caracas, Venezuela. " Mur Polychrome", CFDT, Paris, France. " Ecriture", CFDT, Paris, France. " Large Sphere of Seoul", Olympic Park, Seoul, South Korea (made for Olympiade of Arts during Olympic Games in Seoul, 1988). "Media esfera roja", Seguros La Seguridad, Caracas, Venezuela. "Cubo virtual", Torre Banco Provincial, Caracas, Venezuela.
- 1992: "'Media esfera azul y Verde", Seville, Spain (made for Universal Exhibition in Seville, 1992).
- 1993: "Dos cubos virtuales", Darier Hentsch & Cie., Geneva, Switzerland.
- 1993-94: "Cubo de Francia", Ambassade de France, Caracas, Venezuela.
- 1995: "Welcoming Flag", Dowa Fire & Marine Insurance Company Phoenix Tower, Osaka, Japan.
- 1989-1995: " Volume virtual Air France", Air France Head Office, Roissy, France.
- 1997: Integration of four artworks, Hall, KPMG, La Défense (Paris), France. "Cube noir Penetrable", Fondazione Il Giardino di Daniel Spoerri, Seggiano (Grosseto), Italy. "Sphère bleue", Samsung Plaza, Gare de Suhyun (Megaport of Bundang), South Korea. " Penetrable of Tongyoung", Tongyoung Nammang Open Air Sculpture Park, Korea (1997). " Virtual Ellipsoids", Dresdner Bank Head Office, Berlin, Germany. "Esfera de Caracas", motorway Francisco Fajardo, Caracas, Venezuela.
- 1998-99: "La esfera de Margarita", Porlamar, Margarita Island, Venezuela.
- 2001: "' Large oval", new Chinese Petroleum Corporation Head Office, Taipei, Taiwan.

== Individual exhibitions ==
1949	Taller Libre de Arte, Caracas, Venezuela.
1956	Galerie Denise René, Paris, France.
1957	Galerie Aujourd'hui, Palais des Beaux-Arts, Brussels, Belgium.
1957	Museo de Bellas Artes, Caracas, Venezuela.
1959	Galerie Iris Clert, Paris, France.
1959	Galleri Vallingatan, Stockholm, Sweden.
1961	Galerie Rudolf Zwirner, Essen; Galerie Brusberg, Hanover, Germany.
1961	Museo de Bellas Artes, Caracas, Venezuela.
1962	Galerie Ad Libitum, Antwerp, Belgium.
1962	Galerie Edouard Loeb, Paris, France.
1963	Museum Haus Lange, Krefeld, Germany.
1964	Galerie Müller, Stuttgart, Germany.
1964	Museo de Bellas Artes, Caracas, Venezuela.
1965	Kootz Gallery, New York, U.S.A.
1965	Galerie Edouard Loeb, Paris, France.
1965	Signals Gallery, London, United Kingdom.
1966	Galerie Schmela, Düsseldorf; Pfalzgalerie des Bezirksverbandes, Kaiserslautern, Germany.
1966	Galleria del Naviglio, Milan, Italy.
1966	Kootz Gallery, New York, U.S.A.
1966	Galleria del Cavallino, Venice, Italy.
1966	Centro Arte Viva-Feltrinelli, Trieste, Italy.
1967	Galerie Denise René, Paris, France.
1967	Museo de Bellas Artes, Caracas, Venezuela.
1968	Galerie Françoise Mayer, Brussels, Belgium.
1968	Kunsthalle, Bern, Switzerland; Kunstverein für die Rheinlande und Westfalen, Düsseldorf, Germany; Stedelijk Museum, Amsterdam, Netherlands (1969); Palais des Beaux-Arts, Brussels, Belgium (1969); Musée d'Art Moderne de la Ville de Paris, France (1969).
1968	Marlborough Galleria d'Arte, Rome, Italy.
1968	Galleria Lorenzelli, Bergame, Italy.
1969	Galleria Notizie, Turin, Italy.
1969	Galleria del Naviglio, Milan, Italy.
1969	Galleria Flori, Firenze, Italy.
1969	Galleria Giraldi, Livourne, Italy.
1969	Estudio Actual, Caracas, Venezuela.
1969	Svensk-Franska Konstgalleriet, Stockholm, Sweden; Galerie Bonnier, Geneva, Switzerland (1970).
1969	Marlborough-Gerson Gallery, New York, U.S.A.
1969	Théâtre du Huitième, Lyon, France.
1970	Galleria de la Nova Loggia, Bologna, Italy.
1970	Galerie Godard Lefort, Montreal, Canada.
1970	Kunstverein, Mannheim; Pfalzgalerie des Bezirksverbandes, Kaiserslautern; Ulmer Museum, Ulm, Germany.
1970	Galerie Semiha Huber, Zürich, Switzerland.
1970	Galerie Denise René, Paris, France.
1970	Galerija Suvremene Umjetnosti, Zagreb, Yugoslavia.
1970	Galerie Buchholz, Munich, Germany.
1971	Museum of Contemporary Art, Chicago; Akron Art Center, Ohio, U.S.A.
1971	Galerie Denise René/Hans Mayer, Düsseldorf, Germany.
1971	Galleria Rotta, Milan, Italy.
1971	Museo de Bellas Artes, Caracas, Venezuela; Museo de Arte Moderno, Bogotá, Colombia (1972).
1971	Kunstverein, Kaiserslautern, Germany.
1971	Ariete Graphica, Milan, Italy.
1971	Galería de Arte, INCIBA, Palacio de las Industrias, Caracas, Venezuela (1971-1972).
1972	Estudio Actual, Caracas, Venezuela.
1972	Galerie Beyeler, Basle; Galerie Alice Pauli, Lausanne, Switzerland.
1972	Galleria Levi, Milan, Italy.
1972	Formes et Muraux, Lyon, France.
1972	Marlborough Godard, Toronto, Canada.
1973	Estudio Dos, Valencia, Venezuela.
	Universidad Central de Venezuela, Caracas, Venezuela.
	Galleria Corsini, Intra (Lake Maggiore), Italy.
	Galleria Godel, Rome, Italy.
	Galería Arte Contacto, Caracas, Venezuela.
1974	Solomon R. Guggenheim Museum, New York, U.S.A.; Musée Boymans-van Beuningen, Rotterdam, Pays-Bas (1975); Hirshhorn Museum and Sculpture Garden, Washington D.C., U.S.A. (1975).
1974	Galerie Denise René, New York, U.S.A.
1975	Galería Arte Contacto, Caracas, Venezuela.
1976	Galerie Watari, Tokyo, Japan.
1977	Galerie Bonnier, Geneva, Switzerland.
1977	Centre International de Création Artistique, Sénanque, France.
1977	Galería El Parque, Valencia, Venezuela.
1977	Galería Arte Contacto, Caracas, Venezuela.
1977	Bibliothèque Municipale, Caen, France.
1977	Galerie Valeur, Nagoya, Japan.
1978	Louisiana Museum, Humlebaek, Denmark.
1978	Liljevalchs Konsthall, Stockholm, Sweden.
1979	Helsinki Kaupungin Taidekokoelmat, Helsinki, Finland.
1979	Musée National d'Art Moderne, Centre Georges Pompidou, Paris, France.
1980	Galerie Denise René, Paris, France.
1980	Museo de Arte Contemporáneo de Caracas, Sala Ipostel, Caracas, Venezuela.
1980	Universidad Simón Bolívar, Caracas, Venezuela.
1980	Galerie Ferm, Malmö, Sweden.
1981	Galería de Arte Rolando Oliver Rugeles, Mérida, Venezuela.
1981	Museo de Arte Contemporáneo Francisco Narváez, Porlamar, Venezuela.
1981	Galería Témpora, Bogotá, Colombia.
1981	Casa de Colón, Las Palmas, Grande Canarie, Spain.
1982	Palacio de Velázquez, Madrid, Spain.
1982	Caja de Ahorros Provincial, Alicante, Spain.
1982	Fundación Joan Miró, Barcelone, Spain.
1982	Colegio de Arquitectos, Santa Cruz de Tenerife, Spain.
1982	Galería Theo & Sala Celini, Madrid, Spain.
1982	Galería Quintero, Barranquilla, Colombia.
1982	Ateneo, Zea, Venezuela.
1983	Casa de la Cultura, La Victoria, Venezuela.
1983	Museo de Arte Contemporáneo de Caracas, Venezuela.
1983	Centro de Bellas Artes, Maracaibo, Venezuela.
1983	Sala Luzán, Saragossa, Spain.
1984	Charles Cowles Gallery, New York, U.S.A.
1985	Galería Garcés Velásquez, Bogotá, Colombia.
1985	Achenbach Art Consulting, Düsseldorf, Germany.
1985	Center for the Fine Arts, Miami, U.S.A.
1985	Hokin Gallery, Miami, U.S.A.
1986	Contemporary Sculpture Center, Tokyo; Contemporary Sculpture Center, Osaka, Japan.
1986	Expressions Art Gallery, Coconut Grove (Florida), U.S.A.
1987	Galerie Gilbert Brownstone, Paris, France.
1988	Ateneo, Boconó, Venezuela.
1988	Elisabeth Franck Gallery, Knokke-le-Zoute, Belgium.
1988	Instituto de Cultura Puertorriqueña, San Juan, Porto Rico.
1988	Hyundai Gallery, Seoul, South Korea.
1989	Galerie Hermanns, Munich, Germany.
1989	Museo de Arte, Coro, Venezuela.
1990	Galería Theo, Madrid, Spain.
1990	Theospacio, Madrid, Spain.
1990	Estudio Theo, Madrid, Spain.
1990	Galerie Sapone, Nice, France.
1990	Galleria Eva Menzio, Turin, Italy.
1990	Museum of Modern Art, Kamakura; Museum of Modern Art, Saitama; Iwaki City Art Museum, Iwaki; Itami City Museum of Art, Itami, Japan.
1990	Galería Theo, Barcelona, Spain.
1990	Galleria Art Valley 88, Forte dei Marmi, Italy.
1990	Josef Albers Museum, Quadrat, Bottrop, Germany.
1991	Gallery 44, Kaarst, Germany.
1991	Gallery 44, FIAC, Paris, France.
1991	Humphrey Gallery, New York, U.S.A.
1991	Galleria Arte 92, Milan, Italy.
1991	Galería Quintero, Barranquilla, Colombia.
1992	Galería Theo, ARCO, Madrid, Spain.
1992	Abbaye Saint-André, Centre d'Art Contemporain, Meymac; Le Carré/Musée Bonnat, Bayonne; Musée des Beaux-Arts, Pau, France (1993); Fundação de Serralves, Porto, Portugal (1993).
1992	Altamira Fine Art, Caracas, Venezuela.
1992	Museo de Bellas Artes, Caracas; Museo de Arte Moderno - Fundación Jesús Soto, Ciudad Bolívar, Venezuela (1993).
1993	Altamira Fine Art, ART ASIA, Hong Kong.
1993	Museo de Arte Contemporáneo de Maracay Mario Abreu, Maracay, Venezuela.
1994	Elisabeth Franck Gallery, Knokke-le-Zoute, Belgium.
1994	Casa de la Cultura Juan Félix Sánchez, Mérida; Ateneo Jesús Soto, Tovar, Venezuela.
1994	Festival International de Biarritz, France.
1994	Gallery Seomi, Seoul, South Korea.
1994	In Khan Gallery, New York, U.S.A.
1995	Durban-Segnini Gallery, ART MIAMI '95, Miami, U.S.A.
1995	Galería Exedra, Quito, Ecuador.
1995	Galería Durban, FIA, Caracas, Venezuela.
1995	"Espacio Soto", Galería Durban, Caracas, Venezuela.
1995	Hyundai Gallery, Seoul, South Korea.
1997	Galerie nationale du Jeu de Paume, Paris, France; Stiftung für Konkrete Kunst, Reutlingen, Germany; Museu de Arte Contempôranea da Universidade de São Paulo, Brazil.
1997	Galerie Denise René, Paris, France.
1997	Gallery Hyundai, Seoul, South Korea.
1997	Galerie Denise René, ART 28'97, Basle, Switzerland.
1997	Galería Durban, Caracas, Venezuela.
1997	Fairmate Art Gallery, Taipei, Taiwan.
1997	J.G.M. Galerie, FIAC, Paris, France.
1997	National Central University, Chung-Li, Taiwan.
1998	Museu de Arte Moderna da Bahia, Salvador (Bahia), Brazil.
1998	Riva Yares Gallery, Scottsdale (Arizona), U.S.A.
1998	Museo Nacional de Artes Visuales, Montevideo, Uruguay.
1998	Espacio Cultural PDV, Caracas, Venezuela.
1998	Centro Cultural del Conde Duque, Madrid, Spain.
1998	Riva Yares Gallery, Santa Fe (Nouveau Mexique), U.S.A.
1998	Museo Nacional de Bellas Artes, Buenos Aires, Argentina.
1998	Casa Andrade Muricy, Curitiba (Paraná), Brazil.
1998	Durban Segnini Gallery, Coral Gables (Florida), U.S.A.
1999	Banque Bruxelles Lambert, Brussels, Belgium.
1999	Galerie Schoeller, Düsseldorf, Germany.
1999	Sala de Arte Telefónica, Santiago, Chile.
1999	Galería de arte La Previsora, Caracas, Venezuela.
1999	Galerie am Lindenplatz AG, Vaduz, Liechtenstein.
1999	Galería de Arte Ascaso, Valencia, Venezuela.
2000	Kaohsiung Museum of Fine Arts, Kaohsiung, Taiwan.
2000	Museo de Arte Contemporáneo de Monterrey, Mexico.
2000	Allianz Versicherungs-AG, Berlin, Germany.
2000	Fundación Corp Group Centro Cultural, Caracas, Venezuela.
2000	Galerie Denise René, FIAC, Paris, France.
2001	Riva Yares Gallery, Scottsdale (Arizona), U.S.A.
2001	Museo de Arte Moderno de Bogotá, Colombia.
2001	Riva Yares Gallery, Santa Fe (Arizona), U.S.A.
2001	Fondation Veranneman, Kruishoutem, Belgium.
2002	Joan Guaita Art, Palma de Majorque, (Baleareic Islands), Spain.
2002	Dan Galeria, São Paulo, Brazil.
2002	Centro de Arte de Maracaibo Lía Bermúdez, Maracaibo, Venezuela.
2002	Galería de Arte Ascaso, Caracas, Venezuela.
2003	Museo de Arte Contemporáneo de Caracas, Venezuela.
2003	Centro Cultural Metropolitano, Quito, Ecuador.
2003	Galerie Denise René, Paris, France.
2004	Galería Dimaca, Caracas, Venezuela.
2004	Joan Guaita Art, Palma de Majorque, (Baleareic Islands), Spain.
2004	Galerie Denise René, Paris. France.
2004	Sicardi Gallery, Houston (Texas), U.S.A.
2005	Riva Yares Gallery, Scottsdale (Arizona), U.S.A.
2005	Centro Cultural Banco do Brasil, Rio de Janeiro, Brazil.
2005	Instituto Tomie Ohtake, São Paulo, Brazil.
2005	Museu Oscar Niemeyer, Curitiba (Paraná), Brazil.
2005	Artespacio, Santiago, Chile.
2005	Museo Tamayo Arte Contemporáneo, Mexico, Mexico.
2005	MoLAA Museum of Latin American Art, Long Beach (California), U.S.A.
2005	Galería de Arte Nacional, Caracas, Venezuela.
2005	Museo de Arte Coro, Coro, Estado Falcón, Venezuela.
2006	Instituto de Estudios Superiores de Administración IESA, Caracas, Venezuela.
2006	Centro de Arte la Estancia, Caracas, Venezuela.
2006	Trasnocho Cultural, Caracas, Venezuela.
2006	Fundación Proa, Buenos Aires, Argentina.
2006	GAMEC, Galleria d'Arte Moderna e Contemporaneo, Bergamo, Italy.
2006	Pablo Goebel Fines Arts, Ciudad de Mexico, Mexico.
2006	Galeria Theo Spacio, Madrid, Spain.
2008	Galería Elvira Gonzalez, Madrid, Spain.
2008	Leon Tovar Gallery, « Now on view », New York, U.S.A.
2008	Robert Sandelson and Contemporary International Art, Londres, United Kingdom.
2009	Galerie Max Hetzler, “Jesús Rafael Soto”, Berlin, Germany.
2010	Galerie Denise René espace marais et rive gauche, “Les harmonies combinatoires”, Paris, France.
2011	Haunch of Venison Gallery, “Jesús Rafael Soto”, New York, U.S.A.
2012	NYU Grey Art Gallery, "Soto: Paris and beyond", New York, U.S.A.
2012	Galeria Cayon, "Soto: negro sobre blanco - blanco sobre negro", Madrid, Spain.
2012	Galería de arte Ascaso, " Soto : Color sobre color ", Caracas, Venezuela.
2012	Musée de l’Hospice Saint-Roch, " Pénétrable BBL bleu ", Issoudun, France.
2012	Bosi contemporary gallery, " Soto unearthed : a 1968 film and selected early work ", New York, U.S.A.
2013	Galerie Denise René, Rive gauche, “ Soto”, Paris, France.
2013	Centre Pompidou, Mnam, " Soto – dans la collection du Musée National d’Art Moderne ", Paris, France.
2013	Stand galería Cayón, " ARCO ", Madrid, Spain.
2014	MFA Houston, “Soto, The Houston pénétrable”, Houston, U.S.A.
2014	Art institute of Chicago, “Jesús Rafael Soto : Pénétrable de Chicago”, Chicago, U.S.A.
2015	Galerie Perrotin, “Soto : Chronochrome”, New York, U.S.A.
2015	Galerie Perrotin, “Soto : Chronochrome”, Paris, France.
2015	Ascaso Gallery, “Soto Estático Dinámico”, Caracas, Venezuela.
2015	Musée Soulages, “Soto – Une rétrospective”, Rodez, France.
2016	Galería Cayón, " Jesús Soto – Virtual Soto ", Madrid, Spain.
2017	León Tovar Gallery, « Jesús Rafael Soto. Dans son jus”, New York, U.S.A.
2017	Université catholique de Lyon, “Pénétrable de Lyon”, Lyon, France.
2017	Cecilia Brunson Projects, “Jesús Rafael Soto : Sound Mural ”, London, United Kingdom.
2018	Galería Odalys, “ Soto ”, Madrid, Spain.
2018	Galería Cayón, “ Soto Múltiple ”, Madrid, Spain.
2018	Espace Louis Vuitton Tokyo, “Jesus Rafael Soto - Penetrable BBL Bleu. Selected works from the collection”, Tokyo, Japan.
2019	Hauser & Wirth Gallery, “ Soto Vibrations, 1950-1960 ”, New York, U.S.A.

== Prizes ==
1957	"Premio de Pintura Abstracta", Galería Don Hatch, Caracas, Venezuela.
1960	"Premio Nacional de Pintura", Venezuela..
1963	"Premio de la 2a Bienal Reverón", Caracas, Venezuela. "Premio Wolf", Bienal de São Paulo, Brésil.
1964	"David E. Bright Foundation Award", XXXII Biennale Internazionale d'Arte di Venezia, Italie. "Premio Gobierno de Córdoba al Autor de la Mejor Obra Extranjera", II Bienal Americana de Arte, Córdoba, Argentine. "Premio de la Ciudad de Córdoba", Argentine.
1965	"Primer Premio del Primer Salón Panamericano de Pintura", V Festival Nacional de Arte, Cali, Colombie.
1967	"Medaglia d'Oro del XVIe Convegno Internazionale Artisti, Critici e Studiosi d'Arte", Rimini, Italie. Remise des clés de la ville de Ciudad Bolívar, Venezuela.
1968	"Chevalier de l'Ordre des Arts et des Lettres", France.
1969	"3e Prix du Festival International de la Peinture", Cagnes-sur-Mer, France.
1970	"Premio Apollonio, 1a Bienal del Grabado Latinoamericano", San Juan, Porto Rico.
1972	"Orden Andrés Bello en Primer Grado", Caracas, Venezuela.
1978	"Doctor Honoris Causa de la Universidad de Oriente", Venezuela. "Orden Mérito al Trabajo en Primer Grado", Caracas, Venezuela.
1979	"Conseiller d'Honneur Vitalice", Association Internationale des Arts Plastiques (UNESCO), Paris, France.
1980	"Intergraphik Preis 1980", Berlin, Allemagne.
1981	"Prix d'Achat, 14e Biennale d'Art Graphique", Ljubljana, Slovénie. "Médaille Picasso", UNESCO, Paris, France.
1982	"Gold Medal", 6. Norsk Internasjonal Grafikk Biennale, Fredrikstad, Norvège.
1983	"Prix d'Achat", 15e Biennale Internationale de Gravure, Ljubljana, Slovénie. "Orden Francisco de Miranda en 1er Grado", Venezuela.
1984	"Premio Nacional de Artes Plásticas", Consejo Nacional de la Cultura (CONAC), Venezuela. "Miembro Honorario", Sociedad Bolivariana de Arquitectos, Caracas, Venezuela. "Profesor Honorario del Instituto Pedagógico de Caracas", Venezuela.
1985	"Orden Nacional Miguel Antonio Caro-Rufino José Cuervo", Bogotá, Colombie.
1986	"Membre Titulaire", Académie Européenne des Sciences, des Arts et des Lettres, Paris. "Orden Municipalidad del Distrito Sucre", Consejo Municipal del Distrito Sucre, Caracas, Venezuela.
1988	"Orden Samán de Aragua", Gobernación del Estado Aragua, Aragua, Venezuela. "Medalla Círculo de las Fuerzas Armadas", Caracas, Venezuela.
1989	"Orden Doctor Tulio Febres Cordero Primera Clase", Asamblea Legislativa del Estado de Mérida, Mérida, Venezuela. "Medalla de Honor", Instituto Venezolano de Investigaciones Científicas (IVIC), Caracas, Venezuela. "Médaille d'Argent des Arts Plastiques", Académie d'Architecture, Paris, France.
1990	"Médaille Picasso" (Vermeil), UNESCO, Paris, France. "Doctor Honoris Causa en Arquitectura", Universidad de Los Andes, Mérida, Venezuela. "Visitante Ilustre", San Fernando, Venezuela. "Orden Antonio José de Sucre en su Primera Clase", Cumaná, Venezuela. "Orden Ciudad de Mérida Primera Clase", Consejo del Municipio Libertador, Mérida, Venezuela. "Santiago de los Caballeros de Mérida", Mérida, Venezuela. "Medalla Universidad de Los Andes", Mérida, Venezuela.
1991	"Mitglieder der Akademie der Künste", Berlin, Allemagne. "Diploma", Consejo Cultural Mundial, Canberra, Australie.
1993	"Commandeur de l'Ordre des Arts et des Lettres", France. "Orden General de División Francisco Esteban Gómez (Clase Oro)", Nueva Esparta, Venezuela. Remise des clés de la ville de Maracay, Venezuela.
1994	"Doctor Honoris Causa", Universidad Nacional Experimental de Guayana, Ciudad Bolívar, Venezuela. "Hijo ilustre de la Bienal de la Ciudad de Cuenca", Equateur. "Amigo de Venezuela", Fundación Venezuela Positiva, Caracas, Venezuela.
1995	"Premio Distrital de Artes Plásticas 'Pedro Angel González'", Caracas, Venezuela. "Grand Prix National de la Sculpture", France. "Miembro Honorario de la Casa de la Cultura Ecuatoriana Benjamín Carrión", Quito, Equateur.
1996	"Miembro Honorario de la Fundación Orquesta Filarmónica Nacional", Caracas, Venezuela. "Orden Congreso de Angostura en grado de Gran Collar", Ciudad Bolívar, Venezuela. "Orden del Libertador en grado de Gran Cordón", Venezuela.
1999	"Gran Premio Asociación Española de Críticos de Arte" (AECA), ARCO '99, Madrid, Espagne. "Doctor Honoris Causa de la Universidad de Carabobo", Valencia, Venezuela. "Orden Arturo Michelena en su Unica Clase", Alcaldía de Valencia, Venezuela. "Premio de la Crítica en la especialidad de Artes Visuales Internacional", El Círculo de Críticos de Arte, Santiago, Chile.

== Bibliography ==
- Abadie, Daniel. Entrevista para el catálogo de la Exposición Soto: cuarenta años de creación, Museo de Arte Contemporáneo de Caracas, 1983
- Abadie, Daniel; Gómez, Hannia; Nordmann, Agnés and Pierre, Arnaud. Soto A Gran Escala. Published by MACCSI. ISBN 980-272-232-4
- Boulton, Alfredo. Jesús Soto. Editorial Armitano, 1973
- Brodsky, Estrellita and Rich, Sarah. Soto: Paris and Beyond, 1950-1970. New York University, 2012. ISBN 978-0-934349-16-1
- Clay, Jean. Rostros del Arte Moderno. Monte Avila Editores, Caracas, 1971
- Cuevas, Tatiana, Obrist, Hans Ulrich, Santoscoy, Paola. Jesús Rafael Soto. "Visión en Movimiento", 2007. ISBN 987-21336-3-8
- Hernández D’Jesus, Enrique. Entrevista publicada em el suplemento especial del Diario de Caracas, 1993
- Huerta, Ninoska. Soto Classical and Modern. Fundación Corp Group Centro Cultural, Caracas, 2000. ISBN 978-980-6334-42-7
- Jiménez, Ariel. Texto para el catálogo de la exposición retrospectiva de Jesús Soto. Francia, Abbaye Saint André Centre d’Art Contemporain Meymac. 1992
- Jiménez, Ariel. Texto para el catálogo de la exposición SOTO: Re-pensar lo visible, Museo de Arte Contemporáneo de Maracay Mario Abreu, 1993
- Jiménez, Ariel. Jesús Soto in Conversation with Ariel Jiménez. Fundación Cisneros/Colección Patricia Phelps de Cisneros ISBN 978-0-9823544-6-9
- Joray, Marcel and Soto, Jesús Rafael. Soto. Éditions du Griffon, Paris, 1984. ASIN: B0018PFZBK
- Lemaire, Gerard-Georges. Soto (Serie Mains et merveilles). Editions La Difference, Paris, 1997 ISBN 978-2-7291-1113-7
- Messer, Thomas M., Renard, Claude-Louis, Soto, Jesús. Soto: A Retrospective Exhibition, catalogue published to coincide with the exhibition. Accompanying text in English, French and Spanish, Published by: The Solomon R Guggenheim Museum, New York, 1974.

== See also ==
- National Prize of Plastic Arts of Venezuela
