= Jesús Soto Museum of Modern Art =

Museum of modern art in Ciudad Bolívar, Venezuela

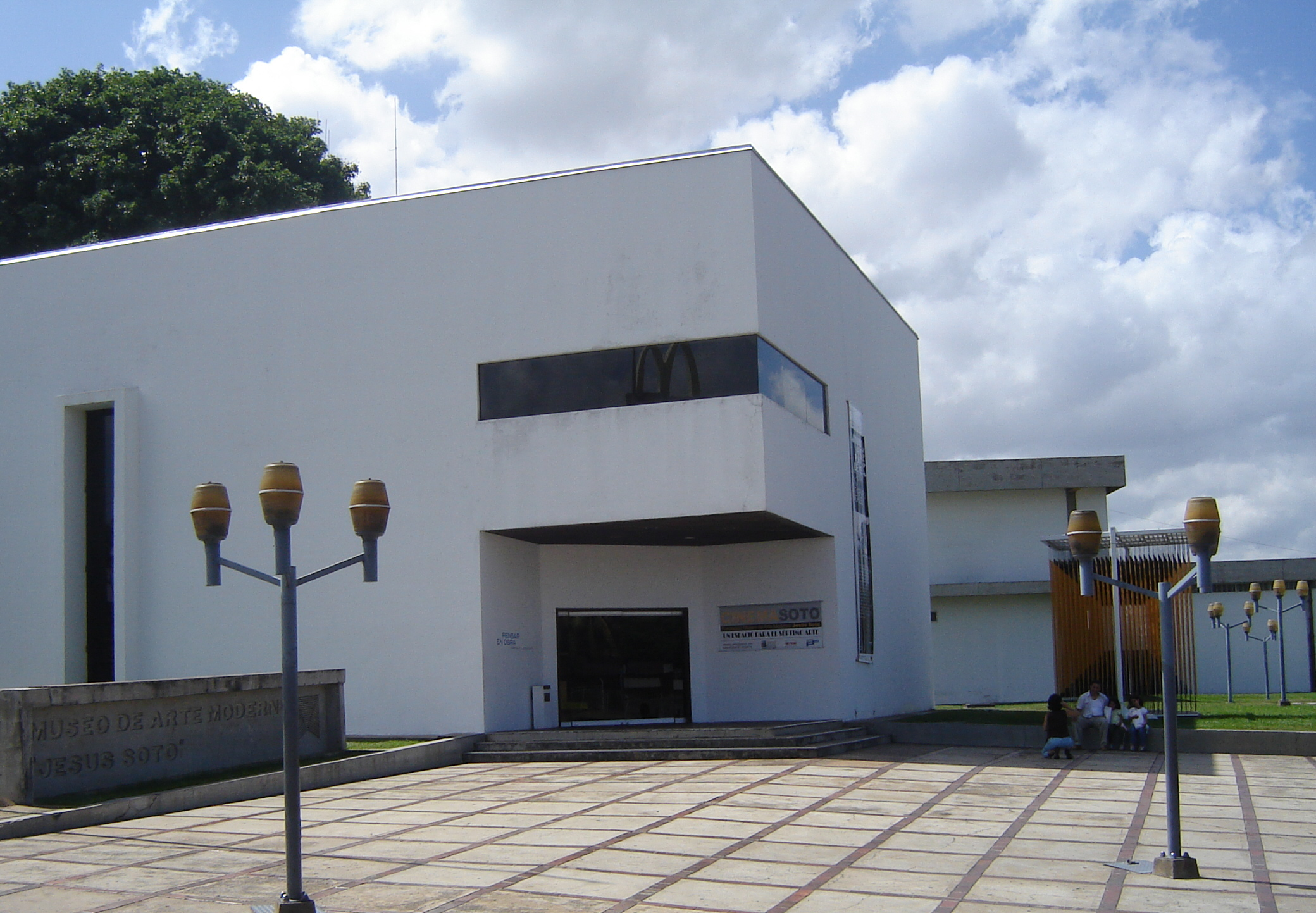
- Established: 1973
- Location: Ciudad Bolívar, Venezuela
- Coordinates: 08°07′57″N 63°32′13″W
- Website: Information about the museum on the Soto website

The Jesús Soto Museum of Modern Art (Spanish: Museo de Arte Moderno Jesús Soto) is a museum of modern art in Ciudad Bolívar, Venezuela. It is named after the kinetic artist and sculptor Jesús Rafael Soto, who was born in Ciudad Bolívar. The museum, which opened in 1973, is a late work of the Venezuelan modernist architect Carlos Raúl Villanueva. It contains 350 works of art, by a variety of artists, including Soto.

== History ==
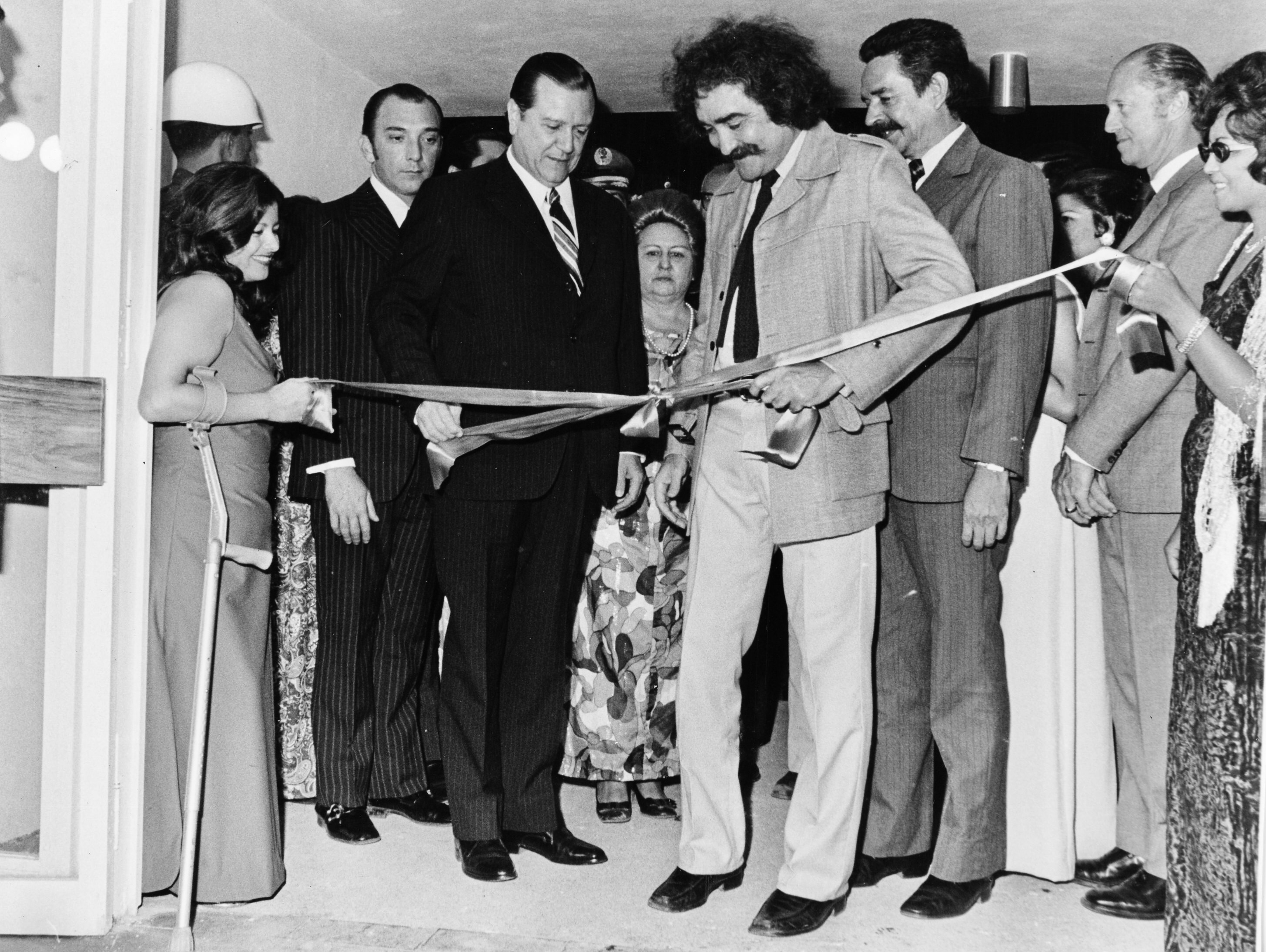
President Rafael Caldera (left of center) opening the museum on 25 August 1973

In 1959, Jesús Rafael Soto won Venezuela's National Prize for Plastic Arts; at the ceremony he announced his intention to start a museum in his hometown, Ciudad Bolívar, but it was only in the late 1960s that he began donating artwork to the city. The donation in about 1969 included a large amount of property and pieces that were representative of his various artistic periods. The government in Ciudad Bolívar welcomed Soto's proposal, as it had no cultural institutions at the time, and in 1968 offered the neoclassical Casa Wantzelius in the city center for the museum. Architect Carlos Raúl Villanueva, whose experience creating the art-infused University City of Caracas campus made him the ideal candidate to design an architectural space for housing art, first drafted a plan to renovate the Casa Wantzelius before it was discovered that the building was too damaged to proceed. In 1969, the state governor gave Soto and Villanueva an area of land between the old and new towns. This also allowed more originality in Villanueva's design.

The museum, which covers 1,080 m^{2} (11,600 sq ft), was constructed over a period of only nine and a half months in 1971; Soto visited the fresh site on 21 February, and the completion was announced on 4 December. The museum is located at the intersection of Germanías Avenue and Mario Briceño Avenue. It is one of the buildings in the New Cultural Center planned neighborhood.

The III biennial "Pueblos en Resistencia" was held in the museum in 2019.

== Design ==
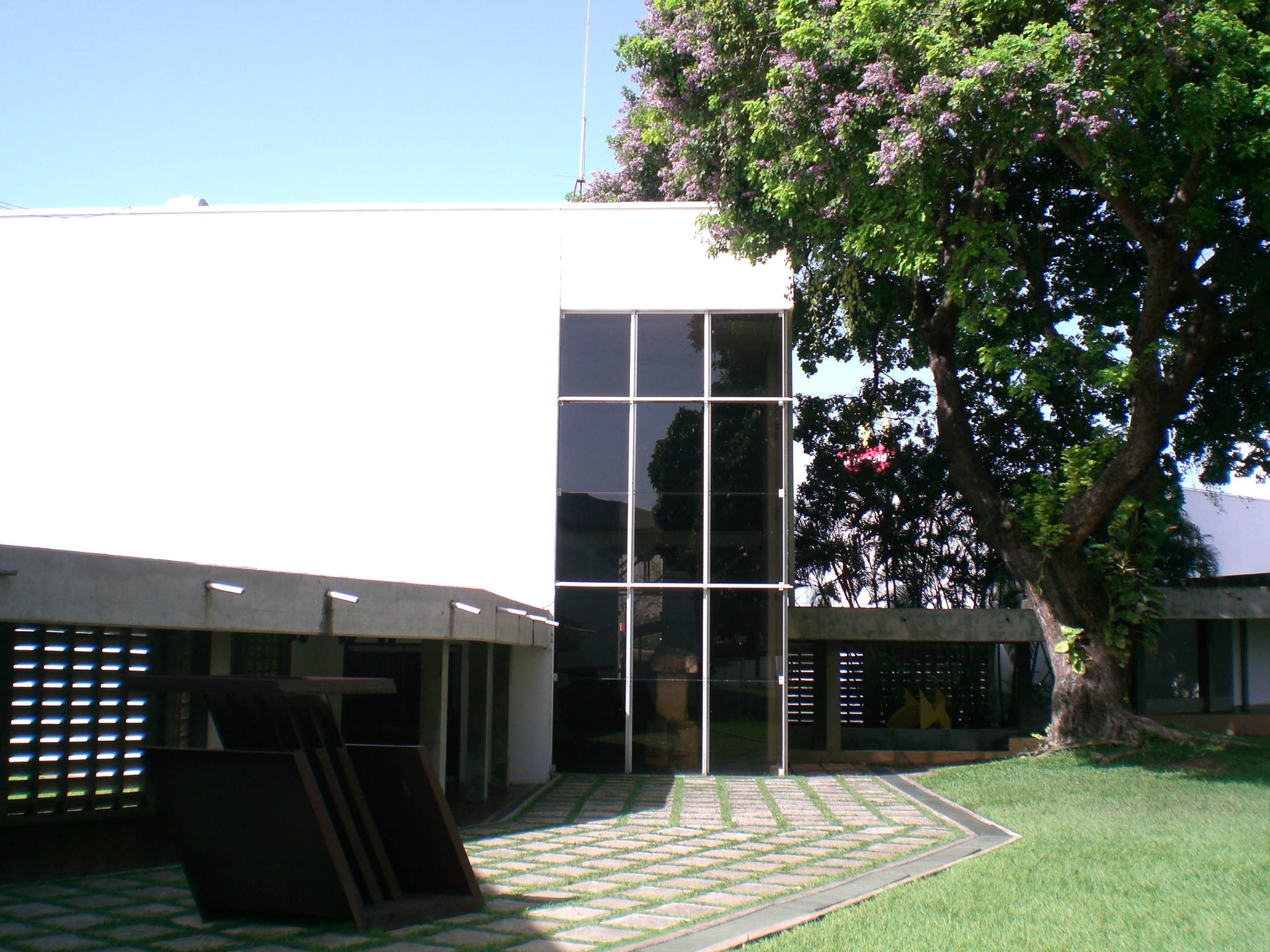
The museum from the garden

Soto was good friends with Villanueva, who, in his later career beginning with the Venezuelan pavilion at the Montreal Expo in 1967, "tried to formulate architecture of essential features, of the greatest refinement and simplicity". Villanueva in this period felt that buildings were meant to hold things, and wanted to create buildings "without anything useless [...] and so pure that there is no longer an appreciable difference between roofs, walls and natural spaces." One of the buildings of the museum replicates the Montreal Expo pavilion, standing 13 m (43 ft) high.

Six buildings comprise the museum, and they are connected by covered walkways. Between the buildings and walkways is an internal garden which displays artworks by Soto and others as an open-air museum. The design of the museum is reminiscent of Roman villas and Cathedral cloisters. Villanueva was inspired by Mediterranean architecture and contracted builders from Andalusia, Spain, for the project.

The buildings are relatively uniform, as they are all 10 m (33 ft) wide. However, there are various design differences. The first building has two storeys; besides being the entrance to the museum it is used for administration. In the following four buildings, artworks unsuitable for outside are exhibited. The sixth building is very tall and designed after the Venezuelan pavilion in Montreal. The administration building has its load-bearing columns set back so that the roof overhangs, the fourth building has two storeys, and the modular layout inside the exhibition buildings differ to accommodate the artwork. The interior walls do not reach the roofs, and there are gaps between the top of the external walls and the roofs, creating "a strip of natural light" and so fulfilling Villanueva's principle "that the roof, walls and natural spaces merge integrated into the architecture."

The garden was designed for the best sunlight and to work in the space between buildings. The second, third, and fourth buildings of the complex all have three plain walls to increase exhibition space, with the fourth wall being almost entirely open to "make nature another exhibition object."

== Art ==
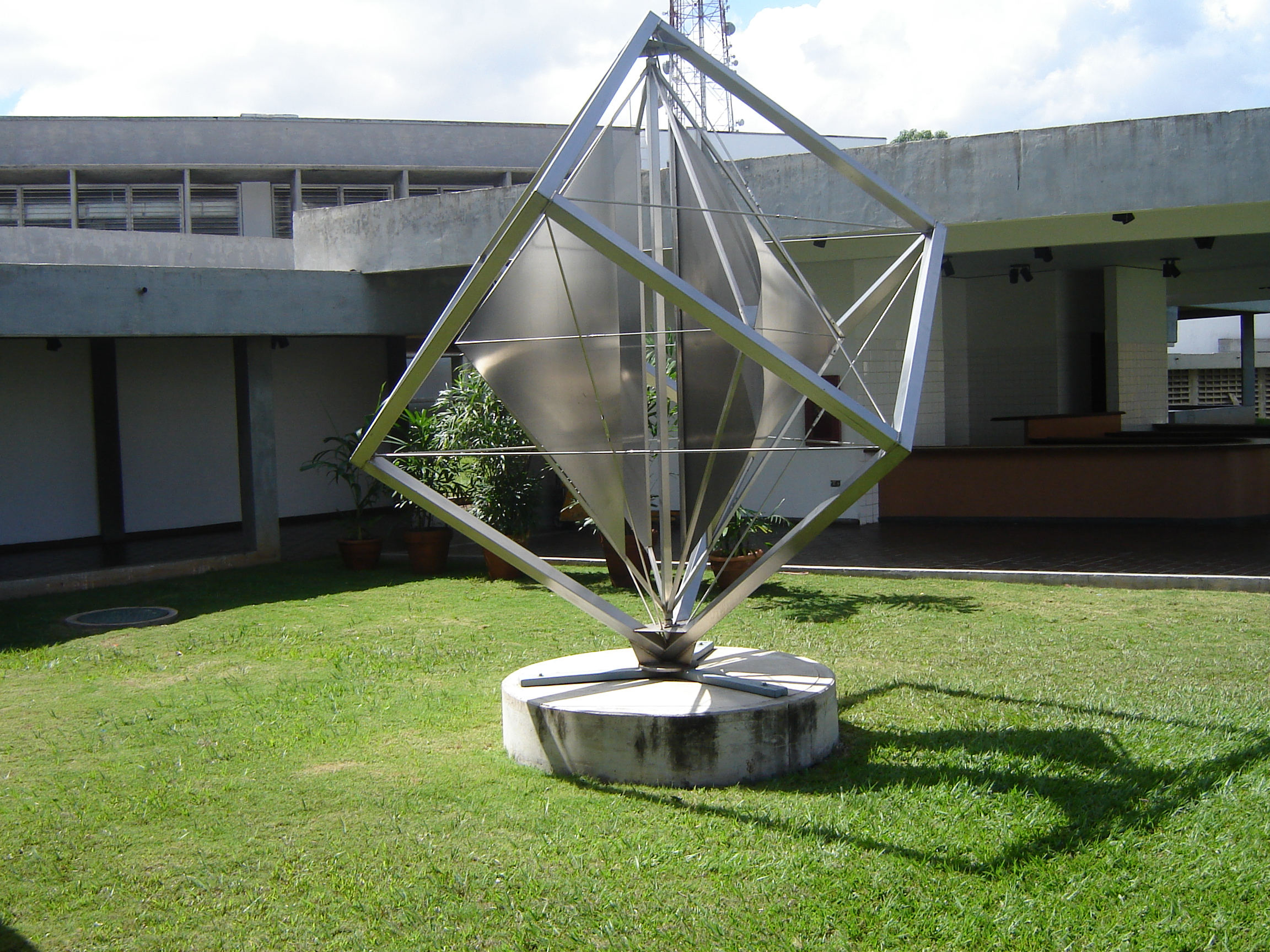
A sculpture by Alejandro Otero at the museum

The museum showcases Soto's works, but also includes art by international artists, particularly pieces with movement and dynamics. At its opening, there were eight Soto works in the museum: Muro Óptico (1952), Muro Blanco (1953), Ritmo Vibratorio (1957), Relaciones y Vibración (1964), Relaciones Negro-Plata (1966), Relaciones Virtuales (1967), Ambiente, extensión blanca (1971), and Vibración Central (1971). By 2012, there were 350 works housed at the museum; 122 of these are from international kinetic artists, and the remainder are works by Venezuelan artists including Soto, Carlos Cruz-Diez, Rafael Martínez, Alejandro Otero, Manuel Mérida, Armando Pérez and Francisco Salazar.
