= Alejandro Otero =

Venezuelan artist

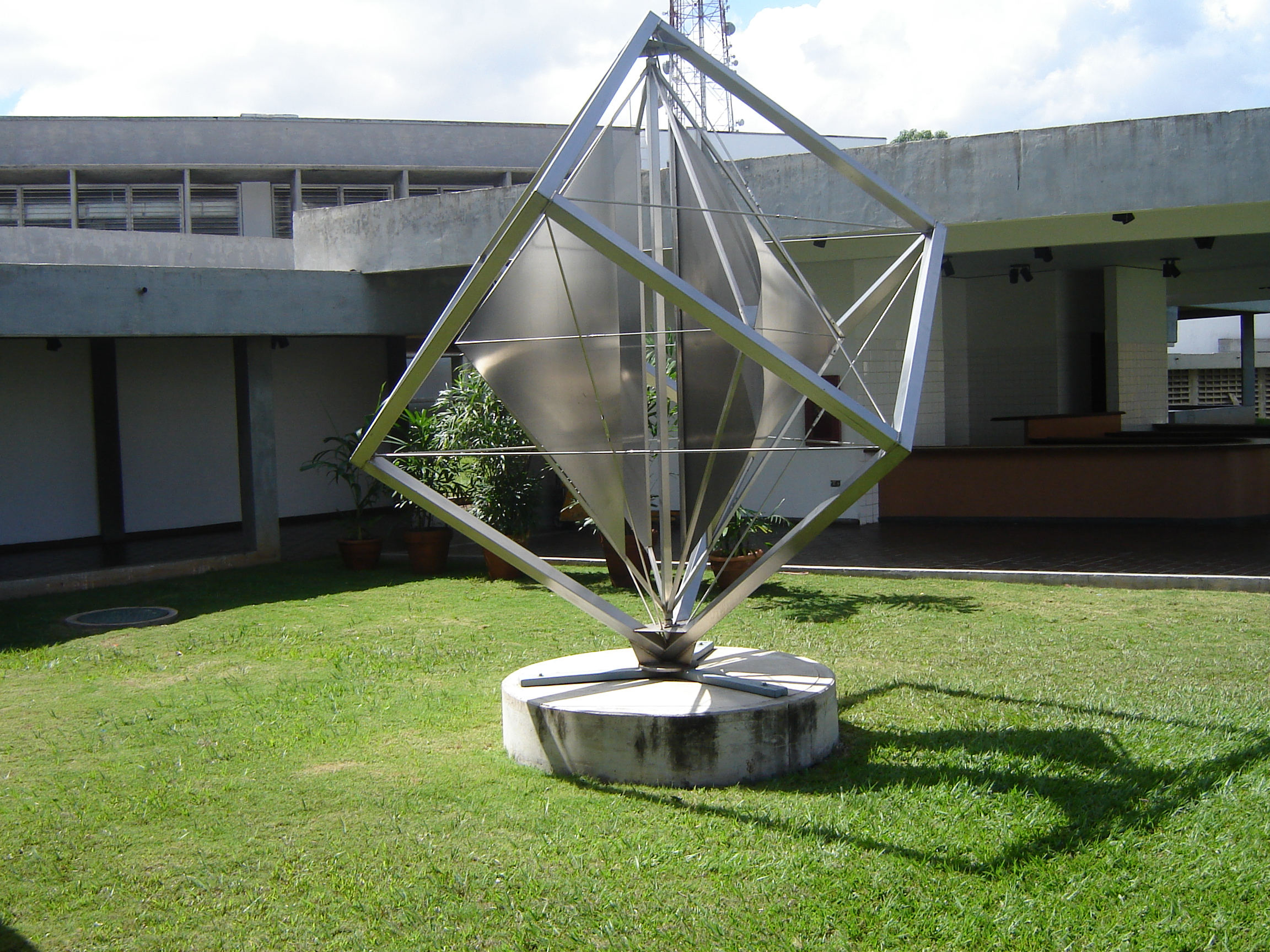
- A sculpture by Alejandro Otero at Jesús Soto Museum of Modern Art
- Born: March 7, 1921; El Manteco, Bolívar
- Died: August 13, 1990 (aged 69); Caracas
- Known for: geometric abstract painter, sculptor, writer, cultural promoter
- Movement: Op Art, Geometric abstraction
- Spouse: Mercedes Pardo
- Awards: 1940 - First prize in the First Venezuelan Official Art Salon / 1958: Otero was awarded the National Prize for Painting in the Official Salon / 1959:represented Venezuela in the Biennale of São Paulo, receiving an honourable mention

Alejandro Otero (El Manteco, Bolívar, March 7, 1921 — Caracas, August 13, 1990) was a Venezuelan painter of Geometric abstraction, a sculptor, a writer and a cultural promoter. He was a founding member of the Los Disidentes group.

== Early life ==
Alejandro Otero studied art at the Escuela de Artes Plásticas y Artes Aplicadas de Caracas from 1939 to 1945. In 1940 he won a prize in the First Venezuelan Official Art Salon. After his studies, Otero traveled to New York and Paris where he focused his work on a revision of Cubism in 1945, living in Paris until 1952. In 1945 he also went to Washington, D.C., where he exhibited figurative works at the Pan American Union. He was married to Venezuelan artist Mercedes Pardo in London, 1951. Descendants: Mercedes Otero Pardo, Carolina Otero Pardo, Alejandro Otero Pardo and Gil Otero Pardo

== Career ==
He produced some of his most important pictorial series in Paris, including Las Cafeteras (The Coffee Pots), painted between 1946 and 1948, which marks his transition from representation to abstraction. Shown at the Museo de Bellas Artes in Caracas in 1949, these paintings caused a critical uproar in culturally conservative Venezuela, which ultimately, helped trigger the emergence of modernist abstraction in Venezuela. This works became well known in 1948 at an exhibition in Washington, D.C. since they served as a transition for Otero to overcome Realism and start a new era for Venezuelan painting.

In 1950, Otero traveled in the Netherlands, seeking out the work of Piet Mondrian, an artist who became pivotal for the development of Otero's new series of works, including Líneas de color sobre fondo blanco (Colored Lines on a White Background) of 1951 and Collages ortogonales (Orthogonal Collages) of 1951–52. These latter works, dynamic collages that featured a tight weave of horizontal and vertical bands of multihued paper, show the artist experimenting with the spatial and optical effects of line and color. The idea of the module in Otero's practice first emerged in these works, in which he exhaustively explored a dynamic conception of space and pictorial structure typical of Op Art and Kinetic Art.

Drawn back to Caracas, he was invited to participate in the integration of the visual arts into the architectural program of the Ciudad Universitaria de Caracas, a project directed and promoted by the architect Carlos Raúl Villanueva, and considered the most advanced effort in architecture and urbanism in the country. As part of a large group of Venezuelan and foreign artists (including Hans Arp, Alexander Calder, Fernand Léger, Victor Vasarely, Mateo Manaure, Francisco Narváez, and Jesús Rafael Soto) contributing to the project, Otero realized a series of large-scale public works, including murals, stained glass windows, and Policromías (Polychromies), facades in glass mosaic.

Between 1955 and 1960, he developed the extraordinary series of seventy-five Colorhythms, one of his major contributions to the field of painting. In 1955, Otero produced his first Colorhythm. Painted with Duco, a shiny industrial lacquer, applied with spray guns or rollers on wood or Plexiglas, the Colorhythms are large-scale immersive compositional modules executed on rectangular supports. Structured by parallel, evenly spaced, dark vertical bands on white grounds, the paintings have color markings placed between the bands, which activate the entire structure of the plane. In these works, Otero succeeded in emphasizing rhythm and color over form, resulting in a suggestive spatial ambiguity typical of Op Art. As a consequence of optical intensity, chromatic vibration, and rhythmic movement, the picture plane seems to expand dynamically outwards. With the Coloryhthms, Otero proposed an idea of particular importance: the notion of the plane as a spatial field of forces in constant expansion, functioning simultaneously as immersive painting, volume, and architecture.

In 1958 Otero was awarded the National Prize for Painting in the Official Salon, and in 1959 he represented Venezuela in the São Paulo Art Biennial, receiving an honourable mention. He is in the collection of The Museum of Modern Art (MoMA) in New York City.

In the 1960s he abandoned painting in order to work on a larger scale in his civic sculptures, such as Delta Solar. He also produced collages of objets trouvés, as in Page Picture No. 1. Towards the end of his life he carried out many monumental public art commissions in many American cities. In 2012 the exhibition Resonant Space: The Colorhythms of Alejandro Otero organized by the Instituto de Arte Contemporânea (IAC), was presented at the Pinacoteca do Estado de São Paulo, Brazil.

== Gallery ==
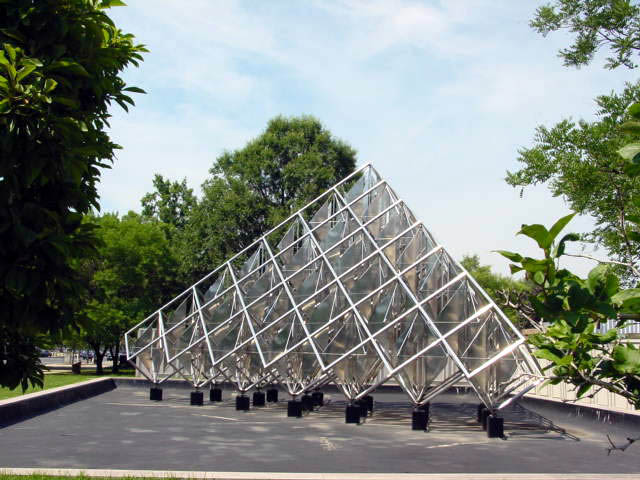

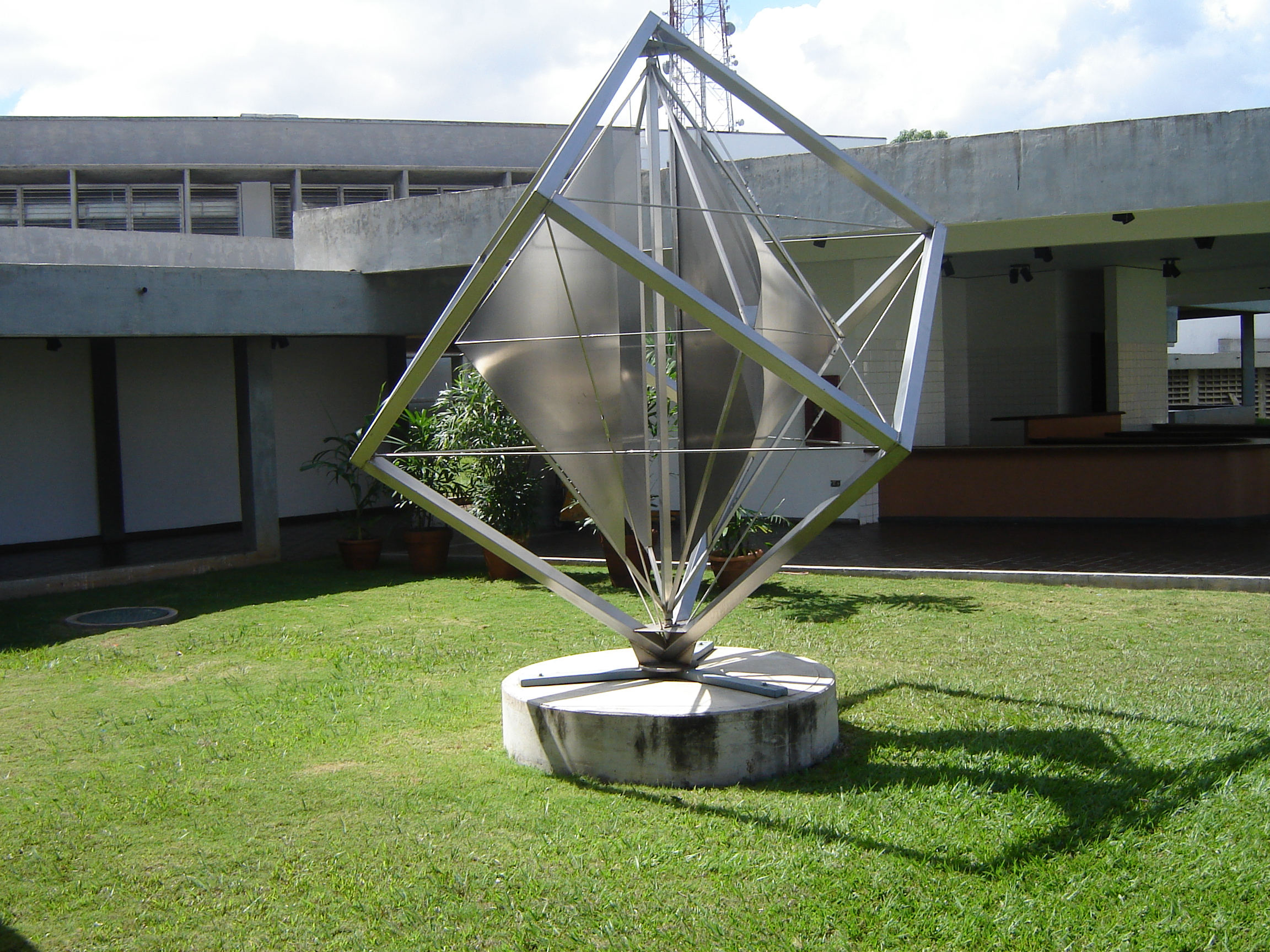

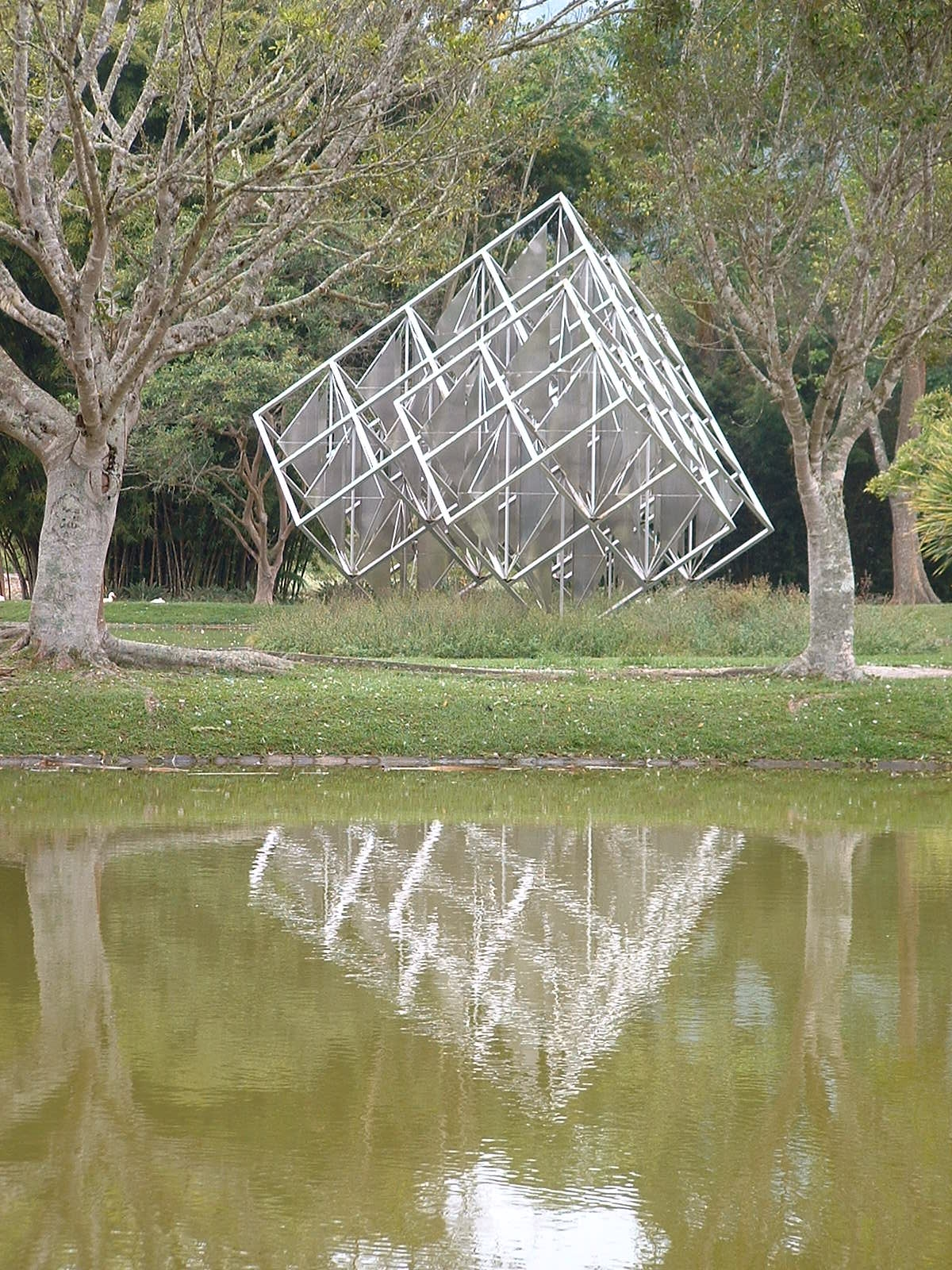

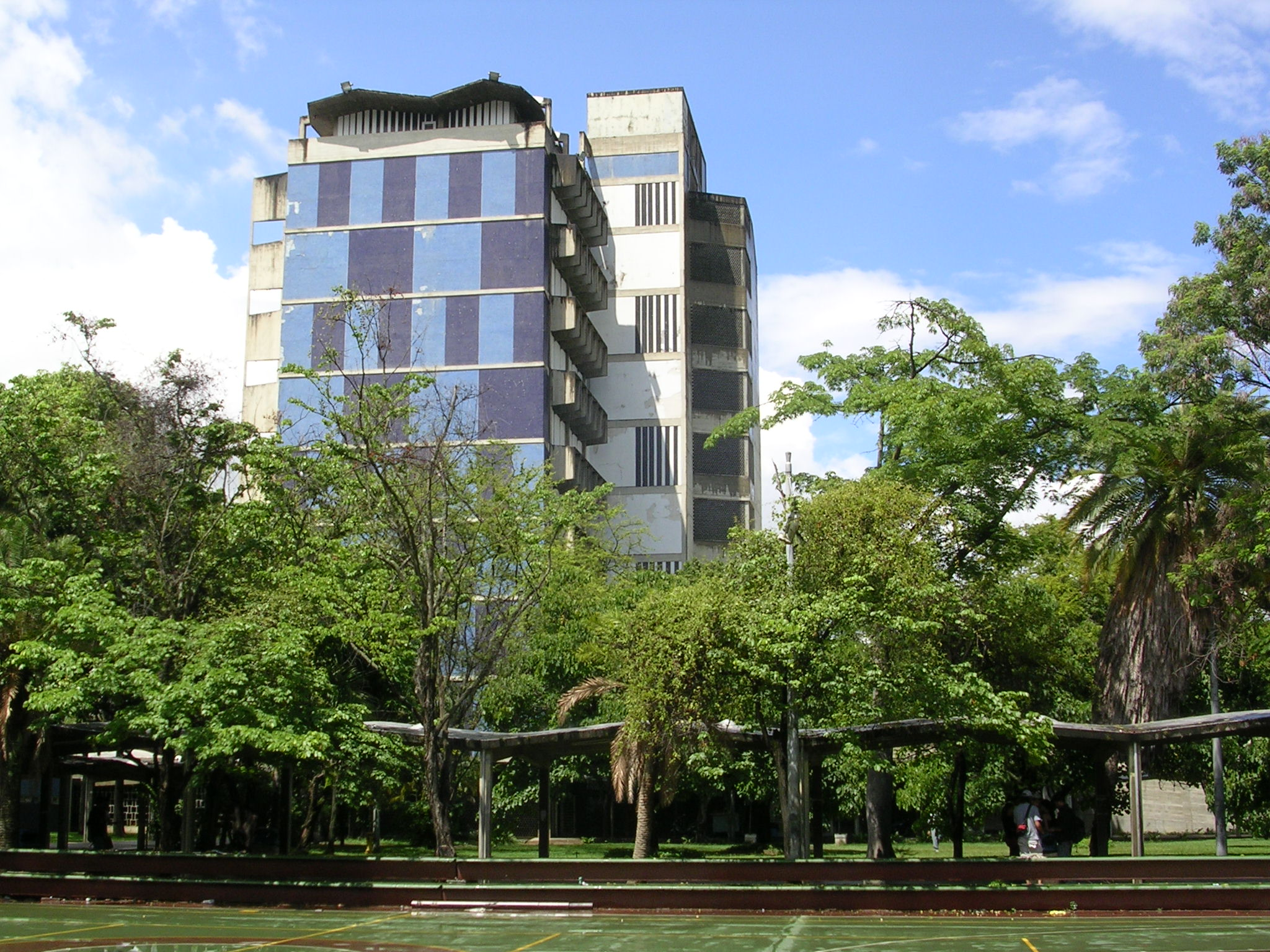

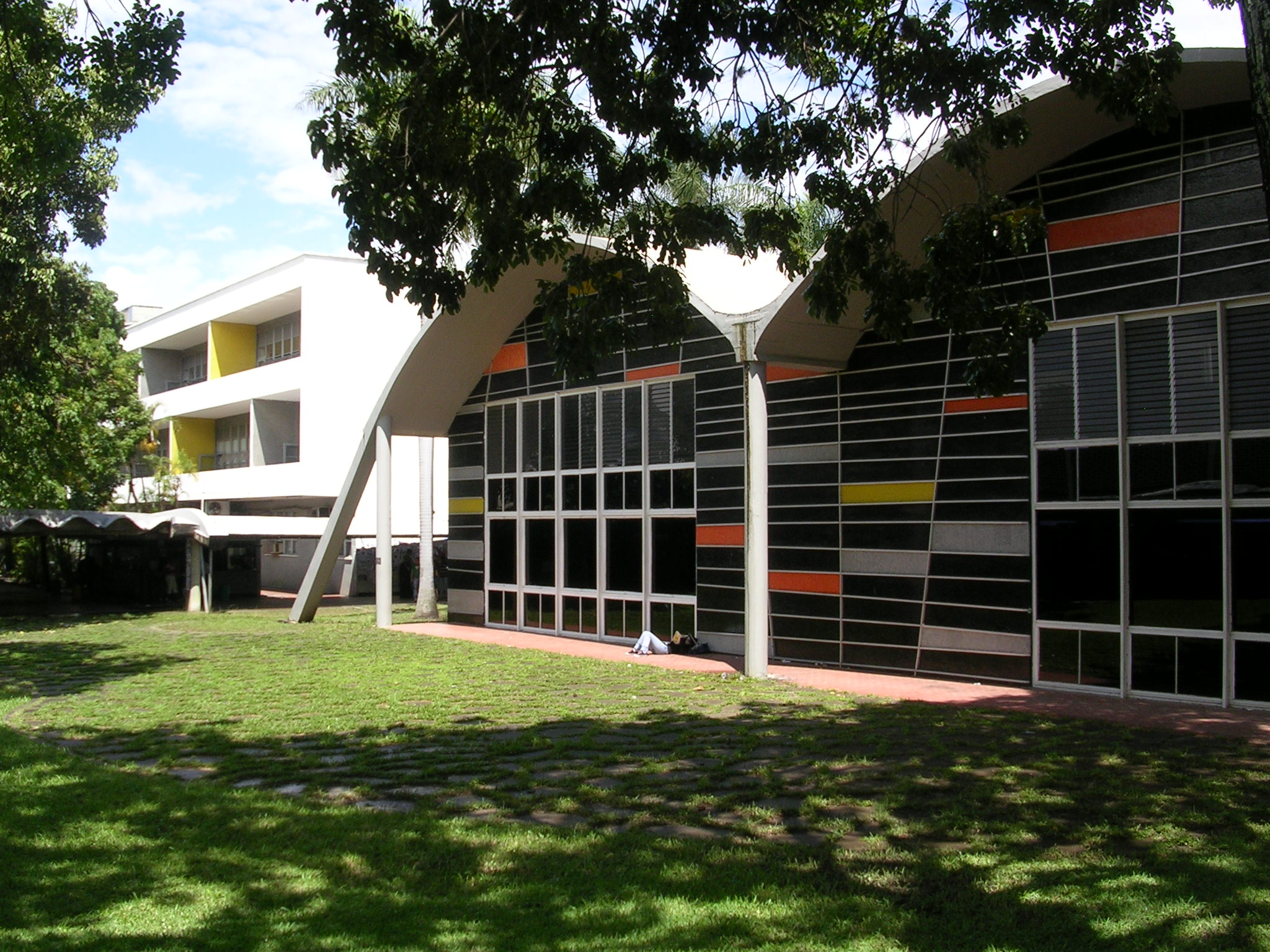

== Selected works ==
- The Bottle and the Lamp I at the Museum of Modern Art, 1947
- Blue Coffee Maker at the Museum of Modern Art, 1947
- Colored Lines on White Background at the Museum of Modern Art, 1950
- Ortogonal (Collage) 1 at the Museum of Modern Art, 1951
- Ortogonal (Collage) 2 at the Museum of Modern Art, 1951
- Ortogonal (Collage) 3 at the Museum of Modern Art, 1951
- Ortogonal (Collage) 4 at the Museum of Modern Art, 1951
- Ortogonal (Collage) 5 at the Museum of Modern Art, 1951
- Ortogonal (Collage) 6 at the Museum of Modern Art, 1951
- Ortogonal (Collage) 7 at the Museum of Modern Art, 1951
- Ortogonal (Collage) 8 at the Museum of Modern Art, 1952
- Ortogonal (Collage) 9 at the Museum of Modern Art, 1952
- Ortogonal (Collage) 10 at the Museum of Modern Art, 1952
- Study 1 at the Museum of Modern Art, 1952
- Study 2 at the Museum of Modern Art, 1952
- Study 3 at the Museum of Modern Art, 1952
- Study 4 at the Museum of Modern Art, 1952
- Study 5 at the Museum of Modern Art, 1952
- Pampatar Board at the Museum of Modern Art, 1954
- Colorhythm 12 at the Museum of Modern Art, 1956
- Colorhythm 39 at the Museum of Modern Art, 1959
- Untitled (Study for Colorhythm) at the Museum of Modern Art, 1959
- Bloody Mary at the Museum of Modern Art, 1961
- My Dear Friend at the Museum of Modern Art, 1962
- Board 1 at the Museum of Modern Art, 1976

== See also ==
- Delta Solar sculpture at the National Air & Space Museum
