= Delta Solar =

Artwork by Alejandro Otero

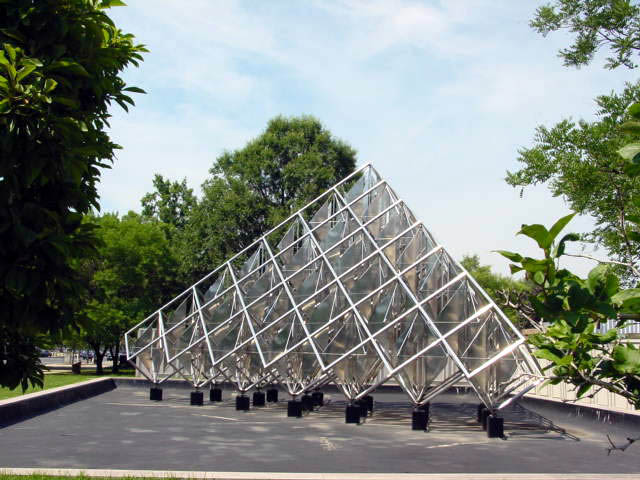
- Artist: Alejandro Otero
- Year: 1977
- Type: Stainless steel
- Dimensions: 8.2 m × 12 m (27 ft × 40 ft)
- Location: National Air and Space Museum, Washington, D.C., United States; 38.887976°N 77.021485°W
- Owner: Smithsonian Institution

Delta Solar is a public artwork by Venezuelan sculptor Alejandro Otero located outside of the National Air and Space Museum in Washington, DC, United States. Delta Solar is meant to pay homage to modern technology and the Inca sun cult.

== Description ==
This abstract sculpture consists of stainless steel "sails" that move in the breeze. They are attached to an open geometric grid formed into the shape of a Delta Formation. It sits on concrete and in a reflecting pool.

Front

Proper Left

Back

== Acquisition ==
The sculpture was dedicated on June 29, 1977 by Carlos Andrés Pérez, president of Venezuela as a gift celebrating the Bicentennial of the American Revolution. The sculpture was originally supposed to be dedicated in the Spring, however, cold weather prohibited the pouring of concrete for the base of the structure.

== See also ==
- Ad Astra, Lippold sculpture
- Continuum sculpture
- List of public art in Washington, D.C., Ward 2
