= Mercedes Pardo =

Venezuelan artist (1921–2005)

- Born: July 29, 1921; Caracas, Venezuela
- Died: March 24, 2005 (aged 83); San Antonio de Los Altos, Venezuela
- Known for: Painting
- Movement: Abstract Art
- Spouses: Marco Bonta (m. 1945, divorced) Alejandro Otero (m. 1951)

Mercedes Clementina Marta del Carmen Pardo Ponte, known as Mercedes Pardo (July 29, 1921 – March 24, 2005) was a Venezuelan abstract art painter.

== Biography ==
Pardo was born July 29, 1921 (or July 20, 1921, according to her obituary in El País) in Caracas, Venezuela. By age 13 she began taking free classes at the Academia de Bellas Artes.

In 1941 she joined the Escuela de Artes Plásticas y Aplicadas in Caracas. She was active in painting, printmaking, and collage, and in 1991 the National Art Gallery in Caracas held an exhibition to review her work from 1941 to 1991.

In 1945 she married Marco Bonta, a professor of stained glass and mural painting. Their marriage was short.

In 1947 she attended the Academy of Fine Arts of Santiago in Chile where she had her first one-woman show. In 1949 she moved to Paris and attended the École du Louvre.

In 1951 she married the painter Alejandro Otero.

She died on March 24, 2005, in San Antonio de Los Altos, Venezuela.

== Legacy ==
The Fundación Alejandro Otero-Mercedes Pardo was established in 2016. It is located at Alejandro Otero and Mercedes Pardo's house in San Antonio de Los Altos.

In 2023 her work was included in the exhibition Action, Gesture, Paint: Women Artists and Global Abstraction 1940-1970 at the Whitechapel Gallery in London.

== Exhibitions ==
- 1947 Pacific Room, Santiago de Chile
- 1962 MBA
- 1964 "Signs", Sala Mendoza
- 1967 "Signs", Librería Cruz del Sur, Caracas
- 1969 "1 x 9 color of silkscreen", MBA
- 1970 "Recent works of Mercedes Pardo", Sala Mendoza
- 1971 Center of Fine Arts, Maracaibo
- 1974 Aele Gallery, Madrid
- 1977 Adler Gallery / Castillo, Caracas / El Parque Art Center, Valencia, Edo. Carabobo / Pecanins Gallery, Mexico City
- 1978 "From the workshop of Mercedes Pardo today, National Art Gallery", Caracas / Museum of Modern Art, Mexico City
- 1979 "Color, skin, meditated presence: anthological exhibition by Mercedes Pardo", GAN / Galería Adler / Castillo, Caracas
- 1980 "Mercedes Pardo in Margarita: paintings / serigraphs", Museo Francisco Narváez
- 1983 "Inesauribile Venezia", Sagitario Gallery, Caracas
- 1991 "Moradas del color", GAN
- 1993 "Graphic work of Mercedes Pardo", Consulate of Venezuela, New York
- 1994 "Graphic work of Mercedes Pardo", The Warm Spaces
- 1995 "Graphic work of Mercedes Pardo", MRE
- 1996 Sacred Museum, Caracas
- 2000 "Mercedes Pardo, 1951–2000", MAO / "Color and shape", GAN
- 2005 House of the Culture Village of the Sea, Porlamar, Edo. Nueva Esparta / Unimet

== Awards ==
- 1942 Honorable mention in painting, III Official Salon
- 1944 José Loreto Arismendi Prize, V Official Show
- 1960 Puebla de Bolívar Prize, XXI Official Salon
- 1961 Prize of the Fina Gómez Foundation, XXII Official Show
- 1964 National Prize for Applied Arts (shared with Alejandro Otero), XXV Salón Oficial
- 1966 Enamel Prize, International Exhibition of Artistic Crafts, Stuttgart, Germany
- 1978 National Prize of Plastic Arts, Caracas
- 1980 Special Edition Purchase Award, World Print III, San Francisco, California, United States
- 1991 Armando Reverón Award, AVAP
