= Carlos Raúl Villanueva =

Venezuelan architect (1900–1975)

- Born: May 30, 1900; London, England
- Died: August 16, 1975 (aged 75); Caracas, Venezuela
- Occupation: Architect
- Spouse: Margot Arismendi Amengual
- Buildings: Museum of Fine Arts; Jesús Soto Museum
- Projects: Ciudad Universitaria de Caracas; El Silencio Redevelopment

Carlos Raúl Villanueva Astoul (May 30, 1900 – August 16, 1975) was a Venezuelan modernist architect. Raised in Europe, Villanueva went for the first time to Venezuela when he was 28 years old. He was involved in the development and modernization of Caracas, Maracay and other cities across the country. Among his works are El Silencio Redevelopment which included 7797 apartments and 207 shop premises and the Ciudad Universitaria, the main campus of the Central University of Venezuela. The Campus was declared a World Heritage Site by UNESCO in the year 2000.

== Early life and education (1900-1928) ==
Villanueva was born in the city of London on May 30, 1900. He was the son of Carlos Antonio Villanueva and Paulina Astoul from a family originally from Valencia, Spain who had settled in Venezuela in the 18th century. His father was sent as an envoy from Venezuela to the Exposition Universelle of 1889 in Paris where he met Paulina Astoul and married her in 1893. A few years later, in 1896, he was appointed Consul General of Venezuela in England by the government of Joaquín Crespo. Carlos Raúl was born four years later near the Venezuelan Consulate and was the youngest of the five children of the family. In the following years his family moved back to Paris, where he received his basic schooling at the Lycée Condorcet. Later on he moved with his family to Málaga, Spain, until 1919 when he returned to Paris. In 1922, following the footsteps of his brother Marcel, Carlos Raúl was admitted to the Second Class of the Department of Architecture of the École des Beaux-Arts and entered the workshop of Gabriel Héraud. In 1925 he entered the First Class of the Department of Architecture and worked closely with León Joseph Madeline. During that time he collaborated on a project for a Hôtel d'ambassade a construire dans un pays d'Extreme Orient with another student of Héraud's workshop, Roger-Leopold Hummel, which won the Second prize of the Grand Prix de Rome in 1928. On June 6 of the same year, he received his Architecture degree and traveled for the first time to Venezuela and the United States where he joined the architectural firm Guilbert and Betelle with his brother in Newark, New Jersey. Yet in 1929 Villanueva returned to Venezuela and started working in the Ministry of Public Works as Director of Buildings and Ornamental Constructions.

== First Modernism (1929-1944) ==
After gaining some experience in France and the United States, Villanueva arrived in Venezuela full of enthusiasm and ideas; in particular, thanks to the influence of his close friend Auguste Perret. Both men shared a profound conviction that architecture was the art of organizing space. Consequently, Villanueva sees himself as a man of action and will work countless hours to fulfill his passion. His first jobs were on the city of Maracay, a city which became the de facto capital of the country under General Juan Vicente Gómez. He received his first important assignment in 1929: the "Hotel Jardín". In his reform of the building it was possible to already observe some features that will become common in his designs. Among them were the use of covered galleries to provide protection from the weather and the use of interior courtyards and gardens to harmonize built and unbuilt spaces. On January 28, 1933, he married Margot Arismendi Amengual, a member of the prominent Venezuelan Arismendi family, and had four children with her.

His first important commission came in 1935 with the project to build the Museum of Fine Arts of Caracas. This project allowed him to create a space for the exhibition of art, one of his most important passions. Already at this time his devotion to the artistic vanguards of the century could be seen in his library, where his large collection of books on architecture was complemented by those on art. It was also during this time that he met the sculptor Francisco Narváez with whom he collaborated in the Museum of Fine Arts as well as in a series of other important projects like the "Natural Science Museum" (1936–1939) and the "Gran Colombia School" (1939–1942) which became Villanueva's first attempt to bring into fruition the guiding principle of career: the synthesis of the arts. The buildings also showed Villanueva's application of some of the most defining ideas of modern architecture like the simplification of form and the importance given to functionality.

== Ciudad Universitaria (1944-1970) ==
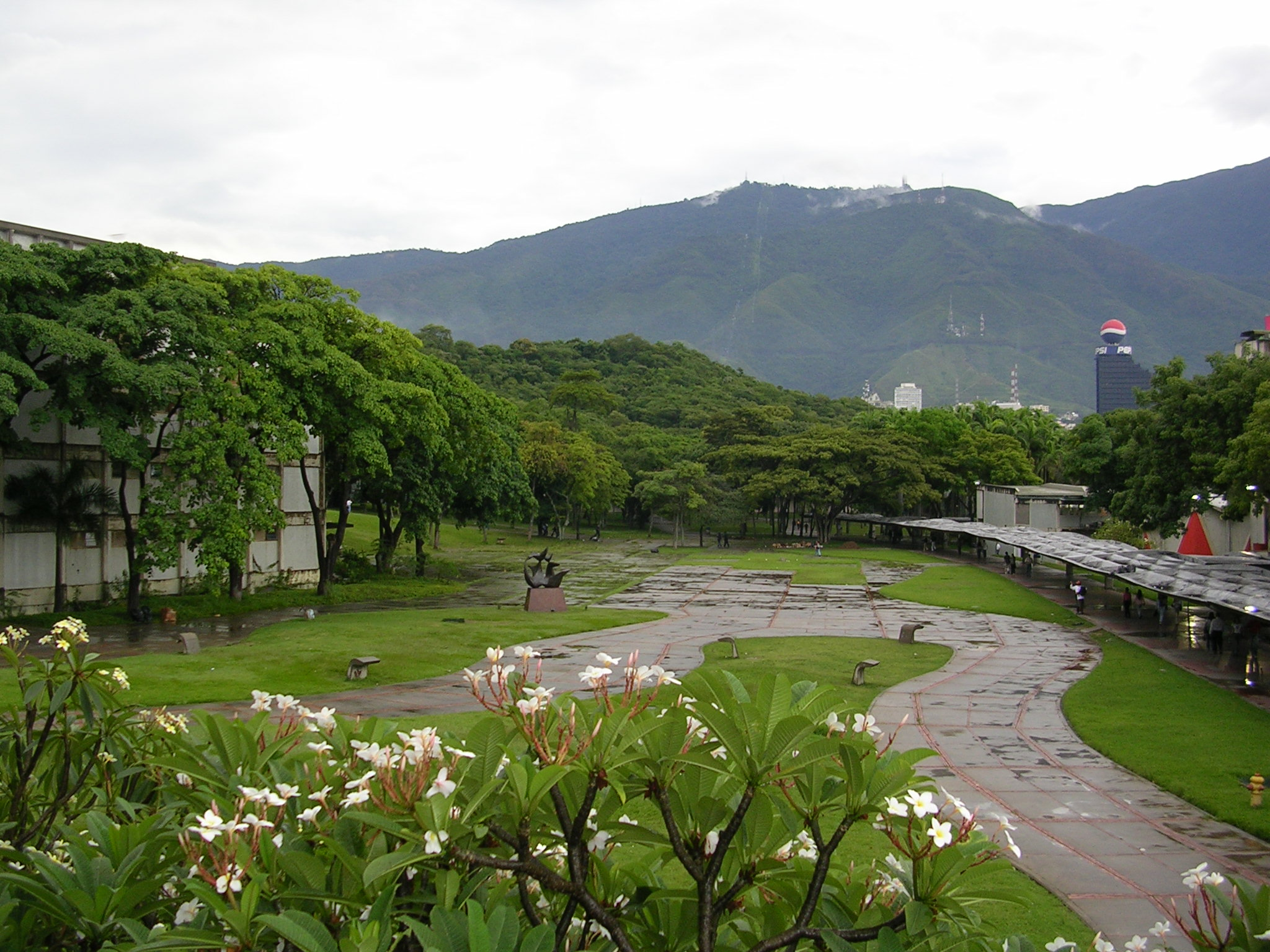
View of the Ciudad Universitaria from the library.

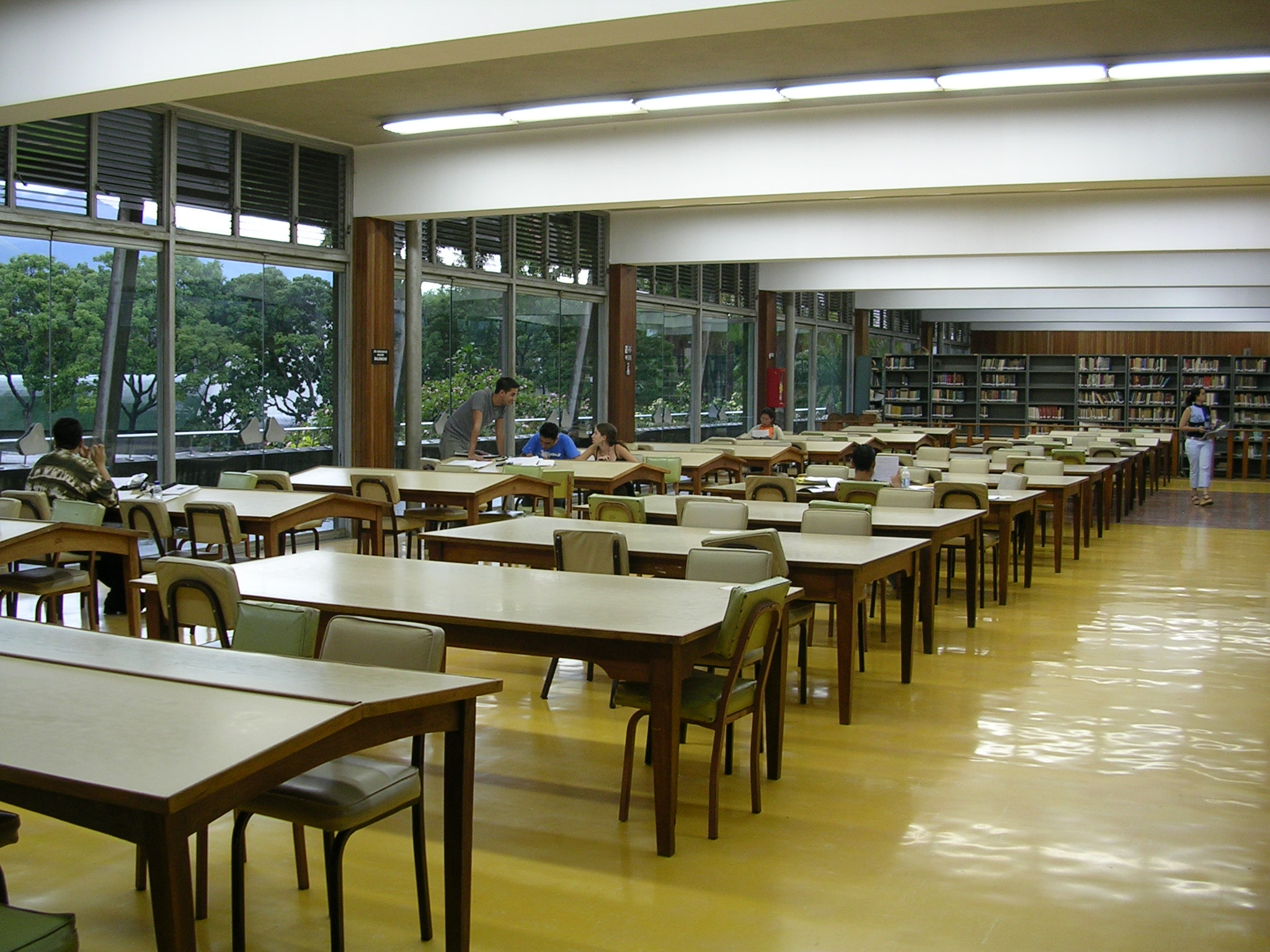
Central Library

The Campus and buildings of the Universidad Central de Venezuela are considered to be Villanueva's masterwork. Built on the site of the old Hacienda Ibarra - which originally belonged to Simon Bolívar's family - and connected to the new city center around Plaza Venezuela, the project meant a massive undertaking of both urban planning and architectural design. The administration of Isaías Medina Angarita bought the Hacienda Ibarra in 1942 in order to give the University a larger location than the San Francisco Convent, giving Villanueva a unique opportunity to applied his conscious integration of art and architecture on a grand scale. This vast urban complex of about 2 square kilometres includes a total of 40 buildings and it remains one of the most successful applications of Modern Architecture in Latin America. Villanueva worked closely with all the artists who contributed with their oeuvres and personally supervised the project for over 25 years until the late 60's when his deteriorating health forced him to leave some buildings in the design stage.

== Quotations ==
=== Synthesis of the arts ===
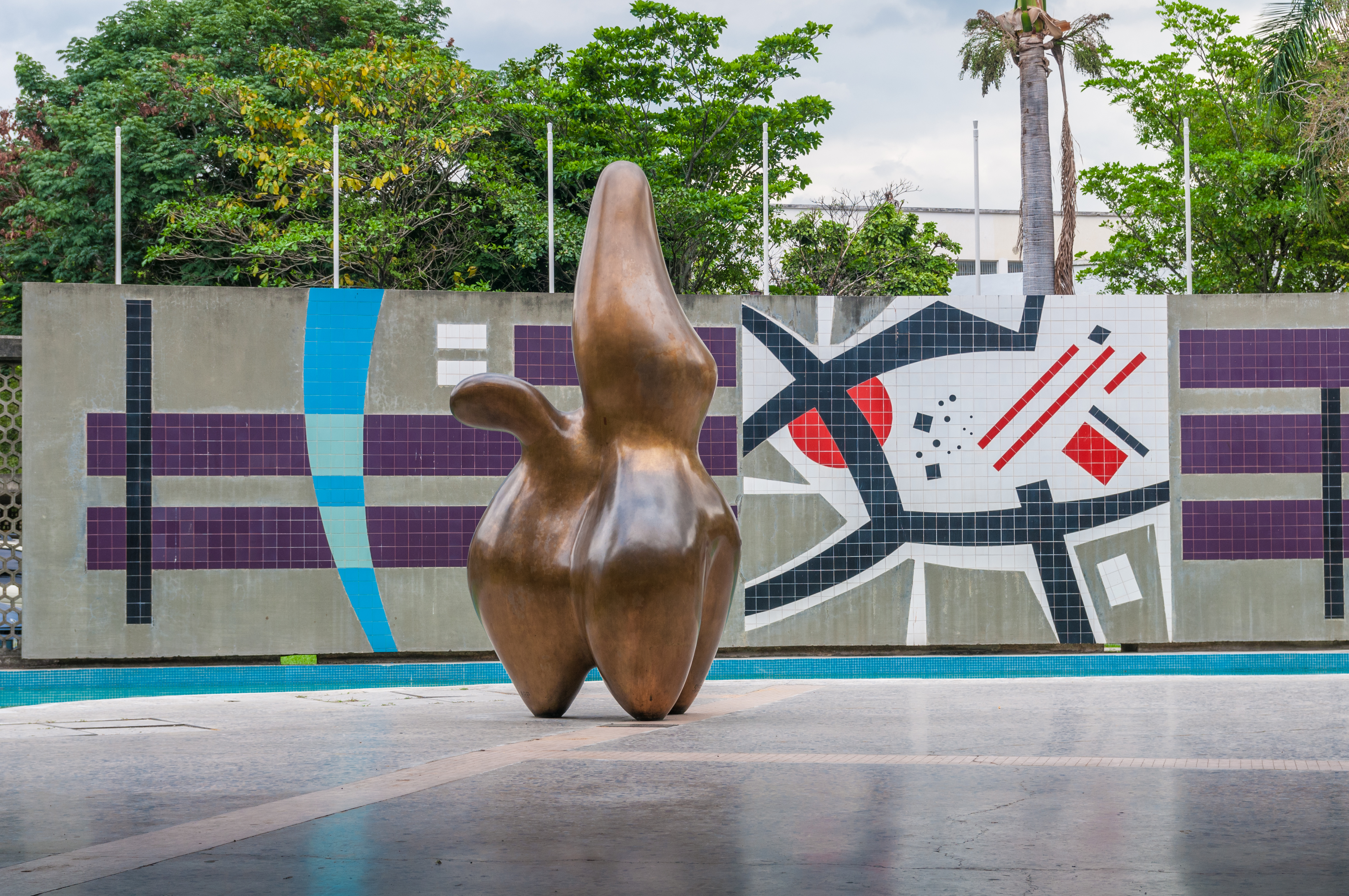
Cloud Shepherd (Hans Arp) and Mural (Mateo Manaure) at the Ciudad Universitaria

In 1954, Villanueva described the guiding principle behind the Ciudad Universitaria in the following way:

The environment of the fine arts formulates the need for the integration of painting and sculpture with architecture, for a return from the ancient elements of color and volume to the white architectonic organism, using the language of the great arts purified by a long evolutionary process. To be limited to just decorating walls or placing paintings and sculptures on improvised places does not have, in terms of the synthesis of the arts, more value than it already has in the collection of a museum. The idea of this synthesis could only give positive results when painting and sculpture find the architectonical reasons of their incorporation in the built environment, that is to say, only when the artist paints and models thinking about the spatial elements that constitute the architectonic work. The spirit of the Synthesis of the Arts is to corroborate and highlight the real space-form of the architectural design; or in an inverse process, disperse and transform the real volumes in relations that are purely special.

== Works ==
=== 1920s ===
- Banco Obrero and Banco Agrícola y Pecuario (Maracay, 1929); (currently the Museum of Anthropology and History)
- Hotel Jardín (Maracay, 1929–1930); (currently the Aragua State House)

=== 1930s ===
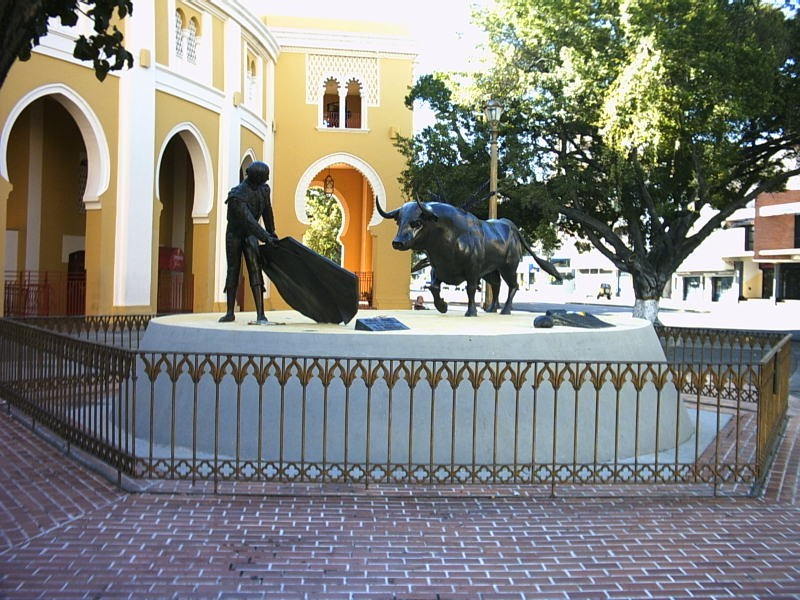
"La Maestranza" Bullring

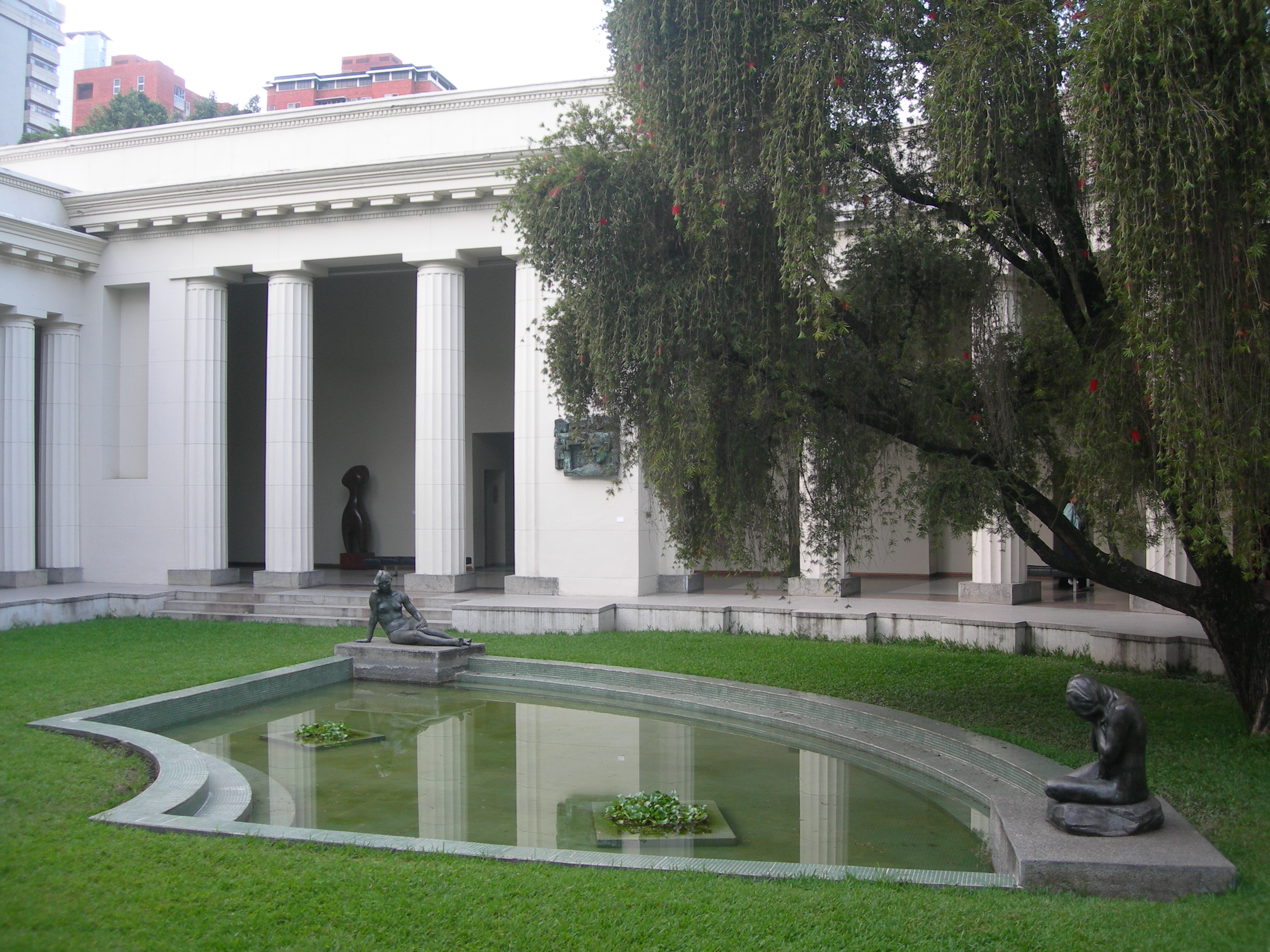
Museum of Fine Arts

- Sports Club (Maracay, 1930)
- Plaza Bolívar (Maracay, 1930–1935)
- "La Maestranza" Bullring (Maracay, 1931–1932)
- Bolivarian Museum (Caracas, 1931)
- Mental Hospital (Caracas, 1931–1933)
- Plaza Carabobo (Caracas, 1934)
- Museum of Fine Arts (Caracas, 1935–1938)
- Museum of Natural Sciences (Caracas, 1934–1935)
- Venezuelan Pavilion at the Paris Exposition (Paris, France, 1937 - Demolished)
- Plaza Simón Bolívar (Valparaíso, Chile, 1938)
- Los Rosales and El Prado Residential States (Caracas, 1938–1940)
- Gran Colombia School (Caracas, 1939–1942); (currently the Francisco Pimentel School).

=== 1940s ===
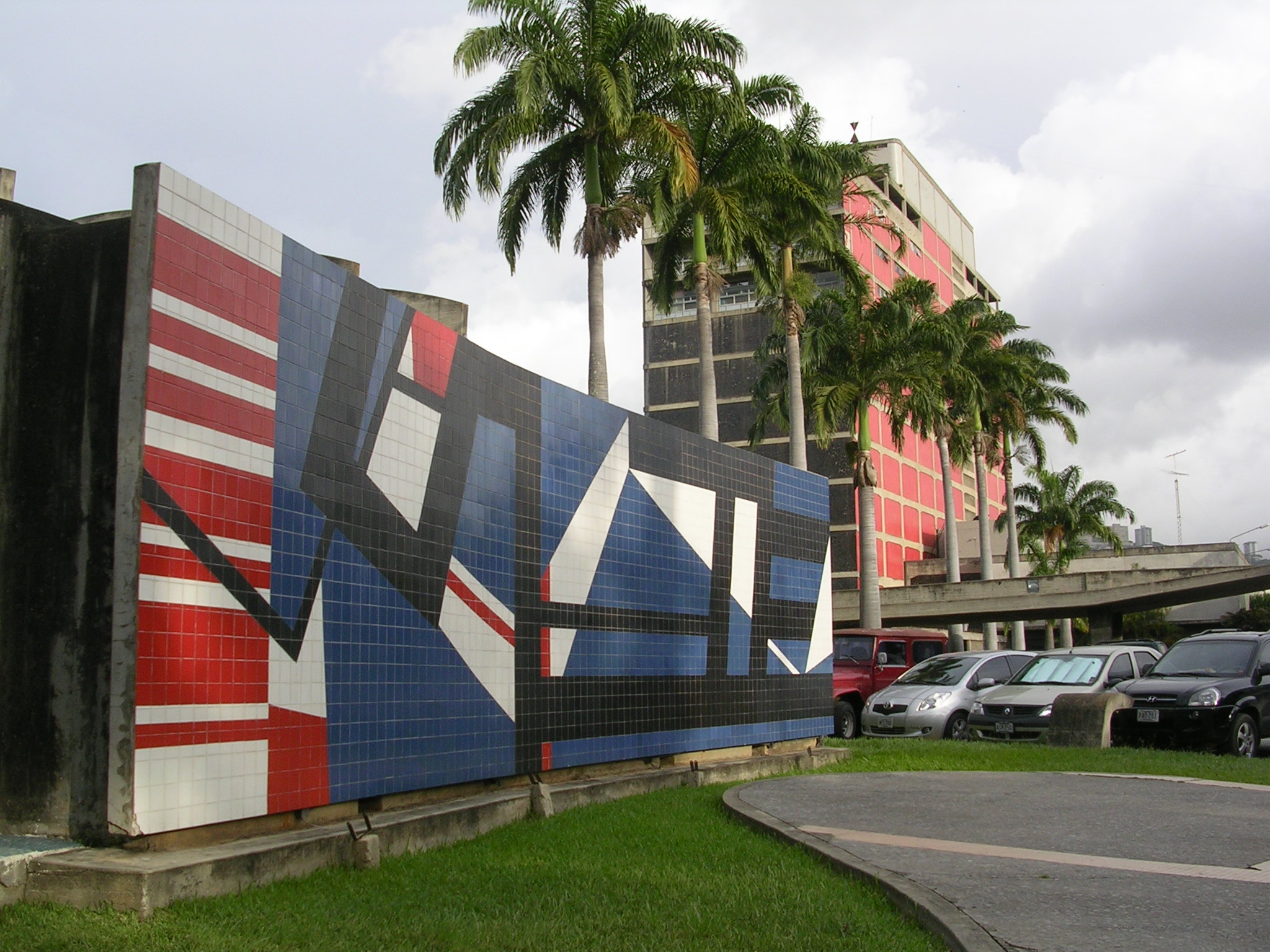
Ciudad Universitaria

- Headquarters of the Venezuelan Chamber of Commerce (Caracas, 1940)
- Plaza La Concordia (1940)
- Buena Vista Preorientation Boarding School (Los Teques, 1940–1942)
- Passenger Terminal (Valera, 1941–1942)
- El Silencio Redevelopment (Caracas, 1941–1945)
- Radio Communications Building (Caracas, 1943)
- General Rafael Urdaneta Development (Maracaibo, 1943)
- Unidad Vacacional Los Caracas (1944)
- Ciudad Universitaria de Caracas - Campus of the Central University of Venezuela (1944–1970)
- Plaza Rafael Urdaneta (Caracas, 1945)
- University Hospital (Caracas, 1945)
- Anatomical Institute (Caracas, 1945)
- Rafael Urdaneta School (Maracaibo, 1945–1946)
- El Hipódromo Development (Maracay, 1946)
- Las Delicias Neighborhood Unit (Maracay, 1948–1952)

=== 1950s ===
- San Martin Housing Development (Caracas, 1950)
- Hacienda La Pimpera House (Barlovento, 1954)
- Diego de Losada Development (Caracas, 1954)
- Atlántico Norte Development (Caracas, 1954–1955)
- Lomas de Pro Patria (Caracas, 1954)
- Cotiza Housing Estate (Caracas, 1954)
- Artigas Residential Estate (Caracas, 1954–1955)
- La Vega Residential Estate (Caracas, 1955)
- 23 de Enero Development (Caracas, 1955–1957)
- Simón Rodríguez Development (Caracas, 1956)
- Altos de Curia Residential Estate (Caracas, 1954)
- School of Petroleum Engineering (Maracaibo, 1956)

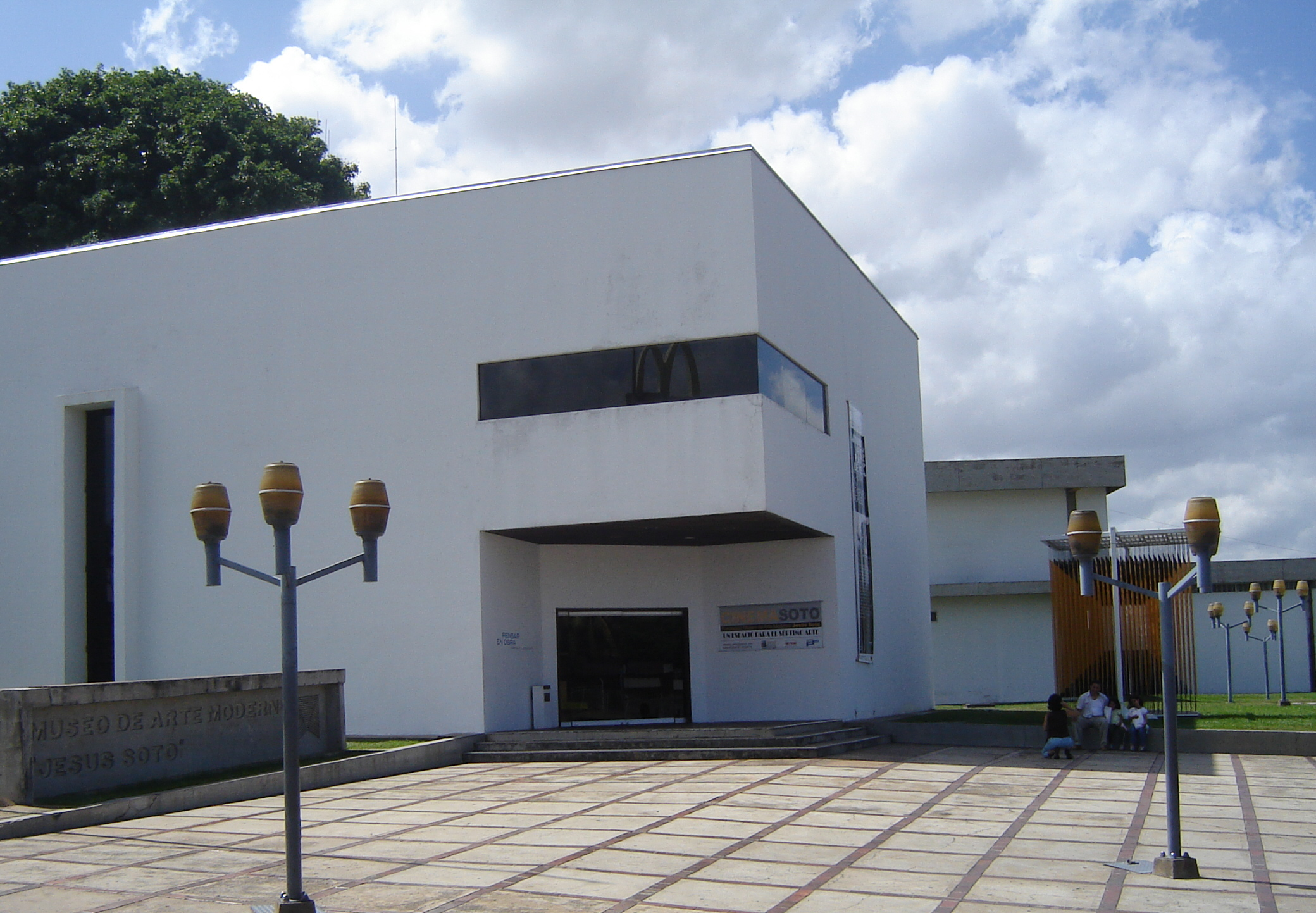
Jesús Soto Museum

=== 1960s ===
- La Salle Foundation (Caracas, 1961–1962)
- Caomita House (Caracas, 1962)
- House for Alejandro Otero (San Antonio de Los Altos, 1965)
- Plaza Estrella Building (Caracas, 1964)
- Venezuelan Pavilion for the Montreal Expo (Montreal, Canada, 1967)

=== 1970s ===
- Jesús Soto Museum (Ciudad Bolívar, 1970)
