= Pizzani =

Pizzani is a surname. Notable people with the surname include:

- Jorge Pizzani (born 1949), Venezuelan visual artist
- Juan Andrés Pizzani, Venezuelan poet, autobiographer, translator, and editor
