= Casa Bonita (disambiguation) =

Casa Bonita is a restaurant in Lakewood, Colorado, USA; the sole extant restaurant remaining in the chain.

Casa Bonita (Spanish: Nice House) may also refer to:

== Arts and entertainment ==
- "Casa Bonita", a 1988 art exhibition by Jorge Pizzani and Eduardo Marturet
- Casa Bonita, a 2007 album by Luthea Salom
- Casa Bonita, a game show on Multishow; see List of programs broadcast by Multishow
- "Casa Bonita" (South Park), a 2003 episode of the U.S. animated TV show South Park

== Other uses ==
- Casa Bonita Apartments, Berkeley, California, USA; listed as a Berkeley Landmark
- Casa Bonita, a U.S. theme restaurant fast casual restaurant chain owned by Uniq plc

== See also ==
- Bonita (disambiguation)
- Casa (disambiguation)
