= Los Caobos Park =

Public park in Caracas, Venezuela

- Parque Los Caobos
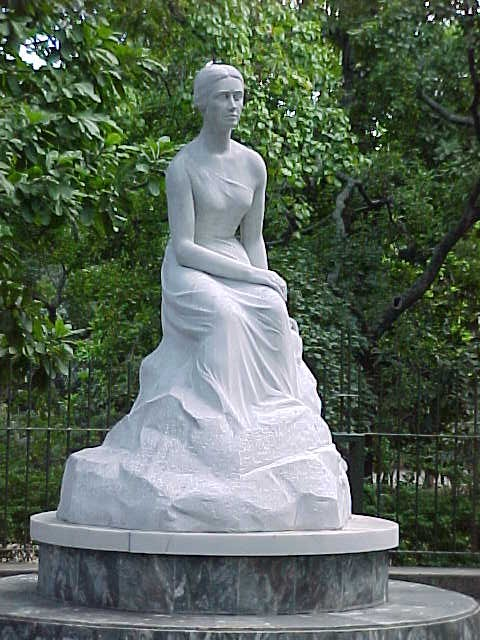
- Sculpture of Teresa de la Parra
- Interactive map of Los Caobos Park
- Location: Caracas, Capital District, Venezuela
- Area: 21.8 ha
- Created: 1920
- Manager: Libertador Municipality City Council
- Status: Open all year

The Caobos Park is one of the oldest parks of Caracas, Venezuela. Located near the Museum of Fine Arts, the Science Museum, the National Art Gallery, the National Experimental University of the Arts (formerly Caracas Athenaeum), the Teresa Carreño Cultural Complex and the Boulevard Amador Bendayan.

== History ==
The park was inaugurated in the year 1920 with the name of Sucre Park in honor of the national hero Mariscal Antonio José de Sucre in the grounds of the old hacienda "Industrial" owned by Don José Mosquera. Later in 1937 the City Council renames Los Caobos given the large number of big-leaf mahogany trees that existed on the site since the colonial era.

It place for one of the most important collections of ancient trees of Caracas. At the entrance of the park is the statue of Teresa de la Parra, by the sculptor Carmen Cecilia Knight Blanch. One of the most outstanding works of the park is the Fountain Venezuela by the Catalan architect Ernesto Maragall. The fountain is composed of various human figures representing the different regions of the country. This fountain was originally located in Plaza Venezuela until 1967.
