= Harry Abend =

Polish-born Venezuelan sculptor and artist (1937–2021)

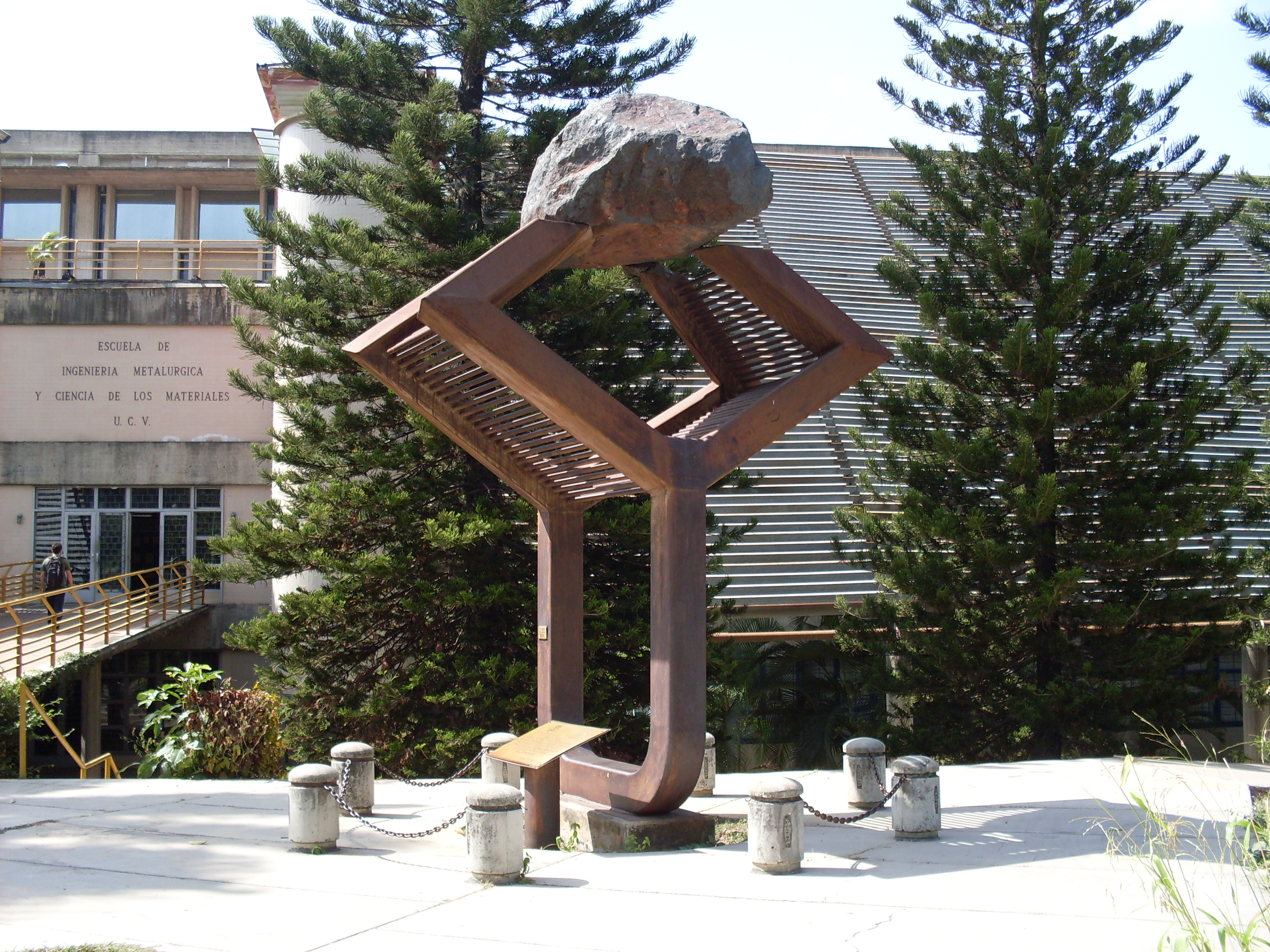
- Sculpture by Harry Abend (1954) at the Central University of Venezuela
- Born: 5 May 1937; Jarosław, Poland
- Died: 18 January 2021 (aged 83); Caracas, Venezuela
- Education: Universidad Central de Venezuela
- Occupations: Sculptor architect

Harry Abend, OFM (5 May 1937 – 18 January 2021) was a Polish-born Venezuelan sculptor and architect.

== Biography ==
With his parents, Polish Jews from Jarosław, he left Poland and immigrated to Venezuela at the age of 11 in 1948. Abend embarked on his sculpture practice in 1958 under the guidance of Miguel Arroyo while also studying architecture at the Universidad Central de Venezuela. In 1963, at the age of 26, Abend received the National Sculpture Prize of Venezuela for his work "Forma" 1961. In 1964, he participated in a three-month workshop led by British sculptor Kenneth Armitage. In 1976 Abend moved to London where he continued developing his work and exhibited in galleries such as the Roundhouse Gallery and the Hayward Gallery. Around this time Abend began to receive commissions to stage interventions in urban and architectural environments, such as the cement mural on the façade of the Teatro Teresa Carreño, and the interior design of the Sala Plenaria in the east tower of Parque Central, both in Caracas. A selection of his solo shows include Esculturas, Museo de Arte Moderno, Río de Janeiro (1968); three exhibitions at Sala Mendoza, Caracas (1973, 1980 and 1995); Electrum Gallery, London (1977); Saint James Piccadilly Festival, London (1981); a retrospective at the Museo de Arte Moderno Jesús Soto, Ciudad Bolívar (2002); Museo de Arte Acarigua Araure, Acarigua (2003); Museo Kern Unión Israelita de Caracas (2012); Galería GBG ARTS, Caracas and Henrique Faria, New York (both 2014). He lived and worked in Caracas.

== Work ==
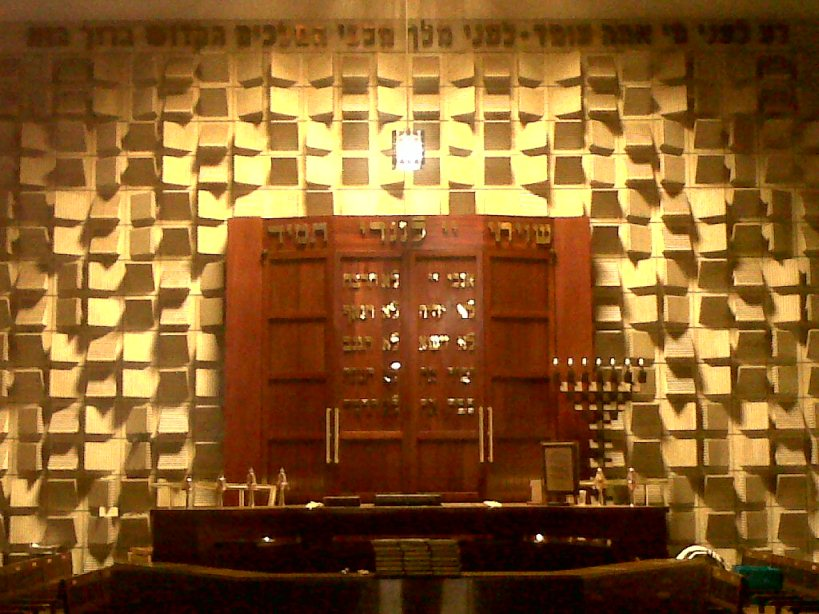
Heichal of the synagogue, designed by Harry Abend.

Between 1965 and 1970, Abend was the professor of tridimensional composition at the Neumann Institute of Design, where other renowned artists such as Gego, Gerd Leufert, Nedo, Manuel Quintana Castillo, Guillermo Meneses, and Luisa Zuloaga de Palacios taught similar courses. He established himself in London for six years, then returned to Caracas to continue his artistic work. In the next following decades, his style developed and matured as he engaged in numerous projects, installations, art exhibitions and collectives. Abend's sculptures are done mainly in wood, bronze, and concrete; he is also known for designing high-scale architectural elements of important buildings, such as the façade of the Teatro Teresa Carreño, the ceiling of the Caracas Israeli Union synagogue, and the new perimeter fence of the Court of Supreme Justice in Venezuela. Abend was a skilled engraver and illustrator; he also engaged in jewelry making, working primarily with gold, silver and precious gems. The elegant nature of his jewels is such that he was commissioned by the Venezuelan Government several times to craft pieces as gifts for important diplomatic personalities (e.g., he produced a complete jewelry set for Patricia Nixon while she was the First Lady of the United States).

His first solo exhibition (Museo de Bellas Artes, Caracas, 1962) included fused bronze pieces of polished surfaces and wooden sculptures. The works from one of his first series, Formas, earned him the Premio Nacional de Escultura (1963). Abend participated in the Taller de Quebrada Honda, organized on the occasion of British sculptor Kenneth Armitage's visit, and the works produced during the workshop were shown at the exhibition by Kenneth Armitage and eight Venezuelan sculptors (Museo de Bellas Artes, 1964). By that time, he had abandoned polished surfaces and made, for his second solo exhibition (Museo de Bellas Artes, 1965), bronze reliefs of abrupt geometric volumes and works influenced by Informalismo, in which his interest in the medium prevailed.

After this phase, Abend adhered to geometric constructivism, through which he developed reliefs integrated with architecture, as seen in several buildings in Caracas, including the Sinagoga de la Unión Israelita (1969), the Hotel Caracas Hilton (today Hotel Alba, 1973), the Sala Plenaria de Parque Central (1974), the Sinagoga de la Asociación Beth-El (1974–1975), and the Teatro Teresa Carreño (1980–1982). A selection of similar works, of smaller scale and made out of concrete, was displayed at the Sala Mendoza (Caracas, 1973). Between 1976 and 1982, Abend resided in London. Wood become his favored medium. He created different types of constructive-geometric assemblages, some by means of thick strips whose structural severity contrasted with their irregular reliefs, others combining small pieces arrayed in a rigorous and, at the same time, delicate order, and presented them in the exhibition Puertas, ventanas y relieves at the Sala Mendoza (1980).

After returning to Venezuela in the mid 1980s, Abend's work took on an organic character. At the outset, anthropomorphic and zoomorphic forms were suggested through wood pieces. Soon thereafter, the medium of wood and sculpting, as process, became the dynamic elements of his work. His large pieces looked like totems constructed of ovoid volumes with clear textures and placed on columns or beams that created the appearance of a megalith. These works were shown for the first time in the Museo de Bellas Artes (1989).

In later pieces, Abend used wood from trunks of trees that had been cut to make space for urban expansion. He cut these in cylindrical sections. He also recovered the trees' bark. These works, gathered in sculpture sets, were displayed at the Galería de Arte Nacional (Caracas, 1992) and the Sala Mendoza (1995). He also produced a series of conceptual works in which he placed leftover shavings of his woodwork in boxes, giving birth to a sort of "esculturas en negativo" (sculptures in negative).

== Exhibitions ==
Abend exhibited in numerous galleries, museums and art events around the world, some of which are:

- Museum of Fine Arts, Houston.
- Museum of Modern Art, Rio de Janeiro.
- Museum of Fine Arts, Venezuela.
- Museo Alejandro Otero, Venezuela.
- Jesus Soto Museum of Modern Art, Ciudad Bolivar.
- Museum of Contemporary Art Sofia Imber.
- National Art Gallery of Venezuela.
- Museum of Contemporary Art Francisco Narvaez, Porlamar, Nueva Sparta.
- Museum of Contemporary Art of Zulia.
- Biennial of Guayana.
- São Paulo Biennial.
- Salon D'Empaire, Maracaibo (Shell Award winner for sculpture).
- Henrique Faria Fine Art, New York.
- Goldsmith's Hall, London.
- Electrum Gallery, London.
- Roundhouse Gallery, London.
- Trasnocho Cultural Center.
- Jewelry Showcase: The Work of Harry Abend, Milwaukee.
- Kleinplastik Exhibition, Madurodam, The Hague (Prize winner).

== Recognitions ==
- 1963: Venezuelan National Award in Sculpture (Premio Nacional de Escultura) for the work "Forma 1961".
- 1990: Order of Francisco de Miranda, First Class

== Personal life ==
Harry Abend was married to Venezuelan virtuoso pianist and pedagogue Judit Jaimes, with whom he had two daughters, Blanca and Elena Abend. They divorced in 1982, and he later remarried.

== Literature ==
- Guevara, Roberto. "Construcción y naturaleza". In Harry Abend: Obras recientes, 1988–89. Caracas: Museo de Bellas Artes, 1989
- Guevara, Roberto. "Para encontrar el árbol". In Abend. Caracas: Galería de Arte Nacional, 1992
- Guevara, Roberto. Ver todos los días. Caracas: Monte Ávila Editores, 1981
- Harry Abend. 1970–2002. Ciudad Bolívar: Museo de Arte Moderno Jesús Soto, 2002
- Jiménez, Ariel. "Entrevista con Ariel Jiménez". In Esculturas y xilografías. Caracas: Sala Mendoza, 1995
- Mena, Marisa. Harry Abend. Colección Arte Venezolano, n° 56. Caracas: IARTES, 2008
- Palomero, Federica. Harry Abend: Obras recientes, 1988–89. Caracas: Museo de Bellas Artes, 1989
