= Gerd Leufert =

German Empire-born Venezuelan painter, photographer (1914–1998)

- Born: Gerhard Leufert; June 9, 1914; Memel, German Empire (present-day Klaipėda, Lithuania)
- Died: January 22, 1998; Caracas, Venezuela
- Education: Academy of Fine Arts, Munich
- Occupation(s): Painter, drawer, photographer, graphic designer, curator
- Movement: Abstract
- Partner: Gertrud Louise Goldschmidt (1952–1994; death)

Gerhard "Gerd" Leufert (1914 – 1998) was a German Empire-born Venezuelan painter, photographer, and graphic designer. He is credited with bringing German design principles to Venezuela in the 1950s.

== Early life and education ==
Gerhard "Gerd" Leufert was born in 1914, in Memel, German Empire (present-day Klaipėda, Lithuania).

He studied graphic design at the Academy of Fine Arts, Munich. He additionally studied under Fritz Helmuth Ehmcke, Walter Teutsch, and Friedrich Heubner. While in Munich he was a member of the Deutscher Werkbund, a craft association.

== Career ==
After World War II, he worked as a graphic designer for publishing houses such as Piper, Biederstein, Oldenburg, and Hansen. In 1947, he became the led at the graphic studio Bayrisches Bild in Munich, which was founded by Ehmcke. In 1951, he emigrated to Caracas, Venezuela, and obtained the position of an art director at the McCann Erickson advertising agency.

While in Venezuela, he met his future partner, Gego (née Gertrud Louise Goldschmidt). From 1953 to 1956, Leufert and Gego moved to the small mountain town of Tarma in Vargas State. In 1959 he traveled to the United States to pursue studies at the University of Iowa, and graphic design at the Pratt Institute in New York City.

Leufert worked at the Museo de Bellas Artes in Caracas, from 1961 to 1973. He was the museums first graphic designer, and later worked as their curator of drawings. As a painter, he was interested in abstract work.

== Awards ==
In 1965, Leufert won the National Prize for Painting in Venezuela, for his hard edge and graphic paintings. In 1990, he was awarded the National Prize of Plastic Arts of Venezuela, followed by an exhibition of his photographs at Sala RG, Caracas.

== Collections ==
His work can be found in museum collections, including at the Rhode Island School of Design Museum in Providence, Rhode Island; the Blanton Museum of Art in Austin, Texas; the Museum of Fine Arts, Houston in Houston, Texas; the Metropolitan Museum of Art in New York City; and the Museum of Modern Art in New York City.

== Exhibitions ==
- 1972, Conkright Gallery, New York City, New York, United States
- 1992, Museo de Arte Contemporáneo Mario Abreu, Maracay, Venezuela
- 1992, Centro Cultural Consolidado, Caracas, Venezuela
- 1994–1995, Museo de Bellas Artes, Caracas, Venezuela
