= Jorge Pizzani =

Venezuelan visual artist (born 1949)

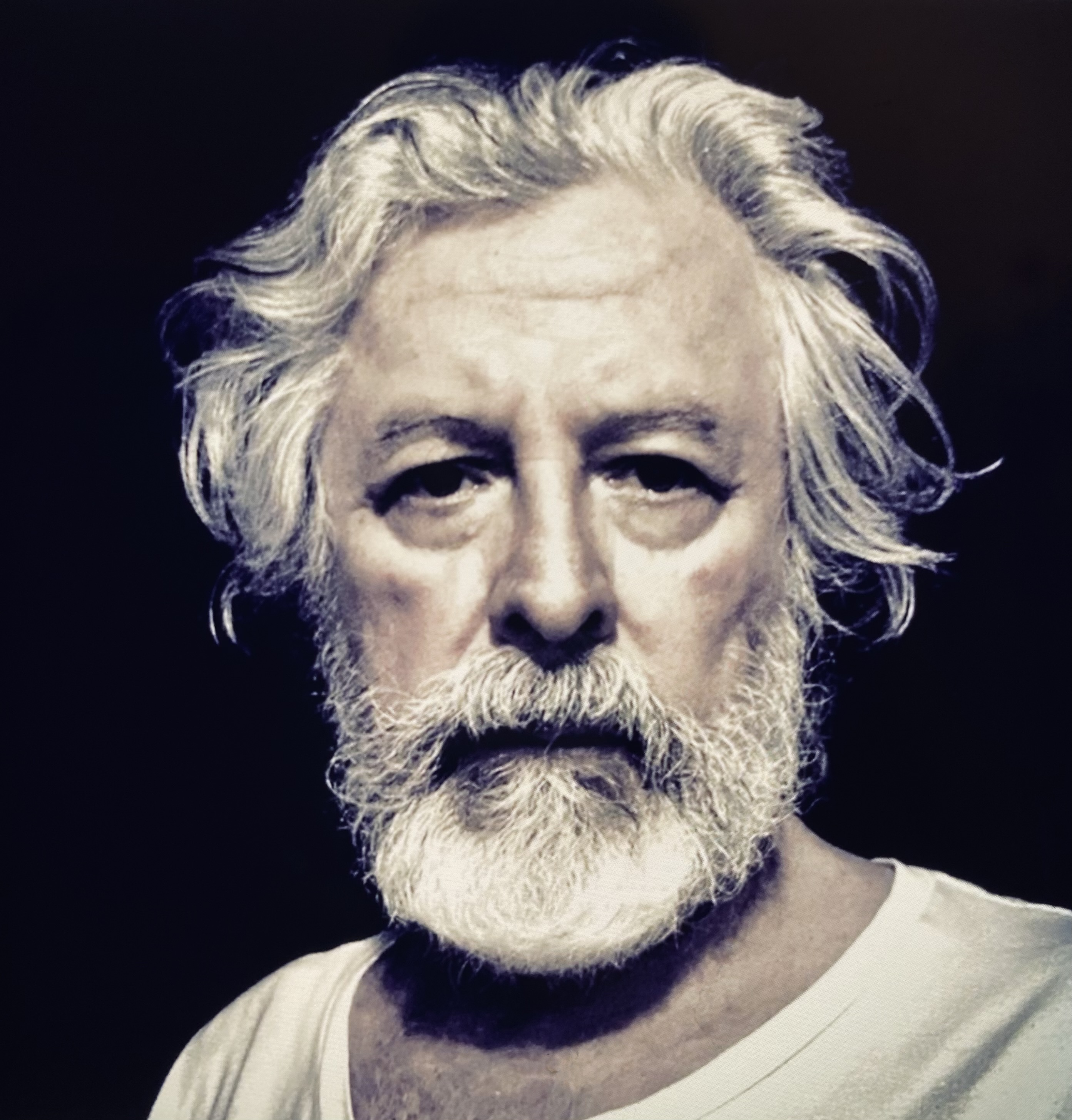
- Portrait of Jorge Pizzani
- Born: Jorge Eliezer Pizzani Campins; 14 October 1949 (age 76); Acarigua, Venezuela
- Education: Instituto de Diseño Fundación Neumann, Caracas
- Known for: painting, contemporary art, sculpture
- Website: jorgepizzani.wixsite.com/website

Jorge Pizzani (born on 14 October 1949) is a Venezuelan visual artist. He currently works in Caracas and Turgua. He studied at Instituto de Diseño Fundación Neumann, Caracas. He spent working seasons in Paris and Barcelona. He is considered as one of the most important artists of contemporary Venezuelan art.

== Early life and education ==
Pizzani was born in Acarigua, Venezuela. At the age of 20, Pizzani arrived in Caracas from the rural town of Acarigua, and began studying at the Instituto de Diseño Fundación Neumann, where he graduated in 1973. He was a student of Gego, Manuel Espinoza and Abilio Padrón.

== Career ==
=== 1970 - 1980 ===
Between 1973 and 1975, he was part of grupo Quadrum, with Leonor Arráiz, Orlando Aponte and Manuel Espinoza. He worked as a graphic designer - notably for the avant-garde magazine Imagen - and also taught drawing at IDD whilst pursuing his career as an artist.

He held his first solo exhibition in 1973, and since then has taken part in several group shows, in those days mostly with works on paper. The exhibitions include Museo de Bellas Artes (Caracas), Salón Arturo Michelena, Galería Viva México, Sala Mendoza, Ángel Boscán Gallery and Universidad Simón Bolívar, all in Caracas.

Pizzani also exhibited throughout the country, notably in Casa de la Cultura Acarigua-Araure and in University of the Andes (Venezuela) in Mérida. Abroad, he represented Venezuela at the Poster Biennial in Warsaw, in 1978 and 1980.

He lived in Barcelona (Spain) for a year and a half in 1980. That year, he exhibited at the Museo de Arte Contemporáneo de Caracas (Caracas Museum of Contemporary Art) where he won the Ernesto Avellán Salon Prize, and his work entered the collection of the Galería de Arte Nacional National Art Gallery (Caracas). He exhibited in Barcelona at the Joan Miró Salon and in Paris at the Espace Latino-Américain.

=== 1980 - 1990 ===
In 1981, he settled in Paris, where he would live until 1987. In the early eighties, he took part in various exhibitions in Paris, some of which with fellow Venezuelan artists abroad, like Pancho Quilici and Milton Becerra. Worth mentioning the international travelling exhibition "Sechs Junge Kunstier aus Venezuela", seen in Berlin, Brussels and Paris, which included Milton Becerra. He did this whilst keeping presence in his native country, as show his participation in the National Salon of Young Artists, the II Biennial of Visual Arts at Museo de Arte Contemporáneo de Caracas (Caracas Museum of Contemporary Art) and Sala CANTV. In 1984, he exhibited in Sala Mendoza a selection of eight large-format works made in his early years in Paris, and he participated in the collective action "Intervention in Venice" which included, among others, Leonor Arráiz, Luis Ángel Duque, Rafael Barrios and Milton Becerra.

"Jorge Pizzani brought the theme of the landscape and geography into dynamic pictorial summits. Pizzani is the prototypical artist of that generation who showed a certain desperation to paint. The agony with which this artist represents over and over his landscapes, in a violent decomposition, contains in itself the sense of urgency with which the exhibitions in Sala Mendoza followed one another during those heroic years. Urgency to conquer a more dynamic space in Venezuelan art, and urgency to define new content, directions and expressive formats." Pizzani exhibited in many group shows as well as in a memorable solo exhibition in 1985 in Sala Mendoza. Axel Stein, its director back then, recalls: "Pizzani sees himself as a son of Armando Reverón. Like him, he lived in a hut. He even represented Reveron's father in the film by Diego Rísquez. Pizanni´s landscapes were never descriptive, rather they represented a state of mind, a desire to take the gesture of the body to new dimensions. Landscape as a metaphor for the artist who reaches and understands everything had its climax, as we can see in the mural painted directly on the walls of the Hall in 1985."

In 1985, Pizzani traveled to Brazil as part of the Venezuelan representation at the 18th Bienal de São Paulo. During 1986, he installed "Anamorfosis" in Galería Sotavento, Caracas. That same year he obtained the Picasso Prize for Painting in Nice, France, and participated in the traveling exhibition "40 years, 40 artists, 40 paintings" at the UNESCO headquarters in Paris.

After six years in Europe, he returned to Venezuela in May 1987 and settled in the churuata that filmmaker Diego Rísquez made for one of his films, Bolívar Sinfonía Tropikal. He produced works that were later presented at Galería Sotavento, Caracas, and later, again together with Leonor Arráiz, Rafael Barrios, Luis Ángel Duque and Milton Becerra, they produced “The Conquest of Space”, an installation projected at the Halle K-18 in Kassel (Germany), as part of the Documenta 8. As the group stated in the synopsis presented regarding said work, "this intervention is our version of one of the strongest icons of Virgin America and its symbolic environment." In 1988, at Museo de Arte Contemporáneo de Caracas (Caracas Museum of Contemporary Art), he was part of another groundbreaking show, “Casa bonita”, three large-scale settings that symbolise the common spaces of a house. The lounge was developed by Rafael Barrios, the patio by Marcos Salazar and the bar, by Pizzani.

=== 1990 - 2000 ===
In 1989 he devoted himself to the in-depth study of new scientific theories about the configuration of the universe and integrated them into his pictorial work. In the early nineties he took part in several shows at Galería de Arte Nacional National Art Gallery (Caracas), including “Circular Horizons” in 1990, a survey of the eighties and “Venezuela. New cartographies and cosmogony”. In fact, one of Pizzani's works belonging to the GAN collection, was part of the Venezuelan representation at the Arts Pavilion in the Universal Seville Expo '92 in Spain, in a show entitled "Thirty years of contemporary art (1960-1960)". During 1993, Pizzani ventured into metals, specifically iron and its different transformations in the oxidation process, and introduced them into his new works, which he exhibited in Sala Mendoza amongst other places.

In 1996, his series of autobiographical drawings, “Instructions to direct the course of nausea”, was exhibited at Venezuela's Galería de Arte Nacional National Art Gallery (Caracas). In November of that year, the biographical book "Jorge Pizzani, demiurge of the organic" was published, with texts by Enrique Viloria, who writes "Pizzani with his unprejudiced plastic proposal faces a logic of the human, a conception of the living, marked by symmetry and difference that divides the world into kingdoms, in extracts, in biological sects, in genetic castes that individualize and distinguish, exclude and classify". Many shows included two solos at Sala Mendoza, and Museo de Arte Contemporáneo de Caracas (Caracas Museum of Contemporary Art), and participation in the first Bienal do Mercosul, in Porto Alegre, Brasil in 1997, curated by Federico Morais.

In the mid-nineties he moved from Risquez Churuata to a house in the beautiful landscapes of Turgua, near Caracas. From there, he has witnessed the decline that Venezuela has lived since the militarist coup in the 1990s.

=== 2000 to the present ===
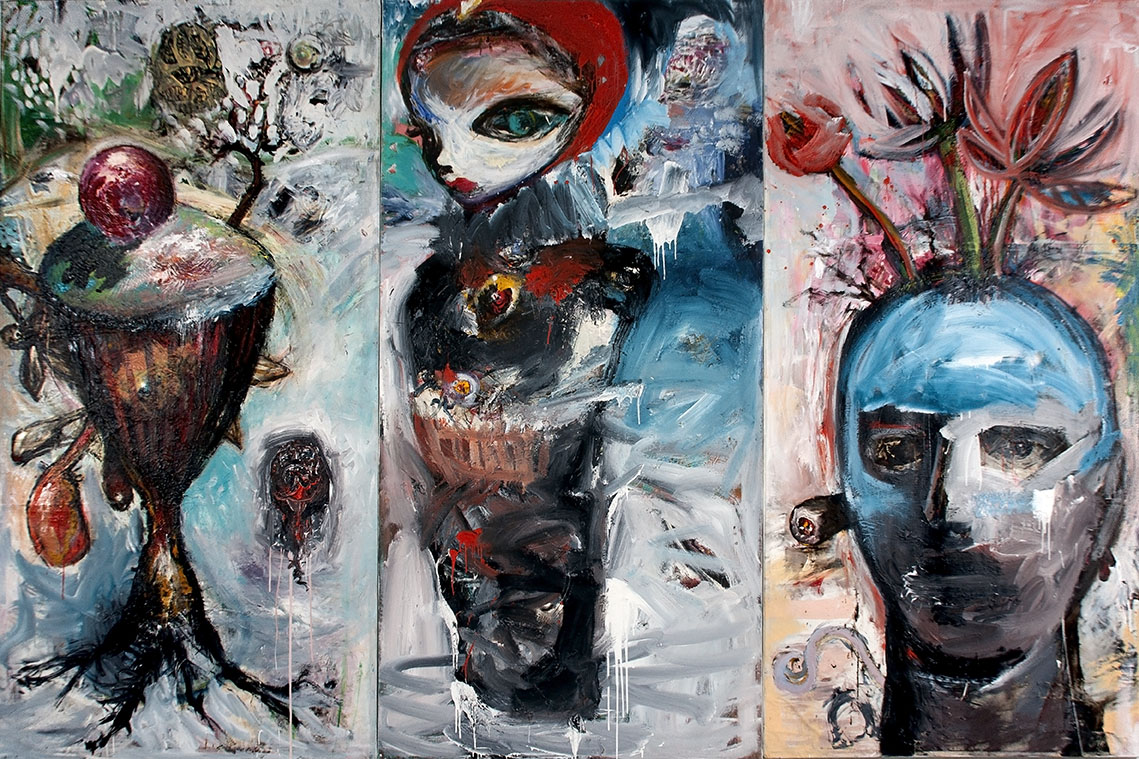
Caperucita Roja

The downfall of Venezuela since the arrival of the Chavista "revolution" shows its trails of destruction in the country, in the economy of Venezuela and has also left marks in his painting ever since. The anonymous faces that spoke about beauty, as seen often in his paintings of the previous decade, are now often depicted having to fight monsters that want to destroy such beauty, monsters that are not exclusive to Venezuelan reality but that can be seen everywhere today with a role in the decline of the world. Pizzani’s focus, however, remains in the painting process and the faith in the process itself as a way into knowledge and salvation.

The beginning of the 21st Century brought in many solo shows for Pizzani, such as “Tejido vivo” at Galería de Arte Nacional National Art Gallery (Caracas), “Demencia Local” and “La noche escura” at Galería Fernando Zubillaga, Caracas, and “Kannibal Nature” at Löwenpalais, Berlin. A great number of important solo shows include Colección Mercantil, Caracas, Galería Solar, New York, and Galería D´Museo, Caracas.

In recent years, he had a solo exhibition of recent works entitled “Corte Masivo” in 2016 at sala TAC, Caracas, and “Materia Radical” at Spazio Zero in Caracas, 2019.

== Works in public collections ==
- Banco Mercantil, Caracas;
- Fundación Noa Noa, Caracas;
- Galería Municipal de Arte, Puerto La Cruz;
- Galería de Arte Nacional National Art Gallery (Caracas), GAN;
- Museo de Arte Contemporáneo de Caracas (Caracas Museum of Contemporary Art), MACCSI;
- Museo de Bellas Artes (Caracas) MBA, Caracas.

== Other Resources ==
=== Video ===
- "Material Radical" Galería Spazio Cero, 2020. Video.
- "Acción pública" part of the exhibition by Jorge Pizzani entitled Tejido vivo at GAN, Caracas Venezuela, 2005. Video.
- "Kanibal Nature Berlin". Video.
- "Una mañana con Jorge Pizzani" by Cesar Cortéz. Video.
- Pizzani appears in the movie as himself.

=== Magazine articles ===
- Lansberg, Caresse, "Jorge Pizzani en su taller", Revista Estilo, Caracas, 2019.
- Luis Ángel Duque, Luis Ángel. "Horizontes Circulares". In the library of the Museum of Fine Arts, Houston.
- Flores León-Marquez, Carlos. "Jorge Pizzani, La oscuridad que pinta con los dedos". El Estímulo, 2016

=== Books ===
- Tuchman, Phyllis, "Venezuela : The Next Generation : 9 Painters", Baruch College Gallery, New York, 1990
- VVAA, "ALTER EGO, LECTURAS DEL RETRATO" Colección Mercantil, Editorial La Galaxia, Caracas 2013
- Viloria Vera, Enrique, "Jorge Pizzani: demiurgo de lo orgánico". Museo de Arte Acarigua-Araure, 1993
