= Abigail Varela =

Venezuelan artist (b. 1948)

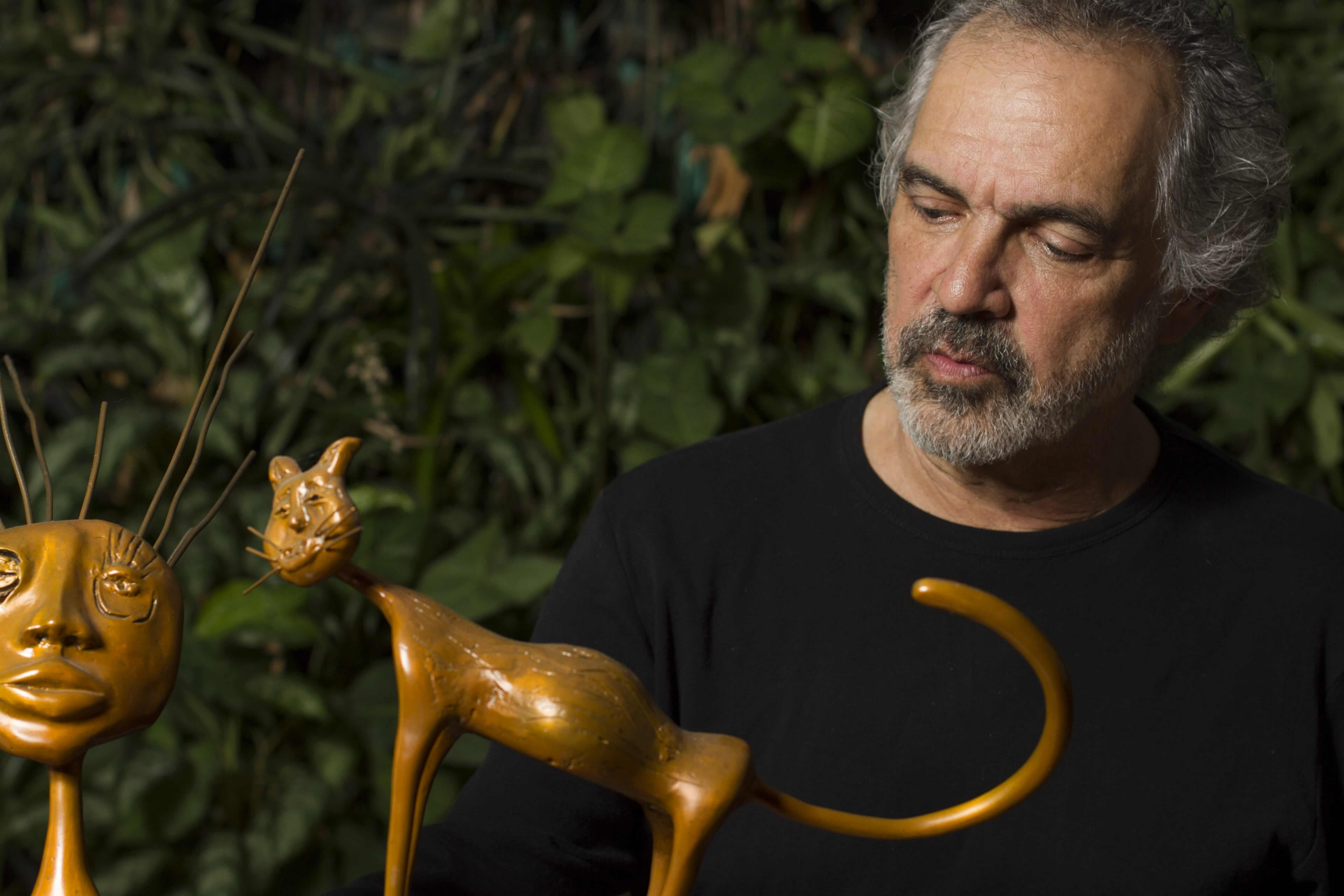
- 2014
- Born: 9 February 1948 (age 78); Caracas, Venezuela
- Known for: Sculpture, drawing

Abigail Varela (born February 9, 1948) is a Venezuelan visual artist. He is best known for bronze sculptures representing pre-Columbian of abstract feminine figures interpreted in modern style in poses that suggest motion.

== Career ==
Varela began his art education under Japanese ceramist Hiroshi Kawagiri followed by courses at art schools in Caracas. Varela produces flat silhouetted large sculptures, evolving into classic cast bronzes with a polished dark finish. Other works are made in solid aluminum. Varela's favorite theme is feminity in bulky shapes that somehow manage to suggest lightness and movement. His shapes have been likened to those of the Venus of Willendorf. A touch of humor inhabits many of Varela's sculptures.

== Achievements ==
Varela's art is noted in Venezuela and beyond. His work has been exhibited in New York (Katharina Rich Perlow Gallery), London (Cynthia Bourne Gallery), San Salvador (Galería Espacio), Coral Gables (Galería Freites-Revilla) and Boca Raton (Elaine Baker Gallery) among other places. A retrospective of Varela's art was presented at the BOD Center in Caracas in 2014. In 2018 his work was chosen (among 22 pieces) for exhibition at the CAF gallery (Caracas) representing Times and Trends in Latin American Sculpture. His art has been reviewed in essays and books. His pieces occupy the art collections of Venezuelan institutions such as the National Art Gallery (Caracas), Contemporary Art Museum, Empresas Polar Foundation and Fundación Cultural Chacao. It is found in open-air art museums in Venezuelan locations (Mérida, Valencia, Aroa and Margarita Island) as well as in Huelva (Spain) and at the Suncheon Bay National Garden, Korea.

== Recognition ==
In 2014 Varela was awarded the Omar Carreño Prize for Plastic Arts offered jointly by the Venezuelan Architects Association and the National Association of Plastic Artists.

Varela's name is listed in established artist directories including ULAN, Artnet, Christie's, Benezit, in Marta Traba's Art of Latin America and in Leonard's Price Index of Latin American Art.
