= Gego =

Venezuelan artist, sculptor (1912–1994)

- Born: Gertrud Louise Goldschmidt; 1 August 1912; Hamburg, Germany
- Died: 17 September 1994 (aged 82); Caracas, Venezuela
- Education: Technische Hochschule of Stuttgart, Germany
- Known for: Sculptor, Architect, Printmaker
- Notable work: Reticulárea
- Movement: Modern Art
- Awards: Premio Nacional de Artes Plasticas
- Website: gegoartista.com

Gertrud Louise Goldschmidt (1 August 1912 – 17 September 1994), known as Gego, was a modern German-Venezuelan visual artist. Gego is perhaps best known for her geometric and kinetic sculptures made in the 1960s and 1970s, which she described as "drawings without paper".

== Early life ==
Gertrud Louise Goldschmidt, who went by "Gego", was born on 1 August 1912 in Hamburg, Germany into a Jewish family. She was the sixth of seven children of Eduard Martin Goldschmidt and Elizabeth Hanne Adeline Dehn. Although she was the niece of the medieval art historian Adolf Goldschmidt, who taught at the University of Berlin, she decided to attend the Technische Hochschule of Stuttgart in 1932, where she was taught by the well-known German architect Paul Bonatz. In 1938, she earned a diploma in both architecture and engineering.

Because her family was Jewish, life became very difficult once the Nazis gained power in 1933. Her German citizenship was nullified in 1935, and she was forced to leave the country. She found work in 1939 in Venezuela as an architect and gained Venezuelan citizenship in 1952. Her parents and siblings all managed to leave Germany by June 1940 mostly settling in England and California. Some close relatives chose to stay in Germany unaware they would soon be murdered.

In 1987, Professor Frithjof Trapp of the University of Hamburg led an investigation called "Exile and Emigration of Hamburg Jews," which he hoped would explain the lives of these Jews. Gego was one person whom he hoped to investigate. After several letters to her home, she finally agreed to respond but the letter was never mailed and instead stayed in her collection of notes. In her testimony, "Reflection on my origins and encounters in life," Gego described how her family identified with German society. She described, in detail, her education history and her departure from Germany.

== Importance of education ==
After moving to Caracas, Venezuela, Gego taught at the College of Architecture and City Planning at the Central University of Venezuela between 1958 and 1967. Additionally, between 1964 and 1977, she taught at the Neumann Institute of Design, an institution where many other well-known artists, such as Harry Abend, a fellow European-born artist, also taught. Gego taught "Bidimensional and Three-Dimensional Form" and "Spatial Solutions" and published two articles between 1971 and 1977.

In 1948, Venezuelan president Rómulo Gallegos was overthrown by a military coup. Gego knew that, after a time of crisis, students become the members of society that are the most influential. Included in her Sabiduras, a folder of her informal writings discovered upon her death, there is a letter addressed to her colleagues explaining the criteria that would be beneficial to the students of Venezuela. In it, she explains that only through experience can artists, and architects in particular, learn their medium: Images and theories about architecture would not further their artistic training. Her views were fueled by her belief that students were taught with too much emphasis on rationality and were becoming "ignorant of imagination."

== Career ==
=== Background ===
Arriving in Venezuela during an economic boom, Gego was surrounded by artists enjoying a great deal of success. Modernism was the artistic fad sweeping through Latin America and artists in Venezuela participated enthusiastically. Modernism was a political tool as well. Latin American governments were trying to catch up to the advancements of the United States during the post―World War II era, and Venezuela thought by encouraging the modern art movement, which incorporated ideas of the industry, science, and architecture, the country would be seen as progressive.

Gego made her first sculpture in 1957. She was aware of the modern movement when she came to Caracas, but she did not want to simply co-opt the ideas of Kinetic Art, Constructivism or Geometric Abstraction. Instead, Gego wanted to create a style of her own because she was able to use so many aspects of her life in her art—for example, her German heritage. In the end, she saw that these new projects labeled desarrollista (developmentalist movement) were pleasing the elite and members of government, but she wanted an art that would relate to the local community of Venezuela.

=== Line ===
From Kinetic Art, Gego incorporated motion as well as the importance of experimentation and the spectator. One of her earliest works, Esfera (Sphere) (1959), consists of welded brass and painted steel of different widths that are placed at different angles to one another in order to create overlapping lines and fields. When the viewer walks around the sphere, the visual relationship between the lines changes, creating a sense of motion. Esfera echoes the work done by famous Kinetic artists like Carlos Cruz-Diez and Jesus Rafael Soto. It was not until the mid-1960s that Gego departed from the basic concept of Kinetic Art in response to her developing ideas about lines. For her, a line inhabited its own space, and as such, it was not a component in a larger work but instead it was a work in itself. Therefore, in her artworks, she did not use line to represent an image; line was the image.

The strength or purpose of a line was enhanced by Gego's use of different materials, like steel, wire, lead, nylon and various metals. In addition to relating to her interest in architecture, these materials also contradicted the new modernist movement in Latin America. Gego not only used these materials to create lines in her massive sculptures but also in her series entitled Dibujos Sin Papel (Drawings without Paper). These small works were created from scraps of metal that were bent and weaved together in order to evoke movement, experimentation, and spontaneity.

While in Los Angeles in the late 1960s, Gego composed a series of lithographs that were mostly untitled except for a ten-page book entitled, Lines in 1966. This book was produced in gray and red. Variations in the thickness, length, and direction of the lines demonstrate the fundamental instability of lines. By experimenting with line in a different medium, Gego emphasized that the notion of a "line" retains its strength and independence regardless of its specific location or form.

=== Space ===
Gego's idea of a series of artworks that would be titled "Drawings Without Paper" reflected on her view of space. She considered space as its own form; as if her artwork was occupying the artwork of the room itself. Since her work is made from nets and grid-like materials, negative space is everywhere, creating an appreciation of both the negative as well as the positive space. But it is the shadows created by her works that reveal the integral connection between the sculpture and the room it occupies. In Gego's work, she was thus allowed to play with the idea of the stable and unstable elements of art: The stable elements of art is the sculpture itself, while the unstable elements consist of the constantly changing shadows and the slight movement in her design due to the fragility of her materials. In fact, the way Gego's sculptures exist in space changes every time it was installed because she had the power to recreate the image as she wanted.

=== Tamarind Lithography Workshop ===
On the invitation of June Wayne, Gego briefly visited Tamarind Lithography Workshop in Los Angeles (now Tamarind Institute) in 1963 and returned as an artist-fellow from November to December 1966, during which time she created thirty-one lithographs, including two books of them.

Gego explained her interest in using non-traditional formats in her printmaking in a speech at Tamarind in 1966: "I think that series of sheets with a coherent meaning must be gathered in a way that they can be easily enjoyed so I make books."

As in her three-dimensional installations, Gego used printmaking as a mode of linear experimentation. She used line, and its infinite variations, to explore negative space, or what she called, the "nothing between the lines." At a reception honoring her at Tamarind in 1966 she explained, "I discovered that sometimes the in-between lines is as important as the lines by [themselves]."

== Reticulárea ==
Her series of Reticuláreas is undoubtedly her most popular and most talked about group of artworks. Her first series was created in 1969. Pieces of aluminum and steel were joined together to create an interweaving of nets and webs that fills the entire room when exhibited. Her use of repetition and layering in the massive structure causes the piece to seem endless. Since her death, the permanent collection of Reticuláreas is in the Galería de Arte Nacional in Caracas, Venezuela.

== Personal life ==
In 1940 Gego met Venezuelan urban planner Ernst Gunz at the architectural firm where she worked with other architects to design the Los Caobos housing estate for Luis Roche. They married in October 1940 and opened a furniture studio called ‘Gunz’, where Gego designed lamps and wooden furniture. Together the couple had Tomás (b. 1942) and Barbara (b. 1944). Gego closed Gunz in 1944 in order to spend more time with her children. By 1948 she returned to designing private homes, nightclubs, and restaurants.

In 1951 she separated from Gunz, and in 1952 met artist and graphic designer Gerd Leufert. Gego and Leufert remained partnered for the rest of her life. The romantic partnership coincides with the development of her artistic career: She began exhibiting her watercolors, collages, and monotypes in 1954 and by 1956 was experimenting with creating three-dimensional objects.

== Death and legacy ==
Gego died on 17 September 1994 in Caracas, Venezuela. That same year, her family founded the Fundación Gego to preserve her artistic legacy; it organizes posthumous exhibitions of her artwork and promotes awareness of Gego's significance to the art world. The Fundación Gego gave the permission to publish Gego's personal writings and testimonies in 2005. These writings, now published, may influence other artists in her innovative and experimental mode of sculpture.

Gego's work is in the Museum of Modern Art. Her work was included in the 2021 exhibition Women in Abstraction at the Centre Pompidou.

== See also ==
- National Prize of Plastic Arts of Venezuela
