= Pájaro (artist) =

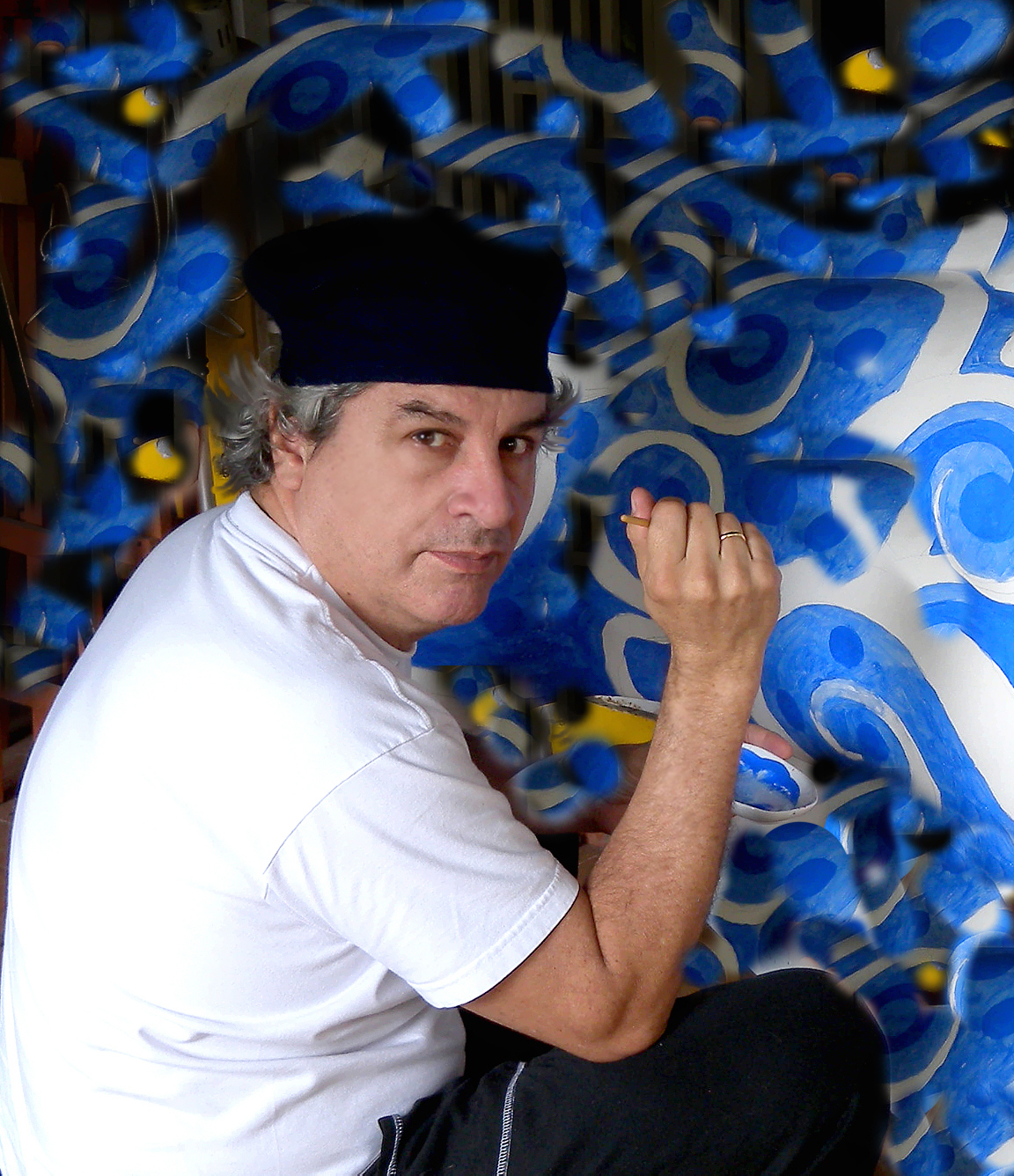
- Pájaro
- Born: Juan Vicente Gómez Landaeta; April 4, 1952 (age 74); Caracas, Venezuela
- Known for: Painting
- Movement: Surrealism, Figurative art, Expressionism

Juan Vicente Gómez Landaeta, better known as Pájaro, is a Venezuelan painter whose work has reached from figurative painting to expressionism and surrealism.

== Biography ==
Grandson of the well-known General Juan Vicente Gomez, Pájaro was born in 1952 in Caracas, Venezuela to conservative parents Juan Vicente Gómez and Emma Landaeta. He lived the majority of his childhood and adolescence in Madrid, Spain. At the age of 23 he began to experiment as a self-taught painter. At the age of 25 he won a scholarship in order to study graphic arts, photography, and sculpture in Washington, D.C. After 4 years, he returned to Caracas, where he lives now.

== Work ==
When he returned to Venezuela, he brought with him the influence of medieval, Renaissance, and Baroque Europe, which he expresses in a mixture of styles, creating a realism which is referred to as "Metarealism". Pájaro bases himself in the aspects of classical art that he chooses and mixes at will. From the Renaissance he borrows clothing fashions; he also borrows a little of the Baroque and even takes the sensibility of Modern painting. It is also common in his landscapes to find details of the intricate and false atmospheric perspective from medieval painting. His themes are juxtapositions of dreamlike figures, objects, times, and places. These are generally painted with a spectrum of carefully controlled muted colors, but sometimes highly chromatic passages are applied. Pá.

== Awards ==
2012: Primer Premio "PRIMER SALON DEL PAISAJE". Galería de Arte Nacional. Caracas. Venezuela.

2013: Mención Honorifica "Primer Salón Creación de León Castro". Caracas. Venezuela.
