= Teresa Carreño Cultural Complex =

Opera house in Caracas, Venezuela

- Complejo Cultural Teresa Carreño
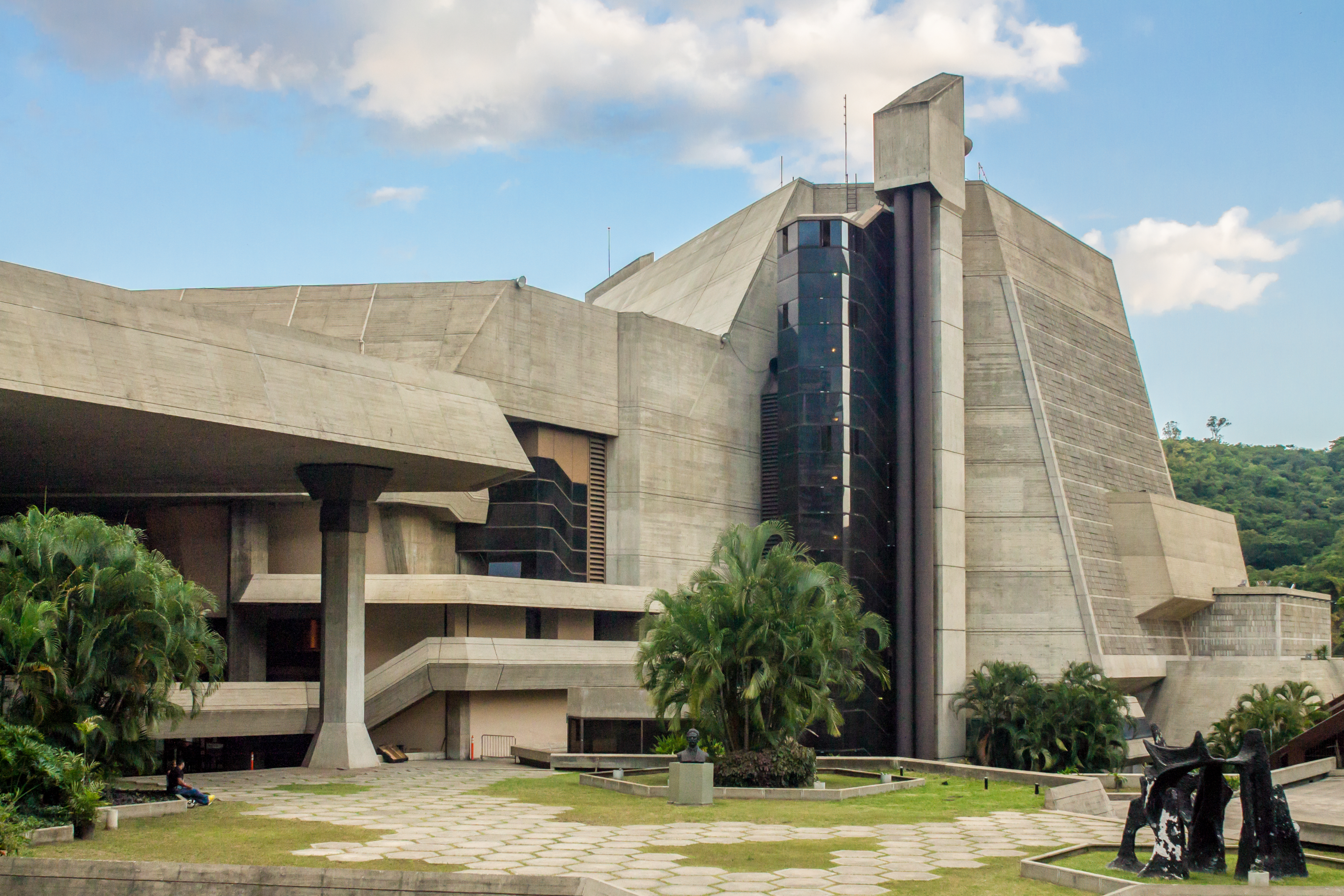
- Interactive map of the Teresa Carreño Cultural Complex area

General information
- Architectural style: Brutalist
- Location: Caracas, Venezuela
- Coordinates: 10.4990°N 66.8978°W
- Opened: April 19, 1983

Design and construction
- Architects: Tomás Lugo Marcano, Jesús Sandoval and Dietrich Kunckel

Other information
- Seating capacity: 2900

Website
- www.teatroteresacarreno.gob.ve

The Teresa Carreño Cultural Complex (Complejo Cultural Teresa Carreño), also known as Teresa Carreño Theatre (Teatro Teresa Carreño), is the most important theatre of Caracas and Venezuela, where performances include symphonic and popular concerts, opera, ballet and plays. It is the second largest theater in South America after the Néstor Kirchner Cultural Centre at Buenos Aires.

The theatre was built on a 22,000-square-metre (240,000 sq ft) lot and named after the Venezuelan pianist Teresa Carreño. It is located in the cultural district of the city: Bellas Artes. It houses two concert halls: the José Félix Ribas and the Ríos Reyna (named after José Félix Ribas and Pedro Antonio Ríos Reyna, respectively).

Its spaces are also shared by the National Theater Company of Venezuela and the Monte Ávila Editores bookstore (Librerías del Sur).

The artistic director of the theater is the Venezuelan conductor Rodolfo Saglimbeni.

== History ==
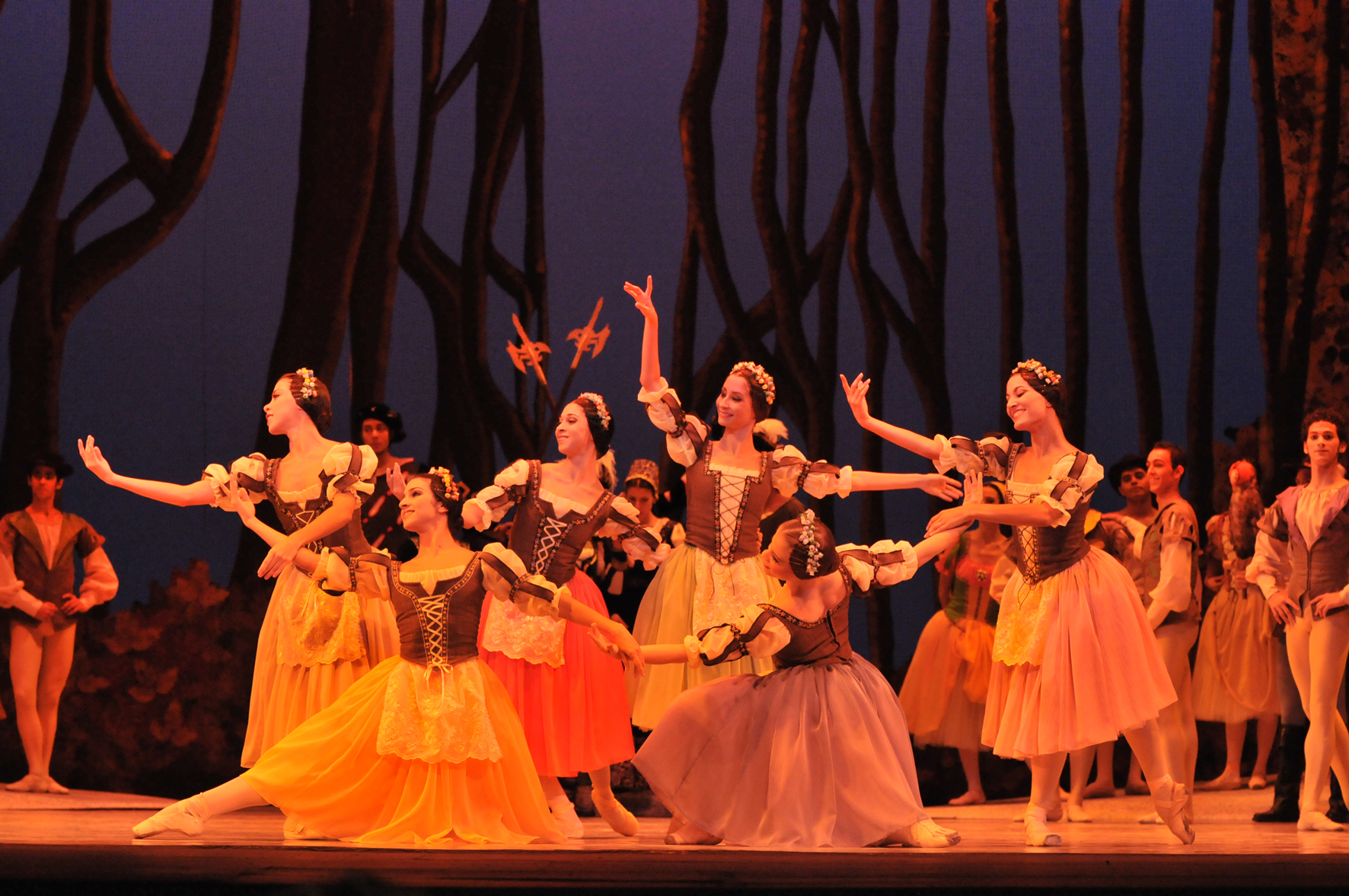
Ballet Giselle, directed by the Prima Ballerina Assoluta Alicia Alonso

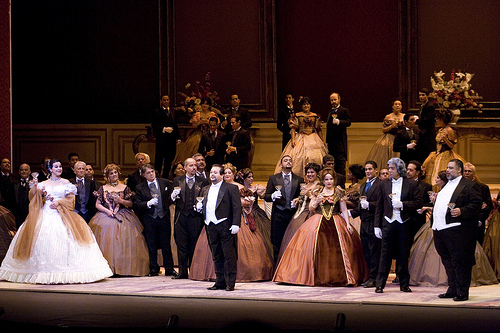
La Traviata, 2008

In the 1970s, Pedro Antonio Ríos Reyna presented a plan to build a theatre to serve as the residence of the Venezuela Symphony Orchestra. The Simón Bolivar Center expanded the project so that the center would serve multiple uses.

The funds for construction were granted in September 1970, and the architects were Dietrich Kunckel, Tomás Lugo, and Jesús Sandoval.

The theatre was inaugurated in two phases: the José Félix Ribas Hall in February 1976, followed by the Ríos Reyna Hall and the rest of the complex on 19 April 1983.

The center facilities have been expanded with two exhibition halls, one dedicated to the pianist Teresa Carreño and another one to the composer Reynaldo Hahn.

== Resident groups ==
The following are resident performing arts groups:

- Teresa Carreño Opera Choir
- Teresa Carreño Ballet directed up to 2002 by choreographer Vicente Nebrada
- National Philharmonic Orchestra of Venezuela.

== Performance venues ==
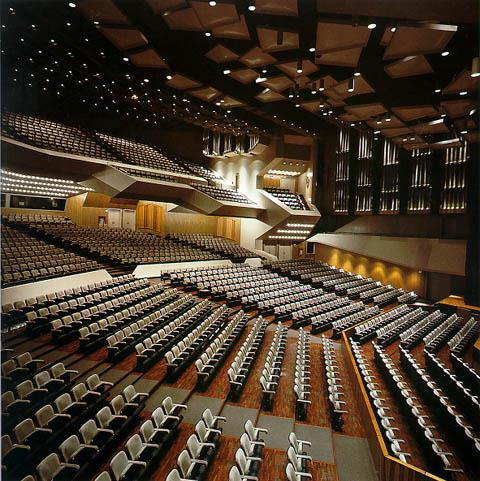
Ríos Reyna Hall

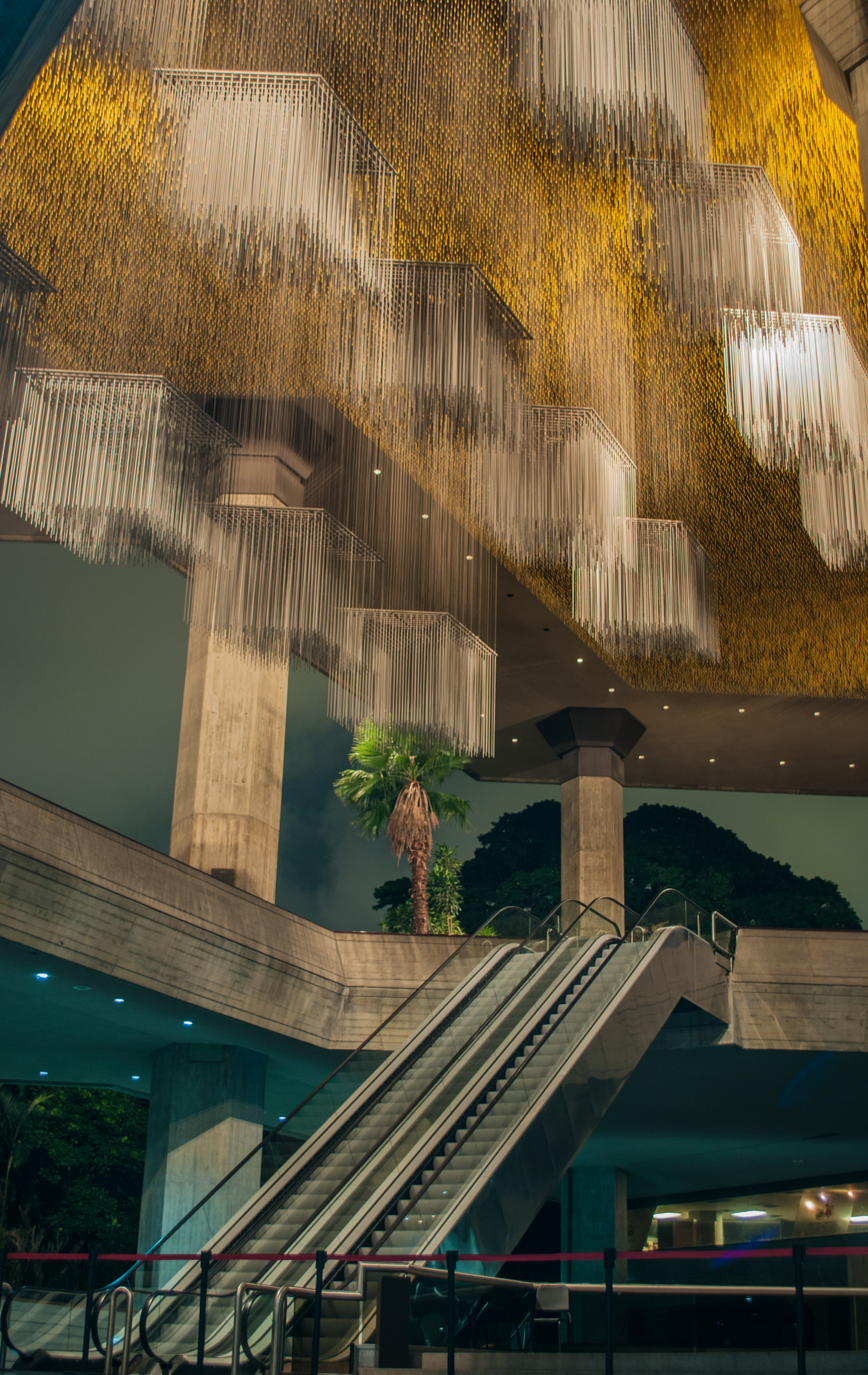
Foyer ceiling by Jesús Soto

The Teresa Carreño Theatre is an architectonical and cultural masterpiece of Venezuela. It covers a surface of 22,586 m^{2} (243,110 sq ft) and has a completed area of over 80,000 m^{2} (860,000 sq ft).

Enormous columns and hexagonal roofs in a harmonic overlaid position, integrate the majestic expression of joint architecture and pluralist nature, making it a unique theatre.

- The Ríos Reyna Hall holds 2,400 people. It is the stage for symphonic and multi-genre concerts, operas, Broadway musicals, and the most important ballet company of the city.
- The José Félix Ribas Hall was designed for symphonic and chamber music. Given its intimacy, it could be described as a studio space. It takes the form of a Greek semicircular theatre, a space of 507.5 square meters, a lobby of 160 square meters and capacity for 440 people, making it an ideal venue for chamber music, duos and solo instrument concerts. It was the official building of the Orquesta Sinfónica Simón Bolívar (Venezuela's youth orchestra) from 1976 until the opening of the Inter-American Center for Social Action through Music in 2007.

== Artwork ==
The Theater has extraordinary decoration, with fine pieces of artwork.

- There are some major master pieces from the Venezuelan sculptor Jesús Rafael Soto: white vibrant cubes on yellow projection (in the ceiling of the entrance of the Ríos Reyna Hall), vibrant Buckets on white and black progression (in the parking, in front of the José Félix Ribas Hall), vibrant Pyramids (acoustic ceiling of the José Félix Ribas Hall), black Scripture on white bottom and fire-resistant drop curtain (drop curtains of the Ríos Reyna Hall).
- Pedro Basalo created the Bust of Teresa Carreño located in Cellar 1 area.
- Harry Abend developed the Relief mural on inclined screens (in the troncopyramidal peak of the scene of the Ríos Reyna).
- There are also major artists with a presence in the Cultural Complex, such as Erling Oloe, Colette Dellozane, Jorge Pizzani and Vincenzo Gemito.

== Teatro Teresa Carreño Ballet ==
It is one of the stable organizations (alongside the Chorus) created from the start of the theatre in 1979. Its debut was in 1980, and since then it has played several important ballets such as The Nutcracker, Guaraira Repano, Swan Lake, Carmen, and others. It is currently composed of around 30 dancers from all over the country.

Its current choreographer is Laura Fiorucci, and the main coordinator of the Ballet is Luis Penso.

== See also ==
- List of concert halls
