= Pedro Antonio Ríos Reyna =

Venezuelan classical musician

- Born: November 16, 1905; Colón, Táchira State, Venezuela
- Died: February 13, 1971 (aged 65); New York City, U.S.

Pedro Antonio Ríos Reyna (November 16, 1905, in Colón, Táchira State, Venezuela – February 13, 1971, in New York City, U.S.) was one of the most important Venezuelan classical musicians.

Spent his childhood in Caracas and studied at the Fermín Toro Grammar school. In 1913, he began to study violin with José Lorenzo Llamozas, and soon entered the Superior School of Music, where his teachers included Juan Bautista Plaza. When his father was very ill, he played the violin to maintain his family. Soon, he became a professor at the Superior School of Music. In 1929, became General Secretary of the Caracas Philharmonic Union. In 1930, he was one of the founders of the Venezuela Symphony Orchestra, and remained a member of it until 1963. Ríos Reyna organized for ten years the Sunday concerts at the National Library. In 1968, created the Chorale of the Caracas Philharmonic, and the Central University of Venezuela Student Orchestra. In 1970, founds the Symphonic Experimental Orchestra. Pedro Antonio Ríos Reyna died in an automobile accident, New York City, February 13, 1971.

Reyna married Graciela Rousset, with whom he had four children.

== Legacy ==
In 1983, in honor for his work and legacy the principal concert hall of Venezuela's most important arts center, the Teresa Carreño Cultural Complex was named after him.

== See also ==
- Venezuela
- Venezuelan music
- Venezuela Symphony Orchestra
- Teresa Carreño Cultural Complex
