= List of programs broadcast by Multishow =

Programs broadcast by Brazilian cable TV channel

This is a list of television programs broadcast by the Brazilian cable television channel Multishow.

== Current programming ==
=== Original programming ===
- 220 volts
- Adorável Psicose
- Amoral da História
- Até Que Faz Sentido
- Bastidores
- Bicicleta e Melancia
- BBB: A Eliminação (on hiatus)
- Casa Bonita (on hiatus)
- Cilada
- Conexões Urbanas
- De Cabelo em Pé
- De Cara Limpa
- Desenrola Aí
- Dois Elementos
- Experimente
- Extremos
- Fábrica De Estrelas
- Geleia do Rock
- I Love My Nerd
- Intercâmbio
- Kaiak
- Lu Alone
- Lugar Incomum
- Mais X Favela
- Minha Praia
- Morando Sozinho
- Muito Giro
- Na Fama e Na Lama
- Nalu pelo Mundo
- Não Conta Lá em Casa
- No Caminho
- Nós 3
- Olívias na TV
- Operação S2
- Osso Duro
- Outros Lugares
- Papo Calcinha
- Pé no Chão
- As Pegadoras
- Por Trás da Fama
- Qual é a Boa?
- Quase Anônimos
- Que Rock é Esse?
- Reclame
- Rock Estrada
- Se Joga!
- Sensacionalista
- TVZ
  - Clássicos Multishow
  - Top TVZ
  - TVneja
  - TVZ Experimente
- Urbano
- Vai pra Onde?
- Viagem Sem Fim
- Ferdinando Show
- A Grande Farsa
- Tudo Pela Audiência
- Ceará Fora Da Casinha
- Lugar Incomum
- Humor Multishow
- O Estranho Show De Renatinho
- Sexy Car Wash
- 30 Antes dos 30
- Ai eu vi Vantagem
- Papo de Polícia

=== Non-original programming ===
- 100 Coisas Para Fazer Antes de Morrer (The Buried Life)
- Altas Horas (repeat of the previous night's episode on Globo)
- Big Brother Brasil (extended coverage)
- Chapolin (El Chapulín Colorado)
- Chaves (El Chavo del Ocho)
- The City
- O Clube das Bad Girls (The Bad Girls Club)
- Cybernet
- Degrassi: Nova Geração (Degrassi: The Next Generation)
- Desajustados (Misfits)
- Dr. Drew: Rehab (Celebrity Rehab with Dr. Drew)
- Dr. Drew: Sexo Papai e Mamãe (Sex...with Mom and Dad)
- Efeito Ex (The X Effect)
- Fight Girls
- As Gostosas e os Geeks (Beauty and the Geek)
- The Hills
- Jackass
- Life on Mars
- My Big Fat Obnoxious Fiancé
- Paris Hilton's British Best Friend
- Ser Humano (Being Human)
- Sex and the City
- Sexcetera
- Sexytime
- Skins
- Sound
- Chamado Central
- Multishow Music live
- Partoba
- TVZ Classicos
- Treme Treme
- E ai Comeu?
- Anota Ai
- Tá rindo do Quê?

=== Specials ===
- Multishow Ao Vivo
- Multishow Registro
- Prêmio Multishow De Humor
- Vai Que Cola
- Xilindro
- Musica Boa
- Batalha De Pegadinhas
- Quer Dinheiro?
- Só Rindo Com Betty White
- Ai Eu Vim Vantagem
- Foursome
- Meu Passado Me Condena
- Bagulho Louco com Mr.Catra
- Toc`s de Dalila

== Past programming ==
- Agente 86 (Get Smart, currently seen on TCM Classic Entertainment)
- Balada em Revista
- Batom e Parafina
- Beijo, me liga!
- Born to Be
- A Casa Animada (Drawn Together)
- Circo do Edgard
- Code Monkeys
- Dead Set
- Diddy Monta Sua Banda (Making His Band)
- Edgard no Ar
- Fundo do Poço (Rock Bottom)
- Havaí 5-0 (Hawaii Five-O, 1968–1980 series)
- Inside the Actors Studio (currently seen on Film & Arts)
- Instant Star (currently seen on Boomerang)
- The Kids in the Hall
- Laguna Beach (Laguna Beach: The Real Orange County)
- MOB Brasil
- Na Trilha Certa (Redemption Song)
- Newport Harbor (Newport Harbor: The Real Orange County)
- O Mundo Secreto de Alex Mack (The Secret World of Alex Mack)
- Quero Ser Um Cineasta
- Será que Faz Sentido?
- Só Rindo (Just for Laughs)
- South Park (currently seen on VH1)
- Stargame
- Tribos
- Vida Loca Show
- The Wonder Years
