= Juan Andrés Pizzani =

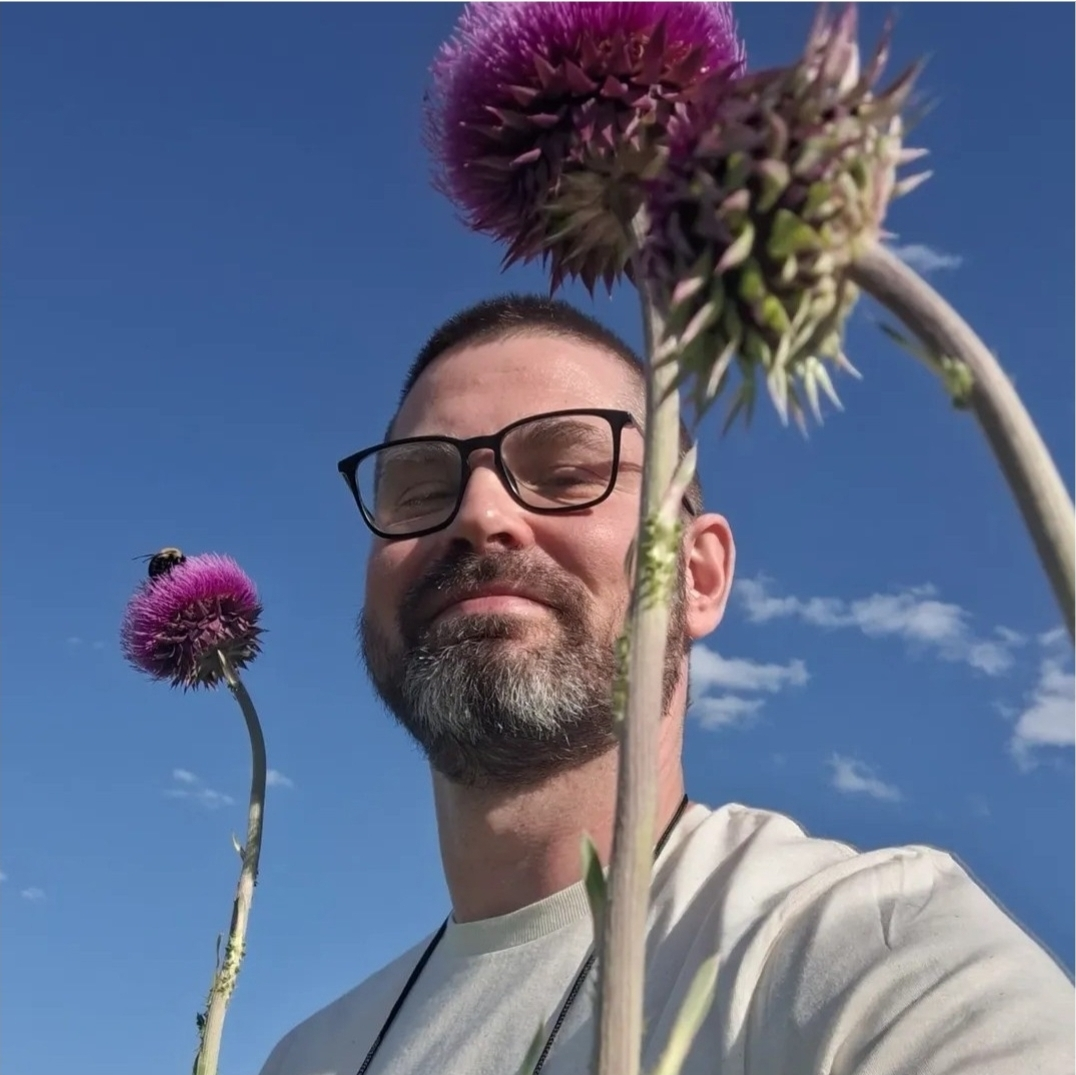
- Self-portrait of Pizzani
- Born: Juan Andrés Pizzani Ochoa; 1979 (age 46–47); Caracas, Venezuela
- Education: Universidad Metropolitana; University of Cincinnati; Universidad de los Andes
- Occupations: Writer, poet, literary translator and editor
- Notable work: Visita guiada (2007); Autoetnografía en una agencia de marketing de Lima (2020)

Juan Andrés Pizzani Ochoa (born 1979) is a Venezuelan writer, poet, literary translator and editor. His work focuses primarily on autofiction and poetry, exploring memory, sexuality, migration, and the role of family and cultural institutions in shaping identity and power relations in Venezuelan and Latin American society. He is the author of the autofictional novel Visita guiada (2007), the bilingual poetry collection Café (2022), and the autofictional chronicles Onaka ga peko peko (2021) and Autoetnografía en una agencia de marketing de Lima (2020), among other works.

== Education ==
Pizzani studied modern languages, with a minor in translation, at the Universidad Metropolitana, graduating in 2004. He subsequently completed a master's degree in Spanish literature at the University of Cincinnati and received a doctorate in anthropology from the University of the Andes in 2017. His doctoral dissertation examined masculinity, diversity and homophobia within a middle-class family in Caracas.

In 2003, he was selected to participate in the poetry creative-writing workshop organised by the Rómulo Gallegos Center for Latin American Studies (CELARG). Poems produced during the workshop were included in the anthology Voces nuevas 2003–2004, published by CELARG in 2004.

== Literary career ==
Pizzani's literary work includes fiction, poetry and autofiction.

His first book, Visita guiada, was published in 2007 by Fundación Editorial El Perro y la Rana. It is a fragmentary novel combining personal memories with references to contemporary art.

In 2020, the digital publication Prodavinci published his chronicle Autoetnografía en una agencia de marketing de Lima, based on his experience as a Venezuelan migrant working at a marketing agency in Peru.

In 2021, the Spanish publishing house Petalurgia published Onaka ga peko peko as part of its Arcania series. The publisher described the work as an autoethnographic narrative concerned with hunger and everyday life during the Venezuelan crisis.

In 2022, he published Café, a poetry collection issued by Petalurgia as part of its Versalia series. The publication contains poems in Spanish and English, accompanied by photographs taken by Pizzani.

His poetry has also appeared in the anthologies Voces nuevas (2004), Cartografías resilientes (2022) and El cinturón del viento.

== Literary translation ==
As a literary translator, Pizzani has translated works by Luis J. Rodríguez, Marion Bethel and Laxmi Shanker Bajpai into Spanish. His translations appeared in anthologies associated with the 2006 and 2013 editions of the World Poetry Festival of Venezuela.

In 2026, he translated into Spanish the interview “Un recorrido por la obra de Lucía Pizzani a propósito de su primera muestra institucional en Londres”, conducted by curator Inês Costa and published by the contemporary-art magazine Artishock.

== Editorial work ==
Between 2011 and 2015, Pizzani worked as an editor at Fundación Editorial El Perro y la Rana and the Venezuelan National History Centre. He contributed to the editing of publications on literature, anthropology and history.

Books on which he worked include Néstor Perlongher: Antología diacrónica (2014), Crítica a los discursos sobre las prácticas sexuales de los pueblos originarios (2015) and the second edition of La cultura campesina en los Andes venezolanos (2016).

== Works ==
=== Novel ===
Visita guiada (Fundación Editorial El Perro y la Rana, 2007). ISBN 978-980-7163-97-2.

=== Poetry ===
Café (Petalurgia, 2022).

=== Autofiction ===
Autoetnografía en una agencia de marketing de Lima (Prodavinci, 2020). Onaka ga peko peko (Petalurgia, 2021).

=== Anthologies ===
Voces nuevas 2003–2004 (CELARG, 2004). Cartografías resilientes (LP5 Editora, 2022). El cinturón del viento (Viterbo University Press).
