= National Art Gallery (Caracas) =

- Galería de Arte Nacional
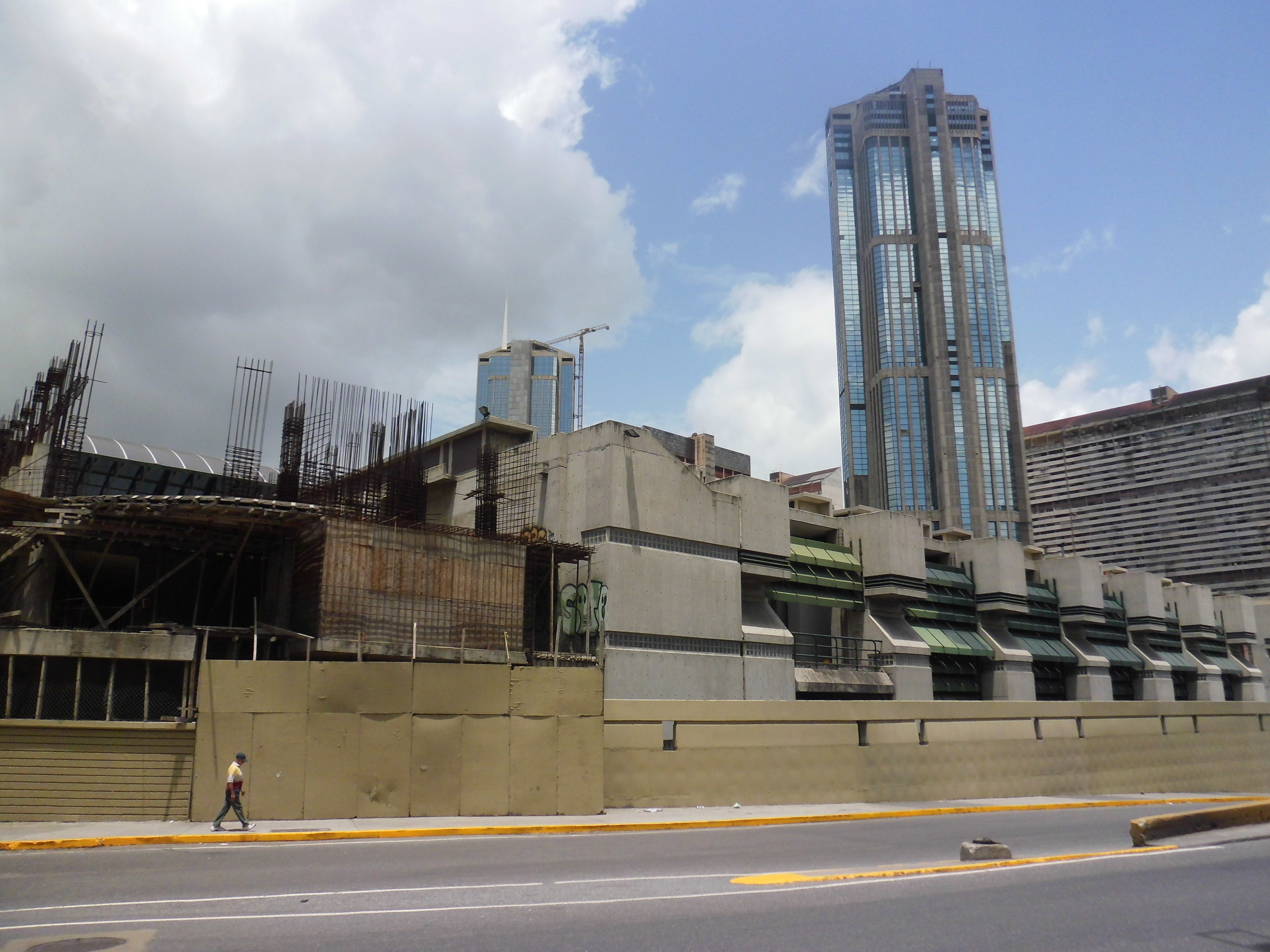
- Eastern façade of the gallery.
- Established: May 1976
- Location: Caracas, Venezuela
- Coordinates: 10°30′2″N 66°54′9″W
- Type: Art museum

The National Art Gallery (Galería de Arte Nacional; GAN) also known as Gallery of National Art is located in the Plaza Morelos area of Caracas, Venezuela. The museum opened in May 1976. In 2009 it moved to a new building designed by Carlos Gómez de Llerena, Venezuela's largest museum building.

== History ==
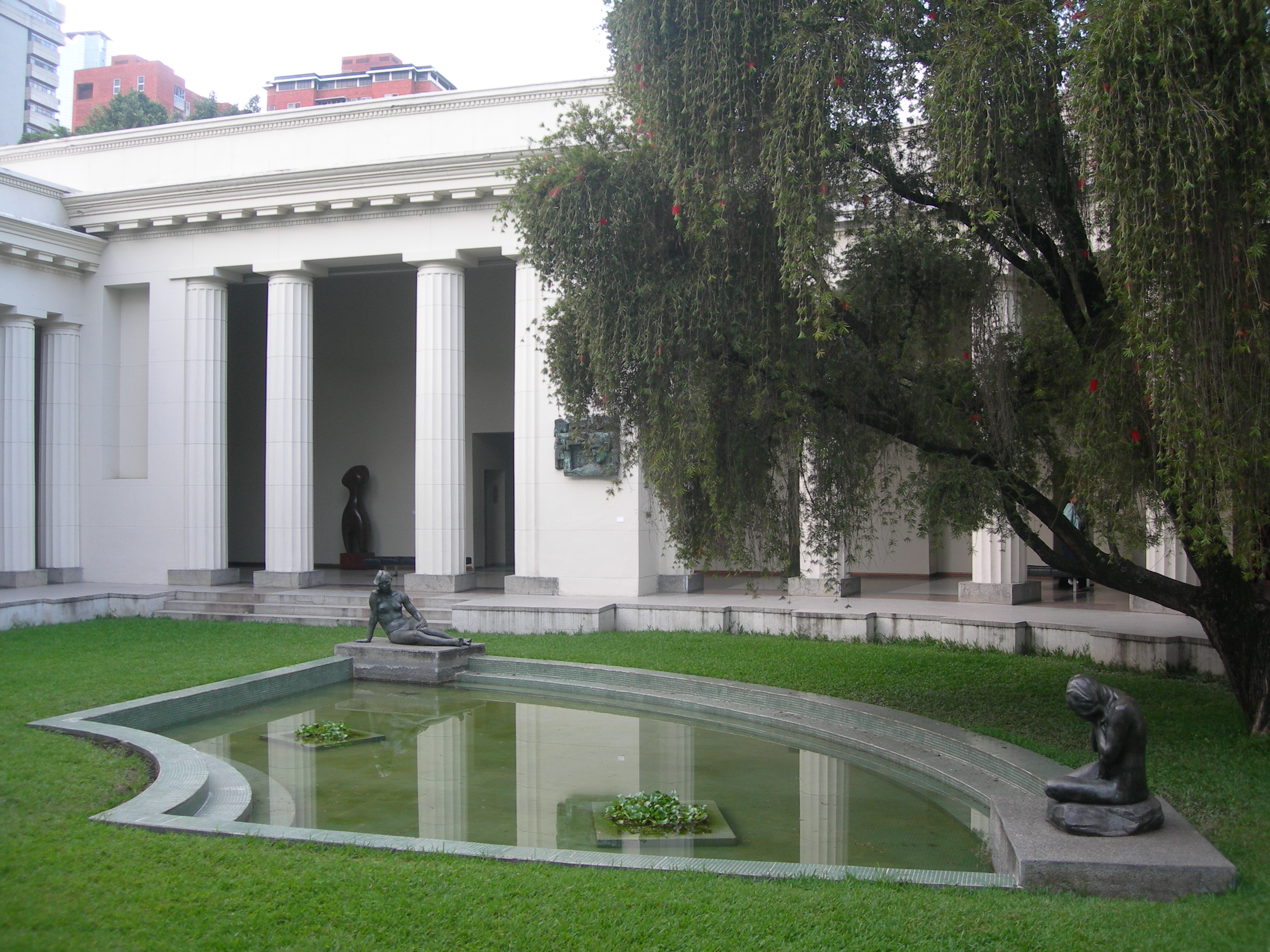
The former home of the National Art Gallery, now the Fine Art Museum

The museum was housed until 2009 in a neo-classical building near Los Caobos Park. The building was designed in 1935 for the Fine Art Museum (Museo de Bellas Artes). by Carlos Raul Villanueva, one of the best-known architects of Venezuela. The facade incorporates reliefs by Francisco Narváez, Venezuela's first modernist sculptor.

In 2009 President Hugo Chávez inaugurated a new building for the National Art Gallery, allowing the Fine Art Museum to reoccupy its old building.

== Collections ==
It features works of art by Venezuelan artists and artists such as Camille Pissarro who spent time in Venezuela. The collections span some five centuries from the colonial days featuring colonial Caracas and the period of Simón Bolívar.

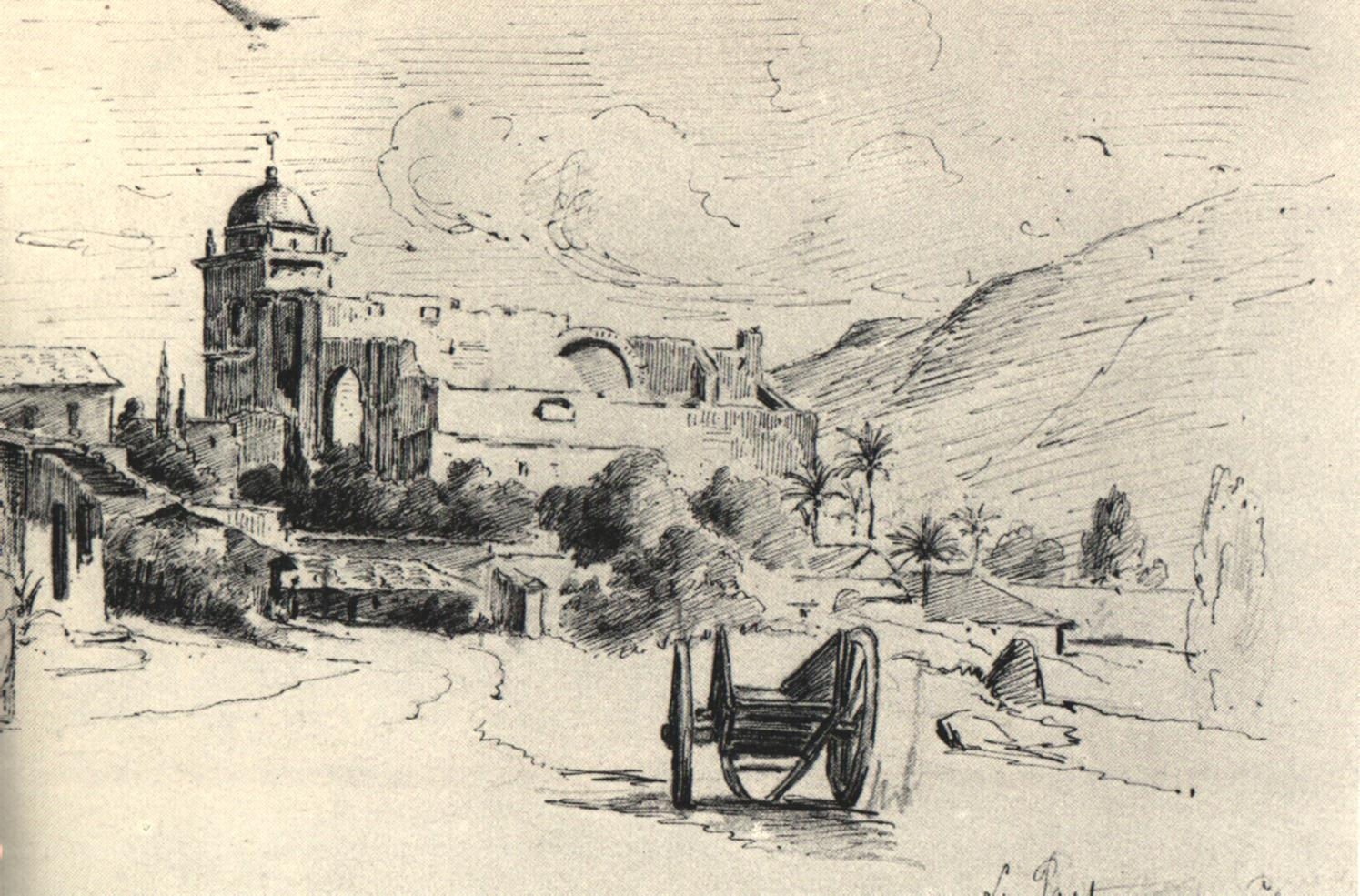
La Pastora, Caracas. Drawing by Pissarro

The museum has been extolled as a “patriotic celebration of national artists” reminiscent Venezuelan society.

There are more than 4,000 pieces in its eleven rooms (arranged in a circular layout), with international and Venezuelan art. It has paintings of more than 40 Venezuelan artists. The works include pre-Hispanic pieces, colonial-era paintings, sculptures, and Venezuelan works of modern art.

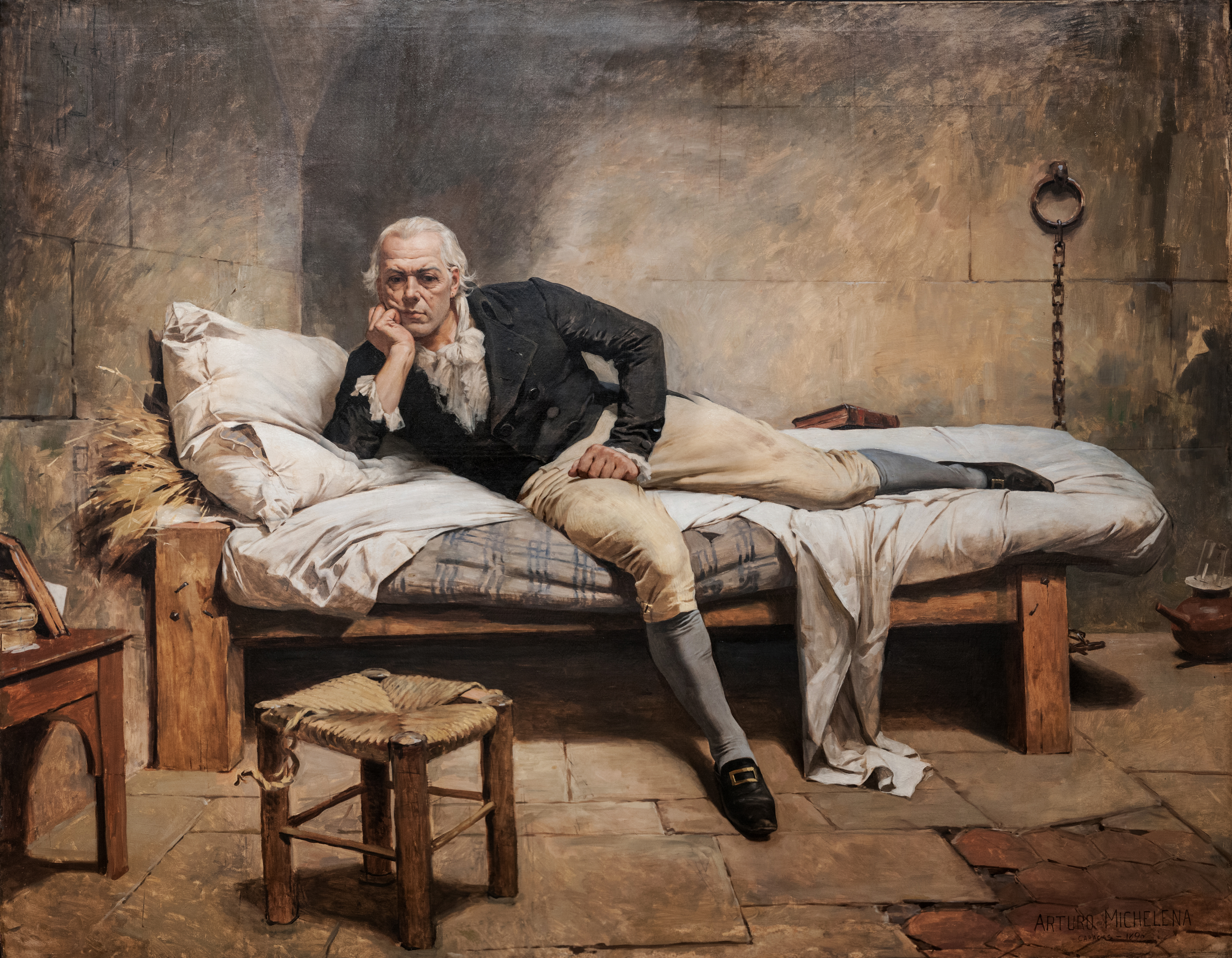
Miranda en La Carraca (1896), Arturo Michelena's depiction of Francisco de Miranda's imprisonment in Cádiz, Spain (oil on canvas, 196.6 x 245.5 cm).

Temporary exhibitions exhibit artistic culture from pre-Hispanic times to the modern kinetic art. Meyer Weismann of Caracas held his first solo exhibition of Venezuelan culture in this museum. Other famous artists whose work is exhibited in the museum are Arturo Michelena, Armando Reverón, Carlos Cruz-Diez, Pájaro and Jesús Soto. The museum's most notable piece is Michelena’s 1896 painting of Francisco de Miranda in a Spanish jail, Miranda en La Carraca. Its collection of modern sculpture includes works by Abigail Varela, Pedro Barreto, Colette Delozanne and Carlos Mendoza. An account of the collection may be found in the Spanish edition of the Wikipedia.

== See also ==
- List of national galleries
