= Museo de Bellas Artes (Caracas) =

Art museum in Venezuela

Coordinates: 10.5005°N 66.8973°W

Museum of Fine Arts
- Museo de Bellas Artes
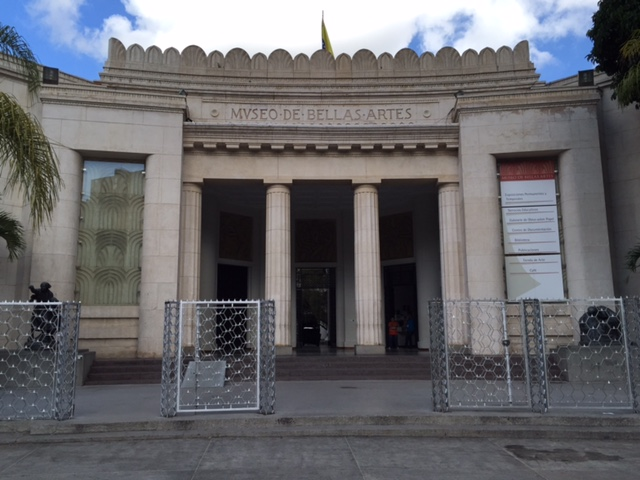
- Established: 1917
- Location: Plaza de los Museos, Bellas Artes; Caracas, Venezuela
- Website: http://www.fmn.gob.ve/museos/museo-bellas-artes

The Museum of Fine Arts (Spanish: Museo de Bellas Artes or MBA) is an art museum in Caracas, Venezuela. It was founded in 1917, and was originally housed in the building now known as the Palacio de las Academias.

Its current buildings were both designed by architect Carlos Raúl Villanueva, a 1930s Neoclassical structure and a 1970s Brutalist structure.

In the 1970s the Museum moved out of the neoclassical building to provide a home for the newly established National Art Gallery. It has reoccupied this space since the inauguration of a new building for the National Art Gallery in 2009.

== Collections ==
The collections include ceramics and ancient Egyptian art.
