= List of artworks in University City of Caracas =

UNESCO World Heritage Site
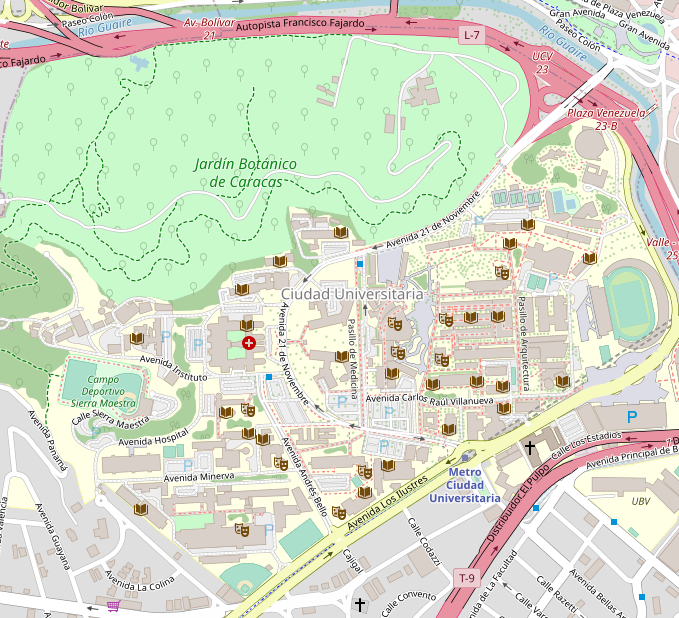
- Artworks within the University City (Note: Adapted from a map of murals, artwork listings, a map of the FAU, a map of the cultural center, a pamphlet on art in several other locations, as well as other public access maps of the campus and artwork location descriptions)
- Location: University City of Caracas, Venezuela
- Criteria: Cultural: (i), (iv)
- Reference: 986
- Inscription: 2000 (24th Session)

The University City of Caracas is a World Heritage Site in Caracas, Venezuela. It is a functional university campus for the Central University of Venezuela, as well as home to 108 notable works of art and famous examples of creative architecture. Many works of art are modernist and mosaic. The campus was designed by architect Carlos Raúl Villanueva, who oversaw much of the construction and design work, with the artwork overseen by Mateo Manaure.

Villanueva primarily enlisted artists who were either European or had European influences – Villanueva himself had been inspired for the campus design in Paris – including members of Los Disidentes, a group of Venezuelan artists who left for Europe to break from the Mexican mural tradition. Some artists did not initially want to work on the project, as they were opposed to the military dictatorship in place in Venezuela at the time, but French artist Fernand Léger encouraged them to participate by saying that "dictatorships pass but art remains"; part of Villanueva's intention was unity. Latin American art scholar Monica Amor wrote that Villanueva's Synthesis of the Arts philosophy, inspired by an André Bloc approach, "advocated a strong humanist approach to urban issues of reconstruction and social healing after the devastation of World War II." Amor noted that debate surrounding the dictatorship's funding of the project, and its realization in this context, persists into the 21st century.

Catalan urbanist Josep Lluís Sert was involved with the Spanish pavilion at the 1937 Paris Exhibition, which was opposite the Venezuelan pavilion that Villanueva helped create; Sert's pavilion (especially the patios) as well as the ideals of the Exhibition greatly inspired Villanueva, who would become friends with Sert after the war. Sert visited the University City in the early 1950s and introduced Villanueva to Alexander Calder.

The experience of the artwork and of the campus architecture was intended to be appreciated by moving through it, something inspired by Le Corbusier (and, in turn, Arab architecture). In the Plaza Cubierta, the center of the campus (and, at conception, Caracas), the organic forms of the winding pathways contrasts with the regular grid of its support structures, which is reflected in the artworks: curved walls support murals, breeze blocks frame design elements. In their book Modern Architecture in Latin America: Art, Technology, and Utopia, Carranza and Lara discuss the "movements" of Villanueva's Synthesis of the Arts, and the functions of certain pieces within their spaces.

Space is known through something that moves: the object or the spectator, and walking reveals to our vision the diversity of events.

— Carlos Raúl Villanueva, quoted in Monica Amor Gego: Weaving the Space in Between

Despite the philosophy of synthesis, criticism from the 1970s and the 2020s notes that not all works on the campus contribute equally as functional and artistic pieces; sculptures may not become part of the structures in the same way as murals, while some works were designed without ever seeing the campus. However, the same critics agreed that most of the works were "space definers" and as such were architectural by nature as well as artistic by design.

Amor wrote that the individual artworks creating the spaces of the campus "cannot be assessed individually". She describes many of the murals on the campus as showing "repetition, discontinuity, compression and expansion, dynamism, rhythmic composition, contrasting shapes, geometric organization, and anti-hierarchical allover-ness."

== By Venezuelan artists ==
=== "El primer libro" ===
Just inside the main entrance of the Central Library is a stone depicting a petroglyph, carved by ancient indigenous people of Venezuela. The story of its placement is that it is the first book of the library, waiting for somebody to come and read it, but nobody can because the language is lost. Based on comments from scholars and university figures, it has been deemed that these people do not consider the petroglyph stone to be part of the university's heritage, nor as one of the campus works of art; the same distancing is seen with other elements of indigenous culture across the country. Map reference on this page: L5.

=== Francisco Narváez ===
Construction of the campus began in the late 1940s, with the first artworks being installed in 1950. These were designed by Francisco Narváez for the medical complex. Narváez, an old friend of Villanueva, created many pieces of artwork for the campus, in various media.^{:137}

The mosaics at the entrance to the Institute of Experimental Medicine were installed by María Luisa Tovar. Three statues by Narváez on the campus are made of Cumarebo stone: El Atleta, a large statue in the sports complex, and La educación and La ciencia in the medical complex.^{:137} These last two are detailed depictions of female nudity,^{:137} something Narváez covers in his art with different materials frequently. The Cumarebo stone is a favorite material of Narváez. A slightly later statue, La cultura (identified as "Sculpture" in Fraser's book), is more figurative, showing the influence of the European artists designing for the campus on Narváez.^{:137}

Artworks by Francisco Narváez in University City of Caracas (Note: Where not otherwise referenced in-line, the information is from the work's citation in the complete list)
Work	Description	Year	Location	Map ref.
Untitled mural	Mosaic mural of surgical and religious imagery, including Adam and Eve and the Holy Grail	1950	On the right-side wall at the entrance to the Institute of Experimental Medicine	H5
Cristo	Painted fresco depicting Jesus on the cross, surrounded by female figures	1950	Behind the altar in the Chapel of the University Hospital	H13
La educación	Statue, made of Cumarebo stone, of a woman sitting sideways and balancing a book on a raised knee	1950	On the first floor terrace of the Institute of Experimental Medicine	H6
Untitled mural	Mosaic mural of anatomical images, including a Vitruvian woman	1950-51	On the left-side wall at the entrance to the José Izquierdo Institute of Anatomy	H12
Untitled mural	Mosaic mural of a sea life scene, including fish, a shark, and an octopus	1951	On the wall of the university dining space; damaged during renovations	C1
La ciencia	Statue, made of Cumarebo stone, of a woman sitting sideways and a boy kneeling in her lap, in the position of Jesus on the cross	1951	On the first floor terrace of the José Izquierdo Institute of Anatomy	H11
El Atleta	Statue, made of Cumarebo stone, of a stylized geometric male athlete in an Atlas pose	1951-52	Outside the University Olympic Stadium	S1
Untitled sculpture	A bronze wall-mounted sculpture of José Gregorio Hernández, with a microscope and dedication plaque	1953	On an outside wall of the Institute of Experimental Medicine	H4
La cultura	Bronze sculpture of an abstract figure	1954	Originally placed on the tenth floor terrace of the Central Library, it was then moved to the garden of the medical complex. In 1984 it was moved to its position in the northwest of Rectory Plaza.	R10
Torso	Wooden sculpture of a woman's torso	1956	On the eighth floor of the Faculty of Architecture and Urban Planning	AU2
Untitled mural	Wooden panel three-dimensional relief mural of abstract shapes	1956	In the Henri Pittier Library of the Caracas Botanical Garden	B2
Dr. José María Vargas	A bust and dedication to José María Vargas, commissioned by rector Edmundo Chirinos to mark the bicentennial of Vargas's birth	1987	In the south of Rectory Plaza, next to the covered pathway into the Rectory building	R5

=== Alejandro Colina ===
Alejandro Colina made María Lionza, a statue of María Lionza, in 1951; a replica sits just outside the university on the Francisco Fajardo freeway, but the work is nevertheless owned by the university, protected by the university's artwork commission for the heritage site, and generally viewed as part of the campus environs. Restorer Fernando de Tovar has described the replica as "ridiculous"; it was made by Silvestre Chacón in 2004, to protect the original, which has significant heritage value. This has been a point of controversy, with some arguing that the original's heritage means it should be the only one displayed, rather than hidden for safekeeping. The original statue has been kept locked in a workshop at UCV since 2004, despite orders to put it back along the highway. It was significantly damaged when the local council took the mold to create the replica.

The statue was originally made to sit outside the Olympic Stadium for the 1951 Bolivarian Games. With the expansion of the city, the road system was made larger, and the statue was moved a short distance to an island between lanes of the highway.

Artworks by Alejandro Colina in University City of Caracas
Work	Description	Year	Location	Map ref.
María Lionza	Giant statue depicting the indigenous goddess María Lionza riding a tapir and holding aloft a woman's pelvis	1951	Original in a UCV workshop; replica along the Francisco Fajardo freeway	S9

=== Armando Barrios ===
Villanueva approached Armando Barrios in 1952 to create a number of murals for the campus. Barrios' murals are mosaics made of glass, and are considered part of his "abstract-geometric" period. After 1954, his work became less abstract and incorporated more identifiable human figures. As a music lover, Barrios incorporated a musical flow into his designs.

Julio Nicolás Camacho has described the mural on the Museum building of Rectory Plaza poetically, referring to the images as "curtains that imitate waves [and] mountain peaks".^{:509} The mural is 9 feet (2.7 m) high and over 66 feet (20 m) long, and is said to be a "pictorial melody". Carranza and Lara wrote that the mural "aims at dematerializing the structure and form" of the museum away from a purely functional grid-like building.

The Olympic Stadium murals use mosaic tiles imported from Venice. The mural here with horizontal stripes is also considered "melodic", with Ronnie Saravo Sánchez writing that the use of color and the Renaissance influence "link it conceptually with movements such as Cubism and Russian constructivism, [and] served as a support for the creation of a new universe where the figure and background are diluted until reaching an almost abstract stylization".

Artworks by Armando Barrios in University City of Caracas
Work	Description	Year	Location	Map ref.
Untitled mural	A graphic design of overlapping lines in shades of bright blue, green, yellow and grey; the color changes where lines intersect. There is a background of vertical stripes on the right of the mural	1951	On the facade of the University Olympic Stadium, sixth mural from south to north	S7
Untitled mural	A graphic design of overlapping lines in shades of bright blue, green, yellow, purple and grey; the color changes where lines intersect. There is a background of horizontal stripes on the left of the mural	1951	On the facade of the University Olympic Stadium, third mural from south to north	S4
Untitled mural	A graphic design of overlapping lines in shades of muted purple, yellow, white and blue; the color changes where lines intersect	1953	On the north side of the west facade of the Museum Building in Rectory Plaza	R8

=== Carlos Gonzaléz Bogen ===
Bogen lived in Paris from 1948 until 1951, returning to Venezuela to open a gallery with Mateo Manaure and contribute murals to the campus. Bogen had already cultivated an interest in combining art and architecture when making great murals for walls and doors, and the Synthesis of the Arts project allowed him to explore this. He also contributed several works, including murals and glassworks, to the UCV CDCH campus.

Artworks by Carlos Gonzaléz Bogen in University City of Caracas
Work	Description	Year	Location	Map ref.
Untitled mural	Geometric shapes, mostly triangles or based on triangles, in grey, black, and yellow on a white background	1951	On the facade of the University Olympic Stadium, fifth mural from south to north	S6
Untitled mural	Geometric shapes, mostly triangles or based on triangles, in blue, black, and yellow on a grey background	1951	On the facade of the University Olympic Stadium, first mural from south to north	S2
Untitled mural	Orange, brown, and black rectangles of different sizes and perpendicular orientation are shown	1953	Lower floor of the central library, at the front of the hall of the humanities/reading hall	L8
Untitled mural	Rectangle and similar shapes in various shades of grey create a pattern on a wall behind stairs, there are some orange rectangles near the top	1953 or 1954	In the atrium of the Aula Magna	A2

=== Mateo Manaure ===
Mateo Manaure has a reported 26 pieces of work on the campus. Though his pieces are mostly ceramic murals, he also created wooden acoustic frames and stained-glass windows. In addition, he created ventilation elements of the hospital lobby, and was the artwork supervisor of the project.

Artworks by Mateo Manaure in University City of Caracas
Work	Description	Year	Location	Map ref.
Untitled mural	A graphic design of straight and curved lines primarily in black, yellow, orange, and blue. There is little overlap of shapes.	1951	On the facade of the University Olympic Stadium, fourth mural from south to north	S5
Untitled mural	A graphic design of straight and curved lines primarily in shades of orange with black and blue. The shapes overlap significantly.	1951	On the facade of the University Olympic Stadium, second mural from south to north	S3
Untitled mural	A three-part wall of red tile at the entrance to the central library, evoking the building's facade. The library's name is written above the doors in the center, with two panels near the door, one largely white and the other largely black.	1954	Main entrance to the Central Library	L4
Untitled mural	An abstract geometric mural in shades of blue, red, white, and black. There are four unequally-sized sections marked by different background colors, patterned with lines and various shapes.	1954	In the covered walkway next to the entrance of the central library. It is opposite Vasarely's Positif-Negatif.	PC7
Untitled mural	An abstract geometric mural in shades of yellow, black, white, blue and red. It is composed of nine rectangular panels, wider than they are tall, laid out 3x3. The left and right are predominantly yellow with some white and blue; the middle column resembles a zebra crossing with nine alternating black and white stripes, black at top and bottom, patterned with thinner colored stripes.	1954	On the east facade of the Sala de Conciertos, facing the Tierra de Nadie	TN2
Untitled mural	Four quadrilaterals of different colors (from left to right: red, yellow, green, blue) are overlaid by a pattern of black lines	1954	Covers the external rear (north) wall of the Paraninfo auditorium hall	PC1
Untitled hospital terrace mural	Simple shapes in bright colors are placed sporadically across the mural.	1954	On the far south wall of the seventh floor terrace of the University Hospital	
Untitled hospital murals	Seven murals, similar to the terrace mural, are inside the hospital lobby.	1954	The lobby of the University Hospital	
Hospital facade	Polychromatic design of the hospital facade.	1954	University Hospital	
Untitled bimural	The first side, facing the Aula Magna, has a grey background with purple horizontal stripes. There is an abstract image in white, black, and red in the right half of the mural. The second side, facing the road, is an abstract geometric design in white, red, blue, and black. Between the Berger des nuages and the first side of the bimural is a small pool.	1954	At the edge of the Plaza Cubierta behind the Aula Magna, next to Arp's Berger des nuages; in the open air by an exit of the area	PC9
Untitled acoustic frames	Two acoustic frames. They are made of two-colored wood, and are paneled with layers of thin slats alternately horizontal and vertical that have been stained in places to reflect the recurrent stripe designs present in Manaure's murals. One has an outer layer with vertical slats and horizontal stripes in red; the other has an outer layer with horizontal slats and vertical stripes in black. They are of obscure geometric shapes rather than having smooth edges.	1954	One on each side of the stage inside the Sala de Conciertos	PC14
Untitled stained-glass windows	Made of concrete and glass, these are brightly colored with large enough panels to diffuse light in artistic ways	1954	On selected walls of the Paraninfo auditorium hall	PC10
Untitled curved mural	A mural wrapping around a column, featuring geometric patterns in red, black and blue on a white background. There is one green shape, near the bottom at the middle. Next to the mural is a plaque.	1954	On the ground floor of the Aula Magna, between the covered lobby and the lockers	A1
Untitled murals of the Faculty of Engineering	A thematic single spread of murals, from the east entrance of the Faculty building winding along walls and finishing on the second floor	1954	Faculty of Engineering, east entrance, ground floor, first floor, and second floor	
Untitled mural, known as La pared de ciencias	A giant three-dimensional mural made of metal and painted beneath, some features look like cogs and gears	1955	Exterior wall of the Faculty of Sciences workshop building/Biblioteca Alonso Gamero	SC1
Untitled mural	A yellow, white, and black striped mural over panels on a zigzag wall	1956	Faculty of Architecture and Urban Planning, ground floor, in the corridor outside the Taller Galia, opposite mural below	AU12
Untitled murals	Group of five murals, separated by blocks of white, that are largely black with red, white, and yellow straight-line patterns, on a zigzag wall	1956	Faculty of Architecture and Urban Planning, ground floor, in the corridor outside the Taller Galia. On the wall of the T.G., opposite mural above	AU3
Construcción cromática	Symmetrical design of square and triangular panels, predominantly white but featuring a pattern of yellow, pink, and orange	1998	Inside FaCES, to the right of the main entrance	

=== Héctor Poleo ===
Héctor Poleo painted an unnamed fresco during 1953 and 1954 that adorns the wall of the first floor of the Rector's office in the Rectory building. The mural reflects "the academic character of the university and the [Rector's] office". A detail of the mural was used on a souvenir sheet printed by IPOSTEL in 1983 that celebrated the bicentenary of Simón Bolívar's birth.

Artworks by Héctor Poleo in University City of Caracas
Work	Description	Year	Location	Map ref.
Untitled fresco mural	Different figures perform tasks relating to the different academic disciplines of the university, featuring architects, doctors, teachers and artists. There is also a figure appearing to sleep on the floor in the lower middle of the painting, and figures watching over the academic activities from the back.	1953-54	On an inside wall of the first floor of the Rector's office	R1

=== Carlos Raúl Villanueva & Juan Otaola Paván ===
Villanueva designed the entire campus, and also contributed significantly to the artwork and design of the UCV Clock Tower, working with Otaola. The clock tower is considered to be of revolutionary structural and symbolic design.

Artworks by Juan Otaola Paván in University City of Caracas
Work	Description	Year	Location	Map ref.
Torre del Reloj (Clock Tower)	A tall obelisk like structure of three prestressed concrete columns twisting upwards and supported by horizontal crossbars. Atop are three simple flat disks bearing clock faces, tilted slightly.	1953	At the north edge of the Plaza del Rectorado	R11

=== Harry Abend ===
Abend, an alumnus of the Architecture school of UCV, incorporated this practice into his sculptures, including the one situated on the campus. He worked often with tridimensional shapes, something else shown in the piece.

Artworks by Harry Abend in University City of Caracas
Work	Description	Year	Location	Map ref.
Homenaje al Maestro Villaneuva	A concrete structure	1973	Between the tower and the library of the Faculty of Architecture and Urbanism	AU22
Untitled sculpture	A large rock suspended by an iron structure protruding from the ground, with two legs each splitting into a triangular cradle, holding the rock like a claw	?	Outside the entrance to the school of metallurgy and material science	

=== Pedro León Castro ===
Completed in 1954, Castro's mural is considered a work of Social realism.

Artworks by Pedro León Castro in University City of Caracas
Work	Description	Year	Location	Map ref.
Fechas Magnas de la Universidad	A mural featuring professions of the university, though largely surgeons and astronomers. There are also chambers, a large image of a human brain, and a figure in a mortarboard.	1954	On the first floor of the Rectory building, University Council meeting room	R3

=== Pascual Navarro ===
The Navarro murals of the Plaza Cubierta are easily recognized, but his mural in the library is considered a "hidden treasure" and was for a while closed off from the public due to renovations between 2007 and 2011.

Artworks by Pascual Navarro in University City of Caracas
Work	Description	Year	Location	Map ref.
Untitled curved mural	An abstract geometric design of predominantly straight-line shapes, in white, yellow, black, and lilac	1954	At the north of the Plaza Cubierta, next to the Paraninfo	PC5
Untitled mural	A three-wall zigzag mural of predominantly oblong shapes with curved edges displayed horizontally, in yellow, black, purple, and white	1954	Entrance of the Sala de Conciertos from within the Plaza Cubierta, on the east side	PC13
Untitled mural	A single wall mural of a similar design to the three-wall one, but featuring a lot of green elements	1954	South wall of the Francisco de Miranda room ("Room E") of the central library, opposite the elevators	

=== Alírio Oramas ===
Oramas spent time in Europe in the early 1950s, and upon his return in 1956 contributed to creating artworks specifically for the campus. He made what is said to be four murals, three for the library (Note: Here these are listed as two. Two of the mural pieces form one titled piece, Progresión rítmica en tres movimientos.) and one for the FAU.

Artworks by Alírio Oramas in University City of Caracas
Work	Description	Year	Location	Map ref.
Progresión rítmica en tres movimientos	On two adjoining walls are three parts of the mural. The first has a white tiled background with colorful dots in a grid pattern, and straight black lines of different angles forming a thread, creating shapes. The second has a solid blue background, and is half the size of the others; on it are two white squares, one in the bottom left and one in the top right that has been rotated to appear as a diamond. In the lower one is a 6x6 grid of colored dots, in the top is a 5x5 grid of colored dots. The third mural is a tiled blue background with the same line pattern as the first, rendered in white and rotated 180 degrees, it also has colorful semi-circles in a random pattern.	1954	On the 12th floor of the central library	L3
Variación en 36 colores	A curved mural with a background of various shades of grey. There are three sets of 6x6 squares made of smaller colored squares. Each has the same pattern. The first is on the left, the second is in the center and slightly higher, and is a 45 degree rotation of the first. The third is at the same height as the second, and is a further rotation, approaching but not quite reaching 180 degrees from the original.	1954	On the 12th floor of the central library	L2
Untitled mural	Plastic quadrangles, all aligned with a side parallel to the floor, are arranged across a wooden wall. The squares and rectangles are in blue, yellow, white and black, with some being transparent. One large transparent square overlaps another shape, and has an irregular pentagon with curved lines on it in black.	1956	On the first floor of the Faculty of Architecture and Urbanism, in front of the study control	AU17

=== Alejandro Otero ===
Otero had been visiting Paris in the early 1950s, but returned to Venezuela to contribute to the project. A postcard featuring a photograph of his stained-glass window was published in 2007 by IPOSTEL.

Artworks by Alejandro Otero in University City of Caracas
Work	Description	Year	Location	Map ref.
Untitled mural	Spanning a wall that is vaguely composed of two semicircular parts joined with arcs facing upwards, two large windows break the piece up. It has a black background and is laddered with white stripes, horizontal lines straight but vertical ones unevenly slanted across. Several of the quadrangles thus formed are colored in orange, yellow, and grey.	1954	Facade of the library of the Faculty of Engineering	
Untitled mural	A white tiled wall, with several colored rectangles, all standing on a short end, scattered across it. Each tile is bordered by metal rods.	1954	Main building of the Faculty of Engineering	
Untitled mural	A white tiled wall with thick black and blue stripes running from top to bottom.	1954	Auditorium of the Faculty of Engineering	
Untitled mural	Giant panels of blue and purple quadrangles patterned in rows. A short, long, external wall of white with horizontal black stripes. Panels of a tall external wall, stacked, each with black vertical stripes that differ in thickness from thinnest at the left to thickest at the right, on a white background.	1956	The facade of the Faculty of Architecture and Urbanism main building	AU1
Untitled mural	Painted quadrangles in faded colors, appearing as shades of grey, patterned in rows.	1957	The facade of the Faculty of Pharmacy main building	
Untitled stained-glass window	A stained-glass window of a similar pattern to his 1954 white-tile Faculty of Engineering mural, but with smaller colored rectangles.	1954	The east wall of the library of the Faculty of Engineering	
Tres murales en policromías	Three mural walls, each with a white background and stripes. The stripes are of a uniform color that differs between walls.	?	Faculty of Architecture	

=== Oswaldo Vigas ===
Oswaldo Vigas' murals form a lot of the views of the south of Rectory Plaza. Carranza and Lara describe Vigas' murals as part of Villanueva's second movement within the rhythm of the campus design, saying that they "are intended to give an impression of lightening the feeling of the Administration building and to highlight the dynamic form of the Communications building".

Artworks by Oswaldo Vigas in University City of Caracas
Work	Description	Year	Location	Map ref.
Composición Estática-Composición Dinámica	A two panel mural, the left with an orange background and the right with a yellow one. Various elements that appear as humans or animals with teeth are rendered in a Cubist fashion, in dark shades of green and red. There are also curved elements, with the same color palette. The figures are rendered as horizontal rectangles with triangular and circular additions.	1954	On the south side of the west facade of the Museum Building in Rectory Plaza	R7
Un Elemento Estático en Cinco Posiciones	On a grey background, human or animal figures of a Cubist design are seen in five different positions. The figures are rendered as above, in shades of dark and muted blue, red, and yellow.	1954	On the east wall of the Communications Building in Rectory Plaza	R6
Un Elemento – personaje vertical en evolución horizontal	The same kind of figures are shown, but are illustrated with less solid lines and more 'brush strokes' and curves (though still tiled, mosaic-style like the others). The figures are also vertical; there are more of them, and they are in brighter and a wider range of colors, though all shades of red, yellow, green, and blue. The figures form the whole mural.	1954	On a column wall at the entrance to the Rectory	R2
Un Elemento – personaje triple	Three of the figures, horizontal again but brightly colored and appearing roughly sketched, are on a brightly patterned background featuring circular and branch-like images.	1954	On the east wall of the Rectory, facing the Tierra de Nadie	R4

=== Victor Valera ===
Artworks by Victor Valera in University City of Caracas
Work	Description	Year	Location	Map ref.
Untitled mural	A mural in two halves, one white and one black. It features zigzag patterns of a horizontal nature continuing up each side of the piece, with elements of red.	1955	Next to the ramp at the main entrance of the Faculty of Legal and Political Sciences	
Untitled mural	Red triangles on protruding angles, encircling the building	1955	The exterior walls of the auditorium of the Faculty of Humanities and Education, visible from the Tierra de Nadie	RT1
Untitled mural	A white tiled wall with thin black lines, reflective of patterns on computer motherboards, the lines are either straight or at 45 degree angles. There are also some lines of double thickness. It is found behind a partition wall.	1956	Ground floor of the Faculty of Architecture and Urbanism, by the ramp to the library	AU15
Untitled mural	A three part mural with a white background and sparse yellow and blue diagonal lines, though there are some straight lines on the pieces at the sides. The lines of the central mural converge in the center, where there appears to be an explosion of blue squares.	1956	By the entrance to the auditorium of the Faculty of Humanities and Education	RT2
Negativo and Positivo	Two murals, facing each other, one is white with several patterns using straight black lines, primarily vertical but in one patterned area there are some horizontal. The other mural features the same image, with the colors inverted.	1956	On the east and west walls at the main entrance of the Faculty of Humanities and Education	RT4 & RT3
Untitled mural	A large two-piece mural, with the pieces stacked. It has a cream background and various straight vertical lines in yellow and white.	1956	Behind the ramp, from the second floor down, in the Faculty of Legal and Political Sciences or School of Geography	
Dos obras mural en relieve	A mural with a white background and two feature elements protruding from the wall. These are designed with zigzag patterns, the zigzag lines being vertical and running across, with horizontal lines separating the pattern into different sections that are colored in shades of teal, yellow, orange, and black.	1956	Faculty of Humanities and Education	
Untitled mural	Several walls of white tile, with certain individual tiles being colored in a variety of bright shades	1956	School of Psychology building, FHE	
Untitled mural	A set of pale grey walls with uniform white squares in a grid pattern. One or two sides of each of the squares is highlighted in black.	1956	On the wall separating the library hall and the cafeteria on the ground floor of the Faculty of Architecture and Urbanism	AU14
Untitled mural	A three part mural, the two sides bearing the same image, flipped. This is a grey background with various white and yellow diagonal and vertical lines, and a black horizontal zigzag pattern from top to bottom. The central part is similar to the white half of his mural at the entrance of the Law and Politics building, but rotated 90 degrees counterclockwise and incorporating yellow and orange in replacement of black.	1956	Next to the stairs on the top floor of the Faculty of Legal and Political Sciences	
Untitled mural	Almost identical to his mural of three parts by the stairs on the top floor of the Faculty of Legal and Political Sciences, but the central part features more solid red shapes, and the sides have straight yellow and white horizontal and vertical lines with no diagonal ones	1956	On the ground floor of the Faculty of Legal and Political Sciences	
Untitled mural	Wooden panels of pieces running top to bottom in different shades of wood, larger pieces of paler wood mark the edges and separate the mural into three parts	1956	In the cafeteria on the ground floor of the Faculty of Architecture and Urbanism	AU13

=== Miguel Arroyo ===
Artworks by Miguel Arroyo in University City of Caracas
Work	Description	Year	Location	Map ref.
Untitled mural	A wooden wall with hundreds of deep, short notches cut in, pointing from top right to bottom left	1956	Taller Galia	AU7
Untitled mural		1956	Taller Galia	AU4
Untitled mural		1956	Taller Galia	AU6
Untitled mural	A marble wall with vertical stripes that are approximate to white, blue, black, grey and red	1956	Taller Galia	AU9
Untitled mural		1956	Taller Galia	AU10
Untitled mural		1956	Taller Galia	AU11
Muro Blanco/Indefinido y Modificable	A long wall of white with circular holes cut out in a grid formation. Several of these holes have stoppers, that fill but also stick out of the wall, and are re/movable.	1956	Taller Galia	AU5
Untitled mural	A black wall with circular bumps sticking out in a grid formation	1956	Taller Galia	AU8

=== Braulio Salazar ===
In 1953 Villanueva asked Salazar to produce a stained-glass window for the university.

Artworks by Braulio Salazar in University City of Caracas
Work	Description	Year	Location	Map ref.
Untitled stained-glass window	Twelve connected windows with various square and rectangular panes of colored glass forming an abstract geometric pattern	1956	On the wall of the auditorium in the Luis Razetti School of Medicine	H1

=== Jesús Rafael Soto ===
Artworks by Jesús Rafael Soto in University City of Caracas
Work	Description	Year	Location	Map ref.
Escultura Cinética. Hierro Policromado	An iron sculpture in an odd hard-line shape of many right angles, each protruding side, including in the middle, has bars of various colors running both straight and diagonally in both directions. It is black, blue, and white.	1956	Cafeteria garden of the Faculty of Architecture and Urbanism	AU16

=== Omar Carreño ===
Carreño designed the artwork and building of the entire interior and exterior of the Faculty of Dentistry; he is the only artist who contributed to the campus to create the works of an entire building alone.

Artworks by Omar Carreño in University City of Caracas
Work	Description	Year	Location	Map ref.
Policromías	Panels on the exterior walls of the Faculty of Dentistry, with one set of panels for each floor. On one side they are primarily grey, with a black stripe on the bottom and a white stripe on top of this. Atop these stripes is a red vertical stripe on the left or right side of the panel (dependent on which side of the building it is). On another wall are panels below the windows of the building, primarily white but with a red stripe directly beneath each window. The designs are repeated around the building, with the red stripe of the grey panels swapping side.	1957	Faculty of Dentistry	
Policromías	The roof murals of the Faculty of Dentistry, these are largely white with a thin black line offset to the right of the middle, running top to bottom, with the right side of the mural beyond this line being red	?	Faculty of Dentistry	
Artwork inside the Faculty of Dentistry building		?	Faculty of Dentistry	

=== Félix George ===
George was an established sculptor and doctor, who also taught at UCV until he died in 2019. As a head of department in the Faculty of Medicine, several of his sculptures were in the grounds where he worked.

Artworks by Félix George in University City of Caracas
Work	Description	Year	Location	Map ref.
Interángulos	Burgundy wing-like panels protruding from a wall at different angles	1958	At the main entrance of the Faculty of Economic and Social Sciences	
Diametro Espacial	A gold-colored metal circle that appears to have been sliced in half, with one semicircle hanging off the wall, but connected	1981	In the Deanery of the Faculty of Medicine	
Untitled sculpture	A bright yellow sculpture of different flat rectangular pieces stuck together		In the Deanery of the Faculty of Medicine	

=== Gego ===
One of Gego's sculptures is in the library building of the Faculty of Architecture and Urbanism.

Artworks by Gego in University City of Caracas
Work	Description	Year	Location	Map ref.
Chorro	"Aluminium rods and iron supports"	1974	The exhibition hall of the library of the Faculty of Architecture and Urbanism	AU18

=== Ernest Maragall i Noble ===
Artworks by Ernest Maragall in University City of Caracas
Work	Description	Year	Location	Map ref.
Monumento a los caídos de la generación del 28	A woman sits weeping, holding a memento in front of her	1978	In the Tierra de Nadie, up a slope near the entrance from Rectory Plaza	TN3

=== Guillermo Pinto ===
Artworks by Guillermo Pinto in University City of Caracas
Work	Description	Year	Location	Map ref.
Bust of Tobías Lasser	A bust of Tobías Lasser sits atop a small plinth; a large plaque in front dedicates the bust to Lasser, describes the man's association, and explains that Pinto created the bust at the request of Antonio Paris, the Rector at the time	2007	In the Botanical Garden, near the entrance to the Botanical Institute	B4

=== Ibelise Lagos ===
Artworks by Ibelise Lagos in University City of Caracas
Work	Description	Year	Location	Map ref.
Equilibrio	A sculpture of a headless and armless woman rocking backwards on a tall stool	1991	On a platform at the top of the staircase in the central library	L6

=== Oswaldo Lares ===
Artworks by Oswaldo Lares in University City of Caracas
Work	Description	Year	Location	Map ref.
Bust of Dr. Francisco Benazi	A bust of Francisco Benazi sits atop a cuboid plinth, which bears a plaque dedicating the plaza, explaining that Lares also designed the plaza with the botanical assistance of Leandro Aristeguieta	1995	In the Plaza Francisco Benazi of the Faculty of Sciences	

=== Pedro León Zapata ===
Pedro León Zapata created a giant mural for the campus, Conductores de Venezuela, constructed over several years and finished in 1999. It depicts historical Venezuelan figures, and normal people, driving.

Artworks by Pedro León Zapata in University City of Caracas
Work	Description	Year	Location	Map ref.
Conductores de Venezuela	A giant 165x11 metre mural depicting various Venezuelan leaders and historical figures driving motor vehicles, largely filled with dubious-looking people. The background is bright red, with the people and vehicles largely in shades of yellow, orange and green, with some blue. There is a sun in the middle.	1999	At the north of the campus, facing the Francisco Fajardo freeway, on a wall constructed for the mural as part of the Covered Gymnasium complex	S8

=== Oscar Olivares ===
Olivares designed and directed the painting of a mural in the Botanical Garden intended to renovate the space, he created it with the assistance of volunteers who had been clearing the gardens to make it healthier.

Artworks by Oscar Olivares in University City of Caracas
Work	Description	Year	Location	Map ref.
Untitled mural	Visually reflecting the flag of Venezuela, but "[t]he stars are shaped like birds and butterflies, the red stripe is orchids, the blue [is] trunks of trees and in the yellow tops of araguaney trees, Calder's Clouds and the UCV Clock converge"	2017	The entrance of the Botanical Garden	B1

== By international artists ==
=== Alexander Calder ===
In terms of the campus, Calder is most famous for his Floating Clouds, but in fact made four pieces for the campus: the acoustic panels, a mobile, and two sculptures.

Artworks by Alexander Calder in University City of Caracas
Work	Description	Year	Location	Map ref.
Floating Clouds/Nubes	Many large, colorful, panels with rounded edges but in various shapes. They are both artistic and give the hall some of the world's best acoustics.	1953	On the ceiling of the Aula Magna	A3
Ráfaga de nieve	A mobile of white disks, like a snow flurry	1953	Hanging over a multi-story open space inside the Faculty of Architecture and Urbanism	AU19
Stábil con hoja horizontal	A red, black, and yellow sculpture. It has a triad base and upwards protrusions of oars in the three colors, with yellow in the center appearing to 'hold' the other. The connecting rods are all red. On the bottom of the black-headed oar is a yellow oar head; on the bottom of the red-headed oar hangs a large flat black disk, parallel to the floor.	1955	Interior balcony of the Faculty of Architecture and Urbanism	AU21
Estalagmita	A tripod of two flat pieces leaning together; the piece with one leg is red, the piece with two is black. Hanging from the tip is a mobile bearing disks that are white and red.	1955	Interior balcony of the Faculty of Architecture and Urbanism	AU20

=== Henri Laurens ===
Henri Laurens created one work that is placed on the campus, L'Amphion.

Artworks by Henri Laurens in University City of Caracas
Work	Description	Year	Location	Map ref.
L'Amphion	A large sculpture on a cube plinth, depicting an amphibian-appearing figure with raised arms, a patterned underbelly, and thick tail. It has been described as dancing.	1953	At the northeastern corner of the Plaza Cubierta, by Léger's bimural, backing onto and visible from the Tierra de Nadie	PC2

=== Baltasar Lobo ===
Lobo created Maternidad, which sits on the campus.

Artworks by Baltasar Lobo in University City of Caracas
Work	Description	Year	Location	Map ref.
Maternidad	Two abstract figures, vaguely humanoid are connected. One is depicted with breasts, the other appears to be a child on 'her'.	1953	Western side of the Tierra de Nadie	TN1

=== Antoine Pevsner ===
One of Antoine Pevsner's Constructivist sculptures, this piece intends to show "unfolding movement in space" and "infinite surface development". This specifically shows a representation of diagonal movement with thrust at a 30° angle. It was designed in 1950/51.

Artworks by Antoine Pevsner in University City of Caracas
Work	Description	Year	Location	Map ref.
Projection dynamique dans l'espace au 30° degré	A brazed brass sculpture painted with bronzine, it features several twists in one solid piece and reflects the image of a solid rod diagonally wedged between a curved sheet that expands around the rod above and below	1953	In front of the cooling tower, behind the Central Library	PC12

=== Jean (Hans) Arp ===
Arp's 1954 sculpture known as the Berger des nuages, Pastor de nubes, or Cloud Shepherd, is a large abstract sculpture behind the Aula Magna.

He also made a relief mural for the campus, called Siluetas en relieve. The restoration of this mural was a complicated process because of how the shapes comprising the piece had been attached to the wall behind. It largely focused on maintaining the integrity of the original as it had been placed, removing salt stains and other damage acquired by exposure.

Artworks by Jean (Hans) Arp in University City of Caracas
Work	Description	Year	Location	Map ref.
Berger des nuages	Pure bronze sculpture of a pseudo-creature, with cloud-like lines denying its identity	1954	At the southwestern edge of the Plaza Cubierta, to the rear of the Aula Magna, in a small open-air square with Manaure's bimural and a small pool	PC8
Siluetas en relieve	A collection of abstract shapes made of aluminium sheets, with an aluminium skeleton underneath that connects to rods holding the shapes to its concrete wall; the wall is coated with layers of white paint	1956	Indoor courtyard of the Psychology Library; next to Taeuber-Arp's Sonoridad	

=== André Bloc ===
Bloc's mural's location is now a Bank of Venezuela.

Artworks by André Bloc in University City of Caracas
Work	Description	Year	Location	Map ref.
Untitled mural	A mural of tiles in bright colors, with three-dimensional features in equally bright colors. All elements are different shapes, some spiky and some curved.	1954	Former mail room in the Communications building; now a location of the Bank of Venezuela	R9

=== Fernand Léger ===
Artworks by Fernand Léger in University City of Caracas
Work	Description	Year	Location	Map ref.
Untitled bimural	A curved mural with a different piece on each side, the apex of the curve points away from the Plaza Cubierta and towards L'Amphion. On this side is a yellow, blue, and red mural with white elements; over the yellow are red tridents pointing outwards on both sides, with a blue 'u' shape offset to the right of center, another blue shape appears to be underneath an element of white offset to the left of center. On the other side are two images of green, orange, red, and an earthy yellow. The image on the left appears to be a Cubist rendering of a bird, the image on the right one of a snake or similar.	1954	At the northeast of the Plaza Cubierta, next to L'Amphion	PC3
Untitled stained-glass window	A large stained-glass window; a blue background appears to have red flames on its left and yellow stems on its right. Across the image are green squashed circle shapes. The panes of glass are irregularly designed.	1954	East wall of a Central Library corridor, inwards-facing	L7

=== Victor Vasarely ===
Artworks by Victor Vasarely in University City of Caracas
Work	Description	Year	Location	Map ref.
Sophia	A three piece mural of white background and black lines, appearing to be stripes showing reverberation. It is said to reflect the functional grilles on the building that are directly below each of the three panels.	1954	The east wall of the cooling tower	PC11
+ - (Positif-Negatif)	A 'wall' of metal panels hanging vertically, some of which are sectioned to have pieces positioned on a different angle to the rest of the stripe, creating the effect of geometric shapes appearing when viewed from different positions. It is placed below a pentagonal gap to allow sunlight through the panels.	1954	Plaza Cubierta, outside the Sala de Conciertos	PC6
Hommage à Malevitch	A curved bimural with a yellow, orange and brown pattern of geometric shapes. It is the same pattern on both sides, but reversed on one so as the give the effect it is a single piece. At one edge (the one not on the patch of grass) is a square section that is entirely yellow on one side of the wall and entirely black on the other, with a smaller square within this appearing to be cut out and wedged back in diagonally, hanging by two corners within the frame. On the yellow side, this cut-out is black, and the other way round for the black side.	1954	Roughly the center of the Plaza Cubierta	PC4

=== Sophie Taeuber-Arp ===
Artworks by Sophie Taeuber-Arp in University City of Caracas
Work	Description	Year	Location	Map ref.
Sonoridad	A tiled mural that is largely white, but featuring patterns of tiles in red, black, grey, and blue. The patterns reflect reaching for the middle of the piece.	1955	Indoor courtyard of the Psychology Library; next to Arp's Siluetas en relieve	

=== Wifredo Lam ===
Artworks by Wifredo Lam in University City of Caracas
Work	Description	Year	Location	Map ref.
Untitled mural	On a pale green background is a bright flowery tropical pattern of yellow, pink, dark green and black with some white. On top of these is a three dimensional relief of a similar flowery nature, predominantly in the same pale green of the background but with yellow, pink, and white parts.	1957	In the Botanical Institute	B3

=== Pablo Toscano ===
Artworks by Pablo Toscano in University City of Caracas
Work	Description	Year	Location	Map ref.
Triunfo del trópico	A large wall painting of a leafy green bundle emerging from the sea, sprouting colorful flowers, birds, and fishes in all directions	1998	In the Alfonso Gamero library of the Faculty of Sciences	SC2

== Map of artworks ==
Map of artworks in University City of Caracas
Click on a dot to show that artwork in the complete list below
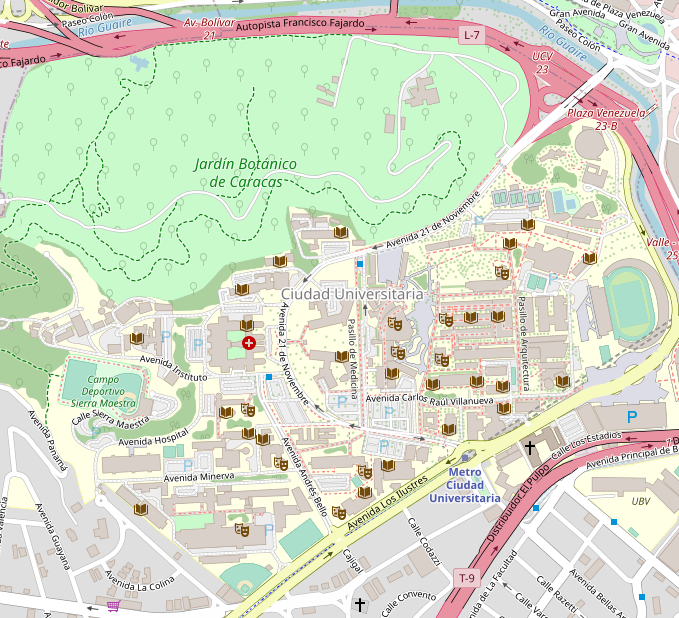

== Complete list ==
Image	Artist	Work	Year	Map ref.
	Indigenous people of Venezuela	El primer libro	ancient	L5
	Francisco Narváez	Mural	1950	H5
	Francisco Narváez	Cristo	1950	H13
	Francisco Narváez	La educación	1950	H6
	Francisco Narváez	Mural	1950-51	H12
	Carlos González Bogen	Mural	1951	S2
	Mateo Manaure	Mural	1951	S3
	Armando Barrios	Mural	1951	S4
	Mateo Manaure	Mural	1951	S5
	Carlos González Bogen	Mural	1951	S6
	Armando Barrios	Mural	1951	S7
	Francisco Narváez	Mural	1951	C1
	Francisco Narváez	La ciencia	1951	H11
	Francisco Narváez	El Atleta	1951-52	S1
	Alejandro Colina	María Lionza	1951	S9
	Francisco Narváez	Sculpture of José Gregorio Hernández	1953	H4
	Armando Barrios	Mural	1953	R8
	Alexander Calder	Nubes	1953	A3
	Carlos González Bogen	Mural	1953	L8
	Henri Laurens	L'Amphion	1953^{:359}	PC2
	Baltasar Lobo	Maternidad	1953^{:359}	TN1
	Antoine Pevsner	Projection dynamique dans l'espace au 30° degré	1953^{:359}	PC12
	Héctor Poleo	Fresco mural	1953-54	R1
	Carlos Raúl Villanueva & Juan Otaola Paván	UCV Clock Tower	1953	R11
	Jean (Hans) Arp	Berger des nuages	1954 (other sources 1953)	PC8
	Carlos González Bogen	Mural	1953 or 1954	A2
	André Bloc	Mural	1954	R9
	Pedro León Castro	Fechas Magnas de la Universidad	1954	R3
	Fernand Léger	Bi-Mural	1954^{:359}	PC3
	Fernand Léger	Stained-glass window	1954^{:359}	L7
	Mateo Manaure	Mural	1954	L4
	Mateo Manaure	Mural	1954	PC7
	Mateo Manaure	Mural	1954	TN2
	Mateo Manaure	Mural	1954	PC1
	Mateo Manaure	Murals of the Hospital	1954	
	Mateo Manaure	Hospital facade	1954	
	Mateo Manaure	Bimural	1954	PC9
	Mateo Manaure	Acoustic frames	1954	PC14
	Mateo Manaure	Stained-glass windows	1954	PC10
	Mateo Manaure	Mural	1954	A1
	Mateo Manaure	Murals of the Faculty of Engineering	1954	
	Francisco Narváez	La cultura	1954	R10
	Pascual Navarro	Curved mural	1954	PC5
	Pascual Navarro	Mural	1954	PC13
	Pascual Navarro	Mural	1954	L1
	Alírio Oramas	Progresión rítmica en tres movimientos	1954	L3
	Alírio Oramas	Variación en 36 colores	1954	L2
	Alejandro Otero	Stained-glass window	1954	
	Alejandro Otero	Mural	1954	
	Alejandro Otero	Mural	1954	
	Alejandro Otero	Mural	1954	
	Victor Vasarely	Sophia	1954^{:359}	PC11
	Victor Vasarely	+ - (Positif-Negatif)	1954^{:359}	PC6
	Victor Vasarely	Hommage à Malevitch (bimural)	1954^{:359}	PC4
	Oswaldo Vigas	Composición Estática-Composición Dinámica	1954	R7
	Oswaldo Vigas	Un Elemento Estático en Cinco Posiciones	1954	R6
	Oswaldo Vigas	Un Elemento – personaje vertical en evolución horizontal	1954	R2
	Oswaldo Vigas	Un Elemento – personaje triple	1954	R4
	Alexander Calder	Ráfaga de nieve	1955	AU19
	Alexander Calder	Stábil con hoja horizontal	1955 (Note: In this image, on the far side of the balcony is one of Valera's murals (right) and an unknown sculpture (left). Part of Calder's Ráfaga de nieve is seen on the far left.)	AU21
	Alexander Calder	Estalagmita	1955	AU20
	Sophie Taeuber-Arp	Sonoridad	1955	
	Victor Valera	Mural	1955	
	Victor Valera	Mural	1955^{:89}	RT1
	Mateo Manaure	La pared de ciencias	1955	SC1
	Miguel Arroyo	Mural	1956	AU7
	Miguel Arroyo	Mural	1956	AU4
	Miguel Arroyo	Mural	1956	AU6
	Miguel Arroyo	Mural	1956	AU9
	Miguel Arroyo	Mural	1956	AU10
	Miguel Arroyo	Mural	1956	AU11
	Miguel Arroyo	Muro blanco/Indefinido y modificable	1956	AU5
	Miguel Arroyo	Mural	1956	AU8
	Mateo Manaure	Mural	1956	AU12
	Mateo Manaure	Mural	1956	AU3
	Francisco Narváez	Torso	1956	AU2
	Francisco Narváez	Mural	1956	B2
	Alirio Oramas	Mural	1956	AU17
	Alejandro Otero	Mural	1956	AU1
	Braulio Salazar	Stained-glass window	1956	H1
	Jesús Rafael Soto	Escultura Cinética. Hierro Policromado	1956	AU16
	Jean (Hans) Arp (other sources Sophie Taeuber-Arp)	Siluetas en relieve	1956	
	Victor Valera	Mural	1956	AU15
	Victor Valera	Mural	1956	RT2
	Victor Valera	Negativo & Positivo	1956	RT4 & RT3
	Victor Valera	Mural	1956	
	Victor Valera	Dos obras mural en relieve	1956	
	Victor Valera	Mural	1956	
	Victor Valera	Mural	1956	AU14
	Victor Valera	Mural	1956	
	Victor Valera	Mural	1956	
	Victor Valera	Mural	1956	AU13
	Omar Carreño	Policromías	1957	
	Wifredo Lam	Mural	1957	B3
	Alejandro Otero	Mural	1957	
	Félix George	Interángulos	1958	
	Harry Abend	Homenaje al Maestro Villanueva	1973	AU22
	Gego	Chorro	1974	AU18
	Ernest Maragall	Monumento a los caídos de la generación del 28	1978	TN3
	Félix George	Diametro Espacial	1981	
	Francisco Narváez	Dr. José María Vargas	1987	R5
	Ibelise Lagos	Equilibrio	1991	L6
	Oswaldo Lares	Bust of Dr. Francisco Benazi	1995	
	Pedro León Zapata	Los Conductores de Venezuela	1996-2000	S8
	Mateo Manaure	Construcción cromática	1998	
	Pablo Toscano	Triunfo del trópico	1998	SC2
	?	Mural	2000	
	Guillermo Pinto	Bust of Tobías Lasser	2007	B4
	Oscar Olivares	Mural	2017	B1
	Harry Abend	Sculpture	?	
	Alejandro Otero	Tres murales en policromías		
	Omar Carreño	Policromías		
	Félix George	Sculpture		
