= List of World Heritage Sites in Venezuela =

Location of World Heritage Sites in Venezuela

The United Nations Educational, Scientific and Cultural Organization (UNESCO) World Heritage Sites are places of importance to cultural or natural heritage as described in the UNESCO World Heritage Convention, established in 1972. Cultural heritage consists of monuments (such as architectural works, monumental sculptures, or inscriptions), groups of buildings, and sites (including archaeological sites). Natural features (consisting of physical and biological formations), geological and physiographical formations (including habitats of threatened species of animals and plants), and natural sites which are important from the point of view of science, conservation, or natural beauty, are defined as natural heritage. The Bolivarian Republic of Venezuela accepted the convention on 30 October 1990. There are three World Heritage Sites in the country, with a further three on the tentative list.

The first site in Venezuela added to the list was Coro and its Port, in 1993. The site has been listed as endangered since 2005 because of the damage caused by heavy rains in the previous year and because of new constructions that threaten the integrity of the property. The most recent site listed was the Ciudad Universitaria de Caracas, in 2000. Coro and the Ciudad Universitaria are cultural sites while the Canaima National Park, listed in 1994, is a natural site.

== World Heritage Sites ==
UNESCO lists sites under ten criteria; each entry must meet at least one of the criteria. Criteria i through vi are cultural, and vii through x are natural.

† In danger

World Heritage Sites
Site	Image	Location (state)	Year listed	UNESCO data	Description
Coro and its Port†	A church with a blue facade with white columns	Falcón	1993	658; iv, v (cultural)	Founded in 1527 by the Spanish as one of the first colonial settlements in the region, the city of Coro and its port, La Vela, have preserved their urban layout and numerous historical buildings. The buildings are made in the bahareque technique (using interwoven bamboo sticks or reeds, covered by mud), adobe, and rammed earth. Architecturally, the older buildings are in Spanish and Mudéjar styles while those from the second half of the 17th century onwards were influenced by the Dutch style. Since 2005, the site has been listed as endangered because of damage caused by heavy rains in the previous year and because of new constructions that threaten the integrity of the property.
Canaima National Park	A very tall waterfall in tropical setting	Bolívar	1994	701; vii, viii, ix, x (natural)	The outstanding features of the national park are the tepui, table-top mountains or mesas that have been created through hundreds of millions of years of erosion. Due to isolation, the summits of the tepui are inhabited by numerous endemic animal and plant species. Among many waterfalls in the park, Angel Falls (pictured) is the world's tallest uninterrupted waterfall with a vertical fall of around 1,000 m (3,300 ft).
Ciudad Universitaria de Caracas	A modernist sculpture and a mural	Capital District	2000	986; i, iv (cultural)	The University City was built between 1940 and 1960, following the designs of the architect Carlos Raúl Villanueva. The complex includes numerous structures and art installations, including a stadium, the Aula Magna auditorium with the sculpture of Floating Clouds, and a botanical garden. It represents an outstanding example of modern architecture, in this case adjusted for the tropical climate of the region. The Berger des Nuages sculpture is pictured.

== Tentative list ==
In addition to sites inscribed on the World Heritage List, member states can maintain a list of tentative sites that they may consider for nomination. Nominations for the World Heritage List are only accepted if the site was previously listed on the tentative list. Venezuela lists three properties on its tentative list.

Tentative sites
Site	Image	Location (state)	Year listed	UNESCO criteria	Description
City of "La Guaira"	A long historical building with decorations in front	La Guaira	1999	1306; ii, iii, iv, v (cultural)	La Guaira was founded in the late 16th century as the port of Caracas. It was connected to the capital by a road that was the centre of development. In the 18th century, fortifications were constructed to protect the city from pirates. In 1812, the city was hit by an earthquake and several houses were rebuilt in colonial style. The House of Guipuzcoana is pictured.
Hacienda Chuao (Chuao Plantation)	Cacao drying square in front of church	Aragua	2002	1635; (mixed)	Chuao was founded in the 16th century. The village is surrounded by cacao plantations, and production has been going on for over 400 years. Initially, the plantations were worked by African slaves. Their descendants still live in the village and maintain their traditions with festivals, music, and costumes. Several buildings from the colonial era have been preserved, although the village suffered damage in the 1812 earthquake.
Ciudad Bolivar in the narrowness of the Orinoco River	A city, behind a river with a bridge	Bolívar, Anzoátegui	2003	1804; (mixed)	The nomination covers the area along the part where the Orinoco River passes through granite formations and reaches one of the narrowest parts of the stream, around 800 m (2,600 ft), as compared to 6 km (3.7 mi) on average otherwise. The river is home to two species of river dolphins. The cultural landscape along the river was shaped by the pre-Columbian societies and in the colonial and republican times. Ciudad Bolívar, known as Angostura until 1846, was an important military base during the independence process and has buildings influenced by different architectural styles.

== See also ==
- List of Intangible Cultural Heritage elements in Venezuela
