= Conductores de Venezuela =

1999 mural by Pedro León Zapata

Coordinates: 10°29′41.2″N 66°53′10.8″W

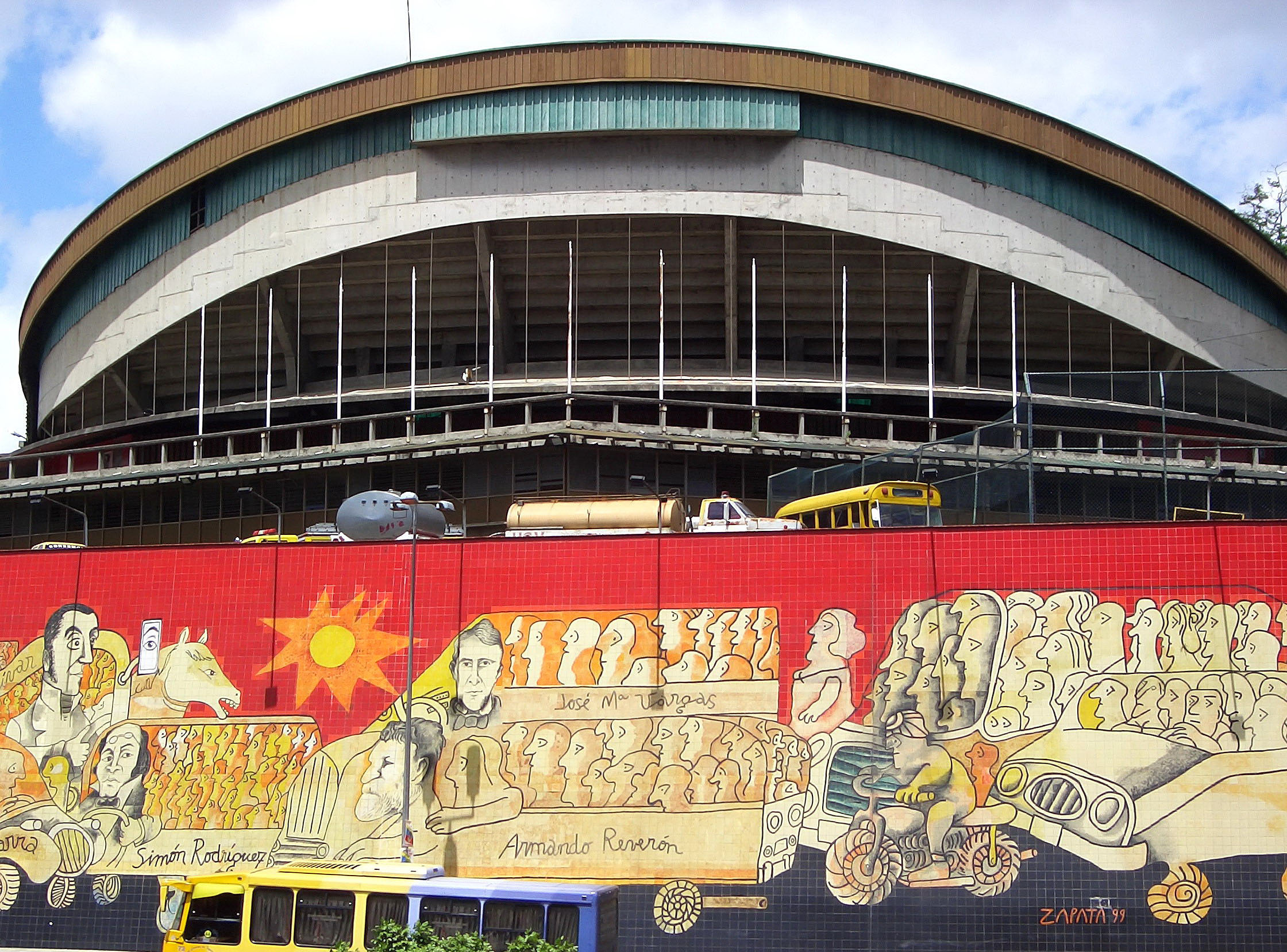
- Part of the mural, with the Covered Gymnasium behind.
- Artist: Pedro León Zapata
- Year: 1999
- Owner: Central University of Venezuela

Conductores de Venezuela is a giant ceramic mural on a wall outside the Covered Gymnasium at the Central University of Venezuela, facing out to the Francisco Fajardo freeway. It was designed by cartoonist Pedro León Zapata and installed over a period of years in the late 1990s; it depicts cartoon Venezuelan people driving, with several vehicles having important Venezuelans from history behind the wheel.

== Background ==
The Venezuelan architect and designer Carlos Raúl Villanueva began designing the Central University of Venezuela (UCV)'s University City of Caracas campus in the 1940s, beginning construction in the 1950s during a time of prevailing modernism in Latin America. Villanueva had a stylistic ideology for the project he called the "Synthesis of the Arts", combining the arts and architecture and creating artistic pieces that could also serve functional purposes. Villanueva died in 1975, before Pedro León Zapata began work on Conductores de Venezuela. Zapata was a cartoonist, working for newspaper El Nacional for 50 years, and had also been trained as a painter and muralist. His artwork was characteristically critical of the government, and he often depicted the everyday reality of life for regular Venezuelans. In 2005, he was awarded a PhD by UCV, where he was also a professor.

== Design and construction ==
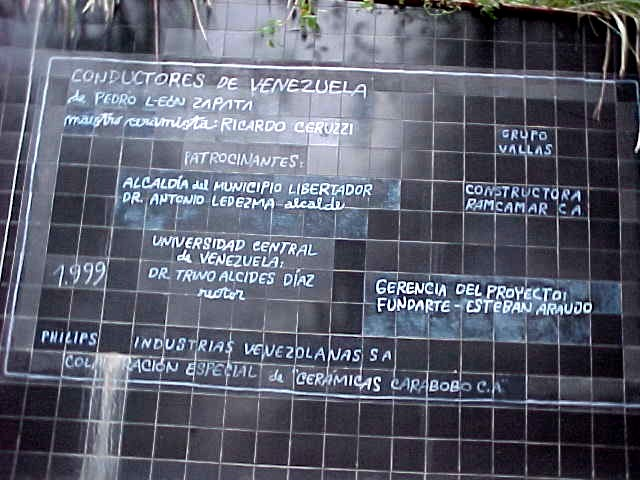
Part of the design includes a list of 'credits' for the work.

Zapata developed his own mural method, which he used for the work, when he was a student of Diego Rivera in Mexico. He was commissioned by the municipal mayor Antonio Ledezma and the university. In a 2008 interview, Zapata said that they promoted him as the mural's artist by referring to him as a painter but that they secretly wanted him to make it a cartoon, and so he resolved to make it "a caricature done by a painter". He also said that he "wanted to entertain drivers stuck in traffic".

The mural is made of 45,000 stoneware tiles, each 20 x 20 cm, cooked at the Pienme plant by ceramist Ricardo Ceruzzi, using single-firing furnaces. It was installed by the company Cerámica Carabobo. It is 165 metres long and 11 metres tall and has experienced deterioration since its construction but has also been the focus of restorers due to being large and popular.

The name translates to "drivers of Venezuela", with the mural depicting historic figures like Simón Bolívar, Simón Rodríguez, Teresa de la Parra, Armando Reverón, and José María Vargas driving vehicles.

== Response ==
The mural marks the boundary of the University City of Caracas campus at its northeast and was installed in 1998 and 1999. It is sometimes called Conductores del país and is described as an "open-air gallery" that gives residents of Caracas a "sense of belonging". Zapata said that the mural belongs to all of Caracas, but he loved it dearly himself and said that it was one of the largest murals in Latin America not just in size but for giving him the chance to bring some color to the university he loves, adding that it "took over [his] heart".

Dr. Silvio Llanos de la Hoz commented on the mural, writing that it does not reflect the Synthesis of the Arts in the way the rest of the campus artworks do, and that its message did not have a Kandinsky influence but was more concerned with Venezuela's social present at the time.

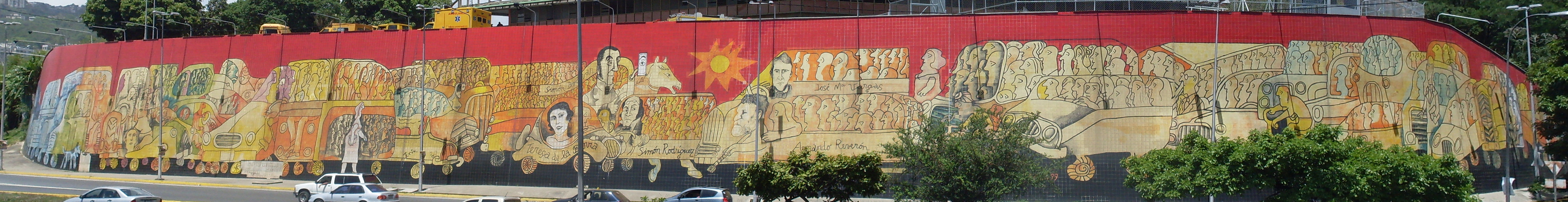
Panoramic view of the mural in 2015
