= L'Amphion =

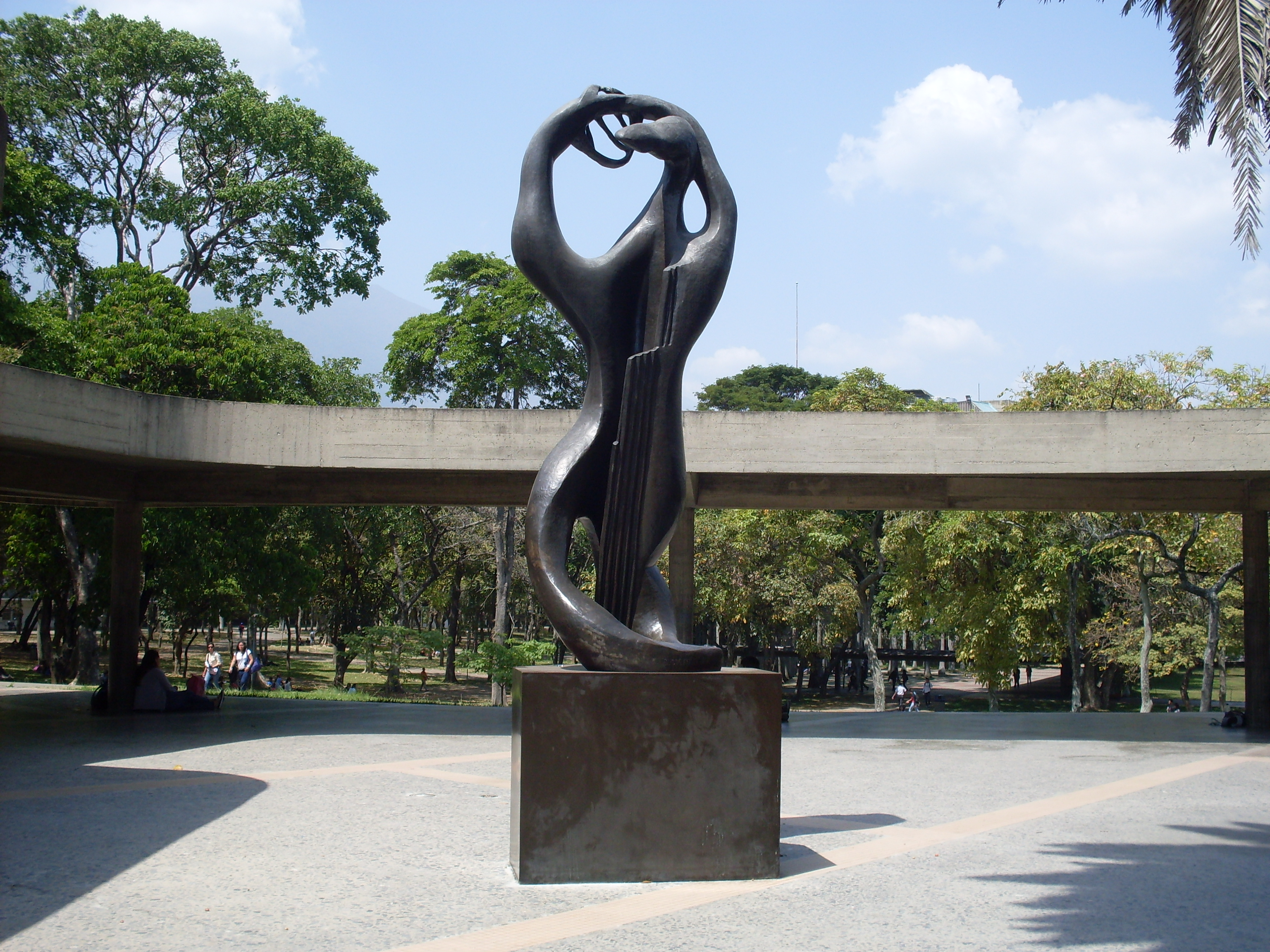
- Artist: Henri Laurens
- Year: 1953
- Dimensions: over 4 metres cm
- Location: Dallas Museum of Art (copy); Caracas
- Owner: Central University of Venezuela

L'Amphion ("The Amphion") is a work of art by French sculptor and illustrator Henri Laurens, located in the Plaza Cubierta of the University City of Caracas. It is described as his "most famous sculpture". The shape is based on Amphion, a lyre-playing hero from Greek mythology.

== Background ==
The Venezuelan architect and designer Carlos Raúl Villanueva began designing the University City of Caracas campus in the 1940s, beginning construction in the 1950s during a time of prevailing Modernism in Latin America.

Villanueva hired many artists from around the world to contribute works to the campus, including Laurens. (Note: See his entry in the list of campus artworks.) Laurens had not had formal art training, and began his career as a stonemason, exploring Cubism from around 1912.

== Design and construction ==
Villanueva reportedly asked, in 1952, for Laurens to build him something "tremendous" for his campus project; later that year, he began creating L'Amphion. The sculpture is over 4 metres tall and rendered in bronze, sitting on top of a stone block.

Laurens died in 1954, shortly after completing L'Amphion. A copy of the sculpture exists at the Dallas Museum of Art.

== Appearance ==
L'Amphion is seen as a product of Laurens' development of style, an evolution between Cubist and curvilinear art forms. It is also indicative of the female form that many of Laurens' more curving sculptures represent. Though made of bronze, the sculpture is a "grayish-black" shade. The consistency of the material is solid, except for an area on the front where there are decorative stripes on the 'belly'. Annette Labedzki refers to the sculpture as a feminine form, but with smooth curves that give "a mermaid like appearance", and describes it as having "its two hands raised and joined to form a circular shape, resembling a dancing gesture".

== See also ==
- List of artworks in University City of Caracas
