= List of Intangible Cultural Heritage elements in Venezuela =

Location of Venezuela

The United Nations Educational, Scientific and Cultural Organization (UNESCO) defines intangible cultural heritage elements as non-physical traditions and practices performed by a people. As part of a country's cultural heritage, they include celebrations, festivals, performances, oral traditions, music, and the making of handicrafts. The term intangible cultural heritage is formally established by the Convention for the Safeguarding of the Intangible Cultural Heritage, which was drafted in 2003 and took effect in 2006. The inscription of new heritage elements on UNESCO's Intangible Cultural Heritage Lists for protection and safeguarding is determined by the Intergovernmental Committee for the Safeguarding of Intangible Cultural Heritage, an organization established by the Convention. Venezuela ratified the Convention on 12 April 2007. It served on the Intangible Cultural Heritage Committee from 2008 to 2010.

National lists are required by the Convention for the further nomination of elements to the UNESCO lists.

== Intangible Cultural Heritage of Humanity ==
UNESCO's Intangible Cultural Heritage of Humanity consists of three lists: the Representative List of the Intangible Cultural Heritage of Humanity, the List of Intangible Cultural Heritage in Need of Urgent Safeguarding, and the Register of Good Safeguarding Practices. Venezuela has elements inscribed in the three lists.

† Transnational element

=== Representative List ===
This list aims to represent the intangible cultural heritage of Venezuela worldwide and bring awareness to its significance.

Intangible Cultural Heritage elements recognized by UNESCO
Name	Media	Year	No.	Description
Venezuela's Dancing Devils of Corpus Christi	A Dancing Devils of Yare mask	2012	00639	
La Parranda de San Pedro de Guarenas y Guatire		2013	00907	
Traditional knowledge and technologies relating to the growing and processing of the curagua		2015	01094	
Carnival of El Callao, a festive representation of a memory and cultural identity		2016	01198	
Festive cycle around the devotion and worship towards Saint John the Baptist		2021	01682	
Traditional knowledge and practices for the making and consumption of cassava bread † (Note: Shared with Cuba, the Dominican Republic, Honduras, and Haiti)		2024	02118	
Joropo in Venezuela	Street musicians in Caracas play joropo on the Venezuelan arpa.	2025	02092	

=== Need of Urgent Safeguarding ===
This list covers elements that are endangered and thus require appropriate safeguarding.

Endangered elements recognized by UNESCO
Name	Media	Year	No.	Description
Mapoyo oral tradition and its symbolic reference points within their ancestral territory		2014	00983	
Colombian-Venezuelan llano work songs † (Note: Shared with Colombia.)		2017	01285	

=== Register of Good Safeguarding Practices ===
This list accredits programs and projects that safeguard intangible cultural heritage and express the principles of the Convention.

Good Safeguarding Practices recognized by UNESCO
Name	Media	Year	No.	Description
Biocultural programme for the safeguarding of the tradition of the Blessed Palm in Venezuela		2019	01464	
Program for the safeguarding of the Bandos and Parrandas of the Holy Innocents of Caucagua: nuclei of initiation and transmission of wisdoms and community councils		2023	01856	

== See also ==
- List of World Heritage Sites in Venezuela
- Culture of Venezuela
- Tourism in Venezuela
