= List of hospitals in Venezuela =

This is a list of hospitals in Venezuela.

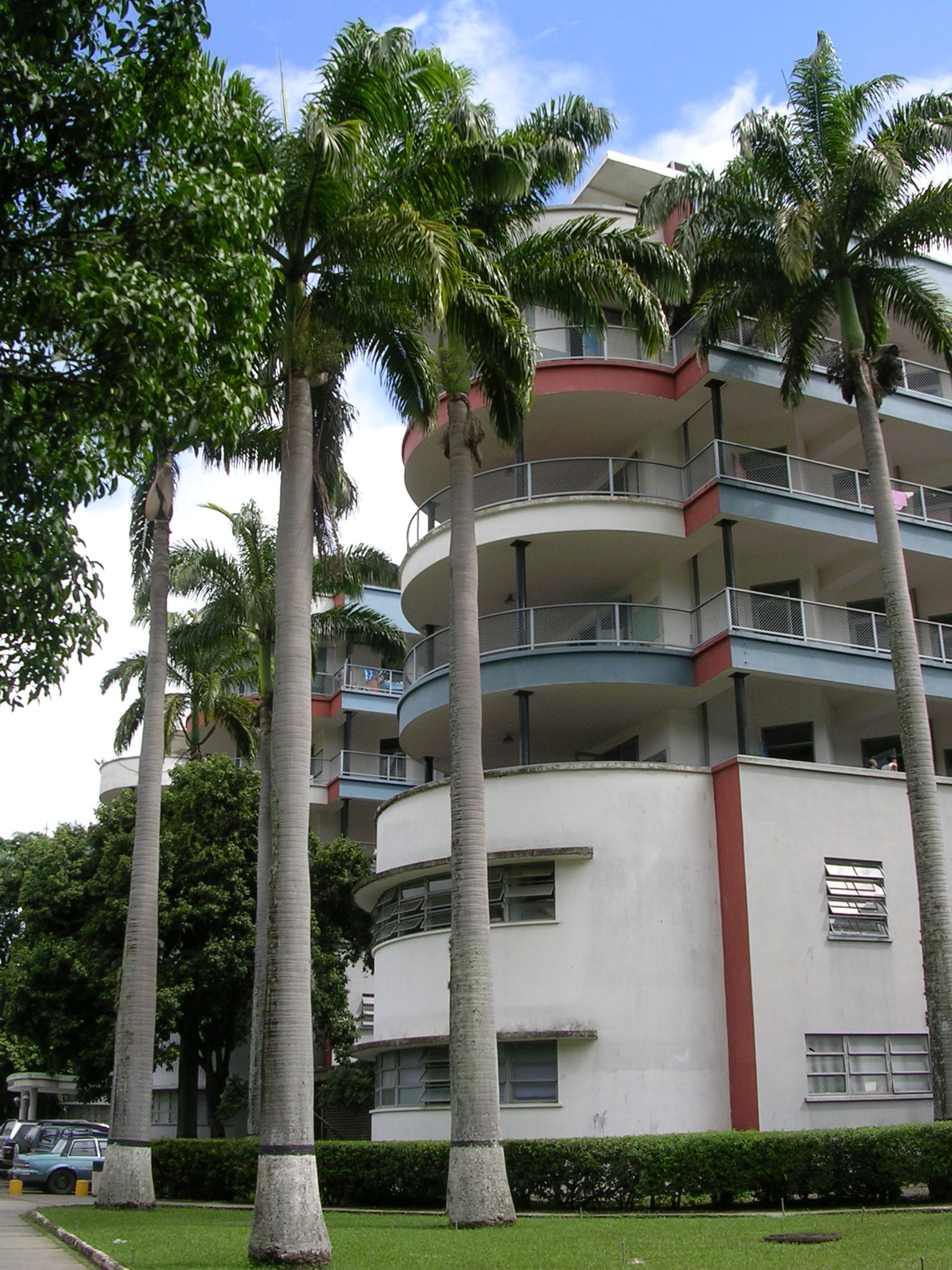
Hospital Clínico Universitario, Central University of Venezuela

== Aragua ==
- Hospital Central de Maracay

== Barinas ==
- Hospital Luis Razetti - Barinas

== Caracas ==
- Hospital Clínicas Caracas - Caracas
- Centro Médico de Caracas
- Hospital Dr. José María Vargas
- Hospital Clínico Universitario
- Hospital de Niños J. M. de los Ríos
- Hospital Domingo Luciani
- Hospital Dr. José Gregorio Hernández
- Hospital "Miguel Perez Carreño"
- Hospital Médico Quirúrgico "Dr. Ricardo Baquero Gonzalez"
- Hospital Psiquiatrico de Caracas
- Hospital Periférico de Coche "Leopoldo Manrique Terrero"
- Centro Medico Docente La Trinidad - Caracas
- Hospital General Lidice Jesús Yerena - Caracas
- Hospital Dr. Perez de León
- Hospital Dr. José Ignacio Baldó
- Hospital Militar "Dr. Carlos Arvelo"
- Hospital Militar "Dr. Vicente Salias"

== Carabobo ==
- Ciudad Hospitalaria "Dr. Enrique Tejera"
- Hospital Central "Dr. Ramon Madariaga"
- Hospital de Clinica "San Augustin"

== Guárico ==
- Hospital Rafael Zamora Arevalo
- Hospital General William Lara
- Hospital Dr. Israel Ranuarez Balza

== Sucre ==
- Hospital Ruiz & Paez

== Zulia ==
- Hospital Universitario de Maracaibo

== Notes ==
- For a complete list, see https://web.archive.org/web/20180929231253/http://www.paginasamarillascantv.com.ve/, at "Clasificación" > "Clínicas y Hospitales" > "Ciudad" > "Todas las Ciudades". There are about 2,018 clinics and hospitals in Venezuela, including 634 in Caracas, 195 in Maracaibo, 173 in Valencia, and 92 in Barquisimeto.
