= Snow Flurry (design) =

Mobile design by Alexander Calder

- Ráfaga de nieve (Spanish)
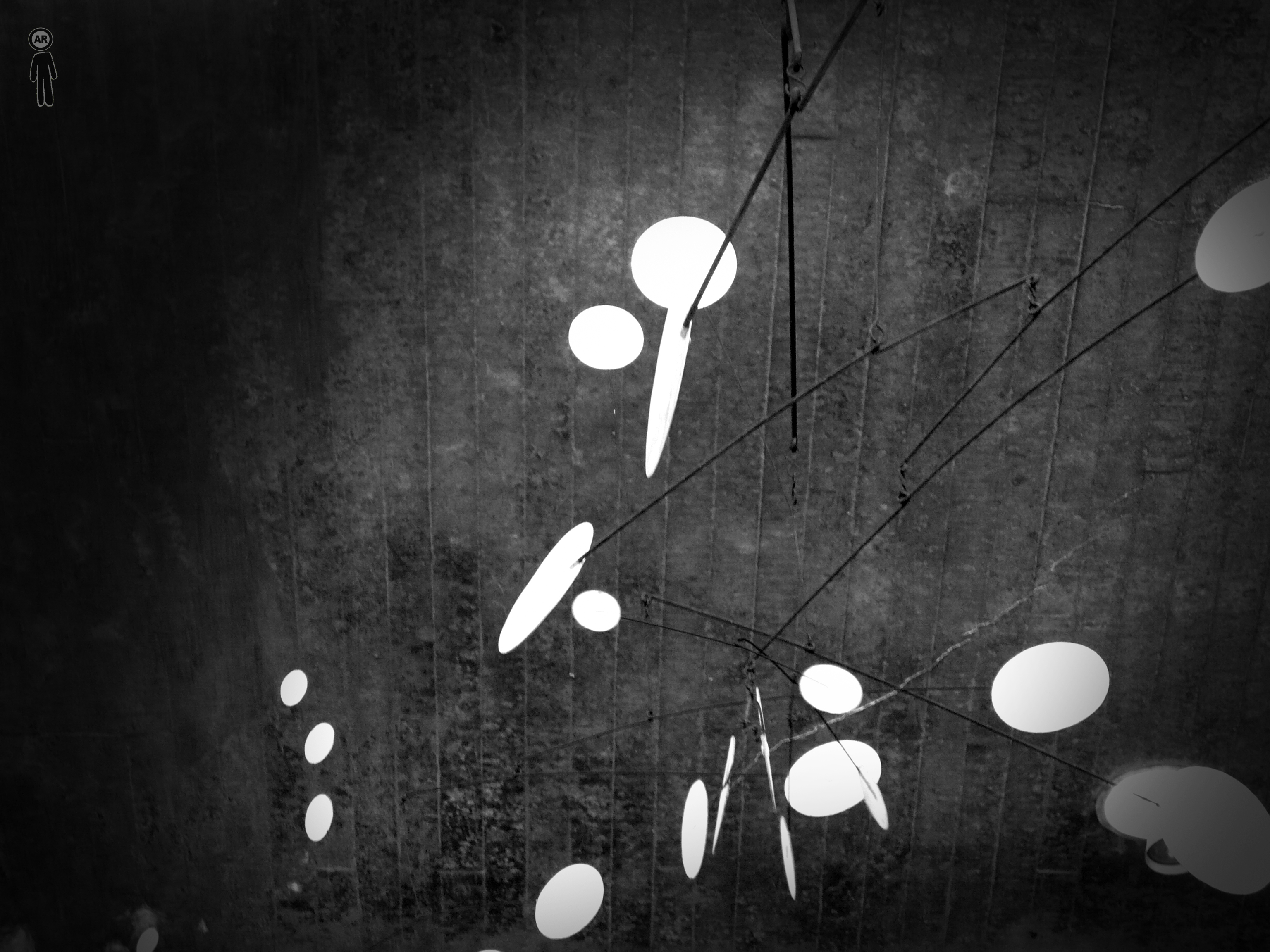
- The Ráfaga de nieve mobile in 2007, one of at least seven works of this topic
- Artist: Alexander Calder
- Year: 1948–1959
- Location: Museum of Modern Art; Museu de Arte Contemporânea da Universidade de São Paulo; Portland Museum of Art; Museum of Contemporary Art, Chicago; University City of Caracas; Denver Art Museum

The Snow Flurry design was used by American artist Alexander Calder for at least seven mobiles between 1948 and 1959. A monumental design composed of white disks of varying sizes are connected on different branches and levels to reflect a snow flurry in Calder's distinct Modernist style.

The 1950 mobile was famously owned by the Noyes family before its 2012 sale fetched over $10 million and made it the most expensive hanging mobile ever sold. This mobile is owned privately, while the 1955 Ráfaga de nieve mobile is a permanent fixture at the Central University of Venezuela, and the others are displayed in museums.

== Design ==
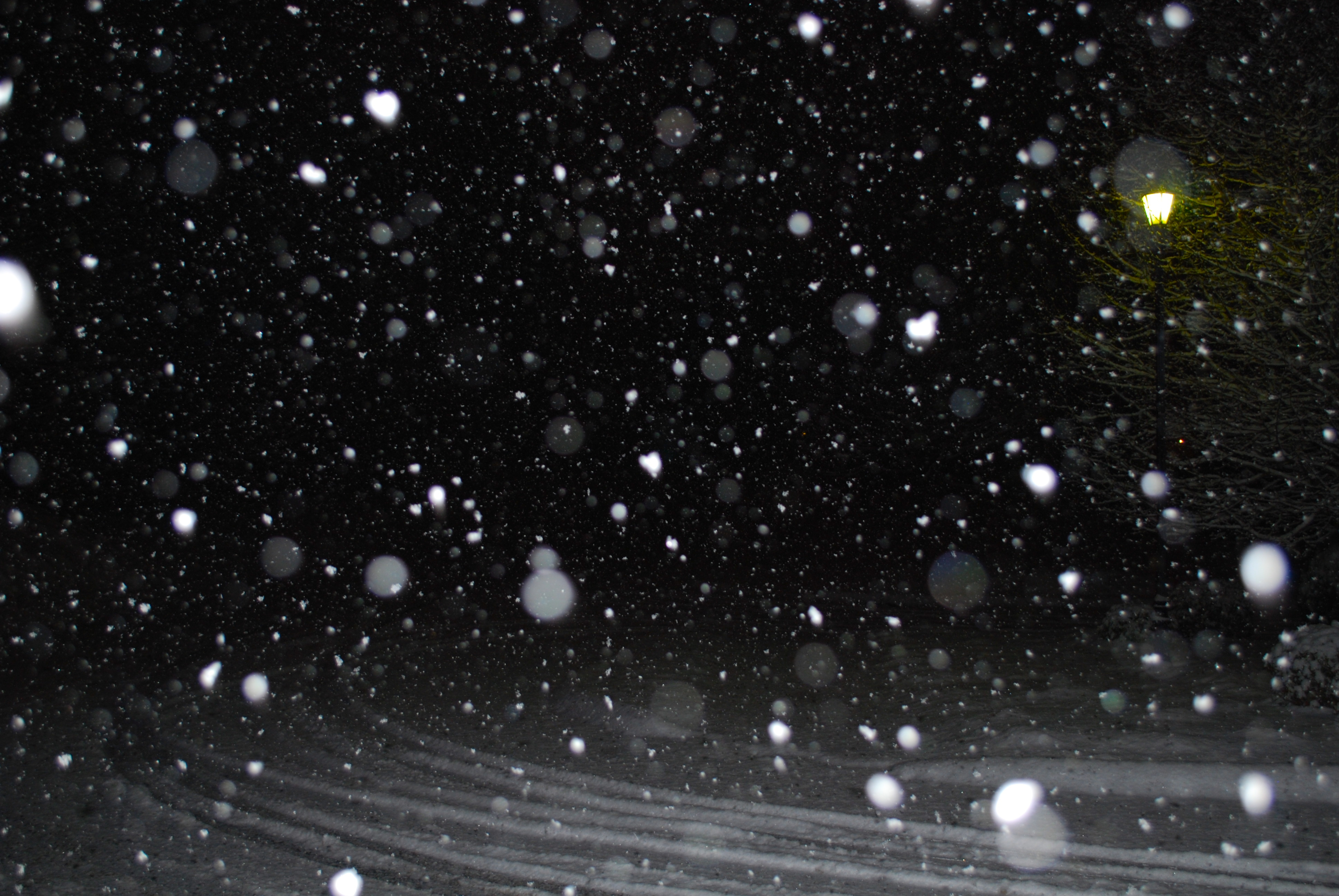
A snow flurry

The design, called a "cascade of white discs", is based on snowfall that artist Alexander Calder experienced from his home in Roxbury, Connecticut. It also bears similarities to Calder's 1946 Blizzard (Roxbury Flurry), which is considered a sister work. Another similar Calder mobile is the 1961 Nineteen White Discs. A New Statesman review says that the title Snow Flurry makes sense, but that on first sight it "looked ... like a great cabbage white, complete with proboscis, tendrils, aerials and those paned butterfly wings in every unadorned wire".

The Modernist design comprises "a series of different sized, circular white discs delicately hanging from twig like wire branches, casting shadows ... and slowly turning". The mobiles are all "practically the same", using white painted sheet metal and dark metal wire. The sizes of the circular discs get smaller the further from the apex they are; the mobile is structured in a pyramid formation. As a whole, it can rotate a full 360 degrees, but the various branches are restricted as to how far they can turn independently. Described as "evocative" in a HuffPost review, the mobile is intended to move when breezes take it so "the flurries float like light snowflakes"; the movement and the shadows produced by the mobile add to the visual appeal.

Talking about one of the Snow Flurry mobiles at the Beyeler Foundation in 2012, Calder's son said:

You'll see that the movement of the mobile is gesture, of course, it's gesture before abstract expressionism. It is all about gesture. If you start to study the assembly of the sculpture, you see the white disks, the different scales [...] And if you start to follow it, it's almost like conducting a piece of music, Calder is very related to music. He is very related to rhythm, all his obsession with jazz, the harmonies of life and life cycles, the spirals, there are lots of spirals in this work.

== Artworks ==
=== Snow Flurry, I ===
A CGI animation of the MoMA Snow Flurry

Year: 1948

Snow Flurry, I measures 238.7 cm × 208.8 cm and was gifted to the Museum of Modern Art (MoMA) by Calder in 1966. It was displayed at the Tate Modern in 2015, where curator Ann Coxon said that, based on the sculpture, "a sense of the natural world has also been important: [they were] looking at opening up some of the windows, getting a sense of the outside coming in". As of 2020, it is not displayed.

=== Snow Flurry II ===
Year: 1948

The second of the 1948 collection is owned by the Museu de Arte Contemporânea da Universidade de São Paulo. It measures 185.4 cm × 205.7 cm.

=== Snow Flurry III ===
Year: 1948

Snow Flurry III measures 134.6 cm × 228.6 cm and is owned by the Portland Museum of Art, given as an anonymous gift, where it is on the first floor of the Payson building. It was displayed on loan at the National Gallery of Victoria in 2019.

At the Portland museum, it is said to be "one of the most beloved sculptures".

=== Snow Flurry ===
Year: 1950

Measuring 152.4 cm × 213.4 cm, this piece is the best known variation.

The 1950 sculpture was owned by Eliot Noyes, a close friend of Calder's, and then his family until 2012, when it was sold at Christie's; the saleroom created a catalog for Noyes' Calder pieces that capitalized on the connection to the owner as well as the artist. It achieved US$10,386,500, a record price for a Calder work and the most expensive hanging mobile ever sold at the time. Its original estimate was US$3.5–4.5 million. The new owner is also based in the United States.

=== Snow Flurries ===
Year: 1951

The Snow Flurries mobile is 243.8 cm × 243.8 cm and is owned by the Museum of Contemporary Art, Chicago. In a review while on display at the Orange County Museum of Art, its "pure visual impact" was said to be "quite arresting". It has also been shown at the Nasher Museum of Art, where it took ten workers to hang it.

=== Ráfaga de nieve ===
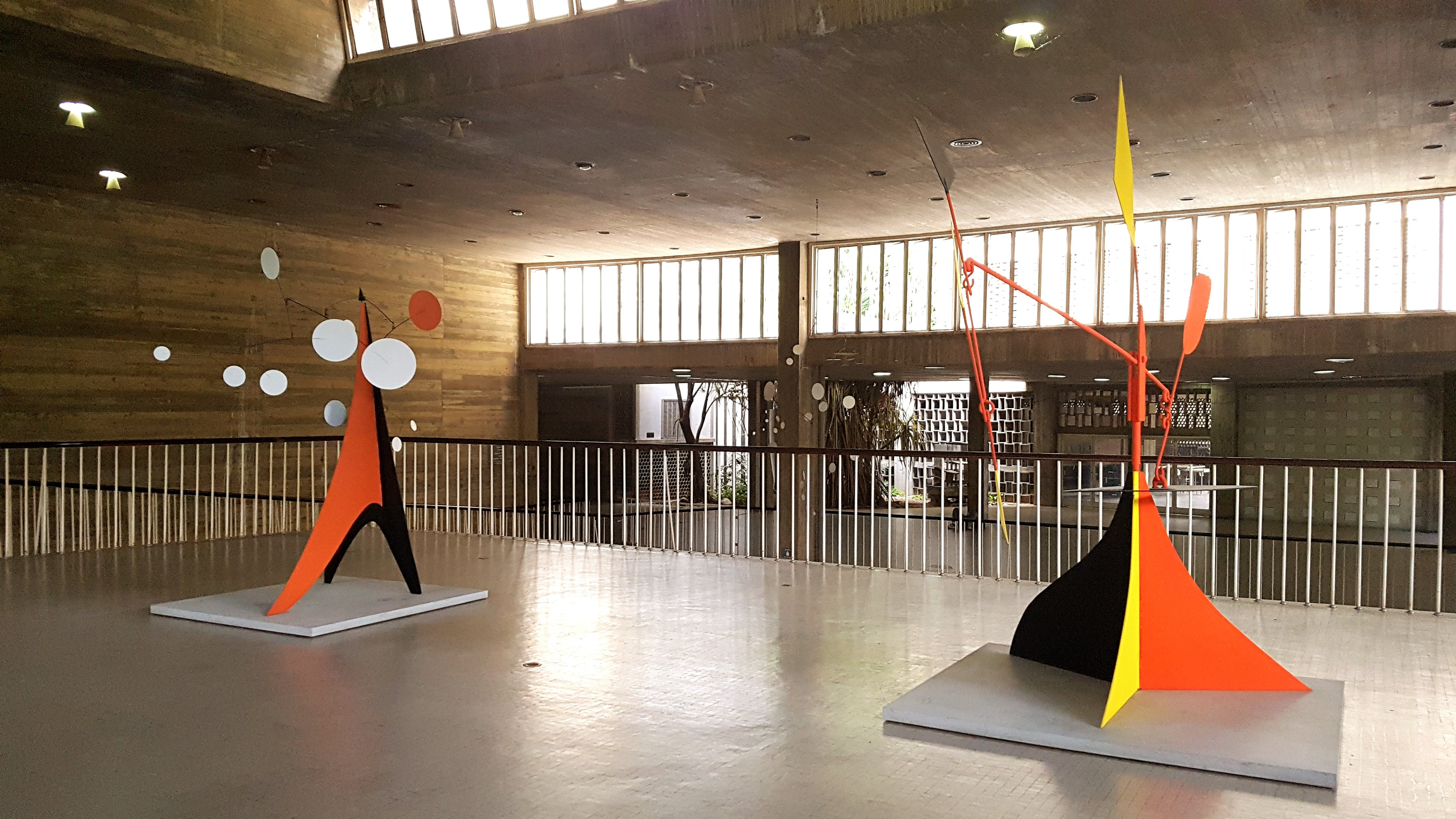
The Ráfaga de nieve overhangs a balcony in the Central University of Venezuela's Faculty of Architecture and Urbanism. Two other Calder sculptures are on the balcony.

Year: 1955

The version at the Central University of Venezuela, titled in Spanish, is 320 cm × 250 cm.

The Venezuelan architect and designer Carlos Raúl Villanueva began designing the University City of Caracas campus in the 1940s, beginning construction in the 1950s in a time of prevailing Modernism in Latin America. Villanueva hired many artists from around the world to contribute works to the campus, including Calder, who contributed four pieces; Ráfaga de nieve, a monumental acoustic sculpture called the Floating Clouds, and two stabiles. (Note: See his entry in the list of campus artworks.)

The mobile was first restored in 1983, and restored again in 2013; its location allows strong air currents to damage it over time while also making it difficult to clean. Restoration involved consultation with the Calder Foundation, and each piece was documented and labeled before it was dismantled and removed. A geometric analysis of the mobile suggested that in some formations it shows Fibonacci patterns in its layout.

=== Snow Flurry, May 14 ===
Year: 1959

This mobile is 243.84 cm × 426.72 cm, and is owned and displayed in the Denver Art Museum, having been purchased for US$500,000 in 1997. It was loaned to a display at Denver Botanic Gardens in summer 2017. It was first displayed at the Tate Gallery London in 1962, specifically lent by Calder. After display in the Tate exhibition it was lent for display to Leeds City Art Gallery who were in the process of negotiating an acquisition for the collection, through the Leeds Art Collections Fund, eventually buying the work Chicago Black. A contemporary report wrote that: "After an exhilarating correspondence we are greatly indebted to Mr. Calder for lending one of his finest mobiles called Snow Flurry—it was in the exhibition—for hanging in the vestibule at the Art Gallery. When it eventually has to be taken down and returned to America, a feeling of discontent is bound to descend also, this time on staff and visitors alike."

== See also ==
- List of Alexander Calder public works
