= Henri Laurens =

French sculptor and illustrator (1885–1954)

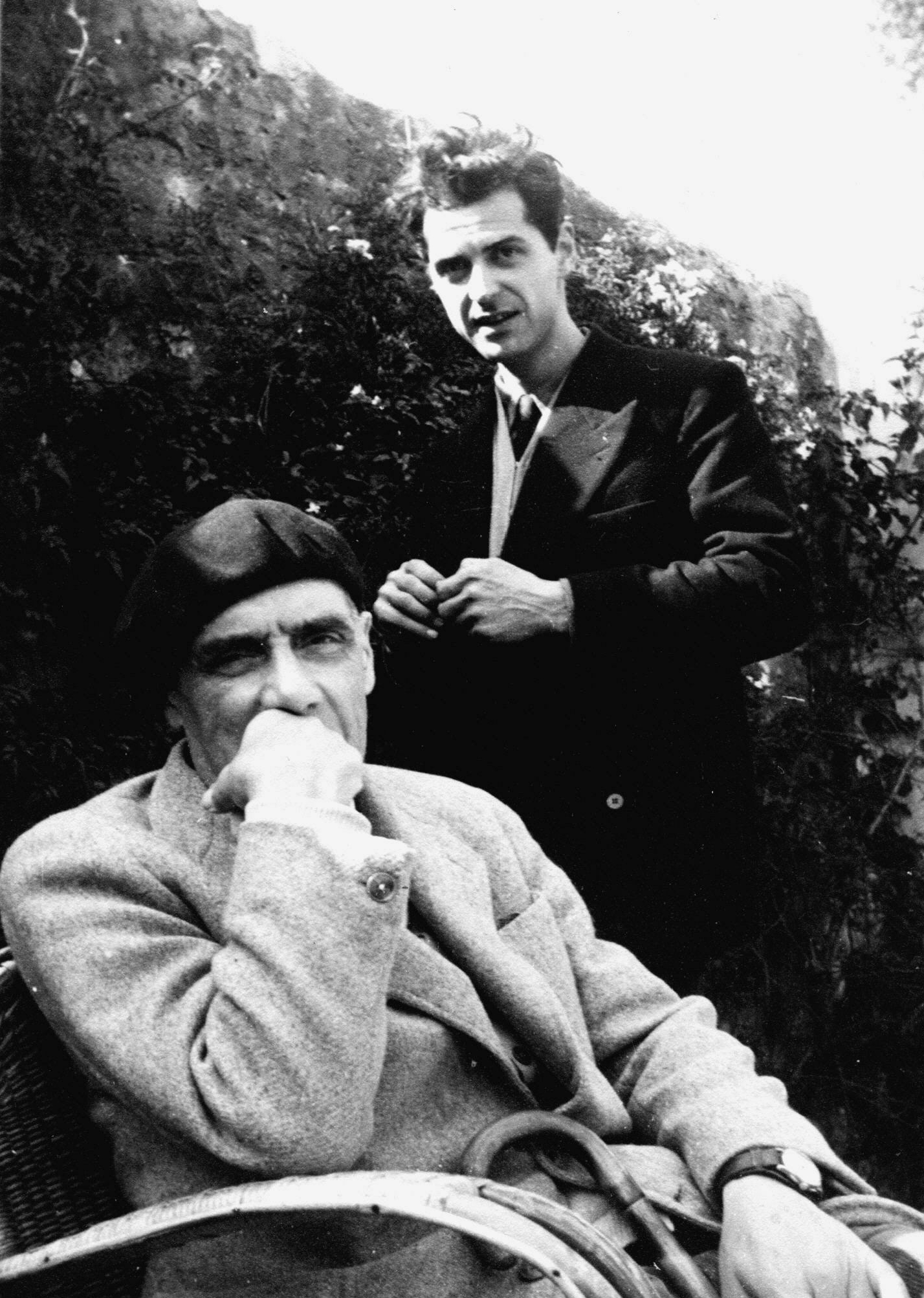
- Laurens (seated) and Jean Vincent de Crozals, c. 1950
- Born: 18 February 1885; Paris, France
- Died: 5 May 1954 (aged 69); Paris, France
- Resting place: Montparnasse Cemetery
- Occupations: Sculptor; illustrator

Henri Laurens (18 February 1885 – 5 May 1954) was a French sculptor and illustrator.

== Early life and education ==
Born in Paris, Laurens worked as a stonemason before he became a sculptor. From 1899 to 1902, he attended drawing classes at the École d'Art Industriel, during which he produced works that were greatly influenced by the popularity of Auguste Rodin.

== Career ==
Later Laurens was drawn to a new gathering of artistic creativity in Montparnasse. From 1915, he began to sculpt in the Cubist style after meeting Pablo Picasso, Georges Braque, Juan Gris and Fernand Léger.

Laurens was exempted from call-up for the First World War, after having a leg amputated in 1909 due to osteo-tuberculosis.

Multi-talented, Laurens worked with poster paint, and collage. He was an engraver, and created theatre design and decoration. In 1915, he illustrated a book for his friend, the author Pierre Reverdy.

In 1937, he was awarded the Helena Rubinstein Prize, which brought him in additional commissions. In 1938, he shared an exhibition with Braque and Picasso that travelled to major Scandinavian cities. In 1947, he made prints for book illustrations. In 1948, he exhibited his art at the important international Venice Biennale. That same year, he exhibited at the Galerie d'Art Moderne in Basel, Switzerland.

Many of his sculptures are massive objects. An example of this style is the monumental piece L'Amphion, which he first designed on a smaller scale before created the final version in 1952 for the Central University of Venezuela, Caracas, after a request from the architect Carlos Raúl Villanueva.

Laurens' sculptural work influenced the work of architect Jørn Utzon, famous for the Sydney Opera House, in particular Laurens' tomb for an aviator designed for the cemetery of Montparnasse, Paris, in 1924.

== Personal life ==
Laurens was the father of the architect Claude Laurens (1908–2003).

Laurens died in Paris, after collapsing while out on an evening walk, and was interred in the Montparnasse Cemetery there. His tomb is decorated with his sculpture, La Douleur.

== Gallery ==
Henri Laurens, 1920, Le Petit boxeur, 43 cm, reproduced in Život 2 (1922), p 53

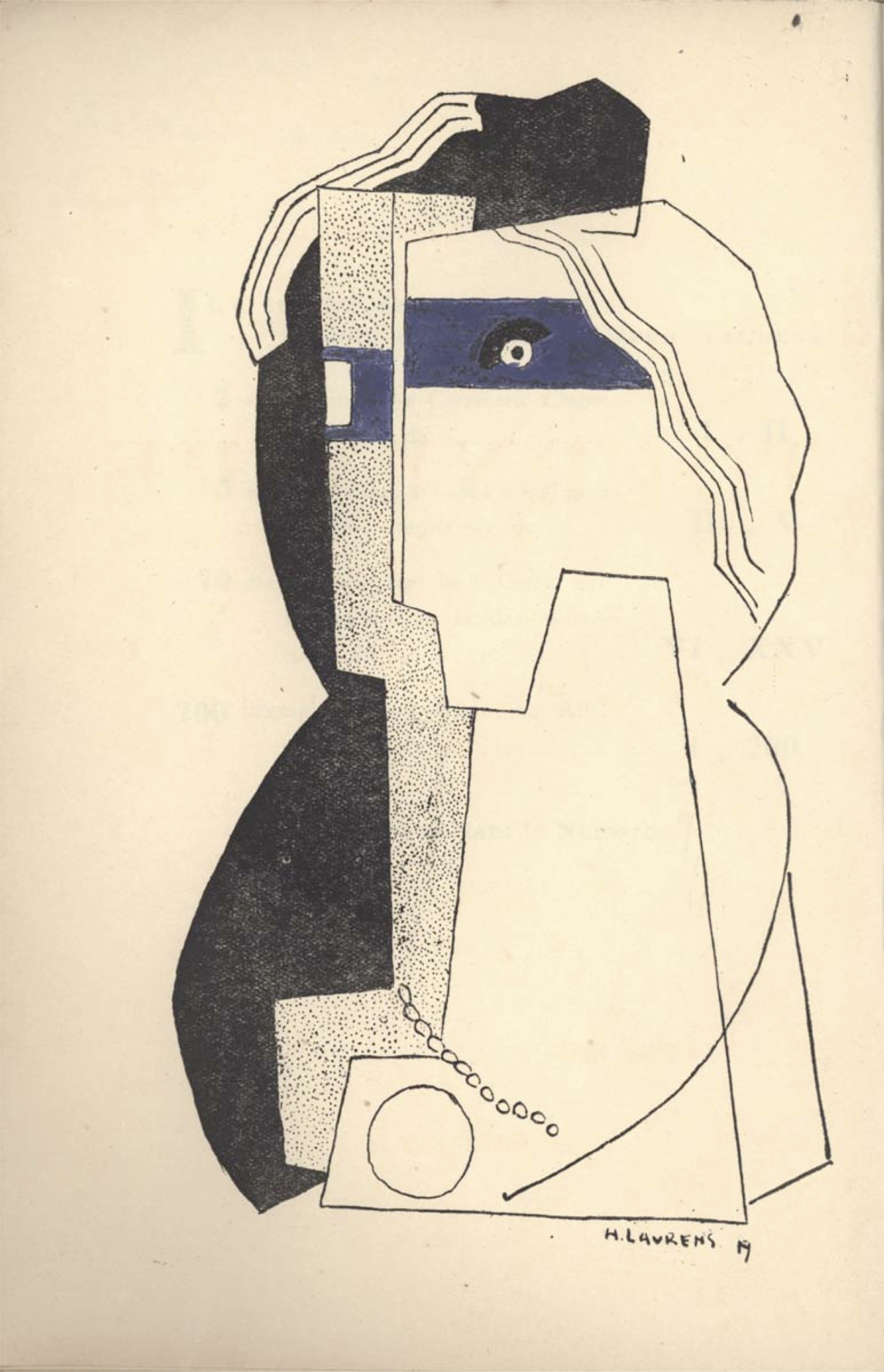
Henri Laurens, Céline Arnauld, reproduced in Tournevire, Edition de L'Esprit Nouveau, 1919

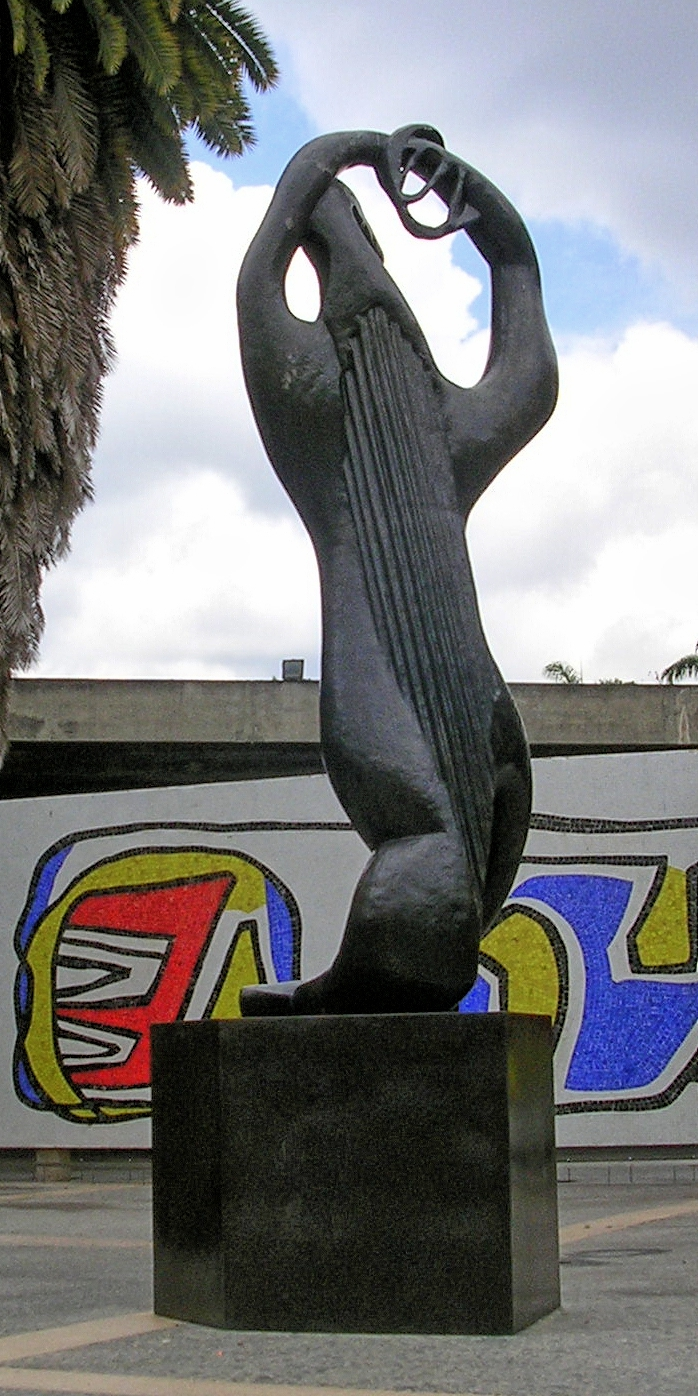
L'Amphion located at the Central University of Venezuela, Caracas

== See also ==
- Crystal Cubism
