= Covered Gymnasium (Central University of Venezuela) =

Covered Gymnasium, UCV
UNESCO World Heritage Site
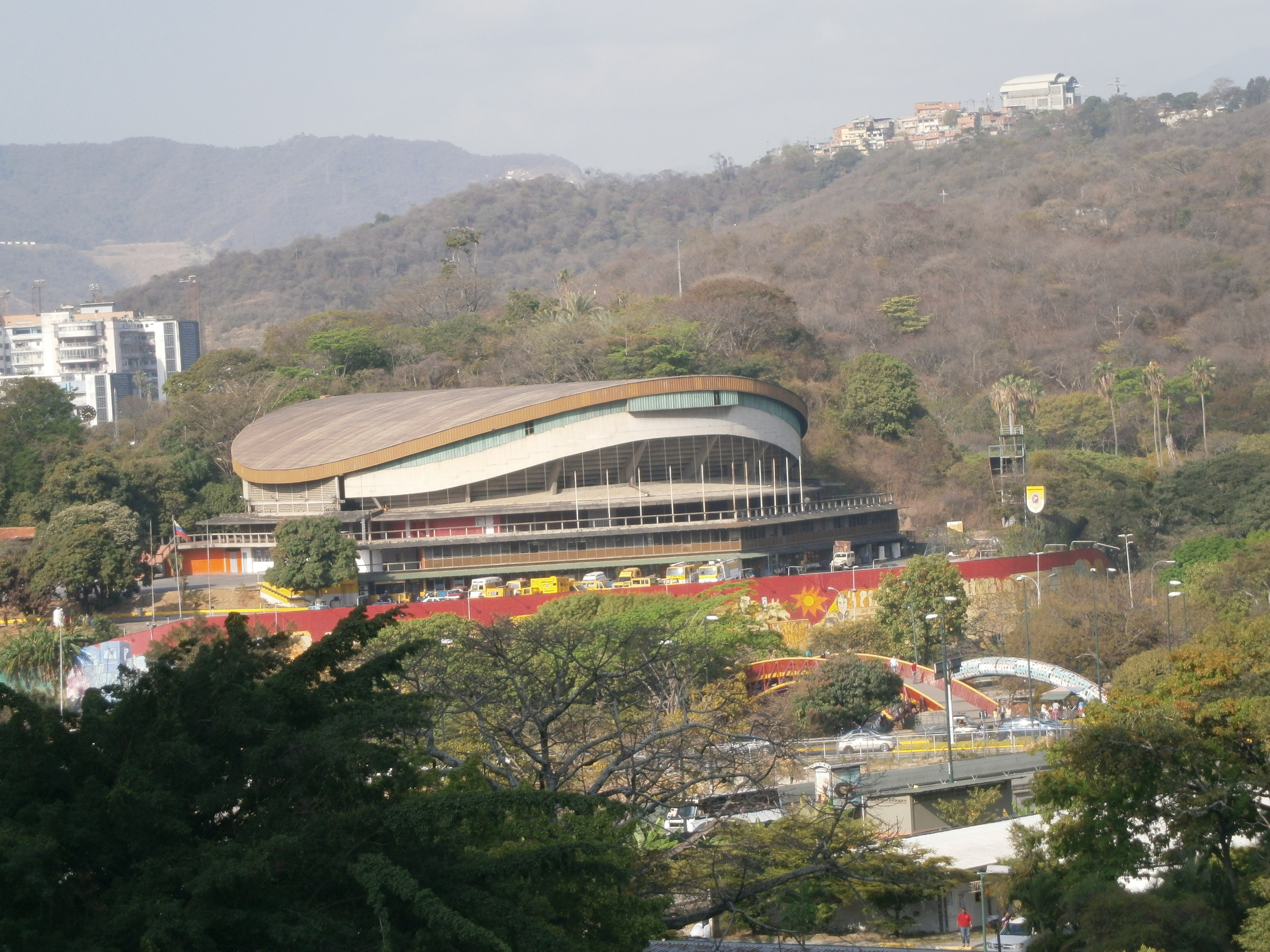

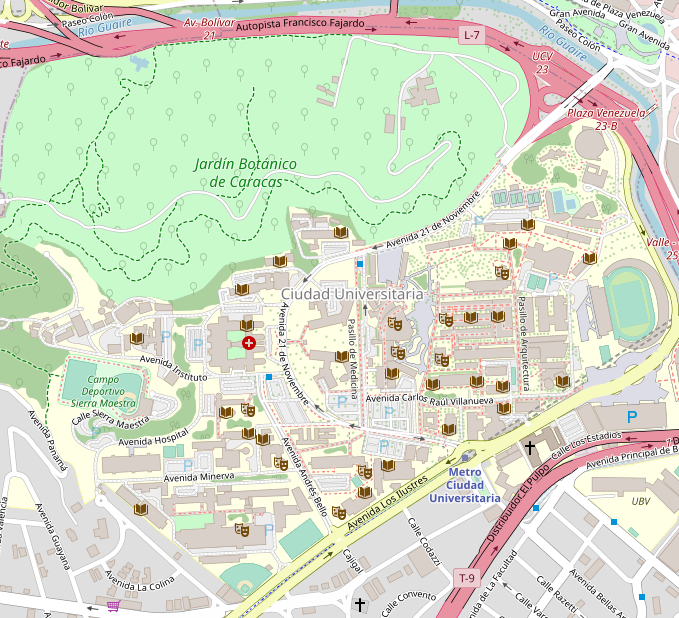
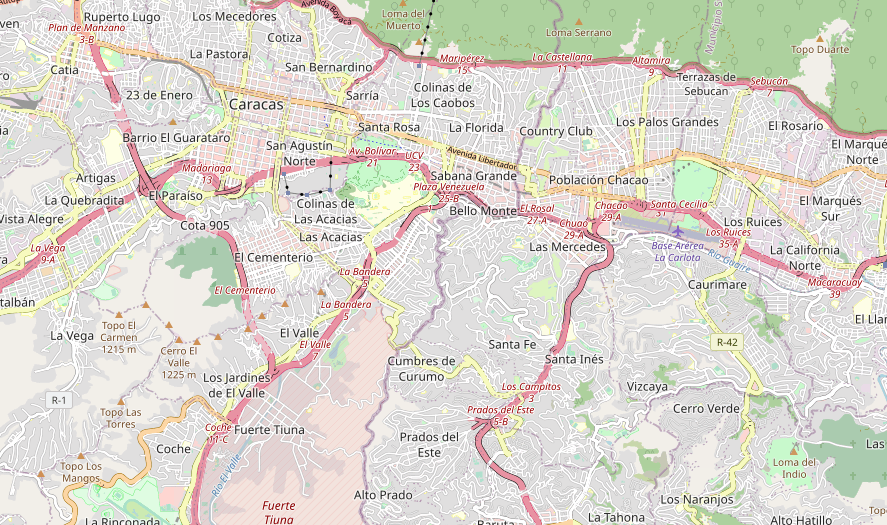
- Location within Universidad Central de Venezuela Location within Caracas Location within Venezuela
- Location: University City of Caracas, Venezuela
- Criteria: Cultural: (i), (iv)
- Reference: 986
- Inscription: 2000 (24th Session)
- Coordinates: 10°29′40″N 66°53′11″W

The Covered Gymnasium of UCV (informally known as "La Cachucha", The Hat, because of its particular shape) is a multi-purpose gym located in the University City of Caracas. Its spaces are public property that is administered by the Central University of Venezuela through the UCV sports department.

== Building ==
The space is located within the University City of Caracas, near the Francisco Fajardo Freeway and the Plaza Venezuela. Within the campus, it shares a neighborhood with the School of Hydrometerological Meteorology, the UCV Meteorological Station and the house of the Old Hacienda Ibarra. Like all spaces of the UCV, it has been a World Heritage Site since 2000.

The cement roof was never put on the gymnasium.

== History and uses ==
In the gym, various sports are practiced. These include basketball, futsal, volleyball, and karate, and are usually teams that belong to the university itself or to championships in which it participates.

During the first Rafael Caldera government, the gymnasium and the Botanical Garden were occupied and closed by disturbances internal to the university. It was remodeled for the 1983 Pan American Games.

== Conductores de Venezuela ==
A giant mural marks the boundary of the University City of Caracas campus on the side of the gymnasium. This work of art is called Conductores de Venezuela or Conductores del país and was designed by cartoonist Pedro León Zapata. The name translates to "leaders of Venezuela", with the mural depicting historic figures like Simón Bolívar, Simón Rodríguez, Teresa de la Parra, Armando Reverón, and José María Vargas driving vehicles.

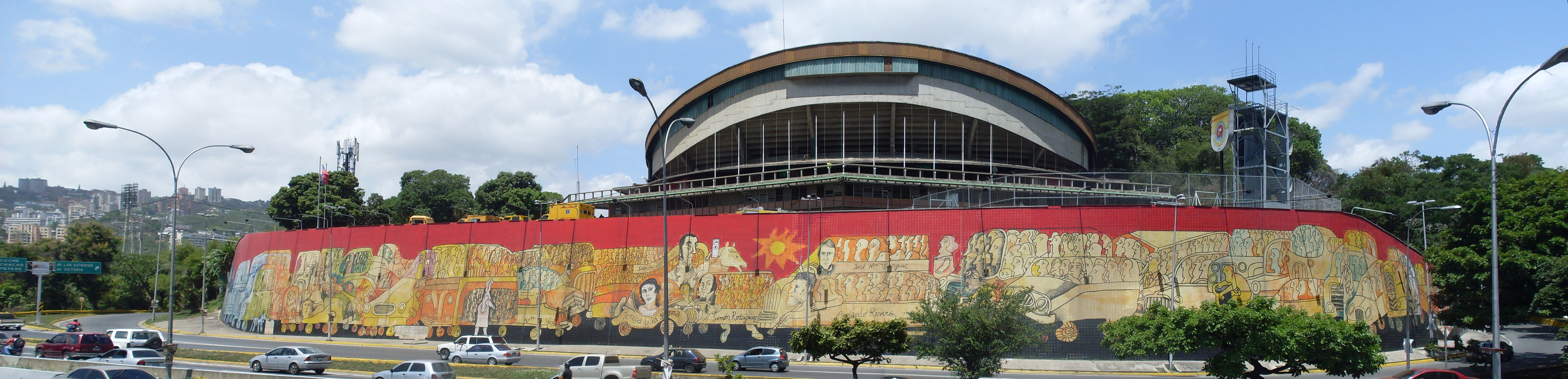
Pedro León Zapata mural Los Conductores de Venezuela, 1999, on the side of the stadium facing the highway

== See also ==
- Sport in Venezuela
