= Floating Clouds (artwork) =

Artwork by Alexander Calder

Coordinates: 10°29′27″N 66°53′26″W

- Nubes (Spanish)
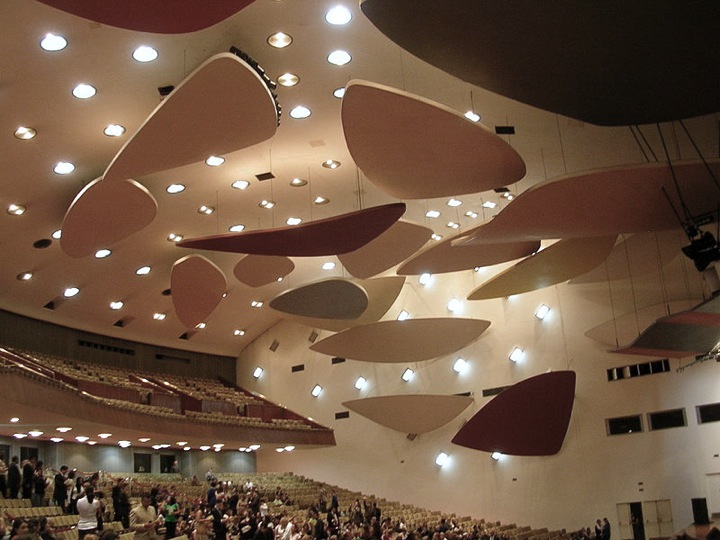
- Artist: Alexander Calder
- Year: 1953
- Location: Caracas
- Owner: Central University of Venezuela

Floating Clouds (sometimes called Flying Saucers by the artist) is a work of art by American sculptor Alexander Calder, located in the Aula Magna of the University City of Caracas in Venezuela. The 1953 work comprises many 'cloud' panels that are renowned both artistically and acoustically. The piece is seen as "one of Calder's most truly monumental works" and the prime example of the urban-artistic theory of campus architect Carlos Raúl Villanueva.

Originally intended as only an art piece, the panels were moved inside the Aula Magna to resolve the poor acoustics caused by the hall's design; the hall has since been said to have some of the best acoustics in the world. The Floating Clouds are named specifically in the UNESCO listing of the campus as a World Heritage Site, and are greatly renowned in Venezuela.

== Background ==
The Venezuelan architect and designer Carlos Raúl Villanueva began designing the University City of Caracas campus in the 1940s, beginning construction in the 1950s. In a time of prevailing Modernism in Latin America, Villanueva had a stylistic ideology for the project he called the "Synthesis of the Arts"; combining the arts and architecture and creating artistic pieces that could also serve functional purposes. These principles also facilitated for the campus designs to change dramatically, both through necessity and the whim of the designer and artists he hired.

Villanueva hired many artists from around the world to contribute works to the campus, including the American sculptor Alexander Calder. Calder contributed four pieces; the Floating Clouds, two stabiles, and a mobile known as Ráfaga de nieve. (Note: See his entry in the list of campus artworks.)

== Design and construction ==
The design of the Floating Clouds was originally a large mobile structure for outside the Aula Magna, either in its atrium or in the Plaza Cubierta, a connected covered outdoor space, but the artwork was moved inside for two diverse reasons. During the design of the hall, Calder learnt how complex both Villanueva's project and his Synthesis of the Arts theory were, and proposed an integration of his panels into the space to serve "an artistic, decorative and acoustic purpose". On the construction side, at the same time, the Bolt, Beranek and Newman company (who were involved for logistics and construction) made Villanueva aware of a specialist flaw in his designs for the Aula Magna; based on a conch shape, the natural acoustics would be poor and extensive panelling inside was needed. Calder's panel design would serve the acoustic function, and was modified for the interior by Robert Newman.

The panels of the design, known as 'clouds', are made of two laminated wood pieces each 13 mm (1/2 in) thick, held in a steel frame; they vary in thickness from 100 to 200 mm (4 to 8 in) and are held to the ceiling and walls by 9 1/2 mm (3/8 in) metal cables, which were adjustable at the time of installation to give the inclination and height needed. A false ceiling was created to help with the installation of the clouds and additional lighting around them. The Bolt, Beranek and Newman company installed the clouds; to calibrate the design perfectly, an orchestra played on stage while they were being fitted. The artwork comprises 31 clouds, with 22 on the ceiling, five on the right side wall and four on the left side wall. The largest of these has a surface area of 80 m^{2} (860 sq ft) and a weight of approximately 2.3 tonnes (2.5 short tons). Ladders exist in the ceiling space, allowing people to climb through the clouds.

== Appearance and function ==
The design of the clouds and their response to a problem with sound was a contributor to the development of interior space acoustics. The panels are positioned with consideration to angle and dimensions; some absorb sound, some project it, and some magnify it. As Calder intended, the clouds combine technology and art; however, Calder had also wanted the clouds to be movable, so that they could create different acoustic experiences, but they are not – after being angled for installation they are fixed. The hall can have two different acoustic optimization formats, though, as a removable fiberglass sheet was installed above the panels. This is intended to reduce echo and sound transfer time, which optimizes the acoustics for speech; removing the sheet with the clouds in place gives the outstanding acoustics for musical performance.

Art critic Phyllis Tuchman notes that though Calder was not Latin American, the "colorfully curving" clouds are "archetypically 'Latin American'"; she says that this "express[es] the region's 'lyricism'". Tuchman also appreciates the real cloud-like appearance, saying that the interior of the hall "resembles clouds scattered across a night sky [...] [w]ith the hall darkened", so those who enter with only the houselights on "feel as if they have entered a multihued, three-dimensional abstract painting". Patrick Frank, writer on modern art in Latin America, says that the design "both dazzles the senses and inspires awareness".

Supposedly, when the Aula Magna was completed and the clouds had just been painted, Villanueva went inside to see them and was so impressed he threw his arms up and cheered.

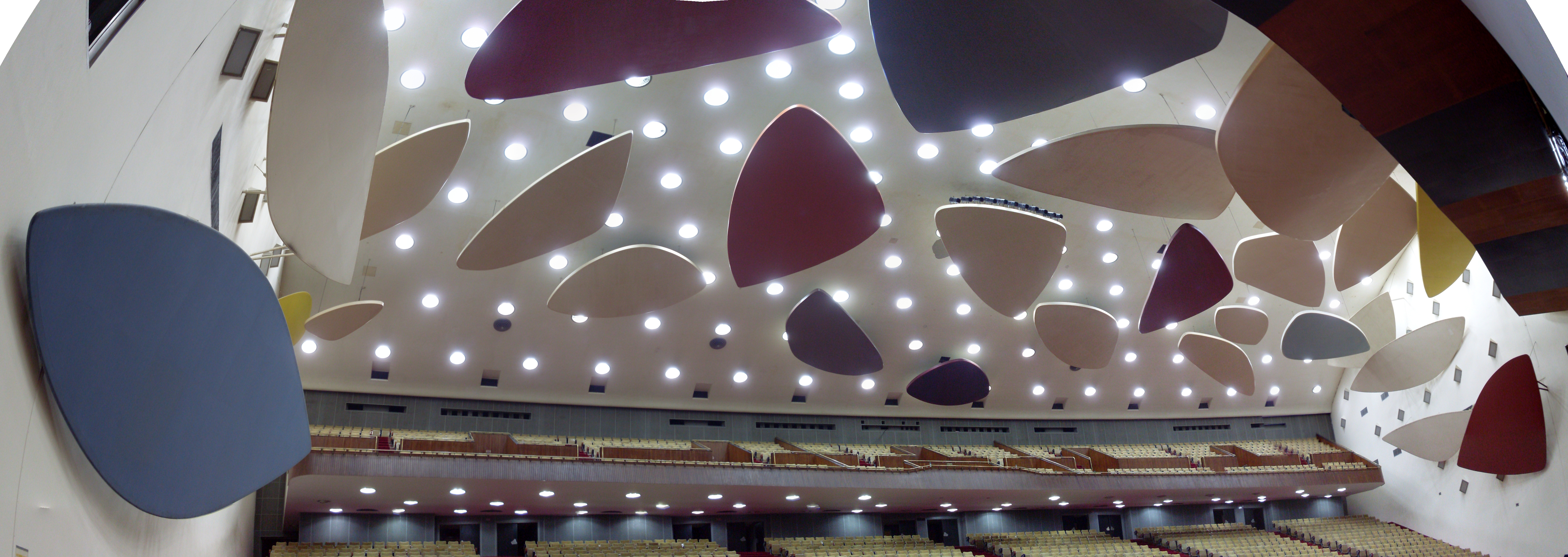
A panorama of the Floating Clouds

== Legacy ==
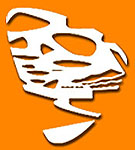
Villanueva centenary logo

After working on the campus project, Villanueva and Calder began a longstanding working relationship. However, Calder only saw his Floating Clouds in person once, when visiting Villanueva in Caracas in 1955. The clouds are seen as the best example of Villanueva's philosophy of the campus project, in that they combine art, architecture, design, and function. Calder is noted as naming the clouds as his favorite of his own works, while acknowledging they are less remembered than many other pieces.

The Aula Magna was ranked by acoustics engineer Leo Beranek in the 1980s as one of the top five concert halls worldwide in terms of acoustics, largely because of the clouds. The interior design and function has also influenced other venues seeking impressive acoustics, including an opera hall in China.

In UNESCO's World Heritage listing of the campus, the Clouds are named specifically.

A stylized image of the interior of the Aula Magna, framed as a silhouette within a shape of one of the clouds, is used as the logo for the centenary celebration of Villanueva.

== See also ==
- Aula Magna (Central University of Venezuela)#Nubes de Calder
- List of artworks in University City of Caracas
- List of Alexander Calder public works § Venezuela
