= Hospital Clínico Universitario =

Hospital Universitario de Caracas
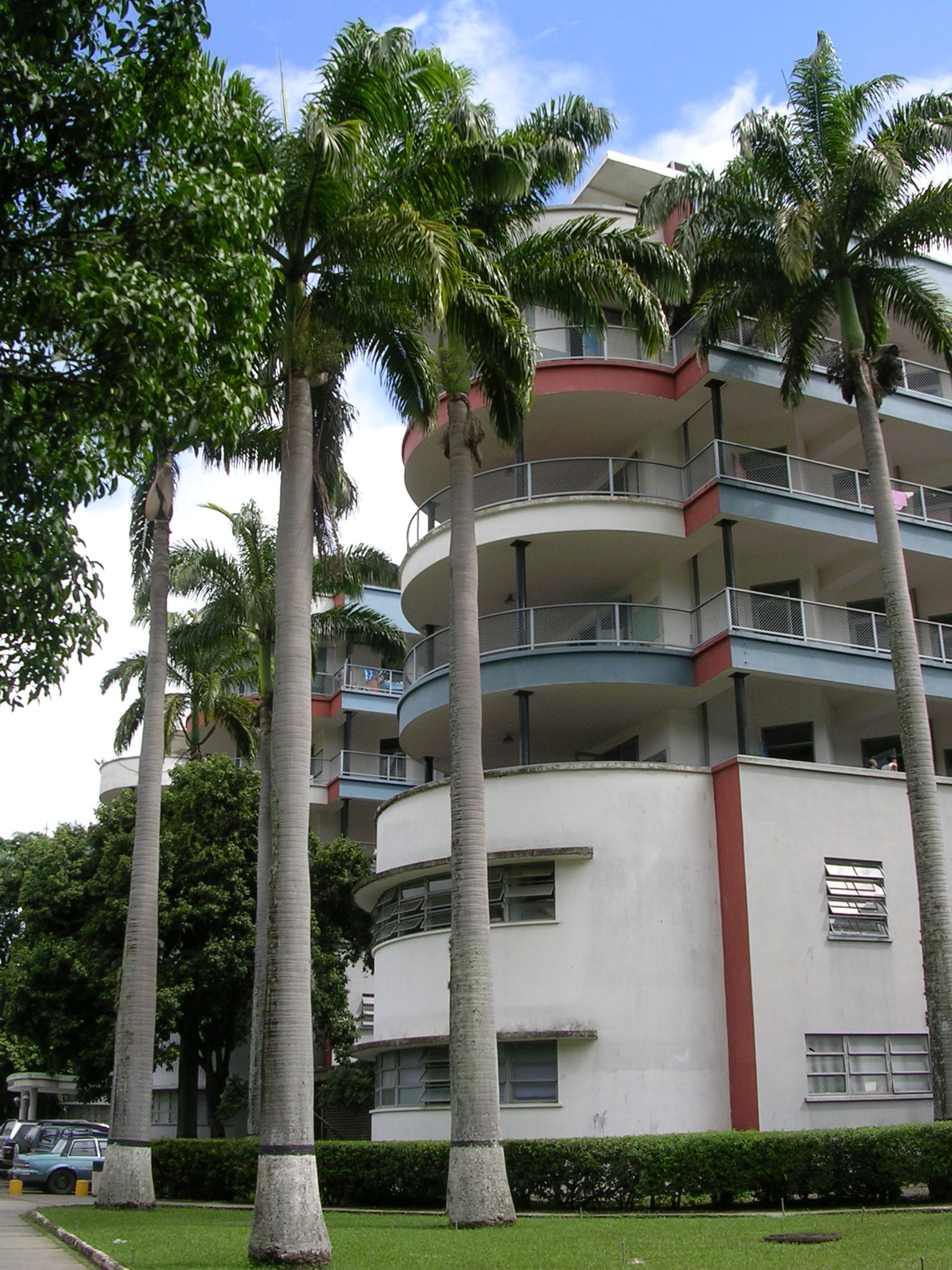

Geography
- Location: Caracas, Venezuela
- Coordinates: 10°29′25″N 66°53′38″W

Organisation
- Care system: Public
- Type: Teaching
- Affiliated university: Central University of Venezuela

Services
- Emergency department: Yes
- Speciality: 7 departments

History
- Opened: 1954

Links
- Website: http://huc.gov.ve/index.html
- Lists: Hospitals in Venezuela

The Hospital Universitario de Caracas or University Hospital of Caracas (also named Hospital Clínico Universitario or just El Clínico) is a publicly owned hospital located in the spaces of the Ciudad Universitaria de Caracas, part of the Central University of Venezuela, located in the Chaguaramos parish of Libertador Municipality in the District Capital of Venezuela and west of Caracas Metropolitan District and the city of Caracas, the north central Venezuela.

The idea of creating this institution arose in the year 1943 on the initiative of General Eleazar López Contreras who in the same year ordered start work with the design of the architect Carlos Raúl Villanueva. It was completed in 1954 and opened in the year 1956 under the dictatorship of General Marcos Perez Jimenez .

As part of the Central University of Venezuela its structure is World Heritage Site since 2000. It is accessible through the line 3 station of the Caracas Metro Ciudad Universitaria.

== See also ==
- List of hospitals in Venezuela
