= Berger des Nuages =

Coordinates: 10°29′27.4″N 66°53′28″W

- Pastor de Nubes (Spanish), Cloud Shepherd (English)
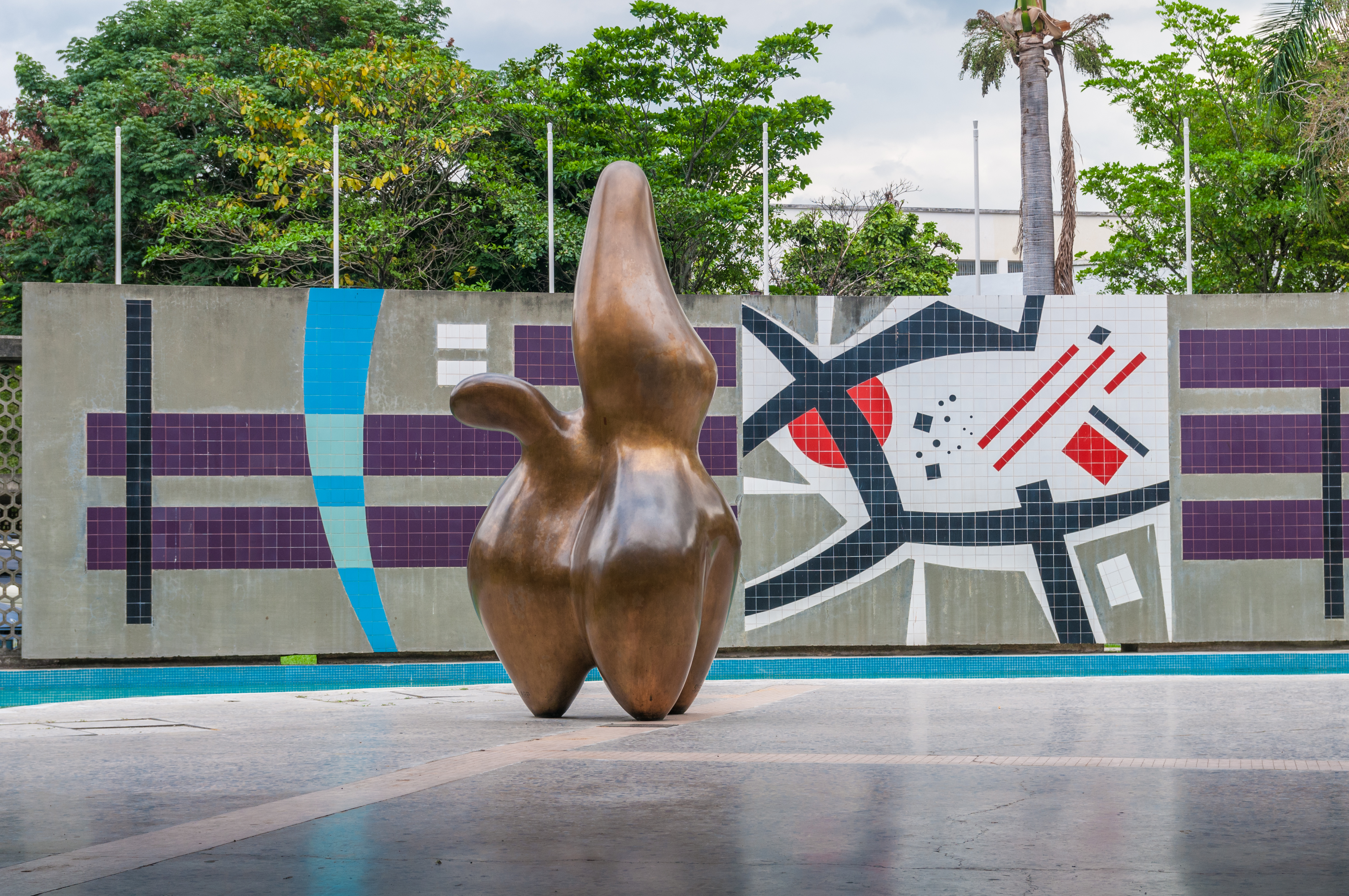
- Berger des Nuages, with Mateo Manaure's bimural behind
- Artist: Jean Arp
- Year: 1954
- Type: Bronze
- Dimensions: 3.2 m (130 in)
- Owner: Central University of Venezuela

Berger des Nuages, Pastor de Nubes, or Cloud Shepherd is a work of art by Jean Arp just outside the Plaza Cubierta of the University City of Caracas.

== Background ==
The Venezuelan architect and designer Carlos Raúl Villanueva began designing the University City of Caracas campus in the 1940s, beginning construction in the 1950s during a time of prevailing Modernism in Latin America.

Villanueva hired many artists from around the world to contribute works to the campus, including Arp. (Note: See his entry in the list of campus artworks.)

== Design and construction ==
The design is also known as Forme de Lutin (Gnome Shape), and the 3.2-metre sculpture has multiple smaller copies around the world. The sculpture in Caracas was based on one of the smaller forms, which were created in 1949, and was both cast in the Susse foundry and placed on the campus in 1954.

On developing the sculpture from its smaller design, Arp said in 1953:

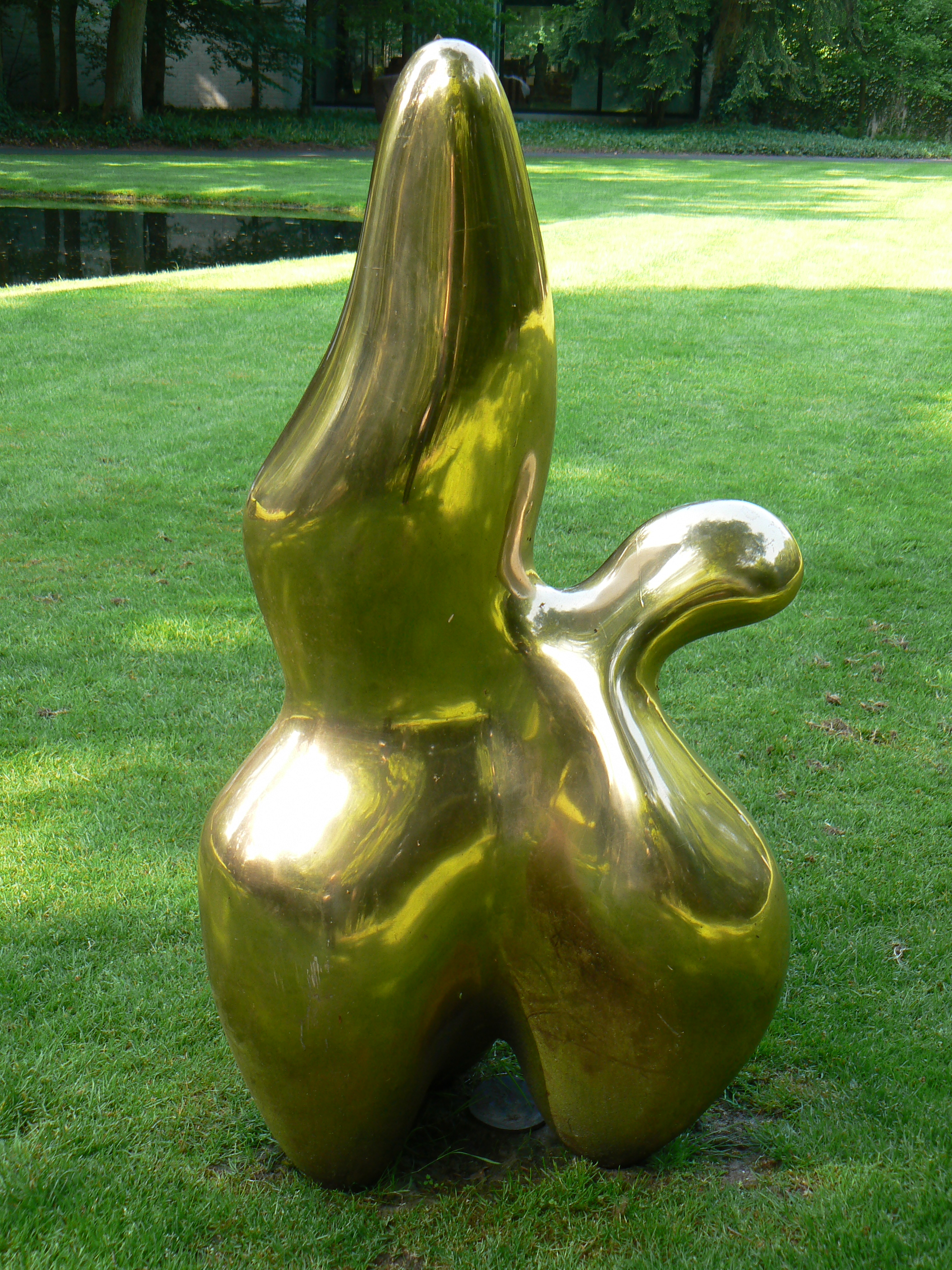
One of the smaller sculptures in the Netherlands

Au réveil, j'ai trouvé sur ma selle de sculpteur une petite forme espiègle, éveillée et d'une certaine obésité, telle le ventre d'un luth. Il me semblait qu'elle évoquait un lutin. Je l'ai donc nommée ainsi. Et voici qu'un jour, ce petit personnage de lutin, par un médium vénézuélien, se trouve tout à coup père d'un géant. Ce fils géant ressemble à son père comme un œuf à un autre, une figue à une autre, une cloche à une autre. Comme le père, il est difficile à définir. Et comme toutes les définitions, celle donnée le lundi était différente de celle du mardi. Toute définition de la matière, de l’atome, depuis les présocratiques jusqu'à nos jours ... quel nuage troublant! Était-ce ceci qui décidait le jeune géant à devenir berger de nuages?

When I woke up, I found on my sculptor's bench a small, playful, lively form of a certain obesity, like the belly of a lute. It seemed to me that it evoked a leprechaun (lutin). So I named it that way. And now one day, this little elf character, through a Venezuelan medium, suddenly finds himself the father of a giant. This giant son looks like his father like an egg to another, a fig to another, a bell to another. Like the father, it is difficult to define. And like all definitions, the one given on Monday was different from the one on Tuesday. Any definition of matter, of the atom, from the pre-Socratic to the present day ... what a disturbing cloud! Was this what made the young giant decide to become a cloud shepherd?

It is said that Arp's creative influence for the sculpture was based on his reaction to the Second World War. The sculpture's wavy form simulates the natural curves of clouds, hills, and lakes, and expresses Arp's opposition to machines that caused wars. It has elements of Surrealism and Dada.

The sculpture sits just outside the Plaza Cubierta by the Aula Magna; behind it is a large ceramic mural by Mateo Manaure.

== Appearance ==
The sculpture is described as a "large organic form with rounded, wavy protrusions [that are] more reminiscent of a strange, budding fruit". It has undergone preservation in the past, when Arp was alive to advise on how he should like it done. It was originally proposed that Arp gave the sculpture(s) its name after placement, as the shiny surface reflected the clouds passing above, but conservation efforts of Arp's works have shown that he does not like his sculptures to be reflective as this distracts from the lines in them.

== See also ==
- List of artworks in University City of Caracas
