= Pedro León Zapata =

Venezuelan artist, humorist and cartoonist

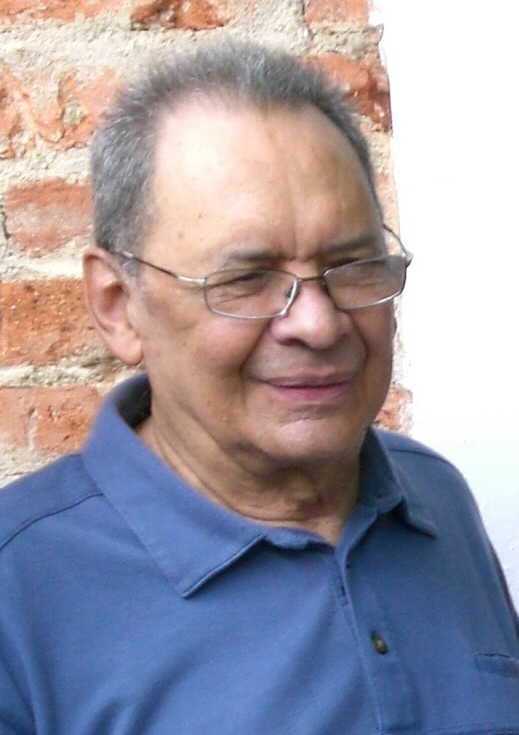
- Zapata during the event "Dibujo Libre", 5 May 2008
- Born: 27 February 1929 La Grita, Táchira, Venezuela
- Died: 6 February 2015 (aged 85) Distrito Capital, Caracas, Venezuela
- Areas: Artist, cartoonist
- Awards: "Premio Nacional de Artes Plásticas" (1980), "Premio Nacional de Periodismo" (1967)

Pedro León Zapata (27 February 1929 – 6 February 2015) was a prominent Venezuelan artist, humorist and cartoonist.

== Biography ==
In 1945 he entered the "Escuela de Artes Plásticas de Caracas" but in 1947 he abandoned the school to join the foundation of the "Taller La Barraca de Maripérez" where he exhibited his first works. In the same year, he traveled to Mexico to learn the techniques of the great muralist Diego Rivera and José Clemente Orozco and studied at the Instituto Politécnico Nacional, at La Escuela Nacional de Bellas Artes La Esmeralda and the workshop of Siqueiros.

After eleven years he returned to Venezuela and became Professor of Drawing at the Architecture School of the Central University of Venezuela and at the "Escuela de Artes Plásticas Cristóbal Rojas." In 1959 he began to draw caricatures for newspapers, first for the newspapers Dominguito and later, in 1965, he created a column in the newspaper El Nacional entitled "Zapatazos" which continues to be one of the most important places for critical commentary of the social and political situation in Venezuela. In 1968, the first collection of his caricatures was compiled under the title Las Elecciones de Zapata.

His paintings have been exhibited in many solo expositions, among them "Todo el museo para Zapata" at the Sofía Ímber Museum of Contemporary Art in 1975. He won the "Premio Nacional de Artes Plásticas" in 1980 and the "Premio Nacional de Periodismo" in 1967.

In 1992 he was in charge of designing the image of the Latin American Film Festivals at Biarritz, France and Trieste in Italy and in 1999 he finished an enormous mural of 1,500m² entitled "Conductores de Venezuela" that adorns the northern edge of the Central University of Venezuela, next to the Francisco Fajardo Highway, and represents historical Venezuelan leaders driving all kinds of vehicles.

One of Zapata's daily cartoons in the newspaper El Nacional became the subject of heavy criticism in Aló Presidente, the weekly TV program of Venezuelan President Hugo Chávez, in the year 2000 because of Zapata's view on the transformation of Venezuelan civil society into a military society caused by some of the policies implemented by Chávez at the time, like appointing in government offices numerous ex-military officers and an education plan incorporating military training in all high schools of the country. Chávez demanded an explanation for the meaning of the cartoon and suggested that Zapata had been paid to draw it. Zapata responded by drawing another cartoon which asked Chávez, "Hugo Rafael, how much were you paid to promote the cartoon?" since the newspaper sales and the profile of Zapata increased because of the controversy.

In February 2005, he received an honorary PhD from the Central University of Venezuela. The ceremony was hosted by Laureano Márquez, Claudio Nazoa, Graterolacho, Oscar Yanes, Cayito Aponte, Rubén Monasterios and Otrova Gomas.

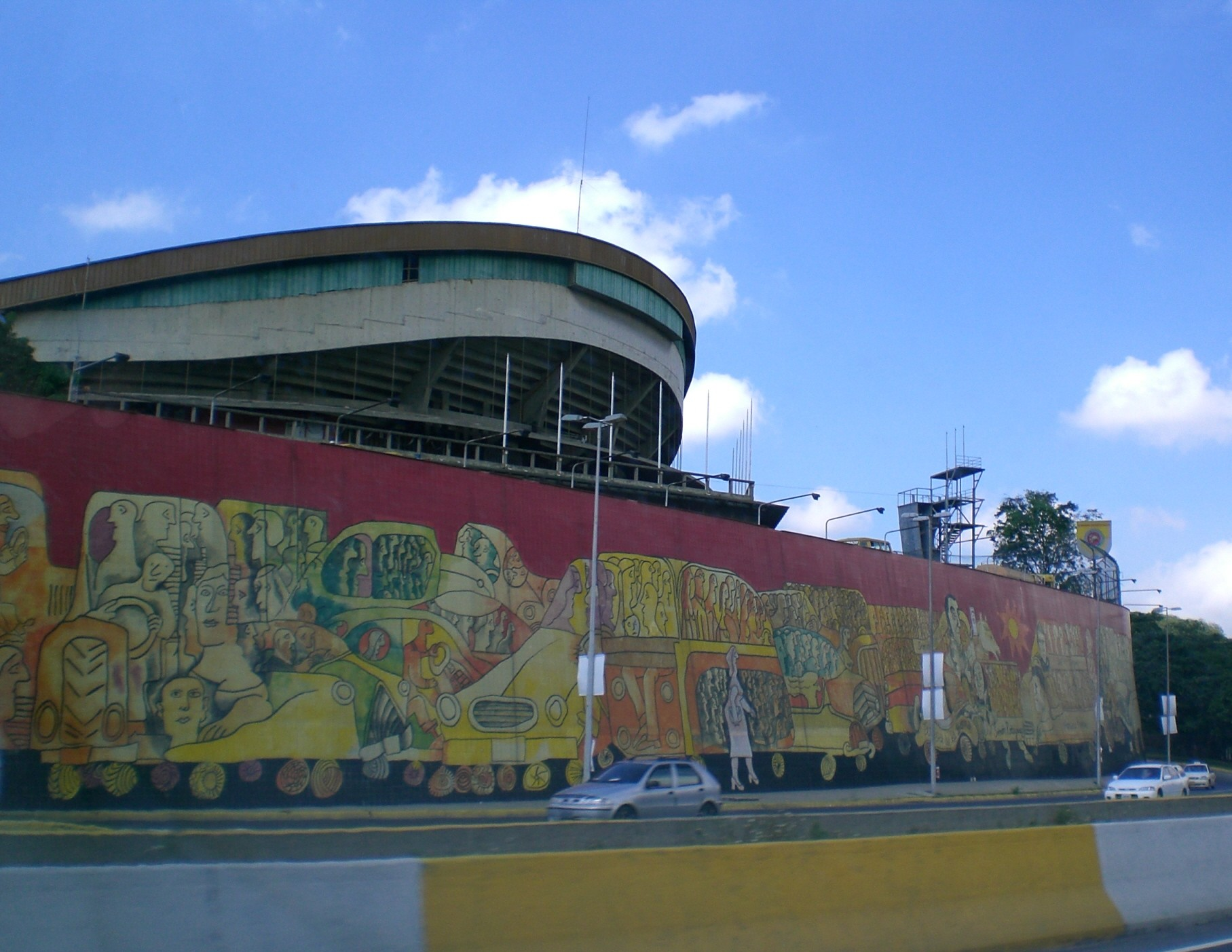
Mural "Drivers of Venezuela" in Caracas

== Works ==
- "Zapata contra Pinochet" (Caracas: Ediciones Barricada 1980)
- "Caracas: Monte y Culebra" (Caracas : Pomaire 1987) ISBN 980-290-021-4
- (with Salvador Garmendia) "Crónicas Sádicas" (Caracas : Pomaire1990) ISBN 980-290-046-X
- "Dressed and undressed : painted drawings by Pedro León Zapata" (Washington, D.C. : Art Museum of the Americas, Organization of American States 1997) ISBN 980-272-189-1
- "¡Zapata...Firme!: un país en blanco y negro" (Caracas: Ediciones EG 2001) ISBN 980-6386-24-8

== See also ==
- National Prize of Plastic Arts of Venezuela
