= Baltasar Lobo =

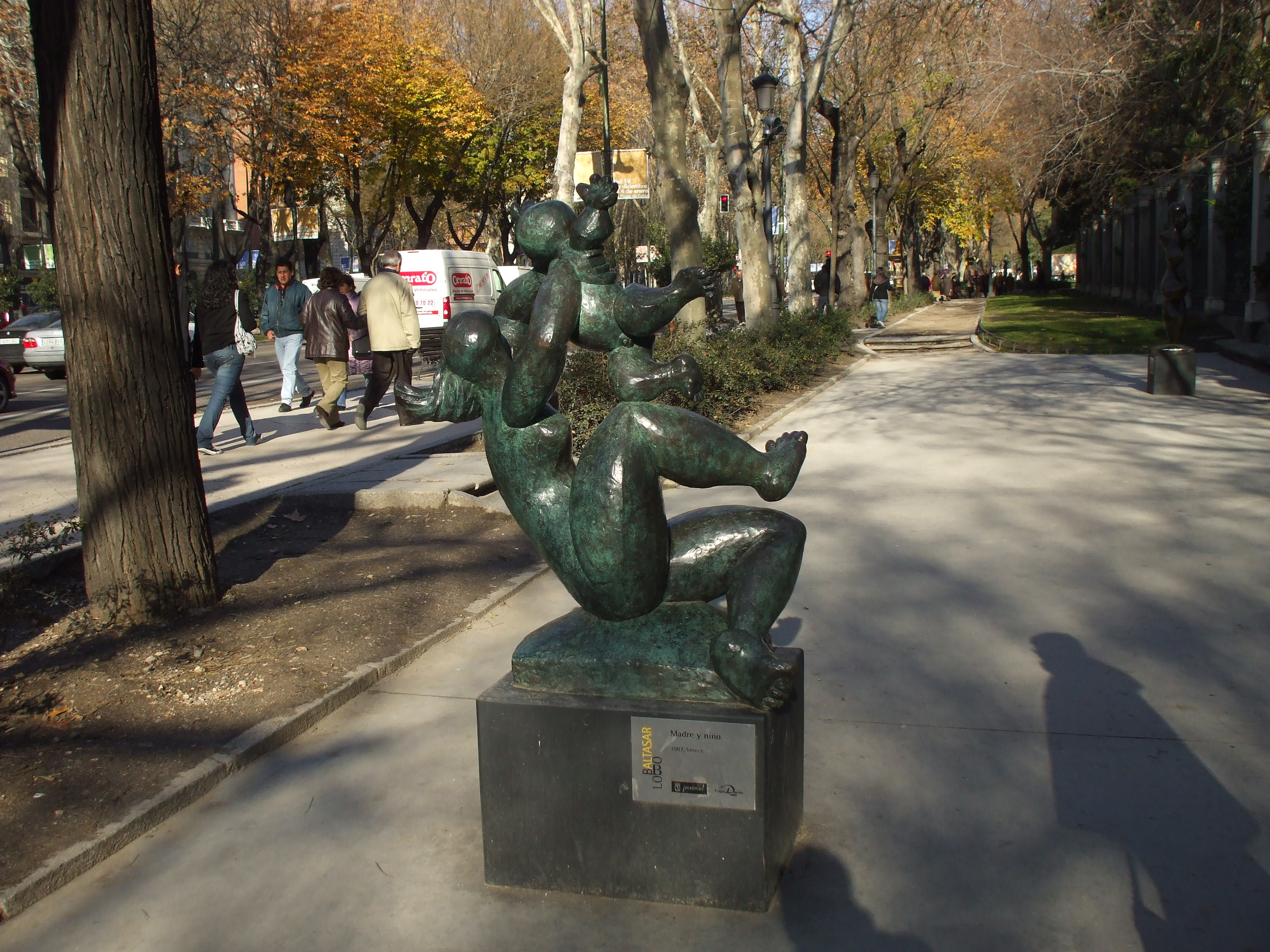
Baltasar Lobo's mother and child in Open air exhibition in Madrid, December 2008

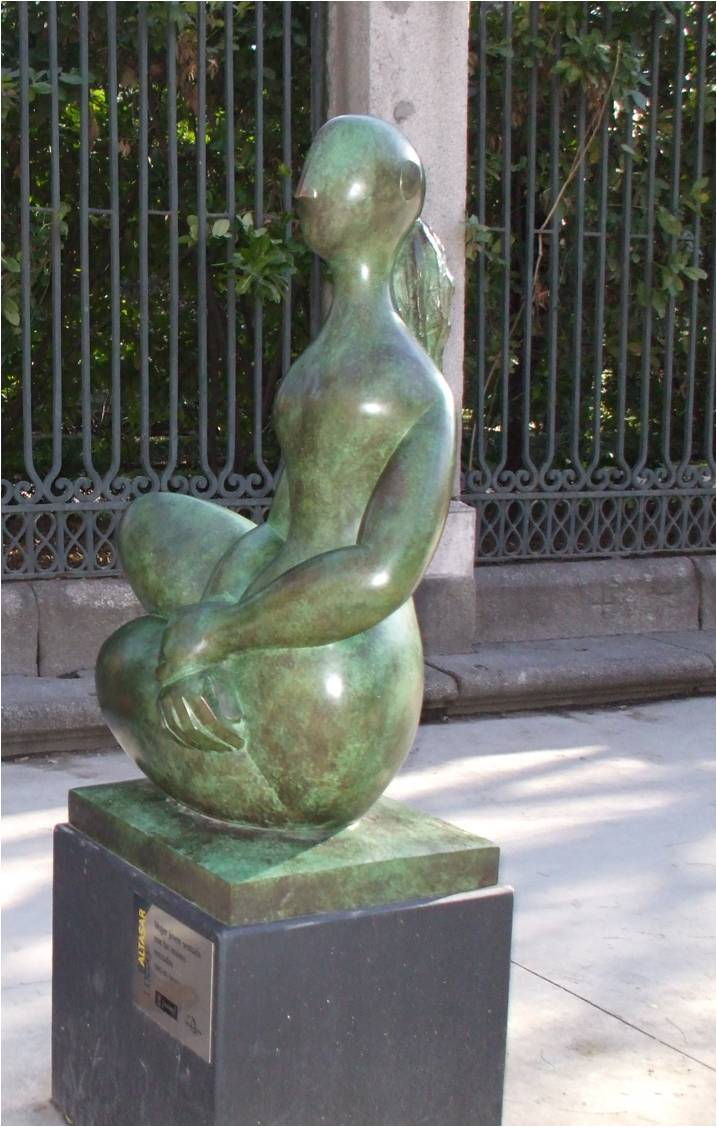
Baltasar Lobo's woman, in open air exhibition in Madrid, December 2008

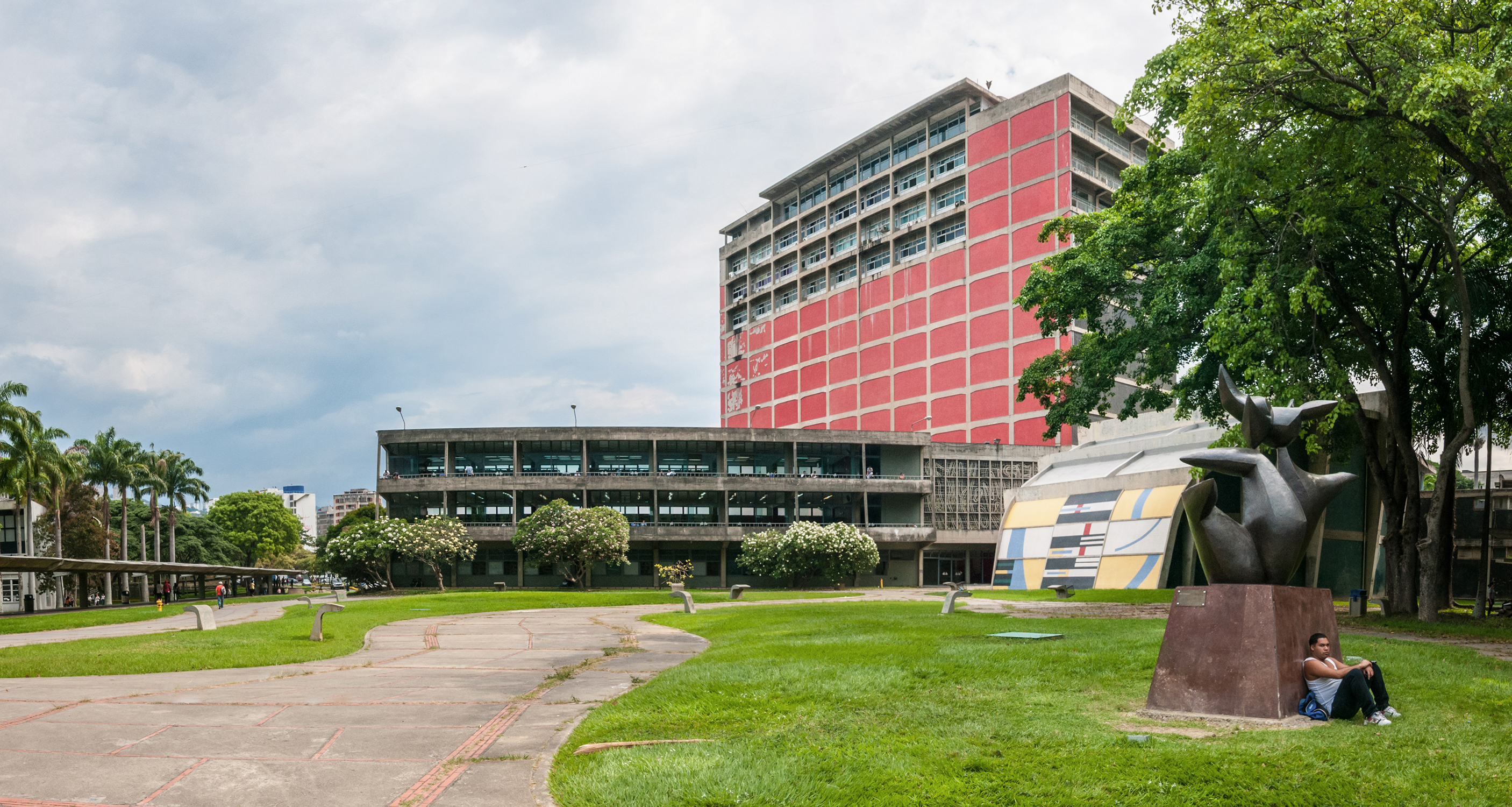
Maternidad, City University of Caracas

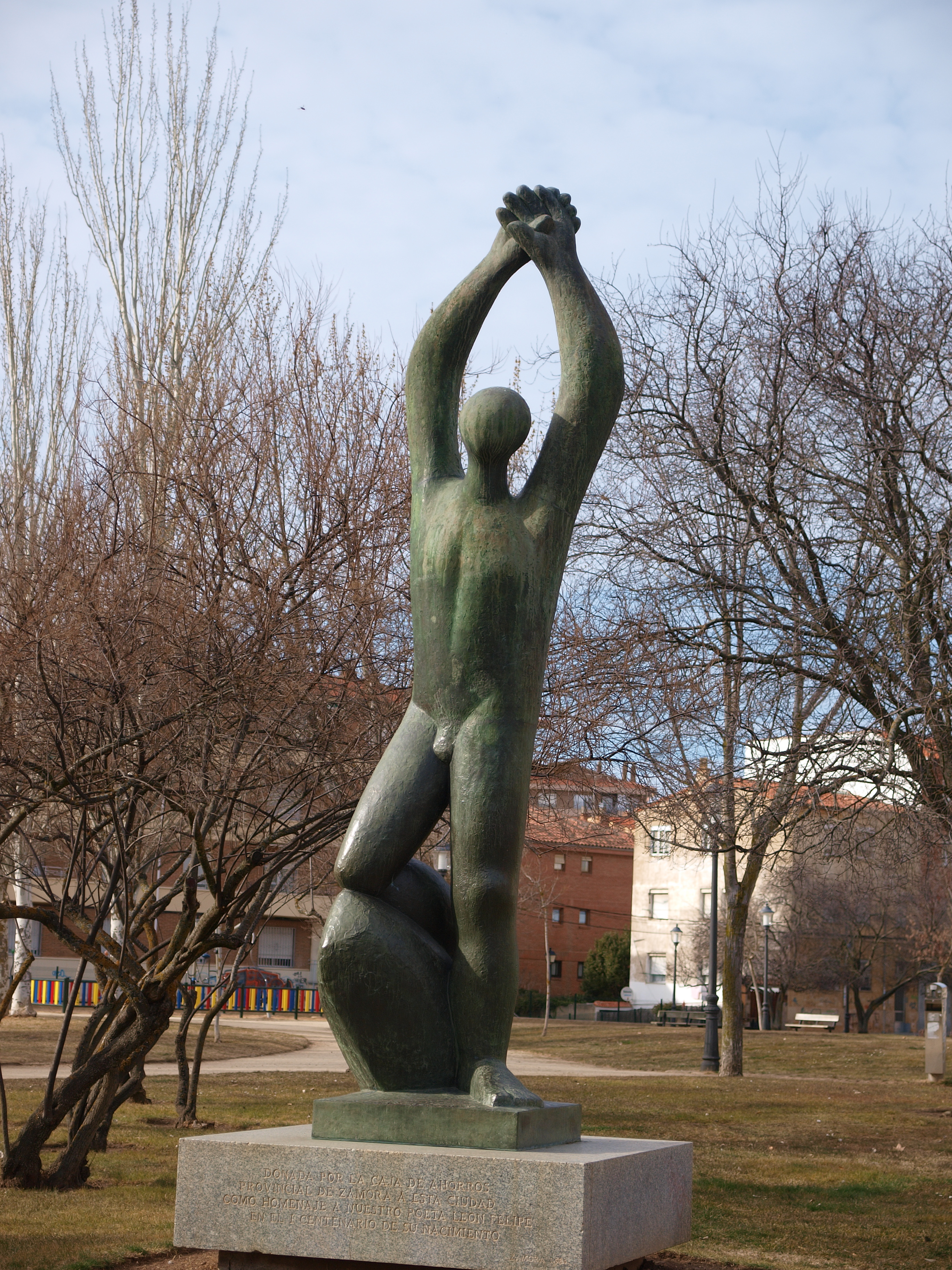
Tribute to poet Leon Felipe (Zamora, Spain)

Baltasar Lobo (22 February 1910 – 4 September 1993) was a Spanish artist, anarchist and sculptor best known for his compositions depicting mother and child.

== Life ==
Born in Cerecinos de Campos, Zamora, Spain, he moved to Paris, France in 1939 where his sculpting would be influenced by Constantin Brâncuși and Jean Arp. Lobo's art was exhibited at the Galerie Vendôme on the Rue de la Paix along with notables such as Henri Matisse, Fernand Léger, Maurice Utrillo and Pablo Picasso.

== Work ==
Baltasar Lobo was one of the artists who contributed to the Ciudad Universitaria de Caracas project and did the illustrations for the English translation of Platero y Yo by Juan Ramón Jiménez. In 1984, he received Spain's National Award for Plastic Arts.

== Museum ==
Baltasar Lobo died in 1993 and was buried in Paris in the Cimetière du Montparnasse. The Museo Baltasar Lobo (museum) is in the city of Zamora, Spain near his birthplace.
