= Rectory Plaza (Central University of Venezuela) =

Plaza del Rectorado
UNESCO World Heritage Site
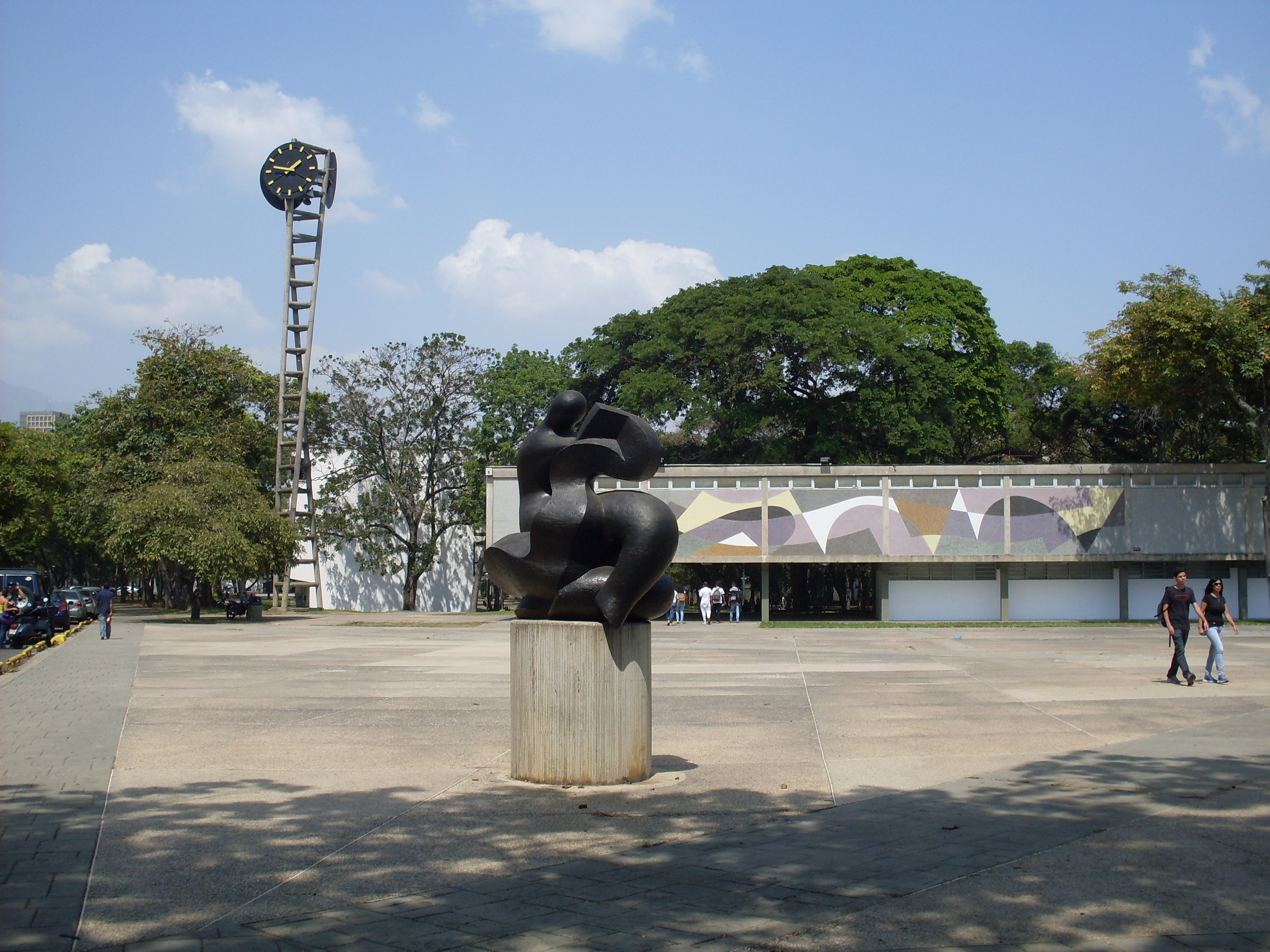
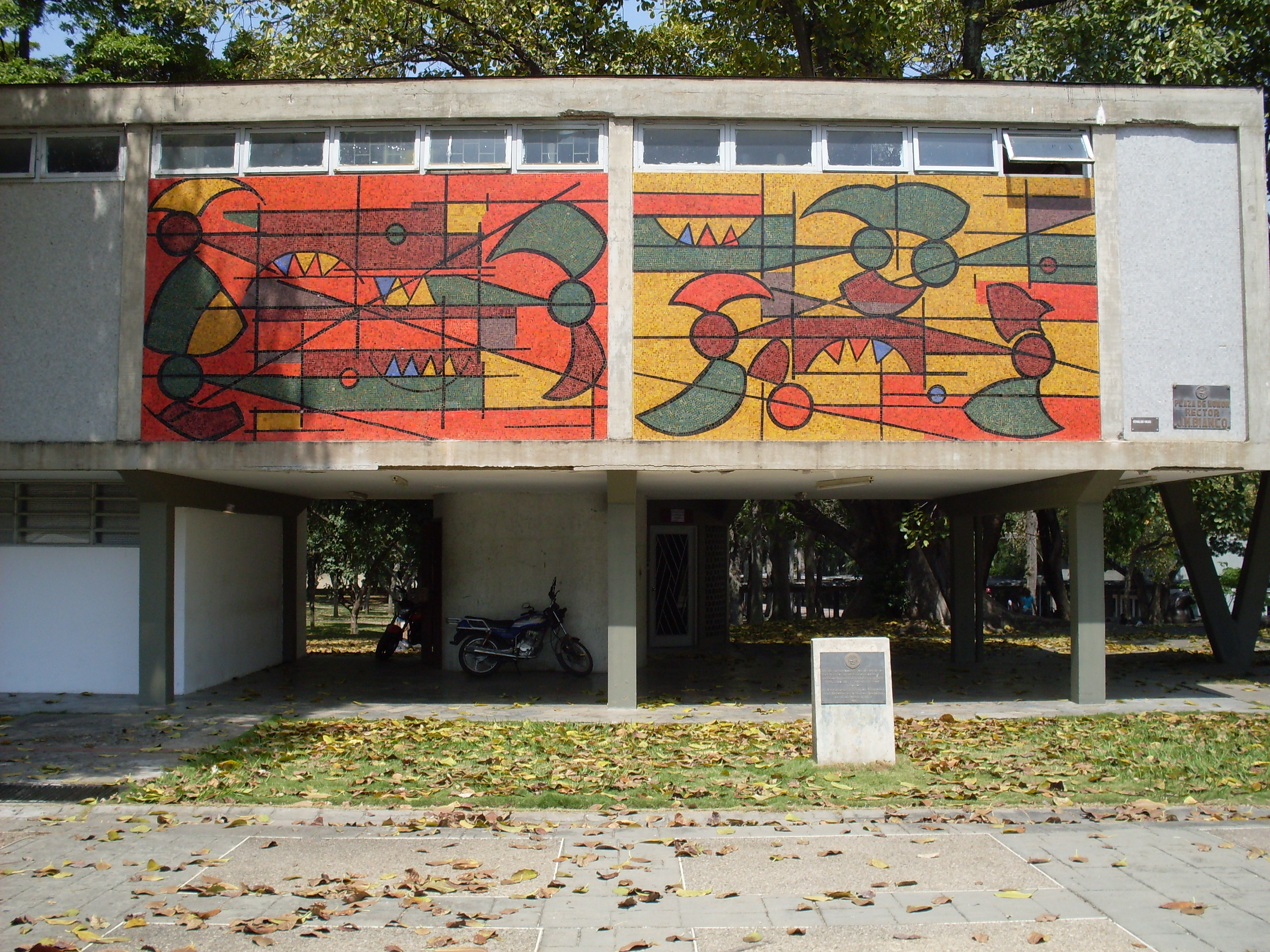
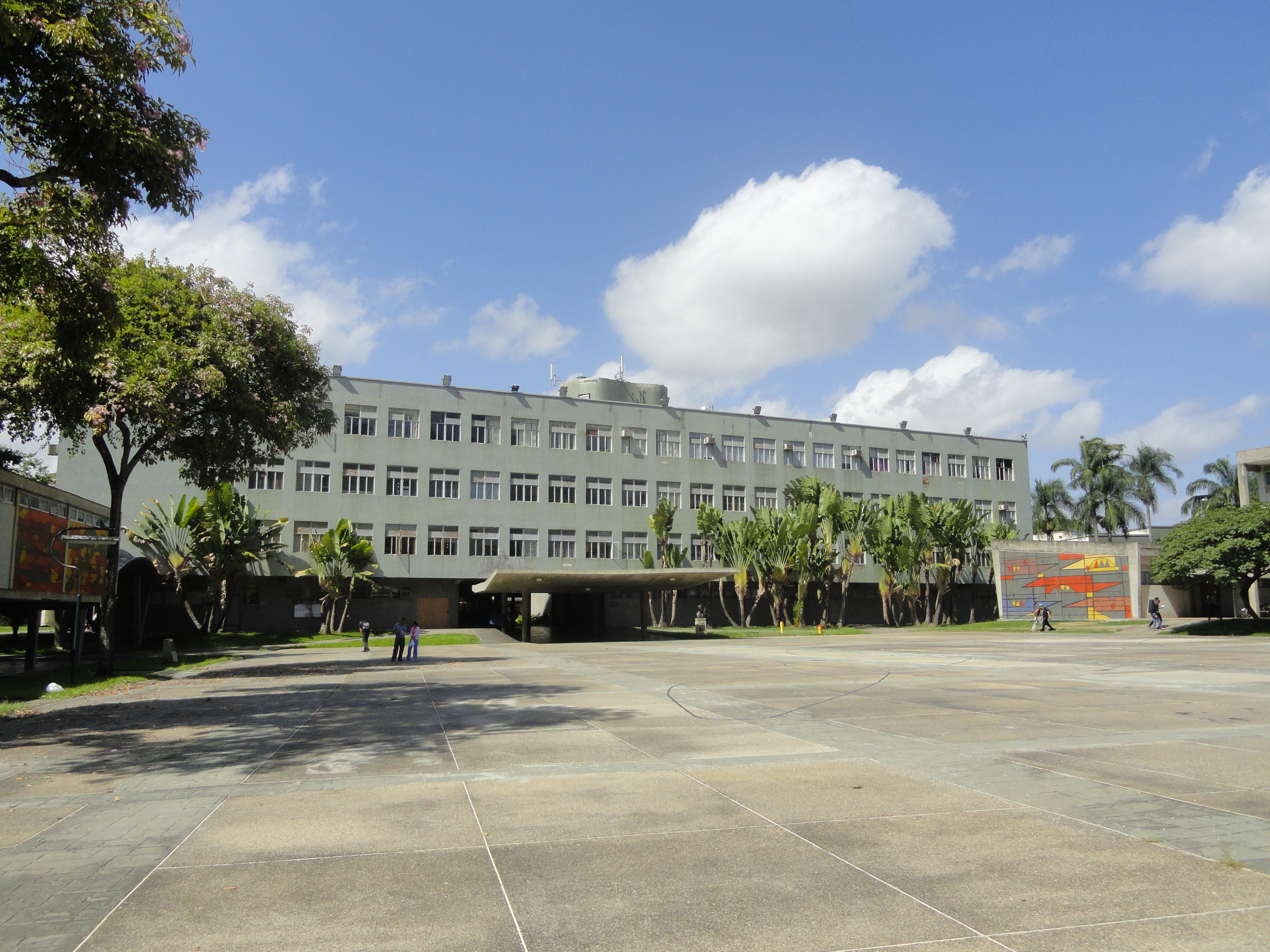

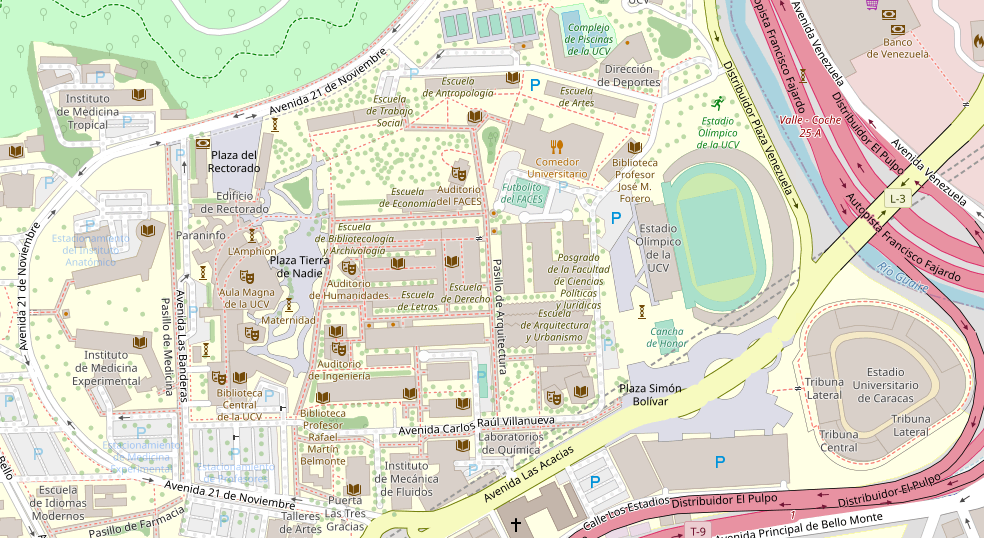
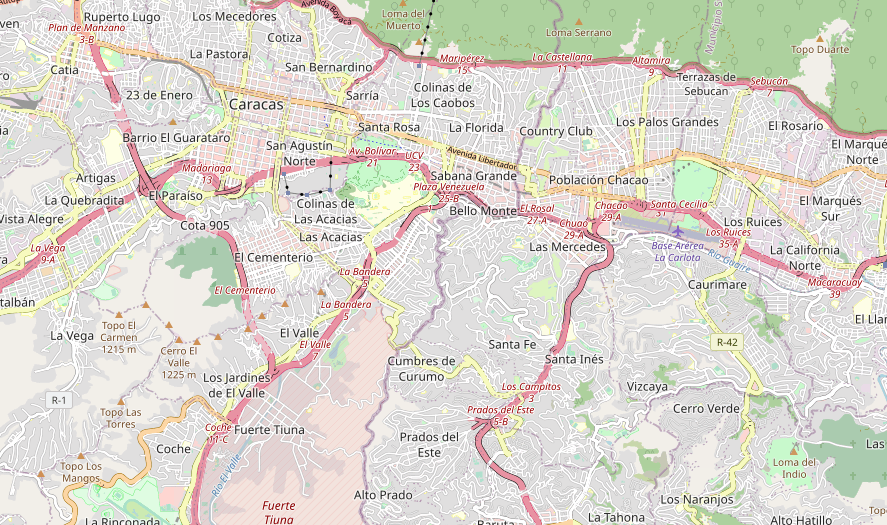
- Location within UCV Conjunto Central Location within Caracas Location within Venezuela
- Location: University City of Caracas, Venezuela
- Criteria: Cultural: (i), (iv)
- Reference: 986
- Inscription: 2000 (24th Session)
- Coordinates: 10°29′31.5″N 66°53′27″W

Rectory Plaza (Spanish: plaza del Rectorado de la UCV), originally The Empty Plaza (Spanish: La Plaza Vacía), is the name of a space located within the University City of Caracas, the campus of the Central University of Venezuela, in the San Pedro parish in the west of the city of Caracas.

The plaza is emblematic of the university, with there being activities of all kinds: cultural, academic, political, social, etc. Here you will find the Rectory of the university and the UCV Clock Tower.

As part of the campus, it was made a World Heritage Site in 2000. It is accessible from Plaza Venezuela by the Puerto Tamanaco. It was originally inaugurated on 2 December 1953 as a parking lot with additional designs from Francisco Narváez.

President Jaime Lusinchi, as a graduate of the Central University of Venezuela, sought during his government to improve relations between the government and the university, and among its measures was the construction of the Plaza del Rectorado in what was initially a parking area. The new plaza was designed by the Faculty of Architecture. The agency responsible for contracting was the Ministry of Public Works, engineer Juan Pedro del Moral, the Bomanite construction company of Venezuela, and Jorge Casado Salicetti.

== See also ==
- Plaza Bolívar (Caracas)
