= Clock Tower (Central University of Venezuela) =

Clock tower in Caracas, Venezuela

Torre del Reloj
- Clock Tower (English)
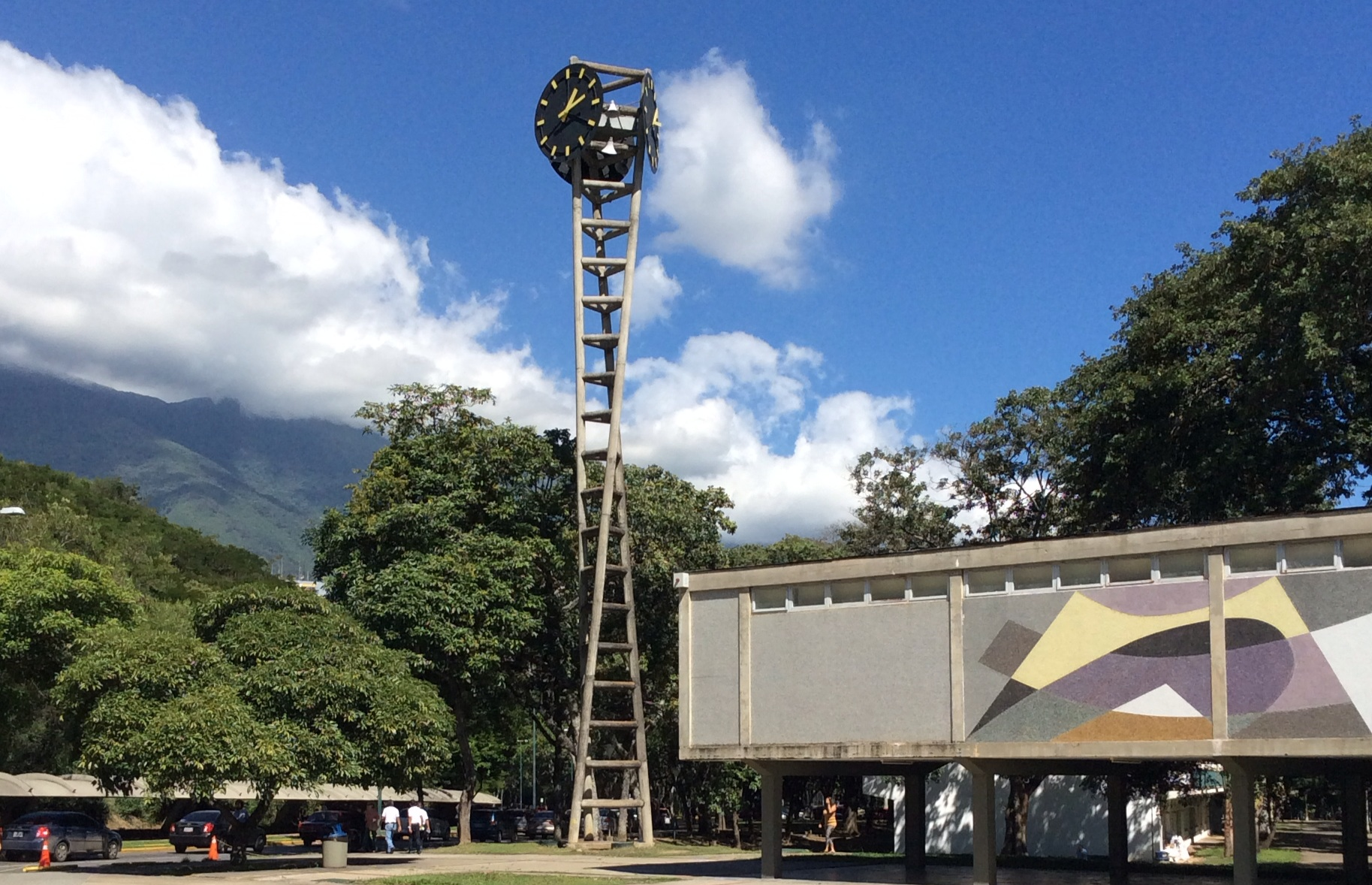
- Artist: Carlos Raúl Villanueva, Juan Otaola Paván
- Year: 1954
- Location: University City of Caracas; Caracas, Venezuela; 10°29′33″N 66°53′25.3″W

The UCV Clock Tower, also known by its Spanish name Torre del Reloj de la UCV, or Reloj de la UCV, is a monument made of prestressed concrete. It is by the Rectory Plaza of the Central University of Venezuela in the University City of Caracas, and was built between 1953 and 1954.

The tower was proposed by architect Carlos Raúl Villanueva as a joint piece built by the engineer Juan Otaola Paván, with both contributing to the design. Its twisted columns were designed with new structural engineering principles.

== Background ==
The Venezuelan architect and designer Carlos Raúl Villanueva began designing the University City of Caracas campus in the 1940s, beginning construction in the 1950s. In a time of prevailing modernism in Latin America, Villanueva had a stylistic ideology for the project he called the "Synthesis of the Arts", combining the arts and architecture and creating artistic pieces that could also serve functional purposes.

== Design and symbolism ==
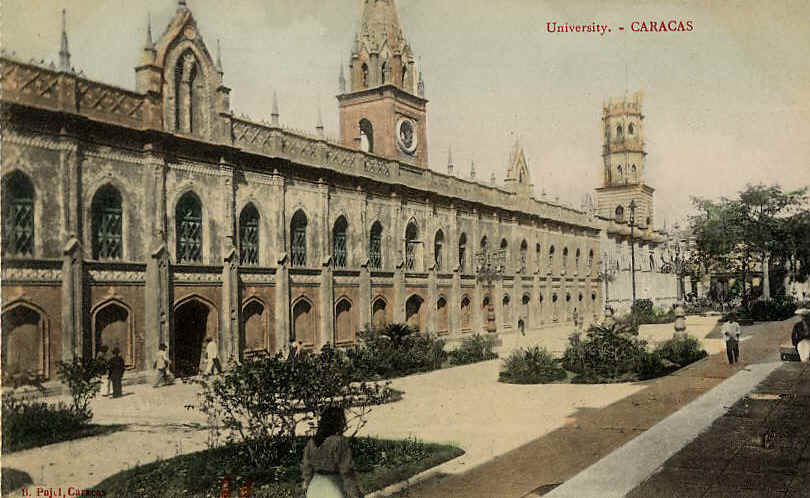
The old main university building, clock tower in the center

The clock tower is an independent structure, and designed to stand out from its surroundings, which it towers over. This is said to be in contrast with the clock towers or faces common to most universities; though many universities will have one, they are typically on the facade of an otherwise individually important building or structure and are sidelined. By giving the clock tower the focus of the space within Rectory Plaza, it is said (by one of the university's preservation groups) to further emphasize the purpose of clocks at educational institutions in marking real and symbolic passages of time. The clock tower has three bases, each a twisted column. These symbolize art, architecture and academics, with the twisted columns creating the appearance of three A's. It is 25 metres (82 ft) tall, and so defies the low-rise design of the rest of the Rectory Plaza. Villanueva and Otaola also chose to keep the design of the clock tower "pure", with nothing extra needed or added.

Professor Silvia Hernández of the university noted that the design elements of the base of the clock tower both work functionally to support three clock faces, but also represent a passage to a modern university, leaving the associations of the old clock tower, which was part of the Convent of San Francisco, in the past.

The structure retains its original clockwork, electricity and sound systems dating from the 1950s. The electrical system was faulty by the 2010s, but is still used, making the clock run slow; the sound system was damaged in 2002 but also continues to be used.

== Structure ==
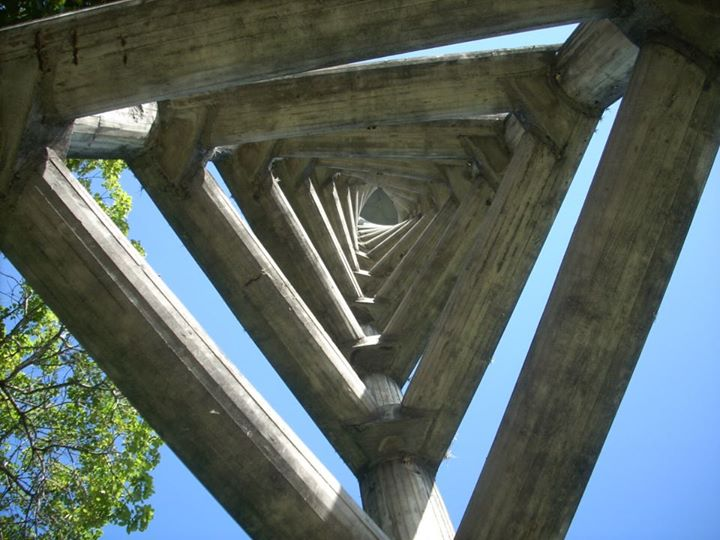
View from beneath the tower

Engineer Otaola built the clock tower, contributing to its structural design. The geometry of the twisted columns of the three bases took a lot of torsion to hold, ultimately being supported by the crossbars between columns, which give the tower stability; the designers wanted to preserve the tower's slender nature and so only adjusted the twist by the smallest margins possible.

Otaola said that, when presented with Villanueva's designs, he did not change anything fundamental about the piece, which was intended to stand as an obelisk, but added the twist of the three legs; he explained that both in terms of function and Villanueva's artistry it was a better option, and one that Villanueva immediately responded to positively. Otaola proposed the twist by demonstrating with three pencils, sticking their tips in cardboard and twisting them.

The company that manufactured the columns of the tower later used the same techniques when contributing to the build of General Rafael Urdaneta Bridge, spanning Lake Maracaibo. The techniques (based on Otaola's plans) were revolutionary at the time, as explained by construction historian Nancy Dembo in her book on the impact of Villanueva's works.

== Legacy ==
The clock tower is said by a Venezuelan art guide to be "an obligatory reference point within the facilities of the Central University of Venezuela and one of the best known points of the city of Caracas". Since 2000 it has been part of the World Heritage Site that comprises the University City of Caracas.
