= University City of Caracas =

Campus of the Central University of Venezuela in Caracas, Venezuela

Ciudad Universitaria de Caracas
UNESCO World Heritage Site
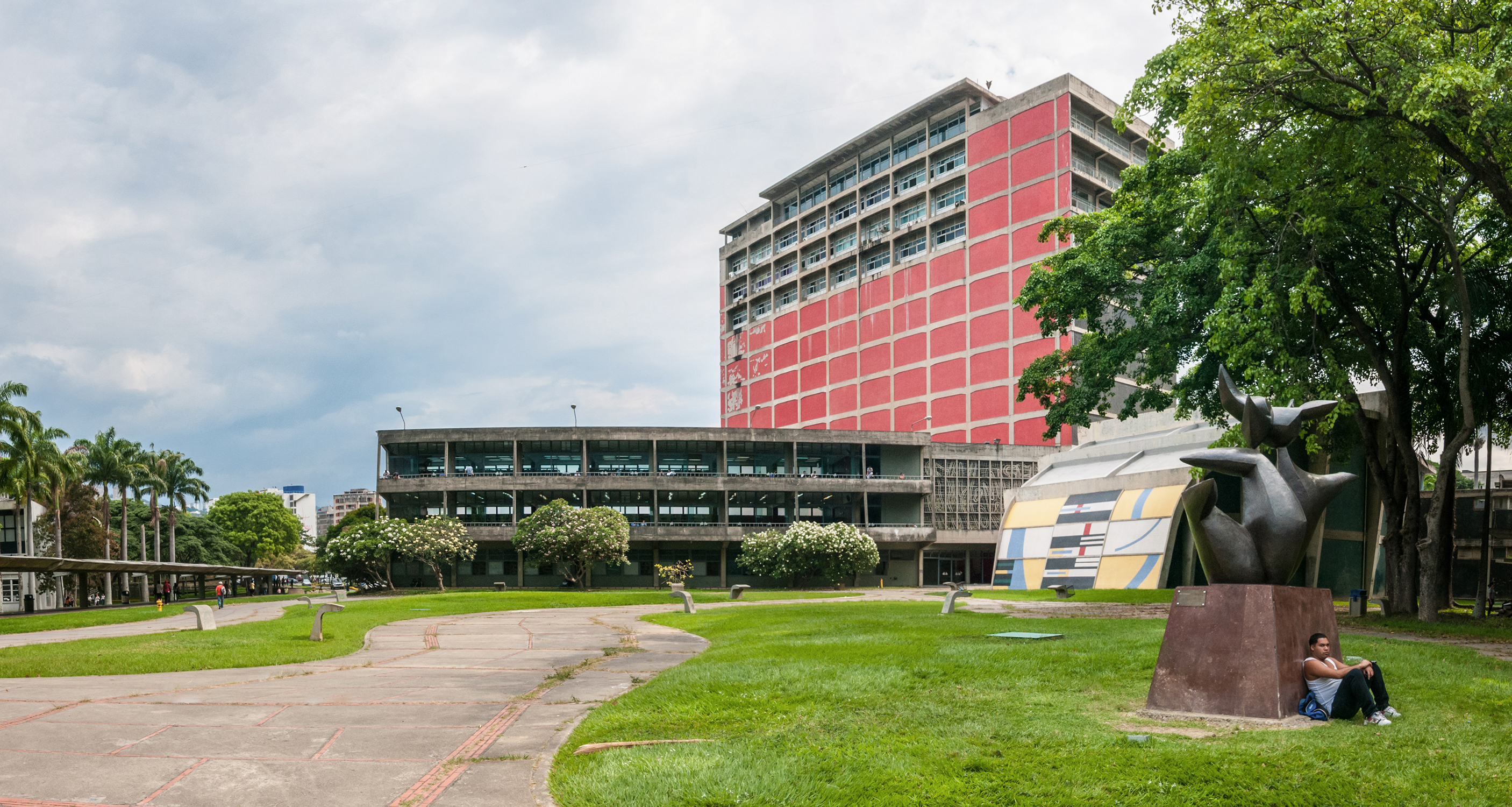
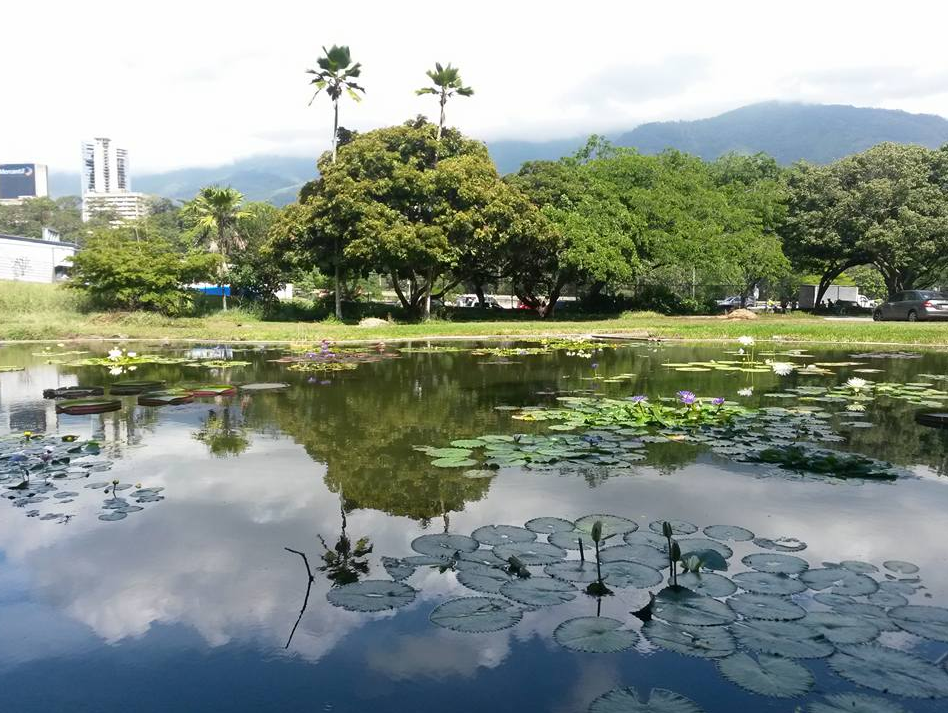
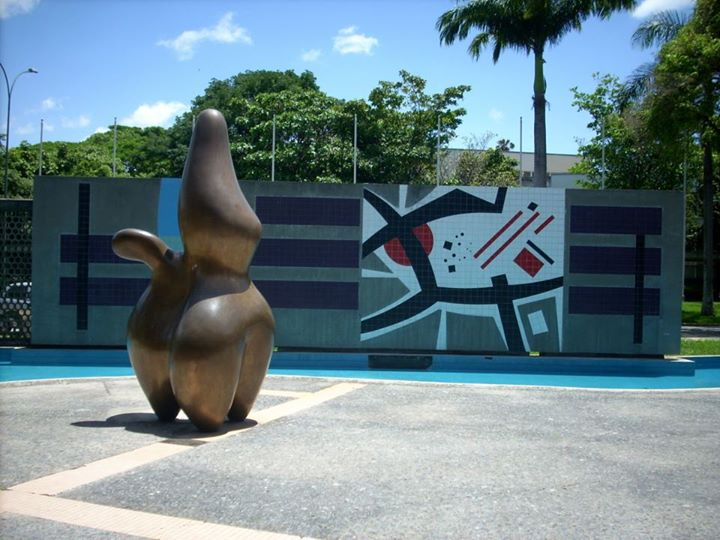
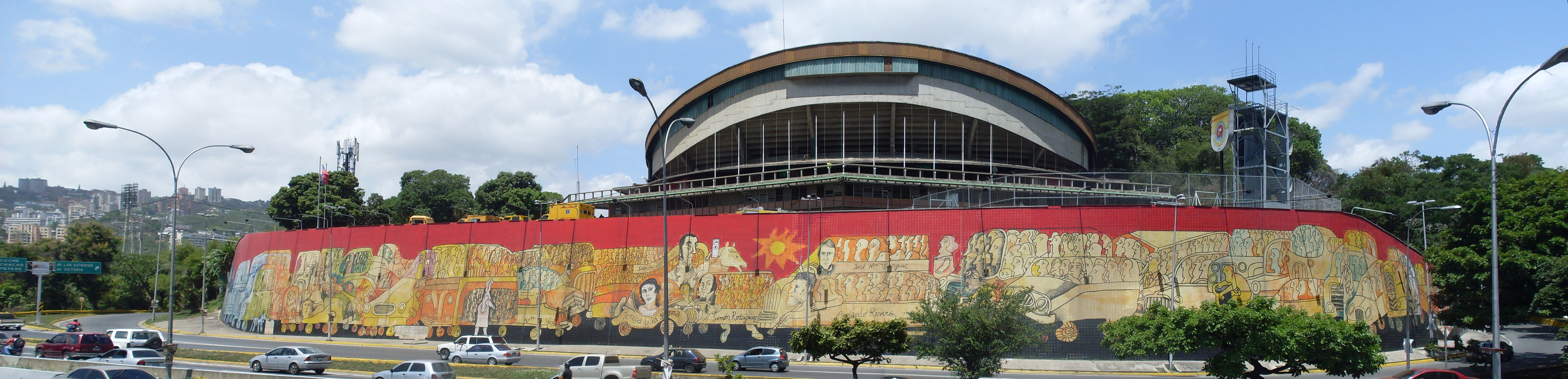

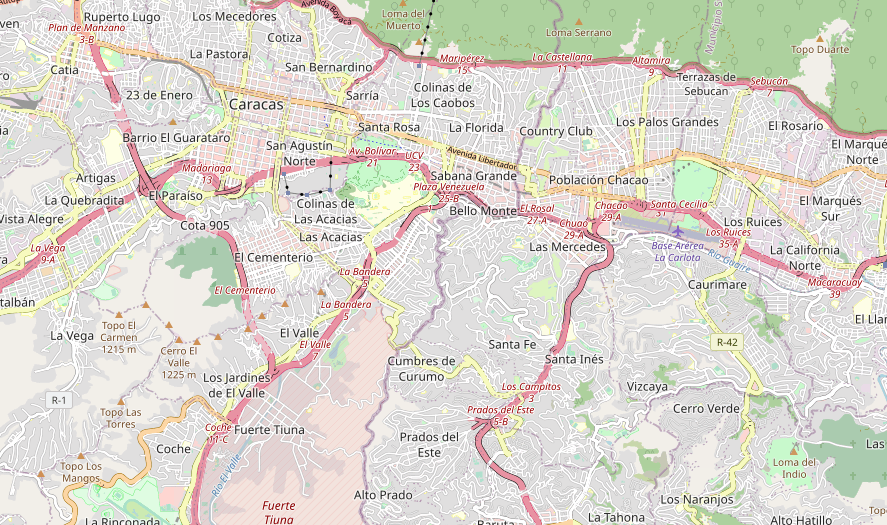
- Location within Caracas Location within Venezuela
- Location: Libertador Bolivarian Municipality, Capital District, Caracas, Venezuela
- Criteria: Cultural: (i), (iv)
- Reference: 986
- Inscription: 2000 (24th Session)
- Area: 164,203 ha (405,750 acres)
- Coordinates: 10°29′27″N 66°53′26″W

The University City of Caracas (Spanish: Ciudad Universitaria de Caracas), also known by the acronym CUC, is the main campus of the Central University of Venezuela (UCV), located in central Caracas, the capital of Venezuela. It was designed by the Venezuelan architect Carlos Raúl Villanueva and was declared a World Heritage Site by UNESCO in 2000. The Ciudad Universitaria de Caracas is considered a "masterpiece" of architecture and urban planning, and greatly influenced Venezuelan architecture.

Villanueva oversaw design from the end of the Second World War, and oversaw the campus construction for 20 years. He gave his skills and also vision of design principles to it, and it remains the only university campus designed by a single architect in the 20th century that has received cultural heritage recognition by UNESCO.

The campus comprises a variety of different environments; its northern half is a Botanical Garden, with extensive sports facilities at its east, west and south. There are many different areas of the campus separated by Faculty and School, including Sciences, Architecture, Humanities, and Medicine. These converge in the center of the campus at the Tierra de nadie — green space and woodland pertaining to no discipline — and the Plaza Cubierta complex of shared buildings and the titular museum of permanent modern art features.

Though elements of the campus face both natural and deliberate deterioration, it remains a landmark of Venezuela, and maintains its excellence in design and planning. It has been included on the 2010 and 2014 lists of the World Monuments Fund for special preservation efforts.

== Construction and design planning ==
Video of locations around the campus in 2019

The campus and buildings of UCV are considered to be Villanueva's masterpiece. Built on the site of the old Hacienda Ibarra (which originally belonged to Simon Bolívar's family) and connected to the new city center at Plaza Venezuela, the project required a massive undertaking in both urban planning and architectural design. The selected location gave Villanueva a unique opportunity to apply his conscious integration of art and architecture on a grand scale. This vast urban complex of about 2 km^{2} included a total of forty buildings and it became one of the most successful applications of Modern Architecture in Latin America. Villanueva worked closely with all the artists who contributed with their oeuvres and personally supervised the project for over 25 years until the late 1960s when his deteriorating health forced him to leave some buildings in the design stage.

After the death of Juan Vicente Gómez, urban renewal became a large focus; Caracas saw "extraordinary urban-renewal plans", including Villanueva's "Synthesis of Arts" architecture, beginning with the El Silencio complex in the city center.^{:56} Though the campus is unlikely to be seen as an urban project by modern definitions, it is seen as among the grand architecture that put Caracas on the map and helped to promote tourism and migration.^{:57}

In 1939, commissioned groups began the new urban planning of Caracas, but "bureaucratic obligations" restricted this to Libertador municipality.^{:55} The government of President Isaías Medina Angarita bought the Hacienda Ibarra in 1942, in order to expand the university beyond the limited space it had at the Saint Francis Convent. Shut down several times throughout the 1940s, the planning of the campus resumed towards the end of the Second World War.^{:55} Construction began in 1944, and was continuous until 1967.^{:57-59, 355} University City is an example of one of Villanueva's "museographic" spaces, which take the qualities of museums and apply them to public places.^{:350}

Villanueva visited France in 1944 and again in 1948, gaining inspiration for the artistic and architectural design of the campus. In 1944 he had done the first studies and a tentative plan. Villanueva altered his designs in 1949; he was able to redesign and complicate the process because of the economic and political situation he and Venezuela were in, wanting to do so for personal and professional reasons.^{:355} The University City is also a model city, which supposedly brought into reality urban visions of utopia.^{:360}

The first buildings erected included the medical complex. In 1949 the initial designs were changed, with the stadiums being built in 1950 and inaugurated in 1951. The stadiums construction signaled a new phase in developing the Conjunto Central (Central Complex) of the campus.^{:355}

The campus construction was initiated at its western end, where it has a symmetrical design along its east–west axis. When the Central Complex began construction, the symmetry was not applied, Villanueva instead initiating his synthesis of the arts for this part of the campus design.

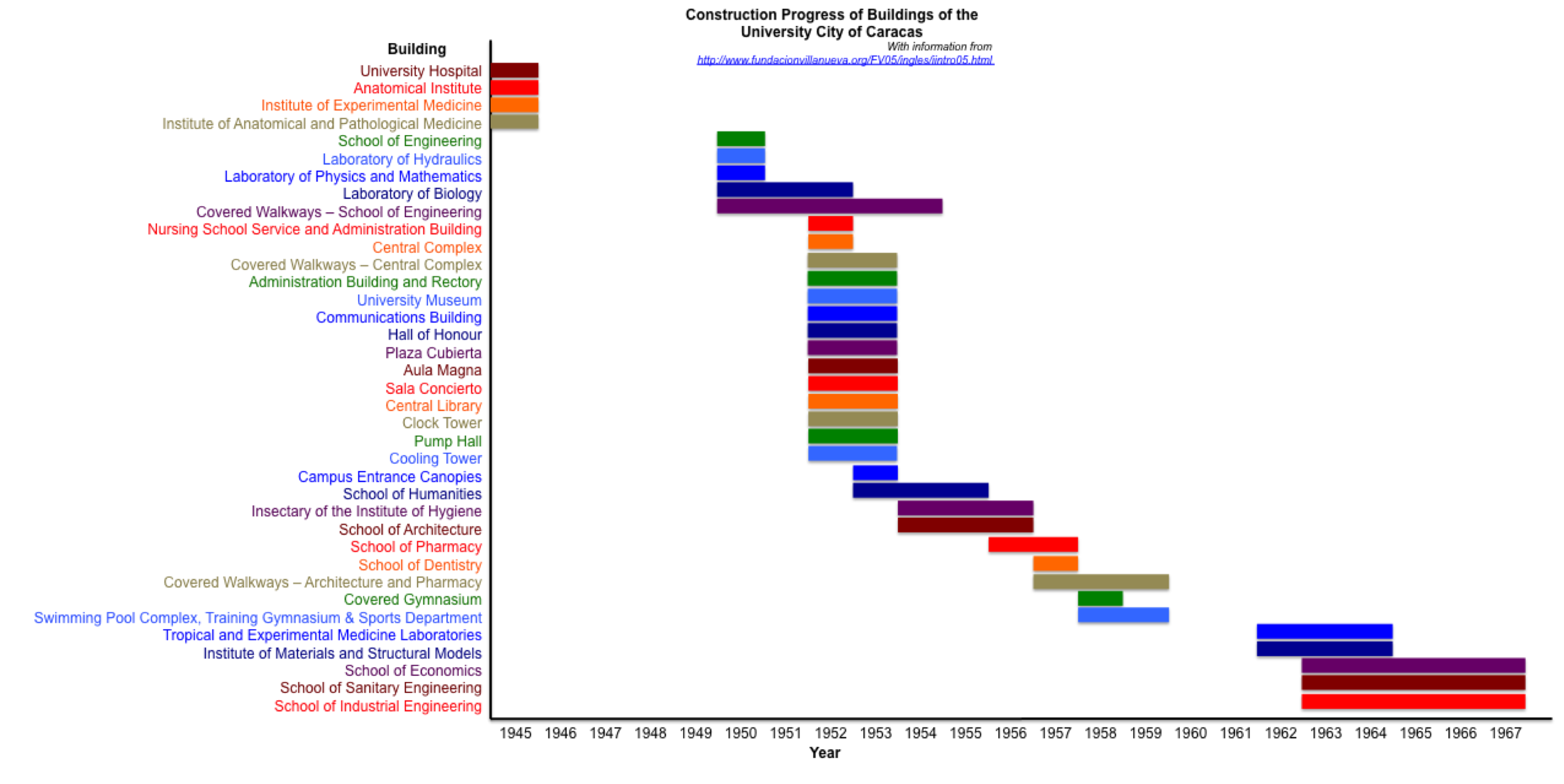

== Botanical Garden ==
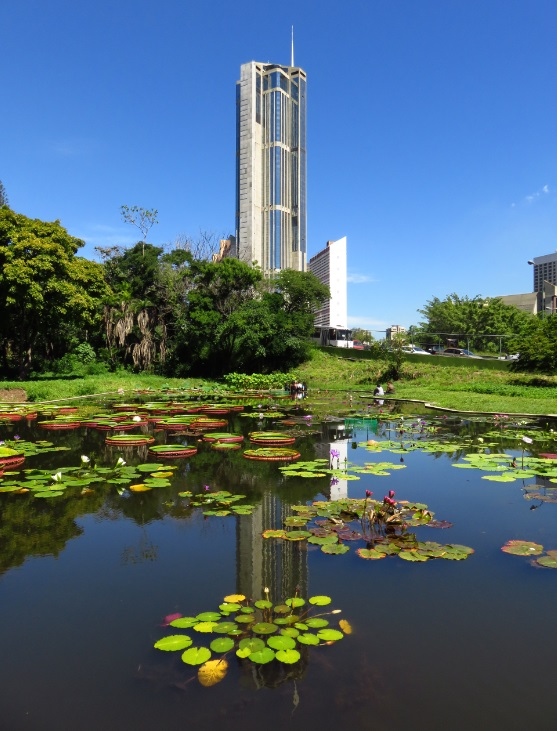
Laguna Venezuela in August 2016, with water lilies (left); Parque Central is behind

The Caracas Botanical Garden is within the campus, and contains a large collection of international plants. Over its history, it has featured species from Central and South America, Africa, and Asia. The greatest number of plants that the Botanical Garden has housed was 2,500; these belonged to over 200 species, half of which were native to the country. The Palmetum of the center at one point held 4,000 specimens of 250 species. The gardens were opened in 1952 and occupy 70 hectares, including the Henri Pittier Library and National Herbarium.

Like other areas of the campus, neglect has caused the upkeep of the gardens to suffer. Lack of irrigation and parasitic species has caused plants to die and the beauty of the gardens to deteriorate. Events that have impacted the health of the gardens include the 2010 El Niño drought, the invasion of the Giant African snail, thefts of groundskeeping equipment, electrical blackouts, and other financial issues restricting the care and management of the facilities. According to staff in August 2019, no water had entered the gardens' pipes since the middle of January 2019. A volunteering plan was created to bring in personal water and manually irrigate the plants.

=== Lake Venezuela ===
The Venezuela Lagoon is the largest body of water on the campus, and takes the shape of the country it is named for. By 2018, the lagoon was reported to have lost half its water; the native Santa Cruz (Victoria amazonica) water lilies, which were 8 ft across and strong enough to hold people, had died out. Other lagoons in the gardens are completely dry.

== Plaza Cubierta and Tierra de nadie complex ==
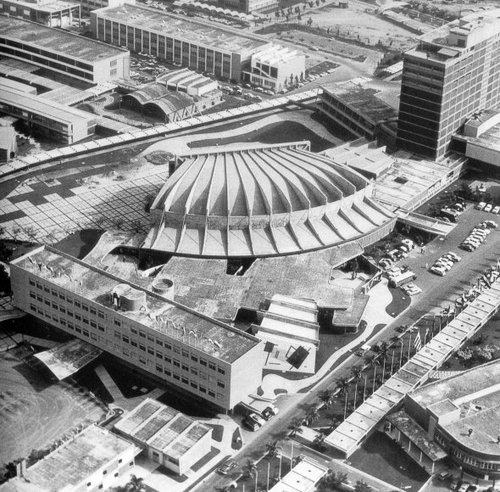
Historical aerial view of the Central Complex

The Conjunto Central (Central Complex) of the University City houses many academic, administrative, and social buildings, as well as some of the campus's more famous artworks.

The Plaza Cubierta is an indoor-outdoor space designed as an "open museum", combining art into the environment and architecture into art, and is considered one of the most important artistic and cultural works of the country. It also connects many different buildings in the Central Complex.^{:356-358} Villanueva wanted the Plaza Cubierta to be the heart of the campus, the physical and cultural center, being inspired by halls and city center plazas in Europe. It was inaugurated with the attached Aula Magna on 2 March 1954.^{:359}

Buildings connected by the Plaza Cubierta include: the main library, the rectory offices, the Federation of Students Center (students' union), the Aula Magna, the Paraninfo, and the concert hall (Sala de Conciertos). Of these, and all Villanueva's works, the Aula Magna is considered the "consummate example of synthesis".^{:356} The Plaza Cubierta is noted for having perforated walls, sections of open roof, and a series of ramps linking elements, giving it a feeling of flow. In 2013, an open library incentive was initiated in the covered walkways of the Plaza Cubierta, as an art project and to promote book-sharing and enjoyment of the campus recreational spaces.

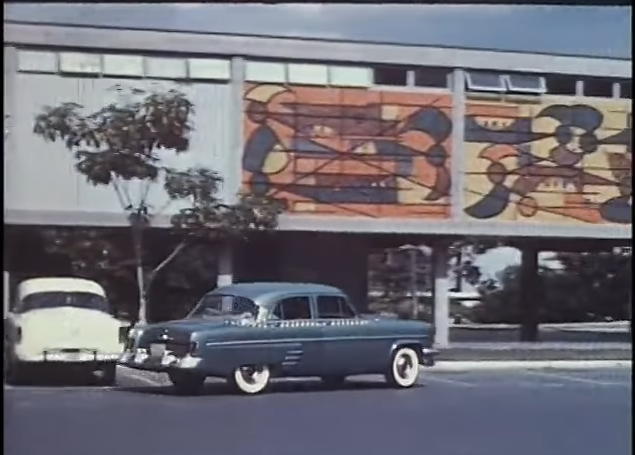
Jim visits the University City in Assignment: Venezuela. He parks in what is now a pedestrian plaza.

The Rectory Plaza was intended to be a car park, and was built in 1952. However, too many people wanted to use it, becoming overpopulated with cars, and so it closed to cars in or after February 1958. The Rectory building of UCV contains offices of university and student management, including the office for the current Rector and the Federation of Students Center (Students' union). Where there was a post office for the university is now a Bank of Venezuela location. The Rectory Plaza contains large murals, and the UCV Clock Tower.

The Modernist art is not only historically renowned, but was used to the benefit of propaganda in the 1956 American film Assignment: Venezuela, trying to encourage oil workers to move to Maracaibo. Jim is taken on a tour of Venezuela, and arrives at the then newly built campus in an imported car, admiring the murals and statues.^{:97-98} In the film, he arrives in what would become Rectory Plaza, when it was still a car park.

Behind the buildings of the Rectory Plaza, and jutting out from the main body of the Plaza Cubierta, is the Paraninfo. This is a small performing arts space, with large stained-glass windows.

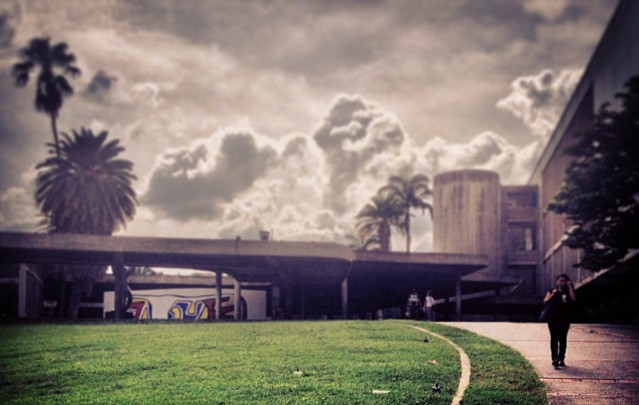
The Plaza Cubierta is an open space with waving concrete-covered walkways. Several artworks are open-air, with gaps designed in the concrete to spotlight them.

The Aula Magna is located between the main plaza elements of the Plaza Cubierta and the University's main library building. The interior of the hall is considered artistically and architecturally significant, especially its most notable feature, Alexander Calder's acoustic 'clouds', which serve both aesthetic and practical functions. They contributed to the science of interior space acoustics. The concrete shell-shaped building exterior is also architecturally significant. It has been named the "most important auditorium" at the university. The current director of the hall is Trina Medina, with the assistant director Rosario Silva Prieto.

Beyond the Aula Magna are the Sala de Conciertos and the Central Library. The entrance to the Sala de Conciertos is within the covered hallways that connect the spaces, marked by a large yellow mural; another predominantly yellow mural marks the back of the Sala de Conciertos, visible in the Tierra de nadie. The library features a distinct red tile design on its exterior. On an eastern wall it has a large stained-glass window designed by Fernand Léger.

Separating the Plaza Cubierta from the academic buildings and sporting facilities to the east is the Jorge Rodríguez Plaza, more commonly known as the Tierra de nadie (English: No-man's land). The Tierra de nadie is a public space that is one of the green spaces in the University City of Caracas. It takes its name because it is an area that belongs to none of the faculties that surround it.

Maciá Pintó describes the functional and artistic design of the Plaza Cubierta as:

"It is a space of permanence and circulation that branches out into covered passageways and parking lots. Designed with continuous and recurrent movement in mind, incorporating different routes and series of perspectives, connecting focal points to draw attention and orient circulation, the plaza's architecture is largely based on visual perception, but enjoying it leads to haptic experience and sensory synaesthesia. Light and shadow, contour and color, space and time are transformed into the movement of the living body, into the cycle of hours and years. These elements contribute to the persistence of the plaza's continuing mise-en-scène, to its daily making and unmaking." — Maciá Pintó, "Carlos Raúl Villanueva: The Synthesis with Venezuela", Alfredo Boulton and His Contemporaries: Critical Dialogues in Venezuelan Art, 2008^{:358}

== Sports facilities ==
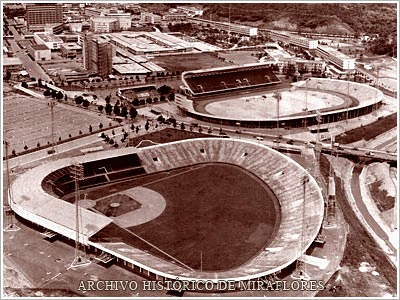
The Olympic (right) and University (left) Stadiums in 1953

The Olympic Stadium of the university is one of the design elements specifically highlighted by UNESCO. It is primarily an association football stadium, and the home ground of Caracas F.C.; it has seats for almost 24,000 people. As well as the football pitch, the Olympic Stadium contains a full size running track and spaces for athletic field events, including jumping tracks and sandpits. It also hosts rugby games.

The Covered Gymnasium is also a public space that is run by the university. It is at the far northern end of the university campus, with the exception of the Botanical Garden, and is noted for its shape and peculiar roof. It also features a giant mural, marking the edge of the campus by the freeway, featuring important historical figures of Venezuela.

The Estadio Universitario is a baseball stadium, next to the Olympic Stadium, and is the home field of two teams. It can hold just over 25,000 people.

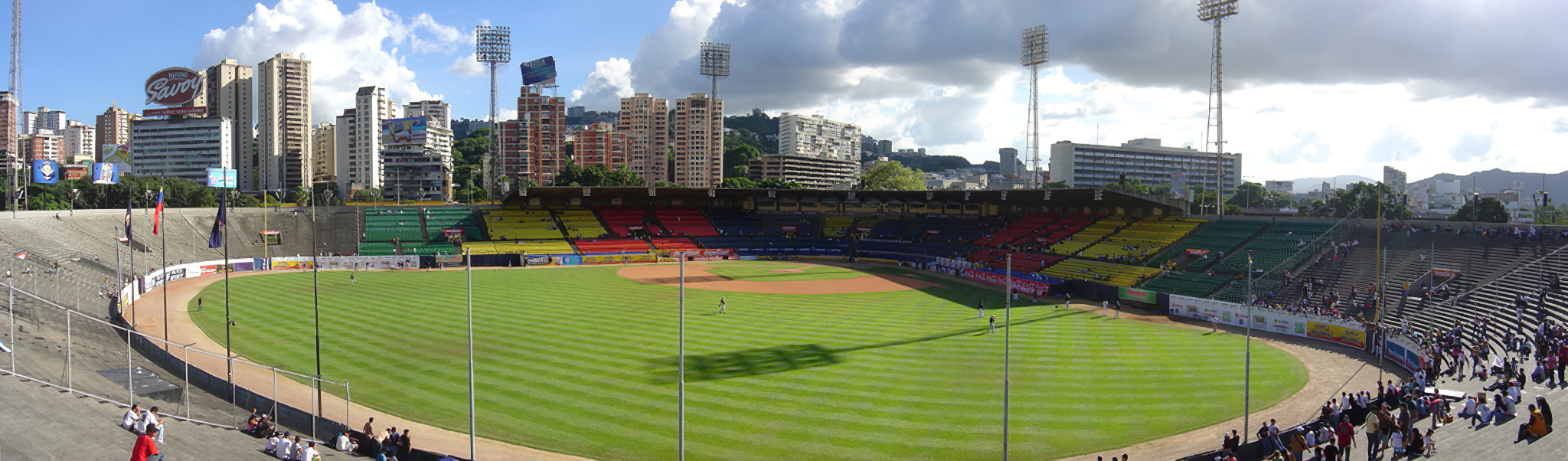
Panorama of Estadio Universitario de Caracas

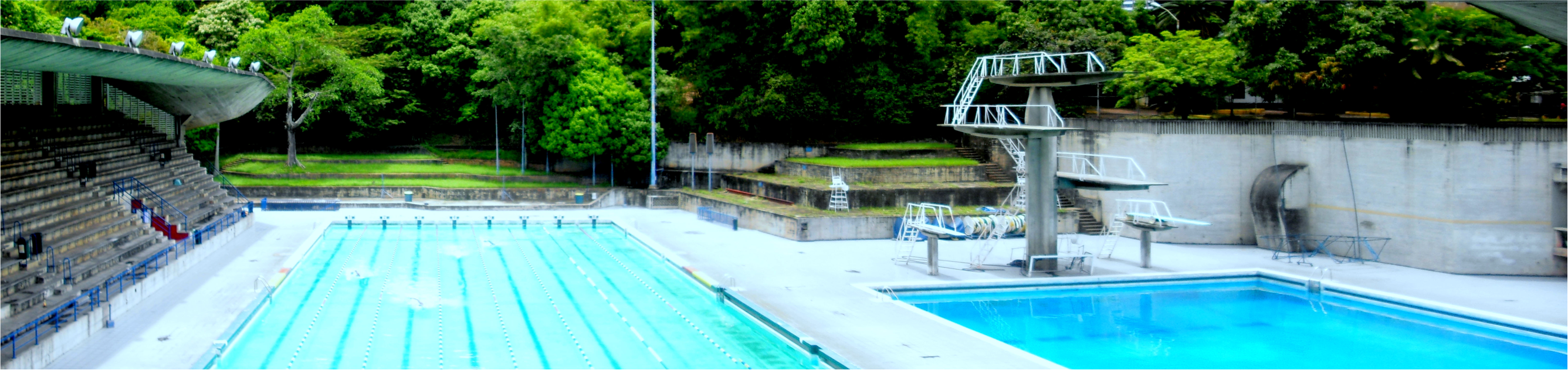
Panorama of the Olympic and diving pools

== Artwork ==
Several artworks placed on the campus had been pre-fabricated and needed adjustment to fit either physically or aesthetically. Some of these works include Arp's Berger des nuages, Laurens's L'Amphion, Pevsner's Projection dynamique au 30e degré (lit. "Dynamic projection at the 30th degree"), 1953 and Lobo's Maternidad. Most other works were designed in a process from afar, with heavy conversation between artist and architect, but some murals were created on-site, including the works of Léger and Vasarely.^{:359} (Note: Unless otherwise referenced, the titles and dates are sourced from Pintó's commentary.^{:359}) The international artists who contributed to the campus include: Hans Arp and Sophie Taeuber-Arp, André Bloc, Alexander Calder, Wifredo Lam, Henri Laurens, Fernand Léger, Baltasar Lobo, Antoine Pevsner, and Victor Vasarely. Venezuelan artists involved include: Miguel Arroyo, Armando Barrios, Omar Carreño, Carlos González Bogen, Pedro León Castro, Mateo Manaure, Francisco Narváez, Pascual Navarro, Alirio Oramas, Alejandro Otero, Héctor Poleo, Braulio Salazar, Jesús-Rafael Soto, Víctor Varela, Oswaldo Vigas, and Lisbhet Mariela Ojeda D'Elía.

Selection of artworks in University City of Caracas
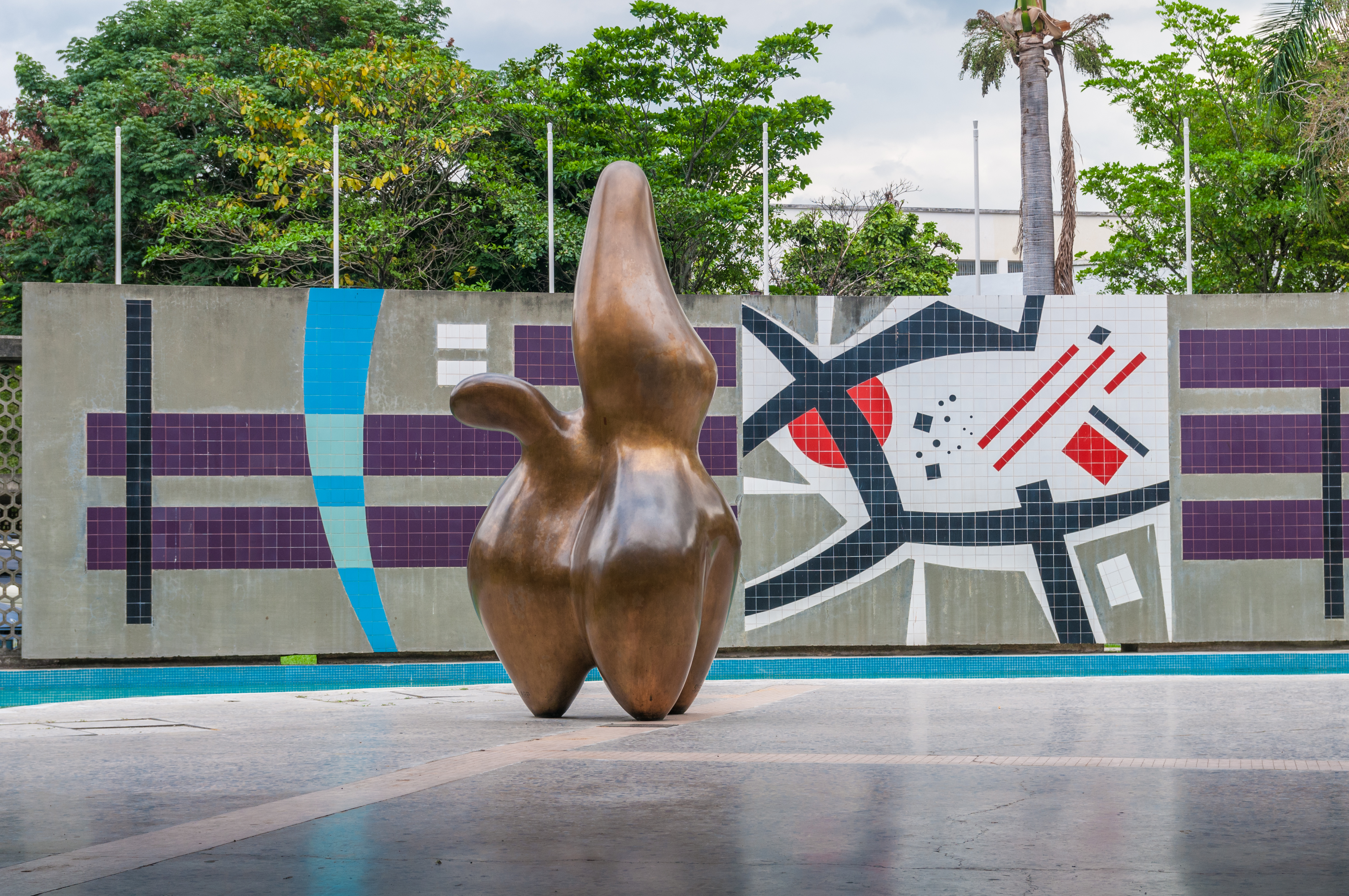
Berger des nuages by Jean (Hans) Arp, 1953

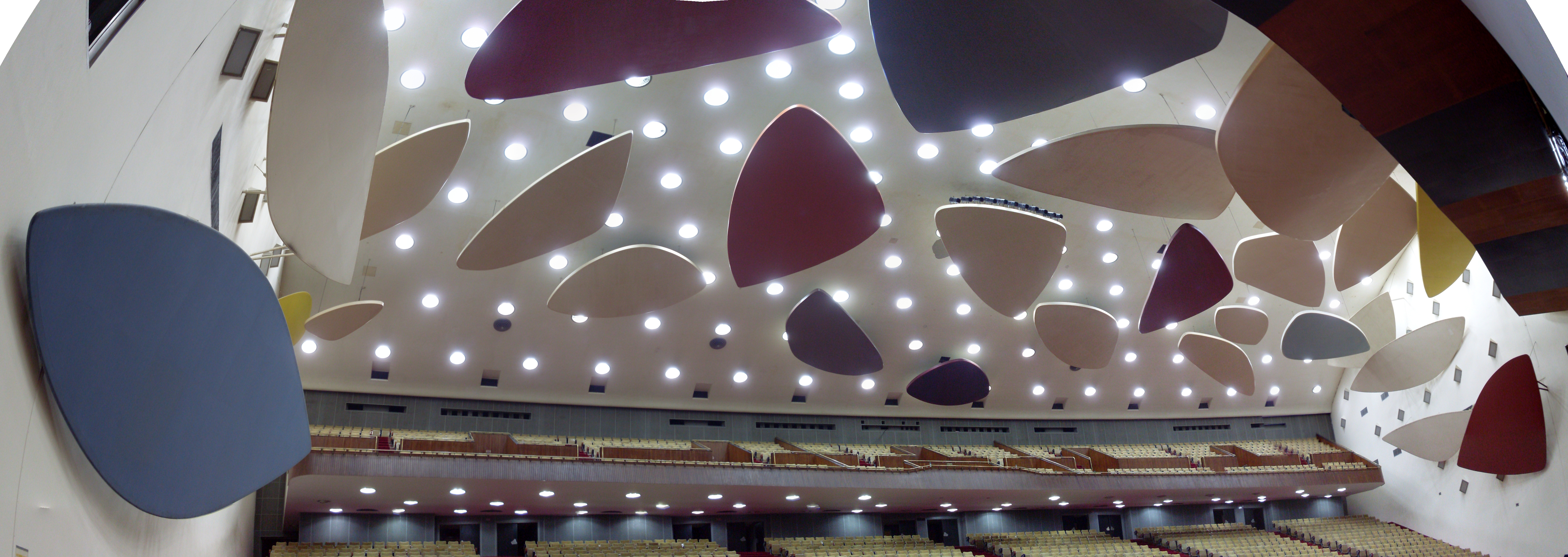
Floating Clouds by Alexander Calder, 1953

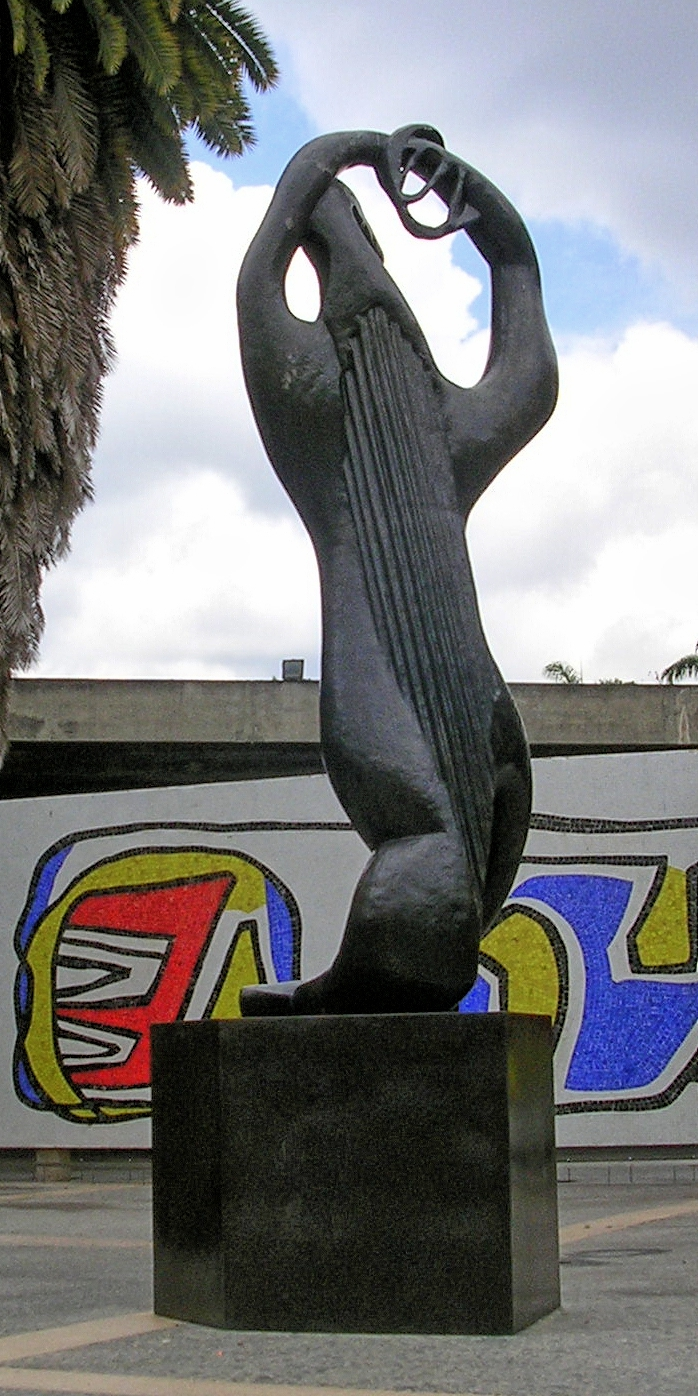
L'Amphion by Henri Laurens, 1953

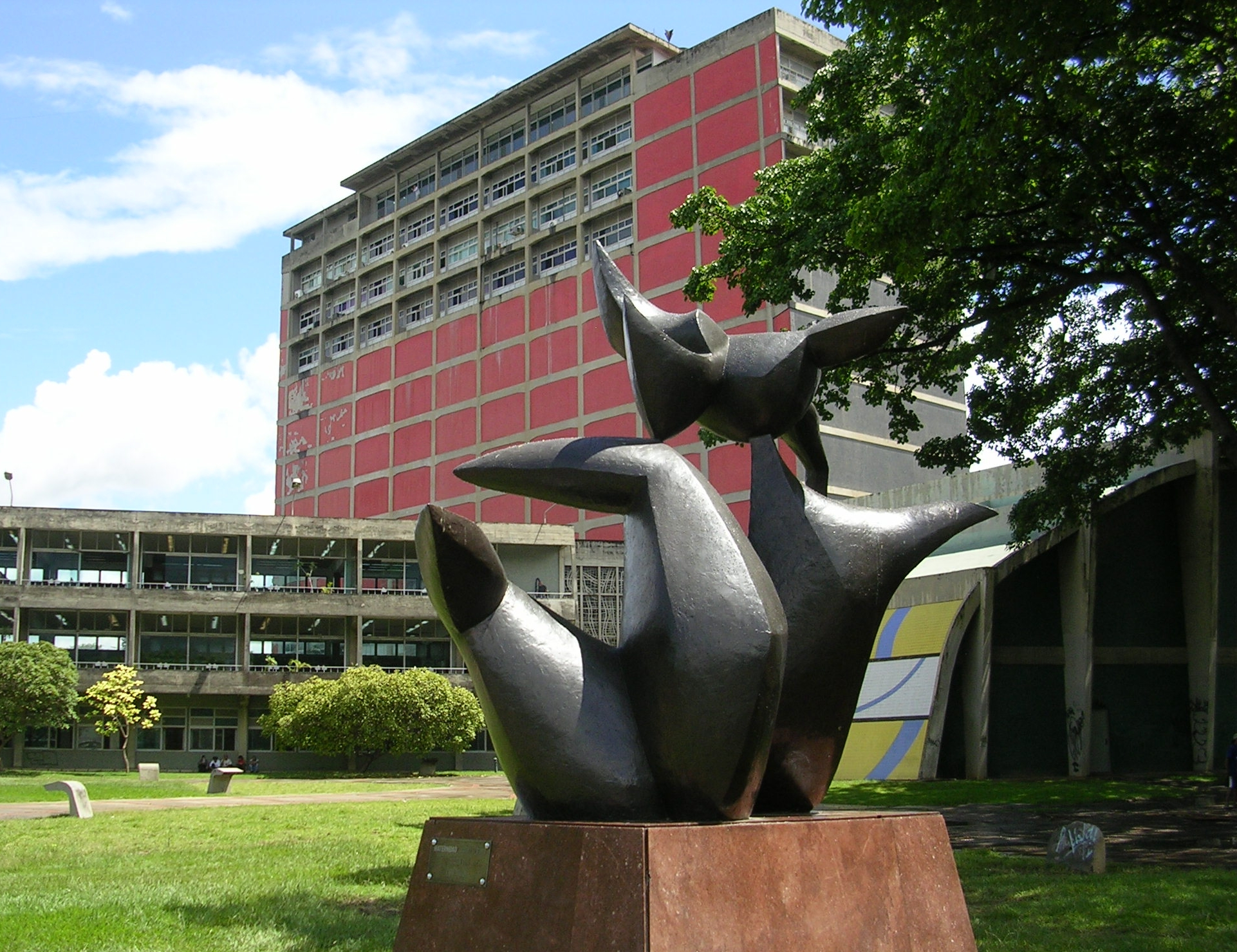
Maternidad by Baltasar Lobo, 1953

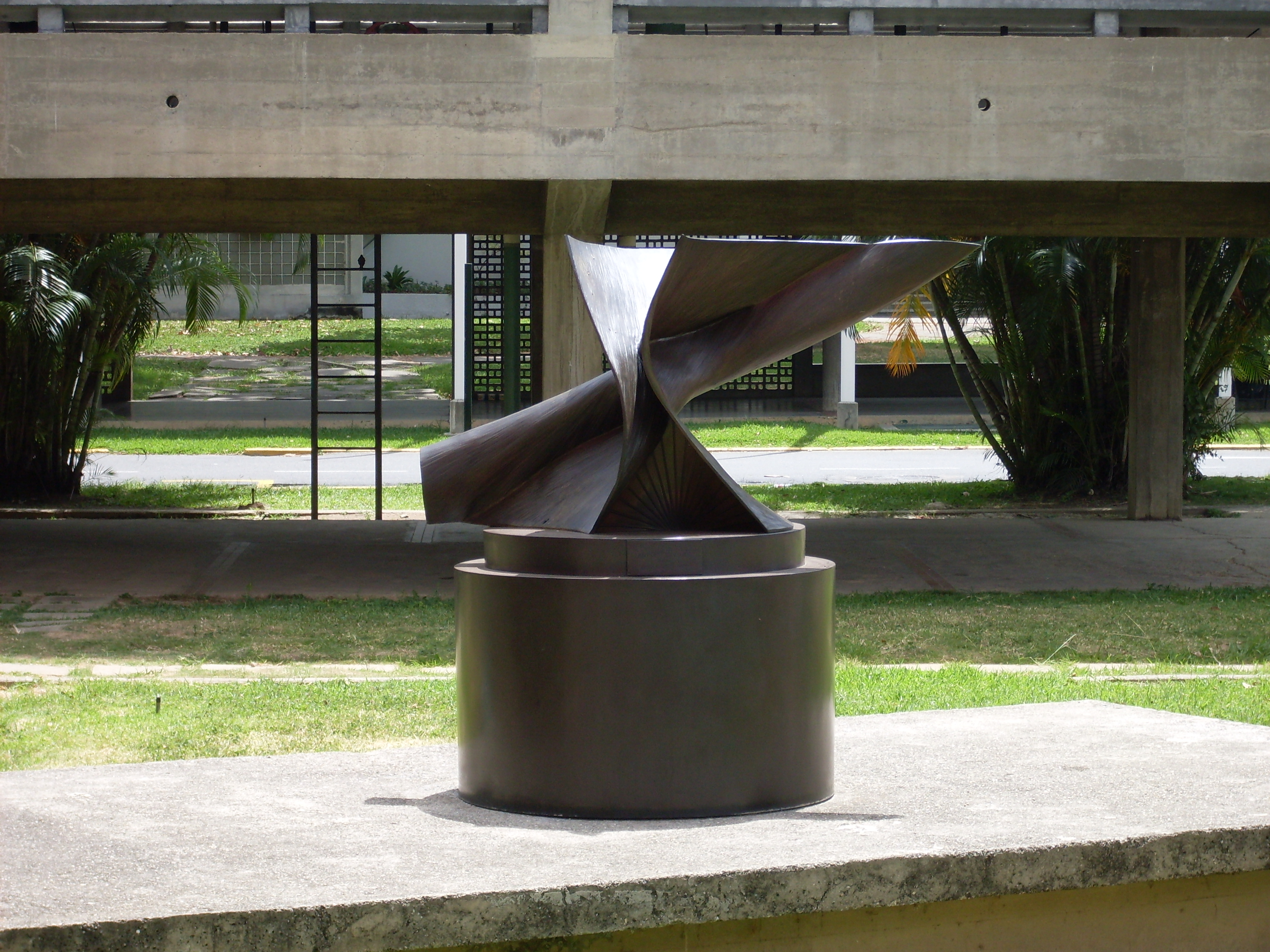
Projection dynamique au 30e degré (lit. "Dynamic projection at the 30th degree") by Antoine Pevsner, 1953

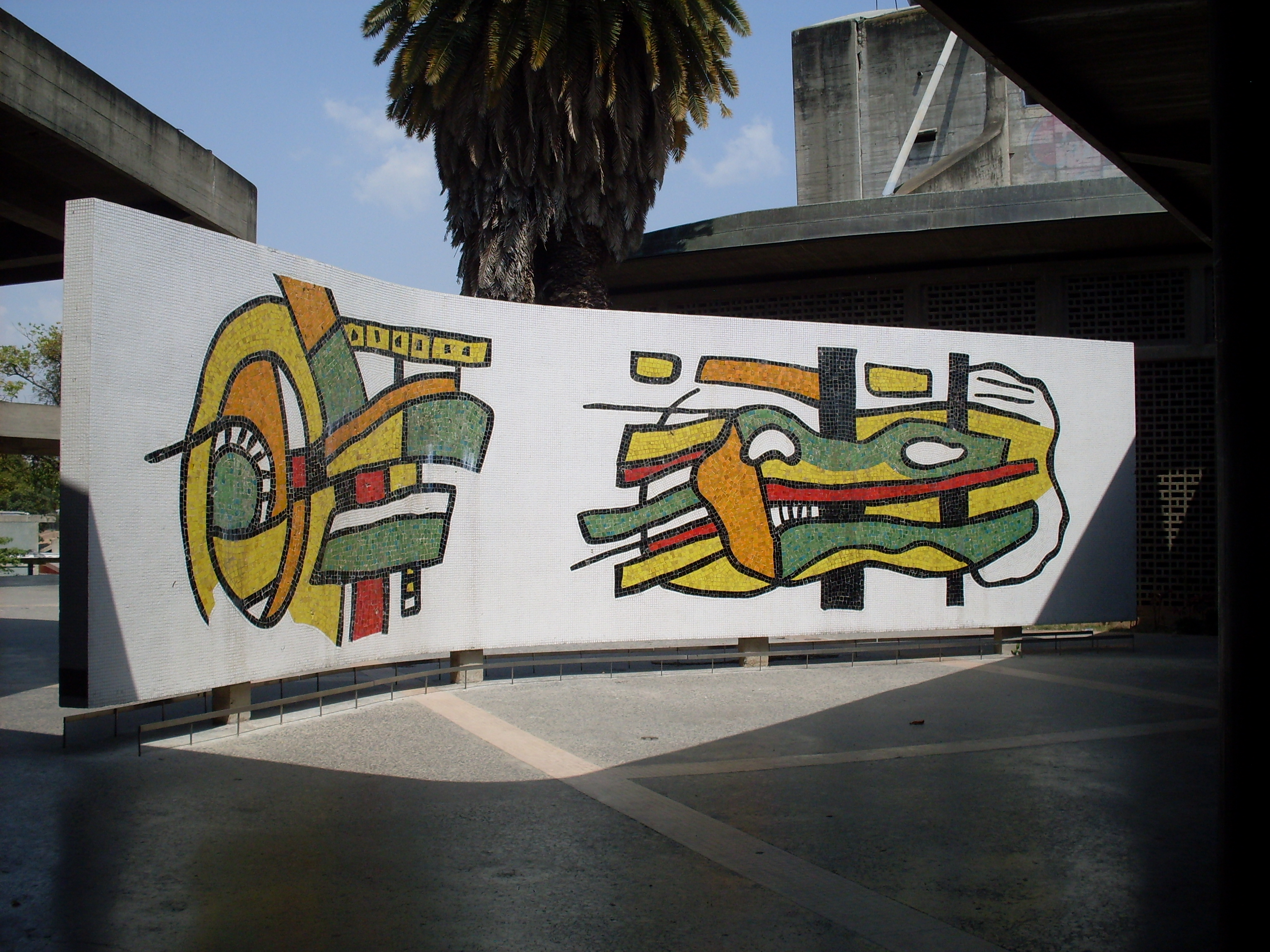
Bimural by Fernand Léger, 1954

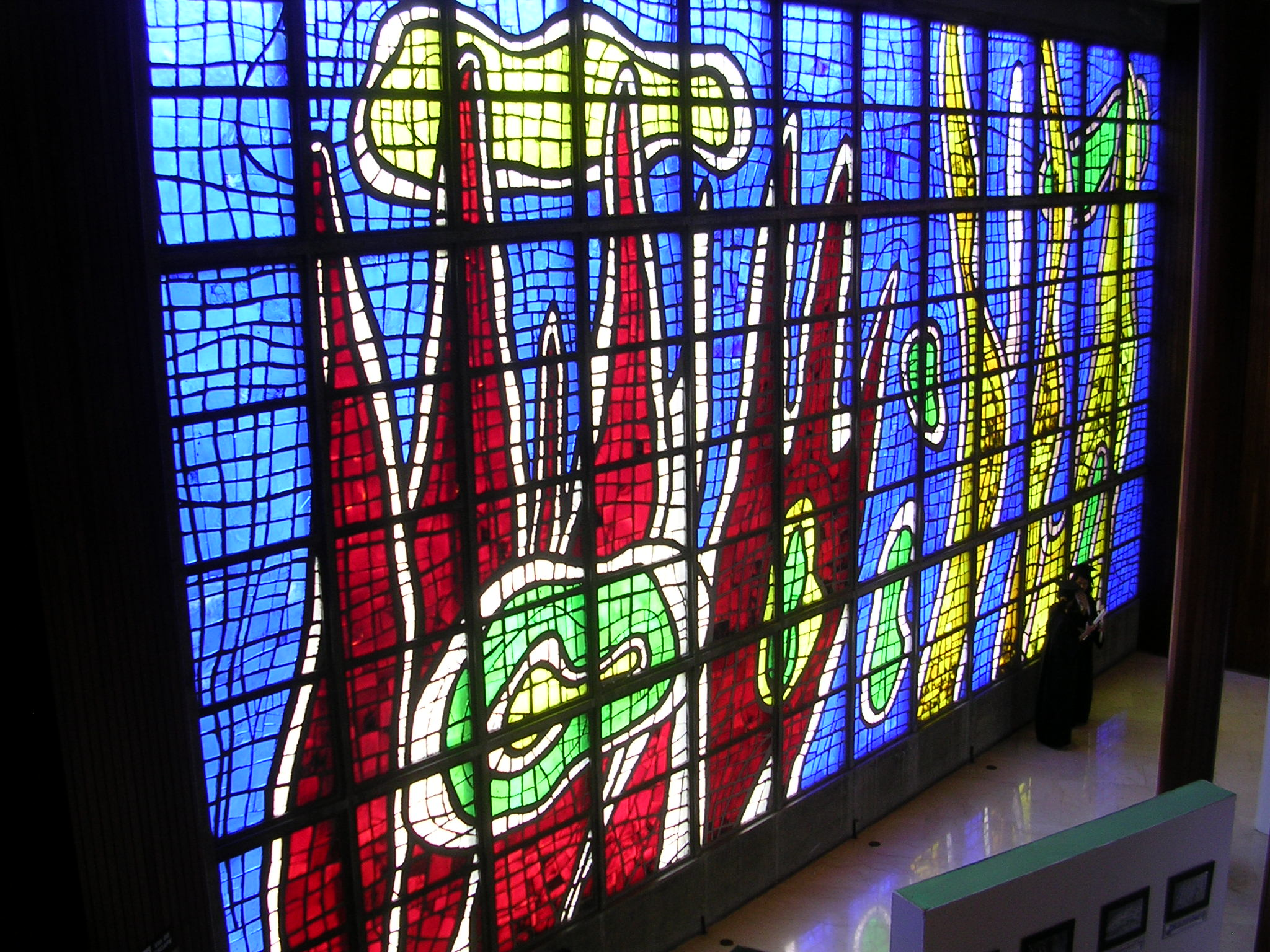
Stained-glass window by Fernand Léger, 1954

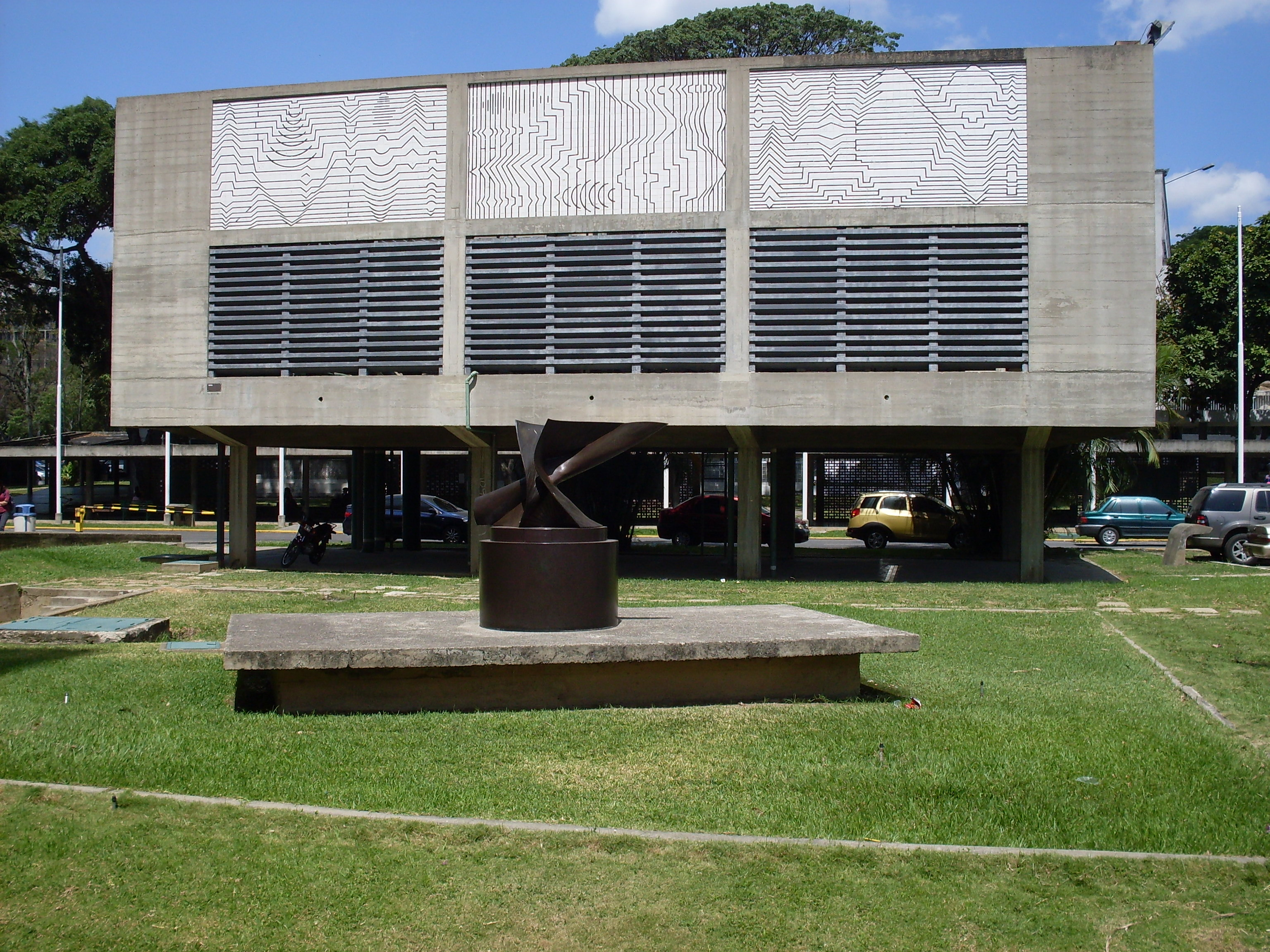
Sophia by Victor Vasarely, 1954

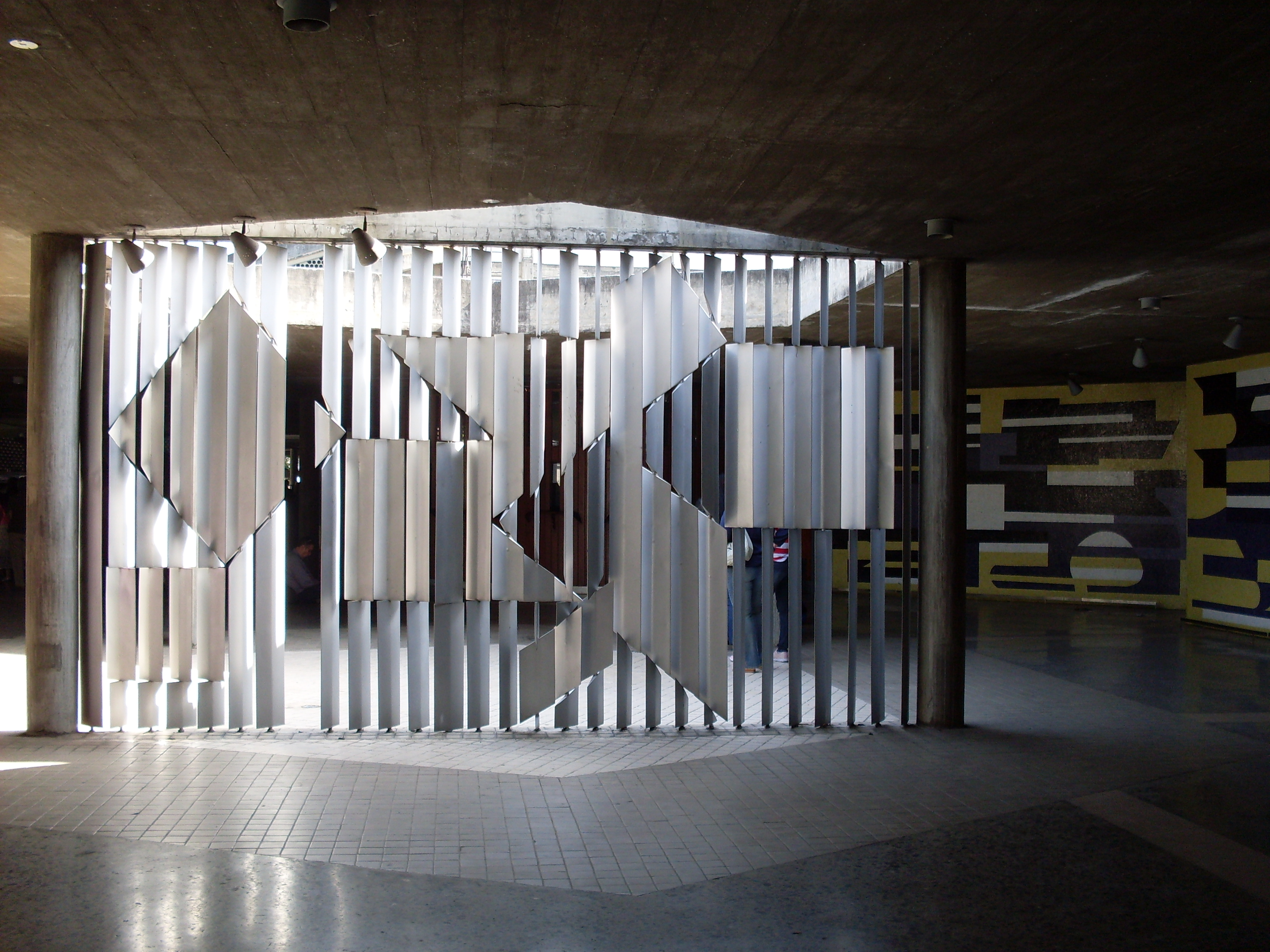
+ - (Positif-Negatif) by Victor Vasarely, 1954

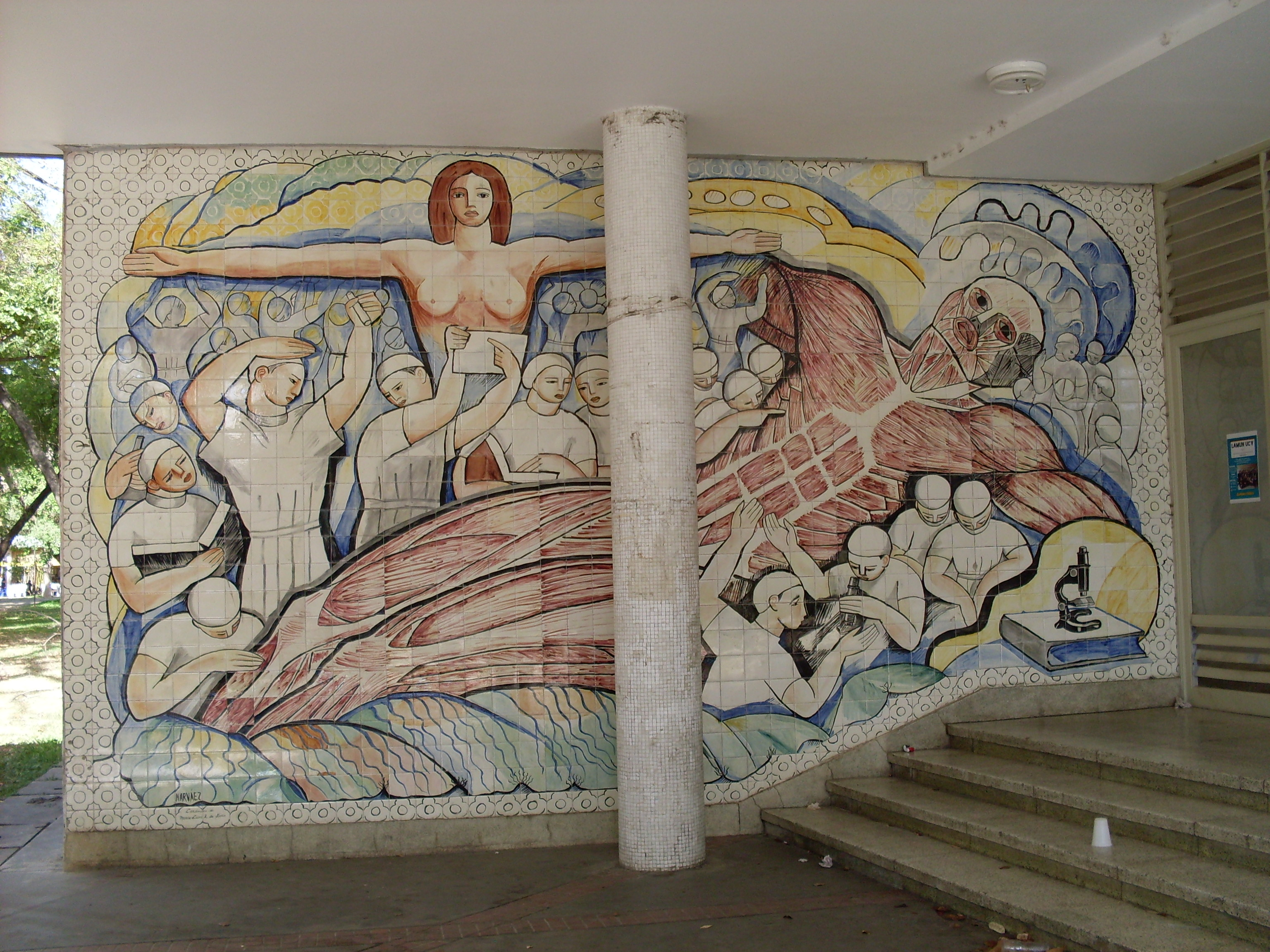
Mural by Francisco Narváez, 1951

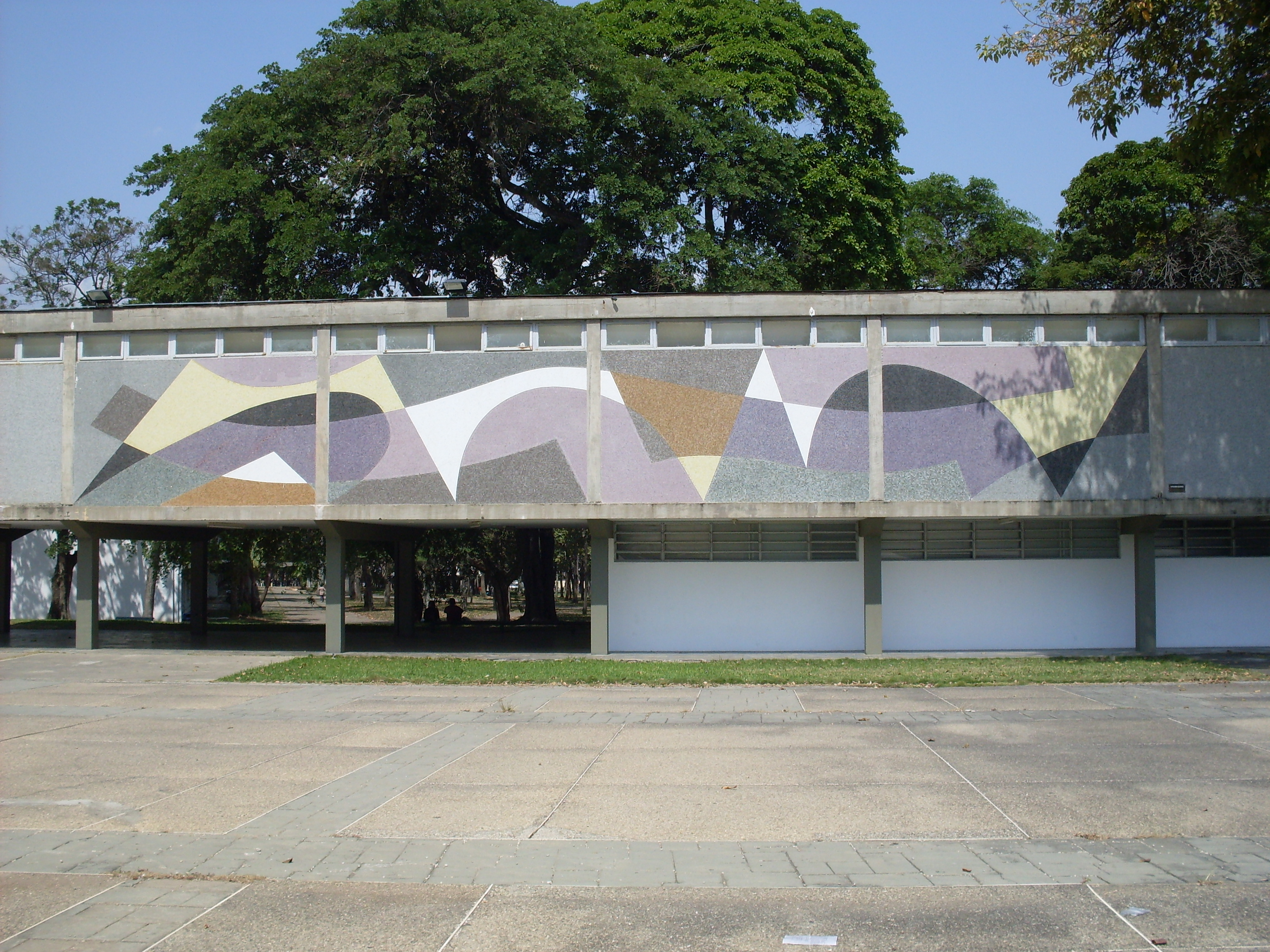
Mural by Armando Barrios, 1953

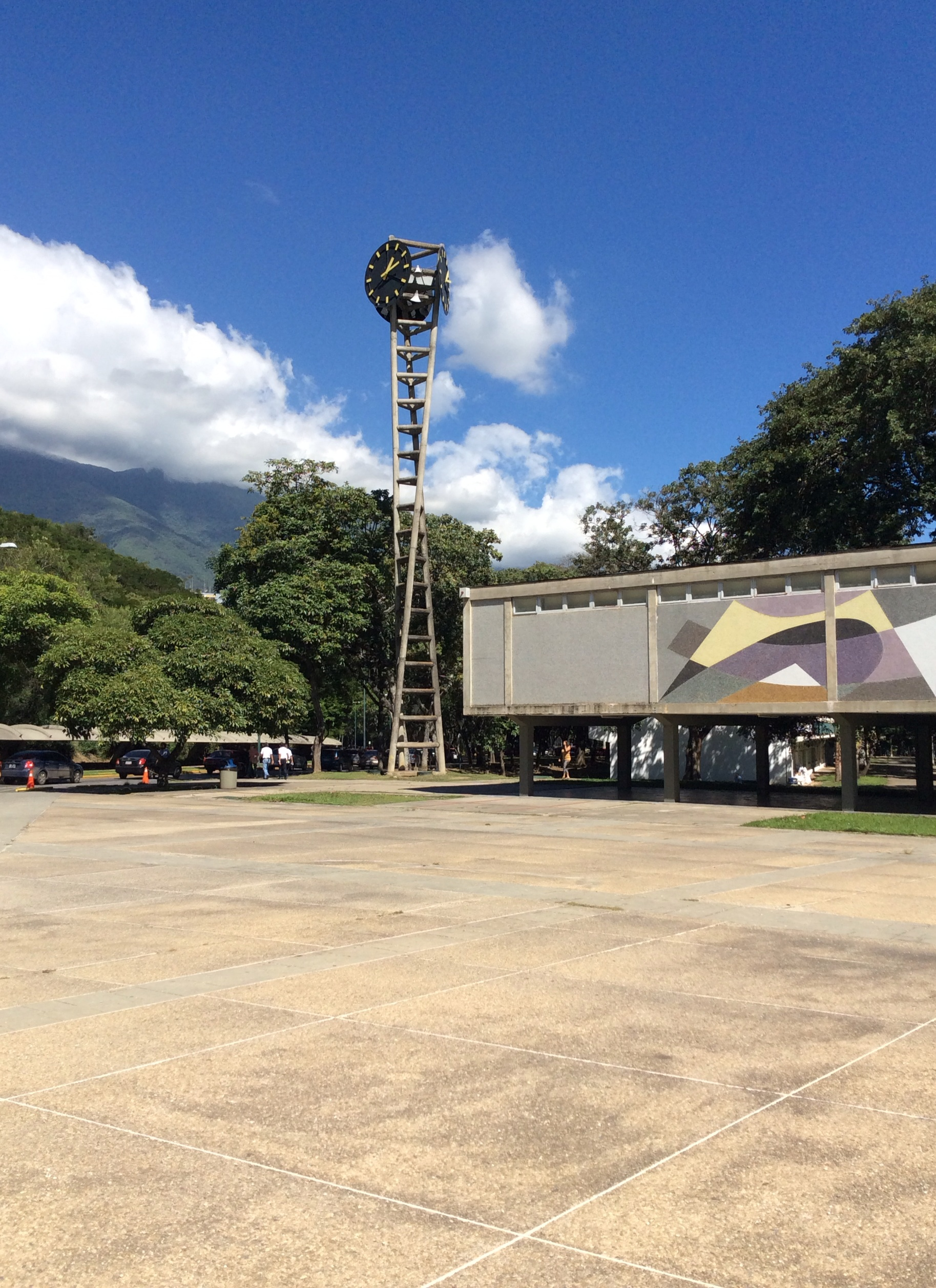
Clock Tower by Carlos Raúl Villanueva & Juan Otaola Paván, 1953

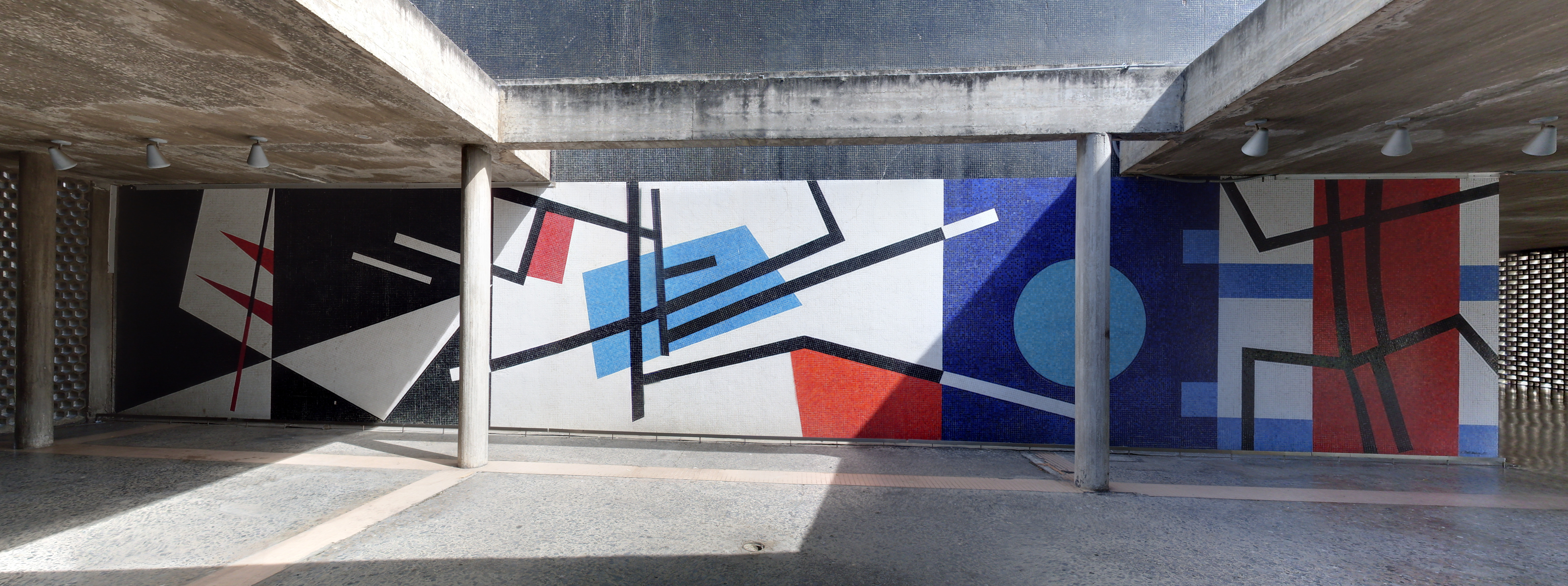
Mural by Mateo Manaure, 1954

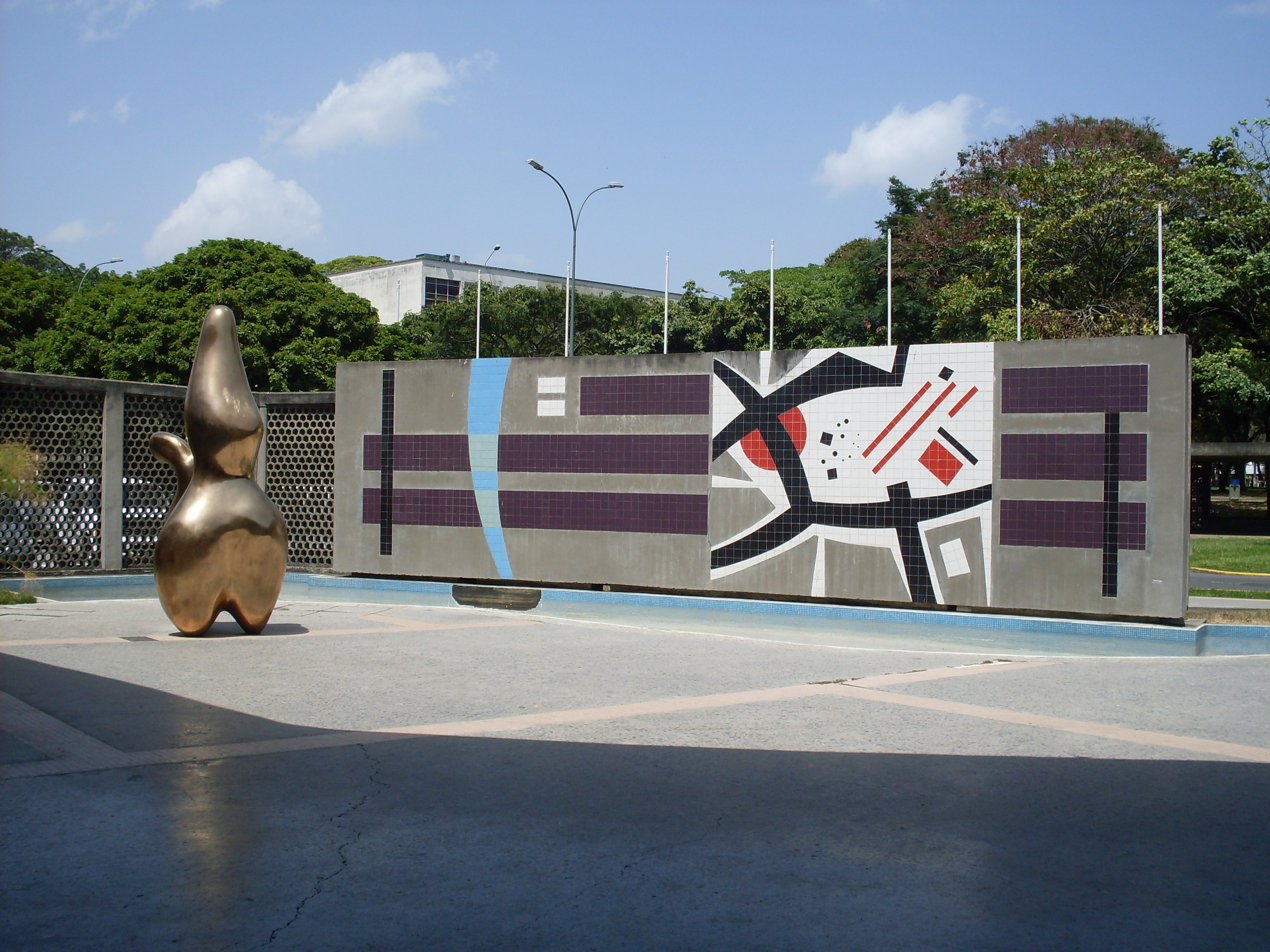
Bimural by Mateo Manaure, 1954

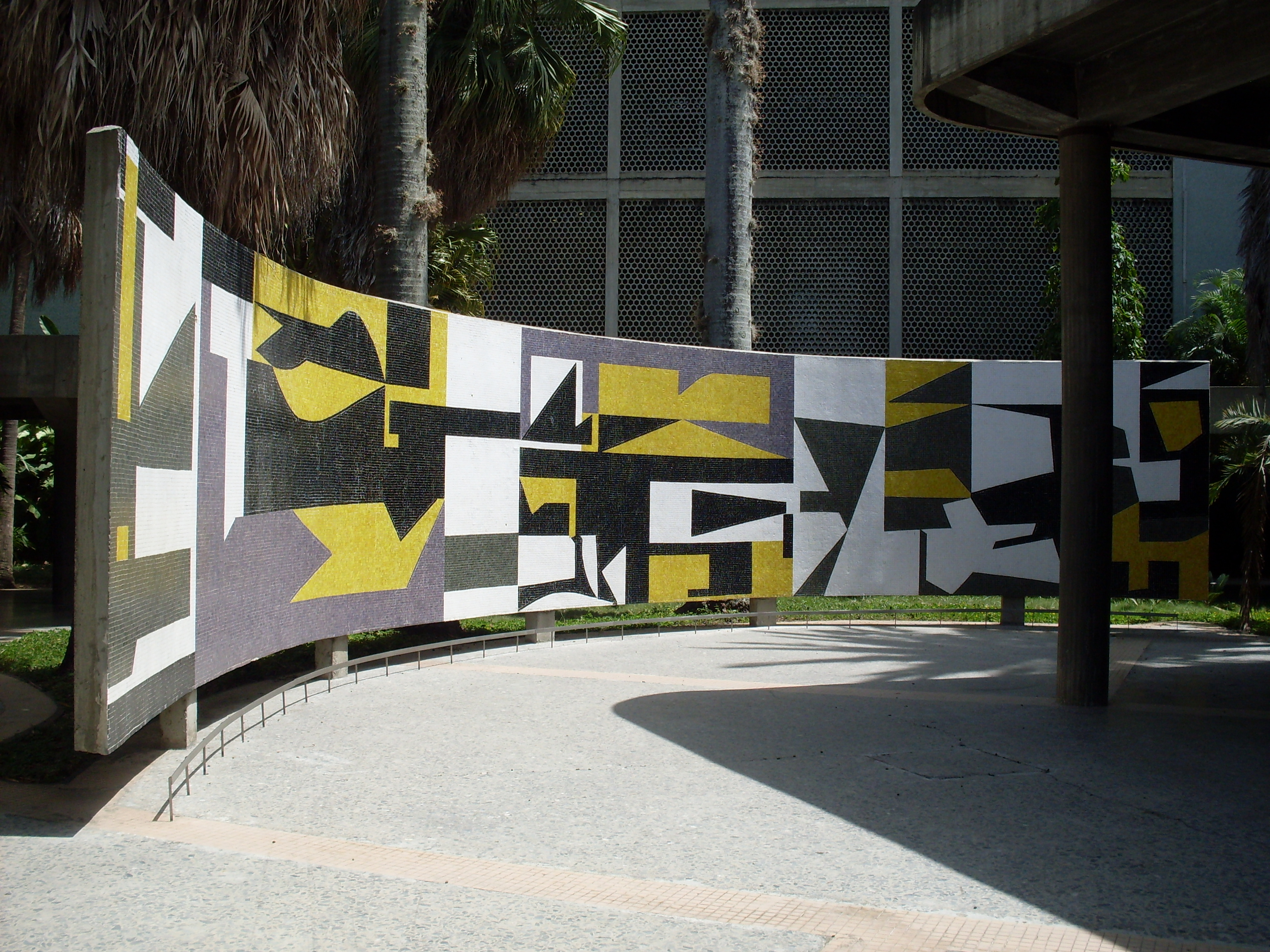
Curved mural by Pascual Navarro, 1954

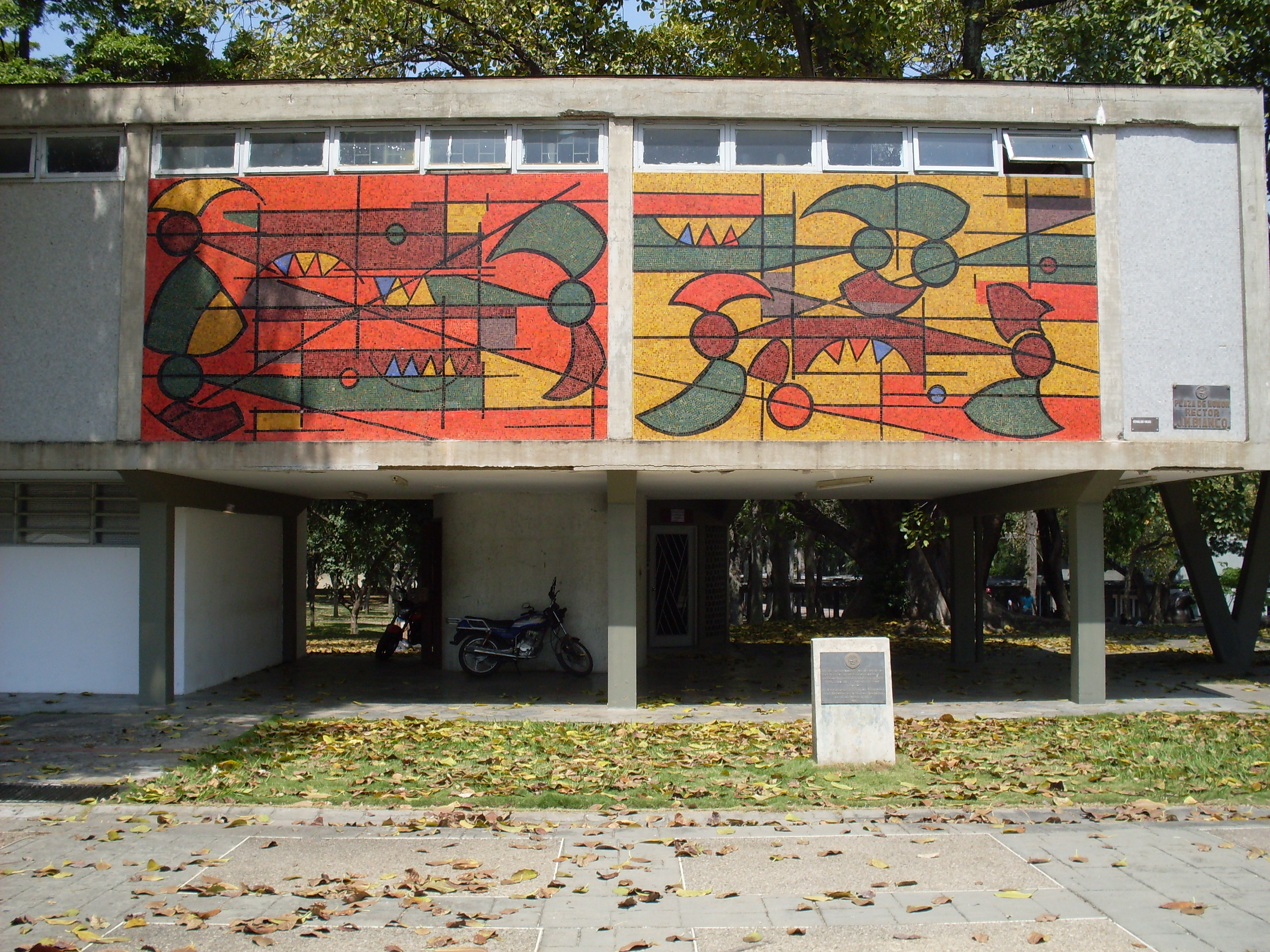
Composición Estática-Composición Dinámica by Oswaldo Vigas, 1954

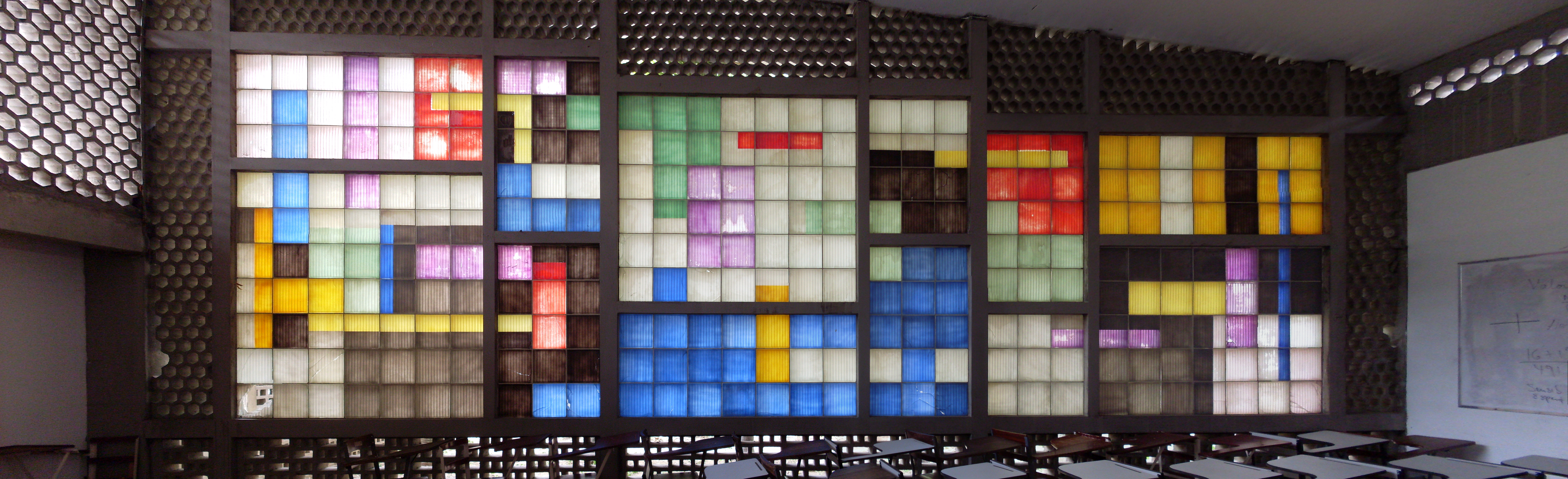
Stained-glass window by Braulio Salazar, 1956

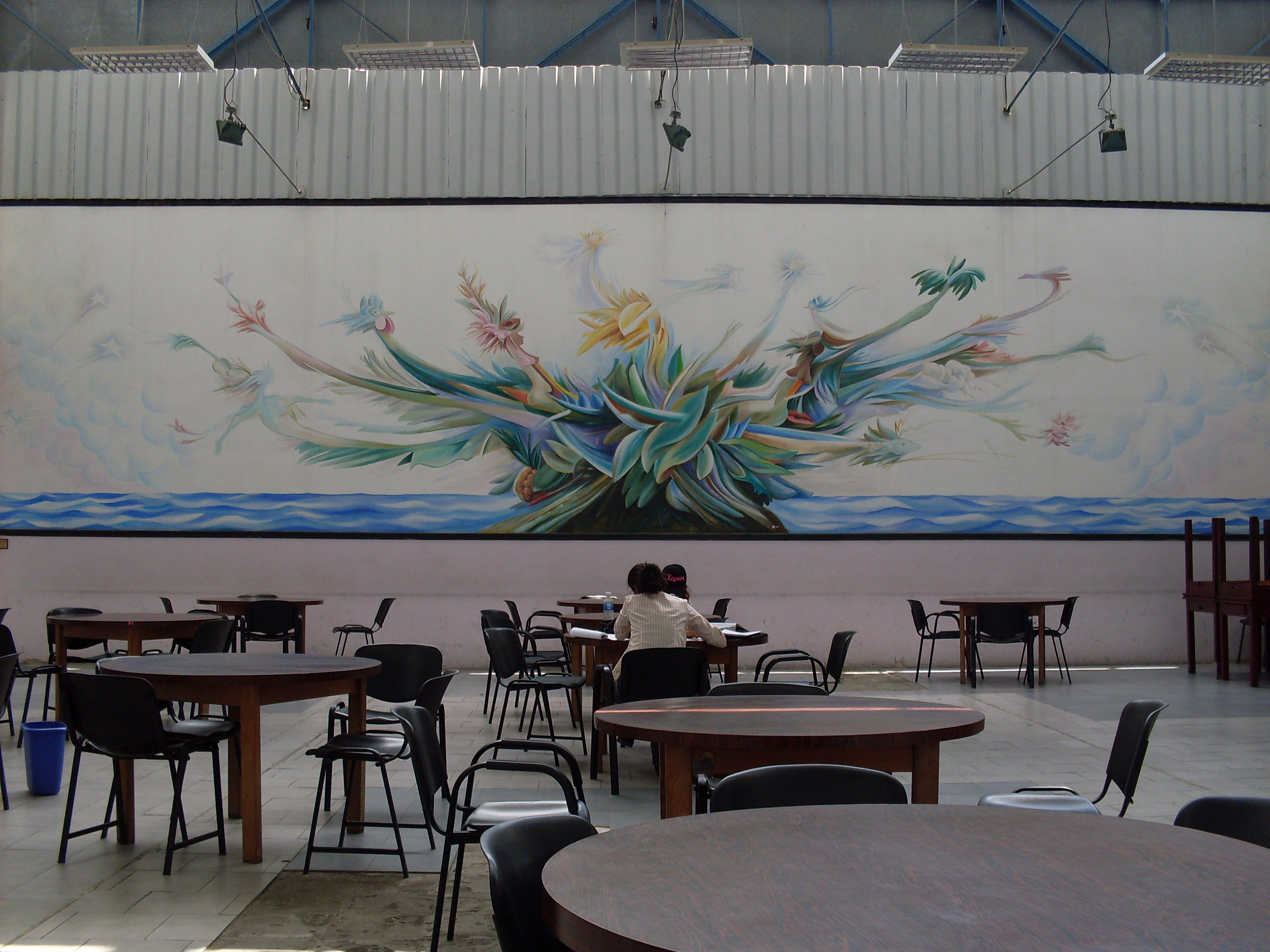
Triunfo del trópico by Pablo Toscano, 1998

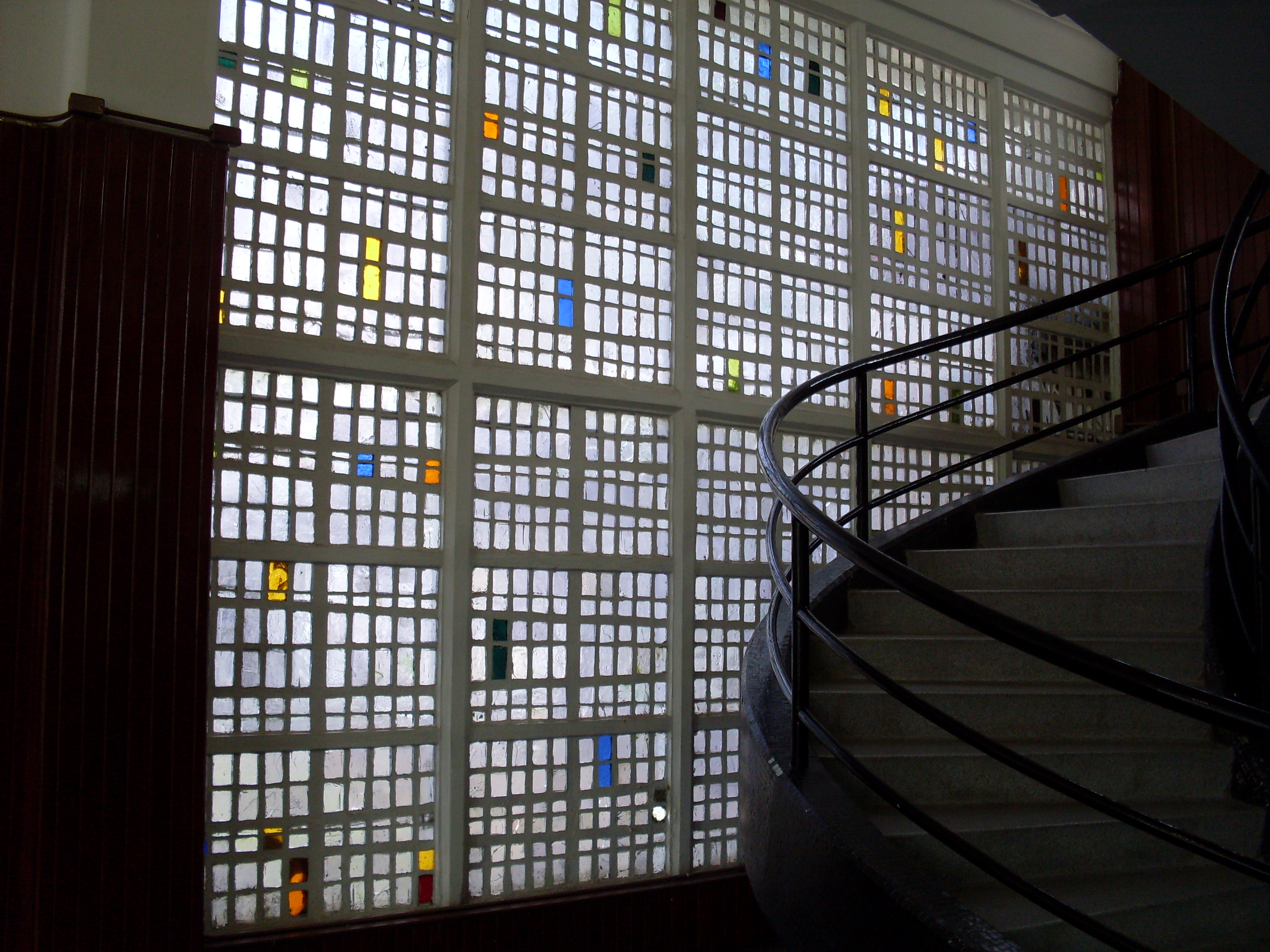
Stained-glass window by Alejandro Otero, 1954

== World Heritage Site ==
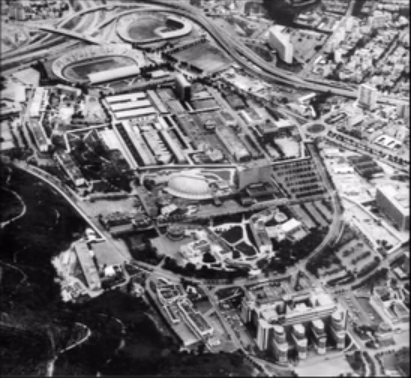
The central complex of the university

The campus was designated a World Heritage Site in 2000. It was designated under cultural criteria for being a masterpiece of architecture and urban planning on the part of Villanueva, being an outstanding example of practical and aesthetic architecture, and for being exemplary of early 20th Century movements art and architecture, and demonstrating their ideals. UNESCO describes it specifically as "an outstanding example of the Modern Movement in architecture" and adds that "[t]he university campus integrates the large number of buildings and functions into a clearly articulated ensemble, including masterpieces of modern architecture and visual arts, such as the Aula Magna with the "Clouds" of Alexander Calder, the Olympic Stadium, and the Covered Plaza." The site did not have an associated retrospective Statement of Outstanding Universal Value in 2000 when it was inscribed, with one drafted by the Venezuelan state approved in 2013.

Though acknowledging that the integrity of the site is maintained in the architectural principles of Villanueva and the overall spirit of the design, the WHS program has concerns that the reinforced concrete of the structures — something that identifies the campus with architectural advances of its time — has deteriorated in the years since construction; that being prone to social unrest could provoke damage to the site; that soil erosion poses a threat to the space; and that massive student expansion opens the campus up to more deterioration and destruction, as do works undertaken to partition and reassign spaces of the campus without consideration of the architecture the works can change design and significance of, deteriorating the combined ensemble of the entire campus and working against the spirit of Villanueva's project. However, UNESCO adds that no works have compromised the authenticity or the value of the campus.

There are bodies with the purpose of creating plans to protect the site, but UNESCO reports that these are disjointed and do not work together, advising that the Cultural Heritage Institute right down to COPRED — the university's Consejo de Preservación y Desarrollo (Council of Preservation and Development) — and the separate management interface of the Jardín Botánico, as well as the regional offices of Venezuela responsible for the area at different levels of government, need to coordinate. It was also recommended that a buffer zone be initiated to the south and west of the site to protect from urban developments threatening the site.
