= Cerecinos de Campos =

Coordinates: 41°54′N 5°29′W

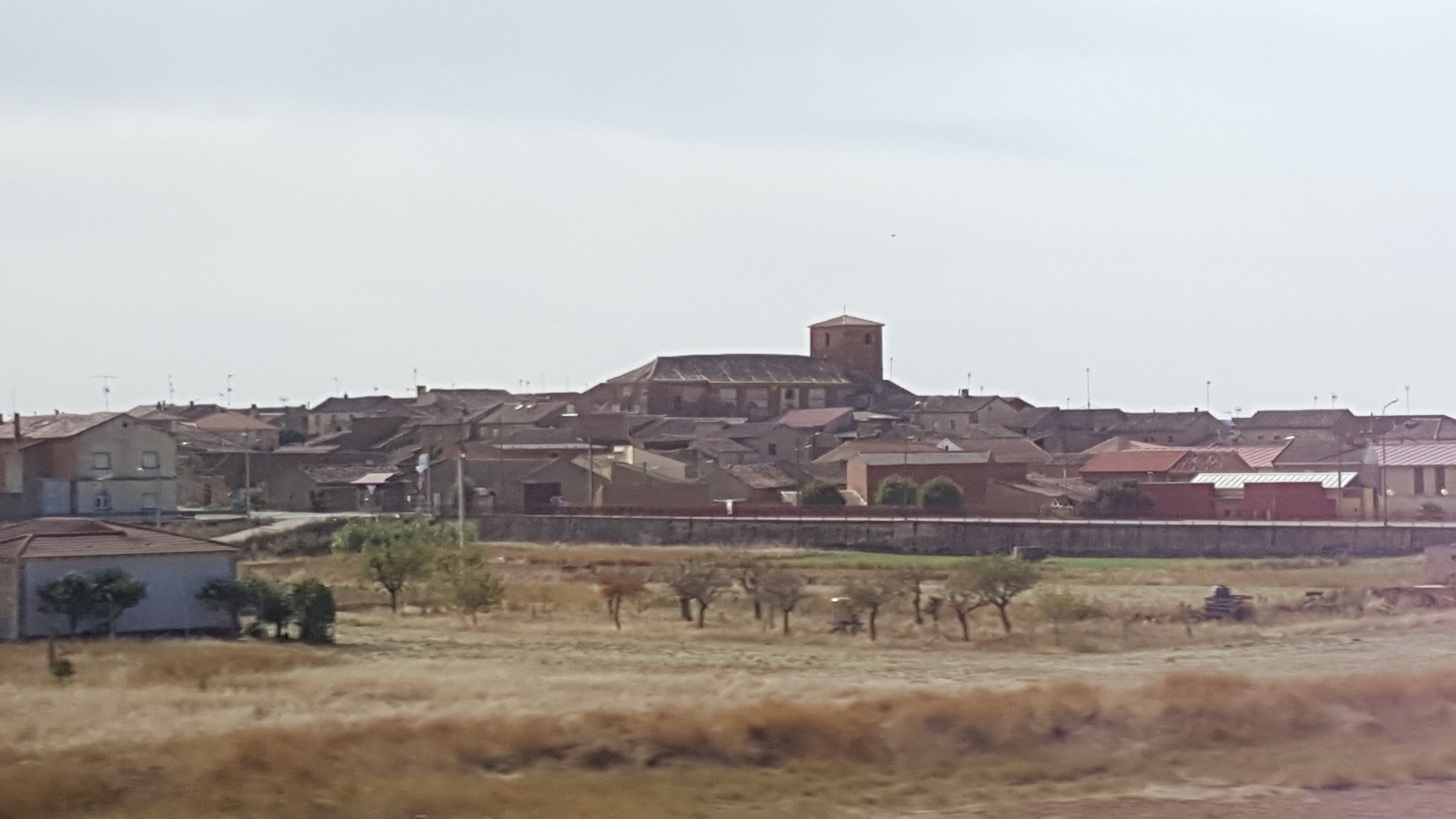

- Flag Coat of arms
- Interactive map of Cerecinos de Campos
- Country: Spain
- Autonomous community: Castile and León
- Province: Zamora
- Municipality: Cerecinos de Campos

Area
  - Total: 28 km^{2} (11 sq mi)

Population (2025-01-01)
  - Total: 231
  - Density: 8.2/km^{2} (21/sq mi)
- Time zone: UTC+1 (CET)
  - Summer (DST): UTC+2 (CEST)

Cerecinos de Campos is a municipality located in the province of Zamora, Castile and León, Spain. According to the 2009 census (INE), the municipality had a population of 368 inhabitants.
