= Flag of Falcón =

Venezuelan state flag

Flag of Falcón state

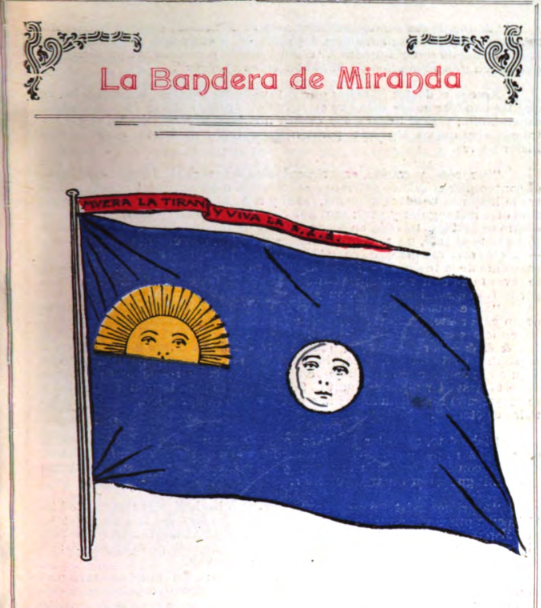
Reproduction of the facsimile image of Miranda's naval flag recovered by Sanchez in the Spanish archives, published in the Guayaquil magazine La Ilustración

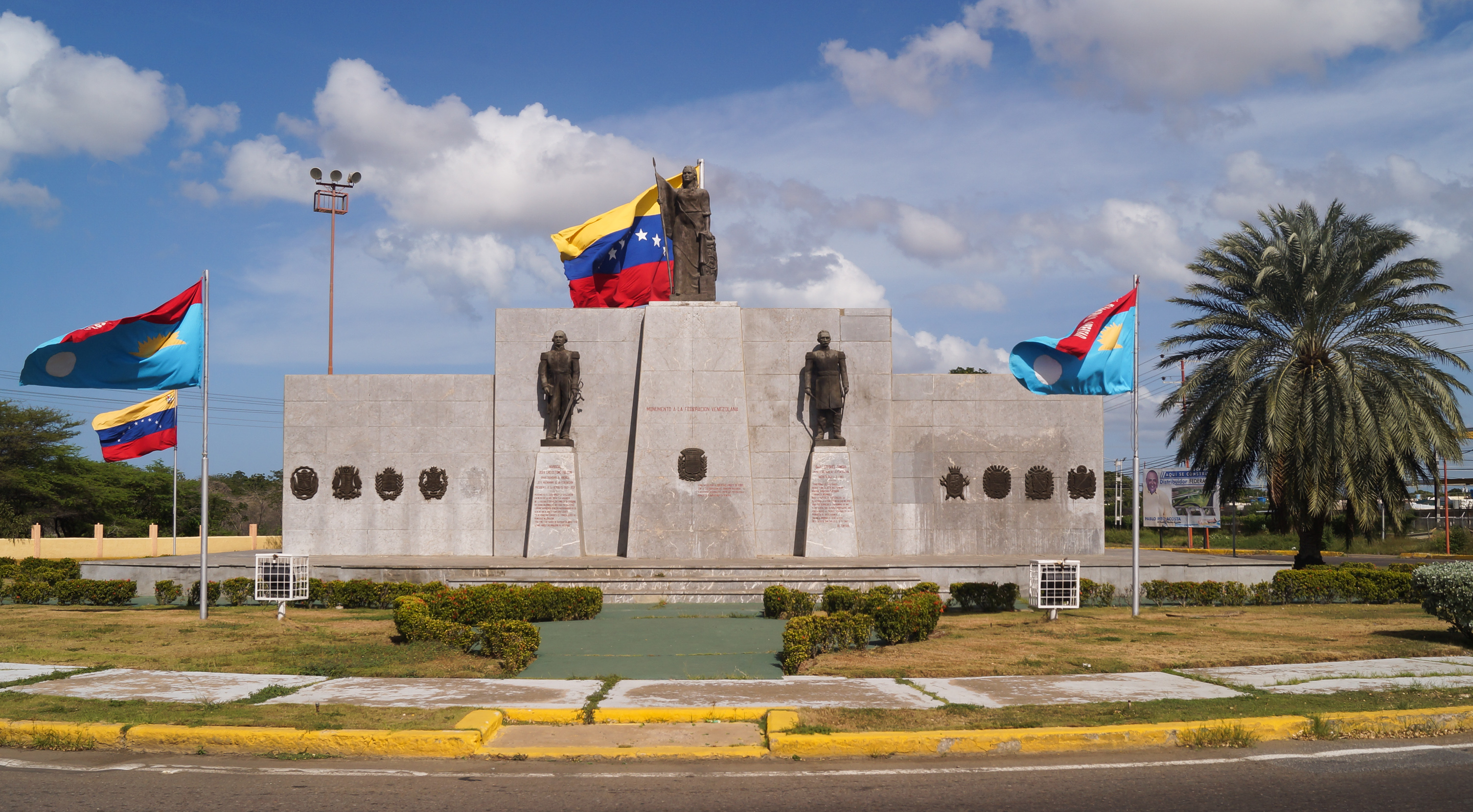
National and state flags hoisted at the entry of Monument to the Venezuelan Federation ('Paredón') in Coro

Flag of Falcón state, 1970–2006

The flag of Falcón state, one of the 23 states of Venezuela, depicts a sun and a moon and has a red ribbon on top, with the words 'MUERA LA TIRANIA VIVA LA LIBERTAD' ("Death to Tyranny, Long Live Liberty") in white letters.

== Symbolism ==
The flag was adopted (supplanting a previous tricolor) in 2006, in connection with the bicentennial celebrations of the landing of Francisco de Miranda at La Vela de Coro in 1806. On August 3, 2006, governor Jesús Montilla hoisted the new flag at the Monument to the Venezuelan Federation ('Paredón') in the state capital Coro. The unveiling followed the passage in the Falcón State Legislative Council of a legislation to change the state flag on August 1, 2006. The flag design is based on a naval flag used by Miranda on the voyage of his war ship Leander.

For a long time, the prevailing understanding in Venezuela was that Leander had carried the yellow-blue-red tricolour flag as its naval flag. This position had been corroborated from testimonies of participants in Miranda's 1806 mission. In the 1910s, Dr. Manuel Segundo Sánchez, director of the National Library of Caracas, challenged this notion, having uncovered correspondence at the General Archive of the Indies in Seville of the Spanish colonial authorities which included a facsimile drawing of a naval flag used by Miranda in 1806. It was a blue banner with a sun and a moon – in Sanchez's interpretation the blue colour would represent both sky and sea, whilst the rising sun would represent the rising American liberty and the full moon the declining Spanish empire. Above the flag there was a red pennant with the words 'MVERA LA TIRANIA Y VIVA LA &&&' – for Sanchez it is obvious that "&&&" would have represented the word 'libertad' ("Liberty").
