= Cinemateca Nacional de Venezuela =

Venezuelan public institution

- Type: Governmental
- Legal status: Foundation
- Purpose: Cinematheque, cinematography, museum
- Headquarters: Centro Simón Bolívar Towers
- Location: Caracas, Venezuela
- President: Vladimir Sosa Sarabia
- Affiliations: International Federation of Film Archives

The National Cinematheque of Venezuela (Spanish: Cinemateca Nacional de Venezuela) is a Venezuelan public institution founded on May 4, 1966, by Margot Benacerraf and since then is dedicated to archiving, preserving and presenting film archives in Venezuela. It holds more than 85,000 films, 30,000 photographs, 420 movie posters, 400 scripts and 30,000 film books and magazines.

Its headquarters are at Centro Simón Bolívar Towers.

== History ==
In 1956, Margot Benacerraf was commissioned by Henry Langlois to represent the International Federation of Film Archives in Venezuela and to study the possibility of creating a film archive in Caracas. In 1959, Inocente Palacios appointed Benacerraf director of the Cinemateca Nacional, which would form part of the planned Museum of Modern Art, although this project did not come to fruition. In parallel, Antonio Pasquali, Rodolfo Izaguirre, Sergio Baroni and Lorenzo Batallán presented to Francisco De Venanzi, rector of the Central University of Venezuela, a project for the creation of a Cinemateca Nacional, which would operate in the Central Library of the University.

In 1964, under the presidency of Rómulo Betancourt, the National Institute of Culture and Fine Arts (INCIBA) was created, and Benacerraf was appointed director of the Division of Studies and Programs. There, in May 1965, Benacerraf proposed the Cinemateca.

Finally, the Cinemateca was founded on May 4, 1966 with the aim of archiving, restoring and presenting national and foreign cinema, and Benacerraf was appointed as its president.

Since 2005, the Cinemateca expands throughout Venezuela, by creating 12 different movie theaters all around the country.

== Theaters ==
The National Cinematheque of Venezuela has two movie theaters in Caracas: one at the Museum of Fine Arts and the other at the Rómulo Gallegos Center for Latin American Studies (CELARG), located in Altamira.

It also has movie theaters in the following cities in Venezuela: Barcelona, Barquisimeto, Calabozo, Cumaná, Guanare, Macuto, Maracay, Maracaibo, Pampatar, Puerto Ayacucho, San Carlos, San Felipe, San Fernando de Apure, Valera and San Cristóbal.

== Film Archive ==
Since its creation National Cinematheque of Venezuela manages the Film Archive, which has 85,000 films, 30,180 photographs and 420 movie posters. Some of the early and classic Venezuelan films found in this archive are Don Leandro el Inefable (1919) by Lucas Manzano, La venus de nácar (1932) by Efraín Gómez, Reverón (1938) by Edgar J. Anzola, La danza de los esqueletos (1934), the first Venezuelan animated short film, produced at the National Laboratories, directed by Herbert Weisz and with soundtrack by Efraín Gómez, and Taboga y hacia El Calvario (1938) by Rafael Rivero, La escalinata (1950) by César Enríquez.

== Presidents ==
- Margot Benacerraf, 1966-1968
- Rodolfo Izaguirre, 1968-1988
- Carmen Luisa Cisneros, 1988
- Ricardo Tirado, 1988-1991
- Oscar Lucien, 1991-1994
- Fernando Rodríguez, 1994-1999
- Jacobo Penzo, 1999-2002
- Xavier Sarabia, 2005-2009
- Gustavo Michelena, 2009-2013
- Xavier Sarabia, 2013-2016
- Blanca Rey, 2016-2017
- William Rafael Santana Cedeño, 2017-2020
- Vladimir Sosa Sarabia, 2020-actualidad

== See also ==
- List of archives in Venezuela
- List of libraries in Venezuela
