= Mérida Bolivarian Library =

Biblioteca Bolivariana de Mérida
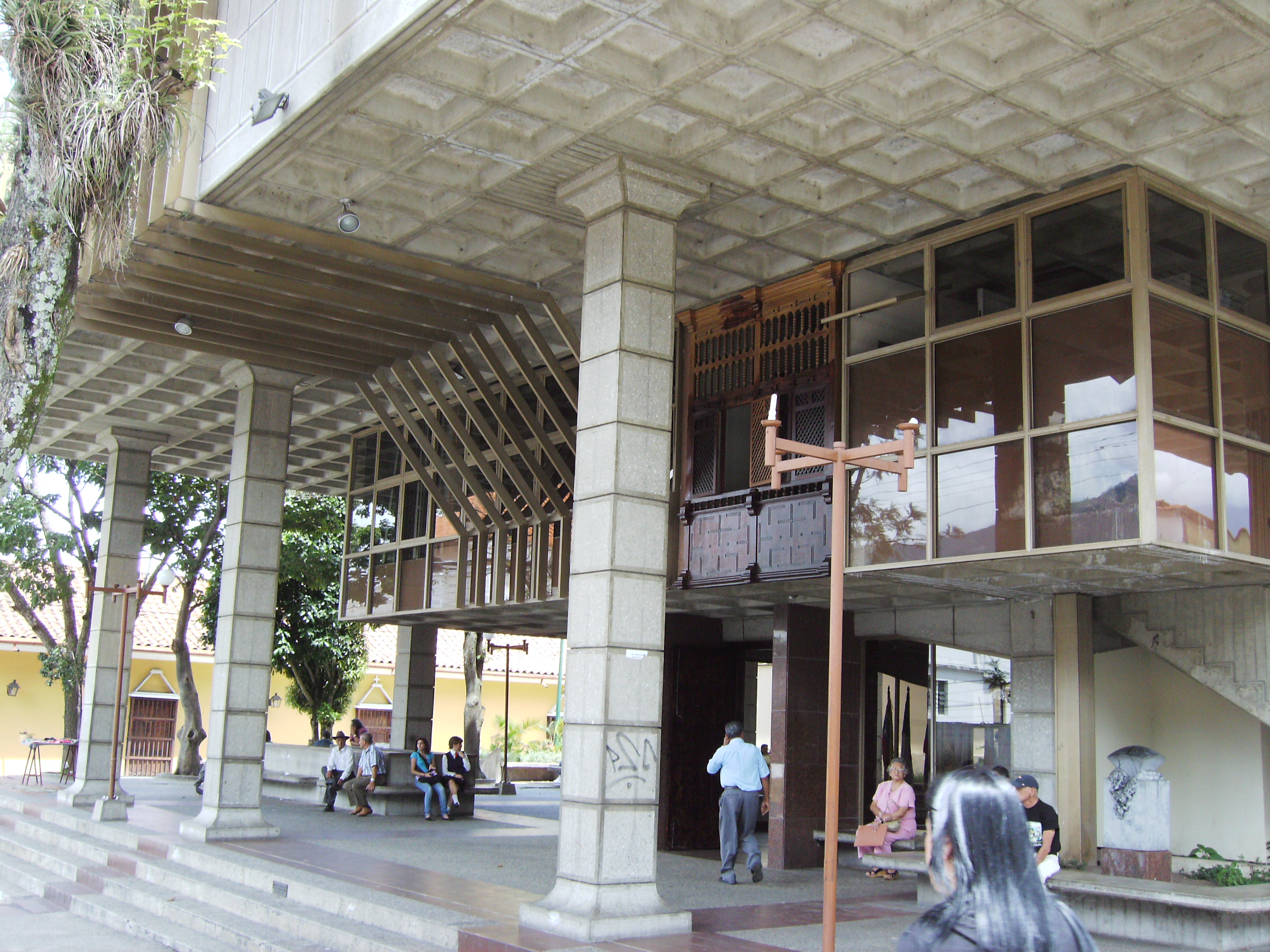
- external view of the Bolivarian Library
- Location: Mérida, Venezuela
- Established: 1983

The Bolivarian Library (Spanish: Biblioteca Bolivariana de Mérida) is a multipurpose building located in Mérida, Venezuela, which serves as a reading room, exhibition hall, museum and meeting place.

The Headquarters building is a Modernist work of architecture in the heart of the colonial city, has a number of areas, in honor of the countries liberated by Simón Bolívar where located: reading room, computer room, exhibition and museum, while at exterior, or the street, is preceded by a small square, often used as a commercial area by local craftsmen.

== History ==
The library was opened in honor of the bicentennial of the birth of the "Libertador" Simón Bolívar in 1983. On its floor is home to several works related Bolívar, and various objects related to the colonial period and early years of independence. The building was built during the rule of former President Luis Herrera Campins, be that the work already completed.

The building occupies the site of what was once the Escuela Picón, the city of Mérida, who led an outstanding job for the collection of important goods such as books, historical documents, magazines and newspapers as the basis for research and entertainment of the merideños.

== See also ==
- List of libraries in Venezuela
