= National Archives of Venezuela =

Coordinates: 10.5130°N 66.9118°W

- Archivo General de la Nación
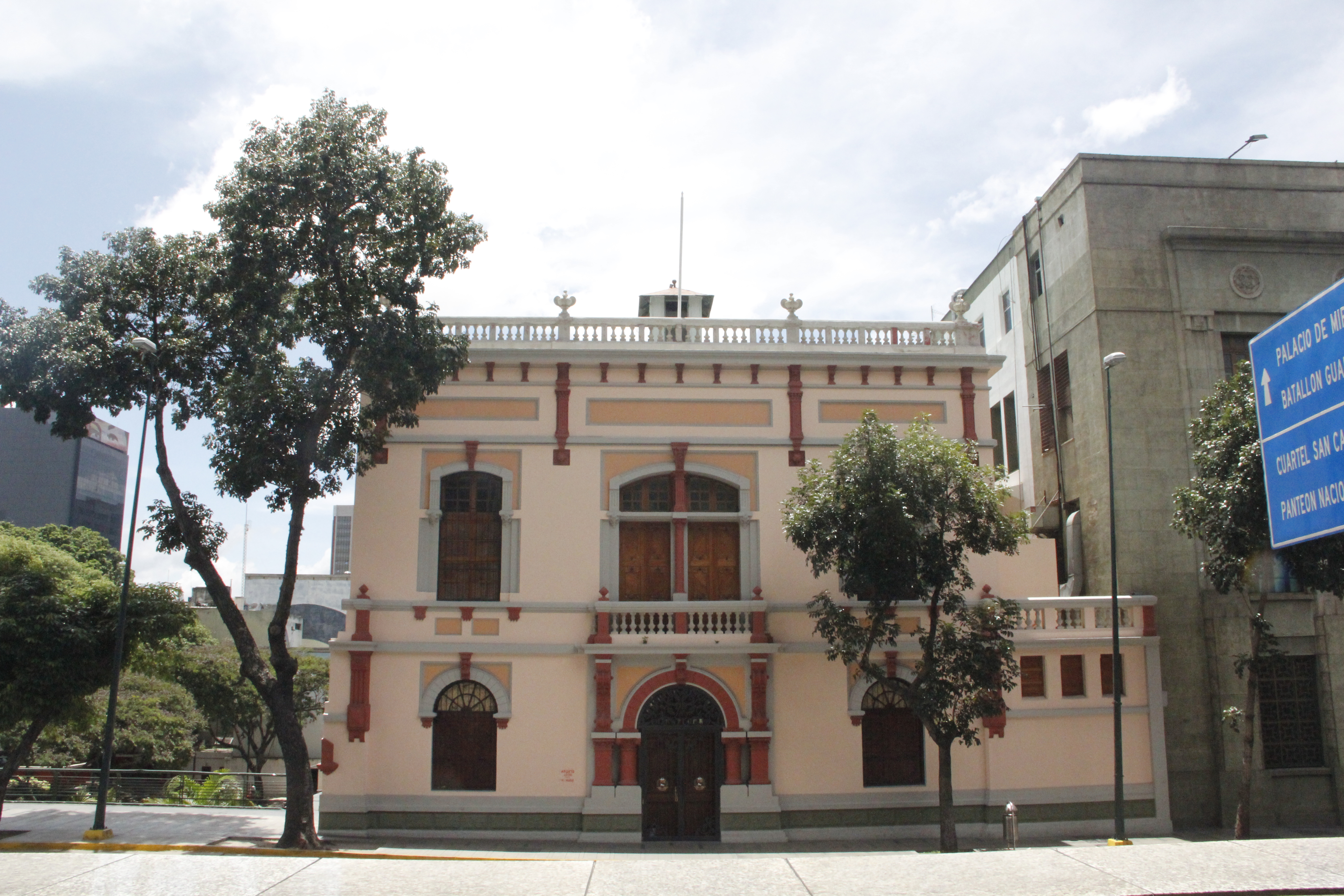
- Archives building

National archives overview
- Formed: 1836; 190 years ago
- Headquarters: Altagracia, Libertador, Caracas
- Parent department: Ministry of Culture

The National Archives of Venezuela are in Caracas.

== Directors ==
- Carlos Aristimuño Coll, 1912-1913
- Laureano Vallenilla Lanz, 1913-1915
- Isaac Capriles, 1915-1916
- Gustavo Terreno Atienza, 1916-1918
- Antonio José Pacheco, 1918-1919
- Federico Gabaldón, 1919-1921
- Vicente Dávila, 1921-1934
- Eloy González, 1934-1937
- Augusto Mijares, 1937-1938
- Luis Beltrán Guerrero, 1938
- Eduardo Picón Lares, 1938-1940
- Mariano Picón Salas, 1940-1941
- Mario Briceño Iragorry, 1941-1943
- Luis Yepez, 1943-1944
- J.A. García Ledezma, 1944-1945
- Rafael Yepez Trujillo, 1945
- Ambrosio Perera, 1945-1946
- Mario Briceño Perozo, 1959-1995
- Héctor García Chuecos, 1946-1959
- Guillermo Briceño Porras, 1995-2000
- Vinicio Romero Martínez, 2000-2002
- Manuel Carrero, 2003-2005
- Carmen Alida Soto, 2007-2010
- Luis Felipe Pellicer 2010-2015,
- Oscar León, 2015
- Fabricio Vivas Ramírez, 2016–2017

== See also ==
- List of national archives
- List of archives in Venezuela
