= List of archives in Venezuela =

This is list of archives in Venezuela.

== Archives in Venezuela ==
- Archivo General de la Nación de Venezuela
- Archivo General del Estado de Lara
- Archivo General del Estado de Mérida
- Archivo General del Estado de Táchira
- Archivo Histórico del Estado Trujillo
- Cinemateca Nacional de Venezuela

== See also ==
- List of archives
- List of libraries in Venezuela
- List of museums in Venezuela
- Culture of Venezuela
- Portal de Archivos Españoles (federated search of archives in Spain)
