= Monument to the Venezuelan Federation =

1969 work by Santiago Poletto in Coro

Coordinates: 11°25′27″N 69°38′42″W

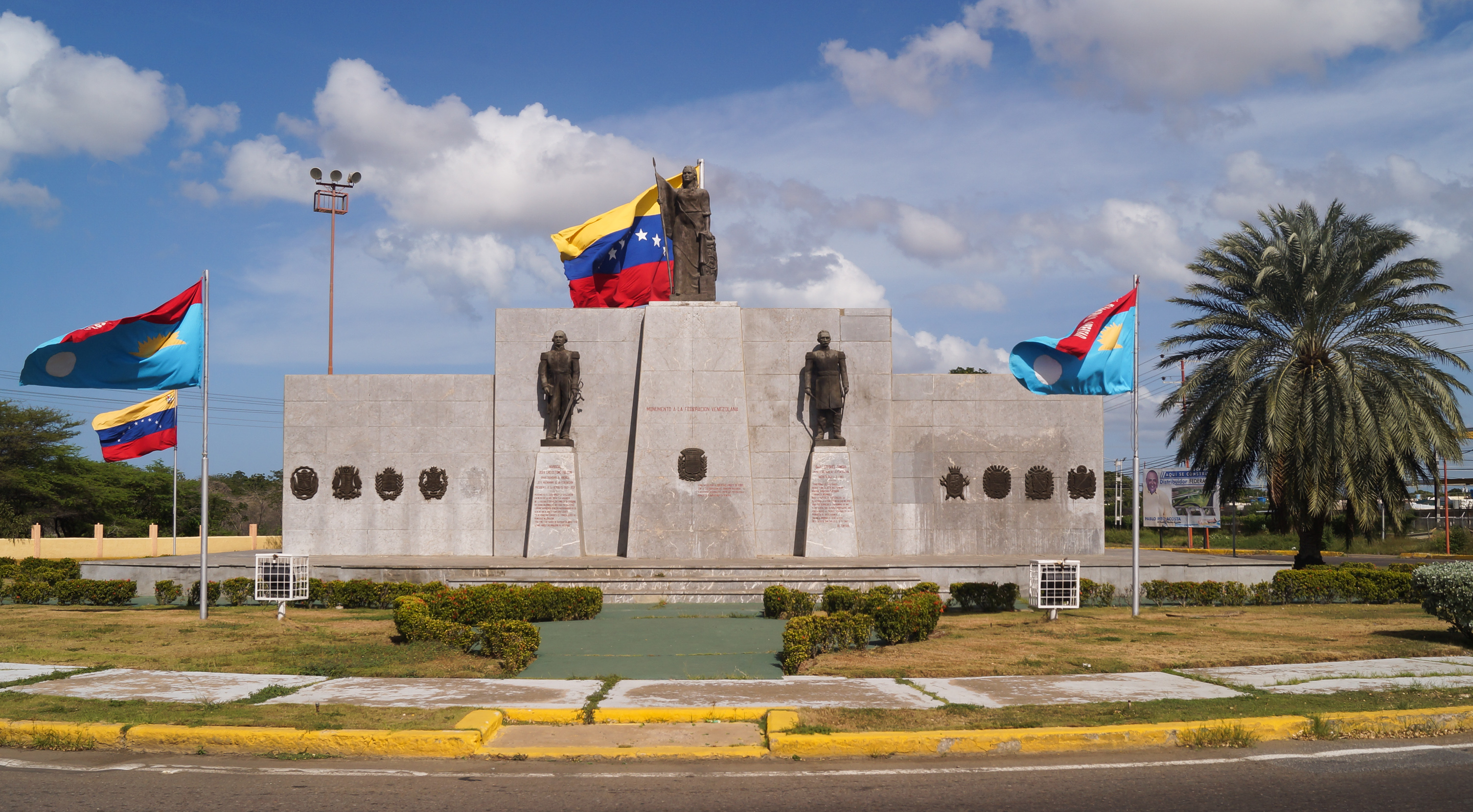
Monument to the Venezuelan Federation, Coro

The Monument to the Venezuelan Federation (Spanish: Monumento a la Federación Venezolana) is a monument in the Venezuelan city of Coro. It is located on Avenida Independencia, at the north-eastern entrance to the city. Known locally as el Paredón, the Monument was erected under the tenure of Pedro Luis Bracho Navarrete as the governor of Falcón state and was inaugurated on 20 February 1969. Whilst the government provided funds for the Monument, the Society of Friends of Coro were charged with the execution of the works. The sculptor of the monument was Santiago Poletto.

Surrounded by flagpoles, the monument is approximately 7 metres (23 ft) high and 21 metres (69 ft) wide and comprises a concrete structure covered with marble slabs. There is a main wall and three pedestals, each with a statue. The leftward statue depicts general Ezequiel Zamora, holding a sword and a sheath. The centre statue depicts a woman holding a shield and a banner (this statue has often been erroneously attributed to Josefa Camejo). The rightward statue depicts marshal Juan Crisóstomo Falcón, holding a book and a sword. The wall has 21 bronze shields, representing the 21 states of Venezuela existing at the time of the construction of the Monument. On the back of the Monument there is a cannon. Between 2012 and 2018, the Monument suffered damages, as bronze shields and letters were broken off by thieves to sell as scrap metal. Reportedly 10 out of the 21 shields had been removed. The removal of shields also damaged several of the marble slabs.
