= National Library of Venezuela =

Deposit library in Caracas, Venezuela

Coordinates: 10.5120°N 66.9124°W

Biblioteca Nacional de Venezuela National Library of Venezuela
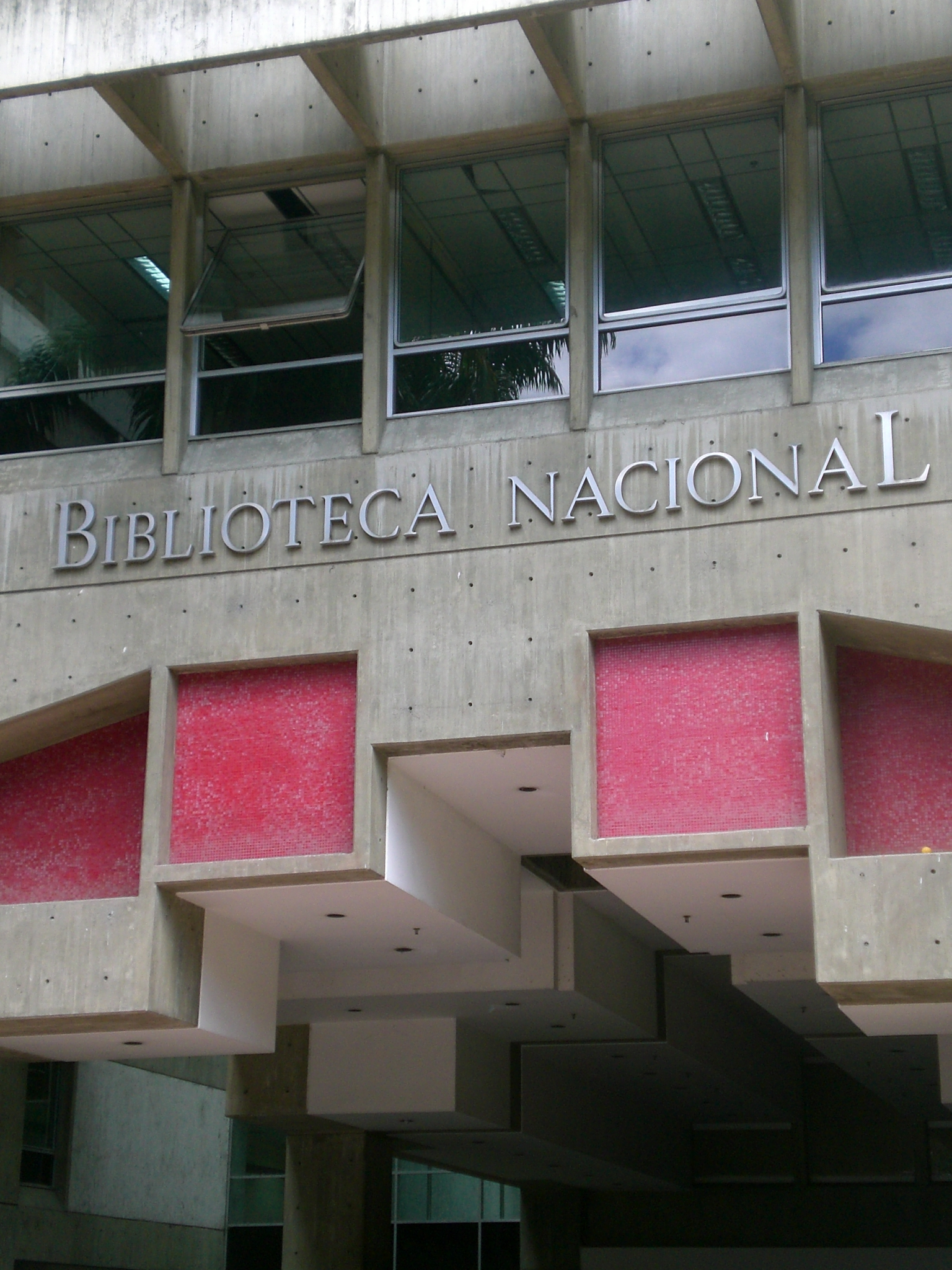
- Location: Caracas, Venezuela
- Established: 1833
- Branches: 685

Collection
- Size: 7,131,660 Books

Other information
- Director: Ignacio Barreto
- Website: http://www.bnv.gob.ve/

The Biblioteca Nacional de Venezuela (in English: National Library of Venezuela), located in Caracas, is the legal deposit and copyright for Venezuela. It was established on July 13, 1833, by decree of General José Antonio Páez. Diego Bautista Urbaneja, a Minister of Foreign Affairs, was designated as the first director.

The current headquarters of the library was designed by architect Tomás Sanabria from 1981 to 1989 in the style of Brutalist architecture, featuring a range of design elements and distinctive construction techniques.

The library contains several special collections:

- Automated Catalog
- Orientation and Reference
- CEDINBI (Library Information and Documentation Center)
- General Bibliographic Collection (CBG)
- Hemerographic Collection (CH)
- Collection of Official Publications (CPO)
- Old Documentary Collection (CDA)
- Arcaya Collection (CA)
- Sound and Cinema Collection and Flat Works Collection (CSCCOP).

According to their website, "The institution aspires to be an active organization in the generation of knowledge through the publication of various titles, printed or virtual, specialized or of collective interest, which are a contribution to the formation of a citizenry committed to building a better society."

== History ==
In 1831 Interior Secretary Antonio Leocadio Guzmán proposed the idea of merging convent libraries and books that were previously scattered throughout the country. While the 1833 decree by then-president José Antonio Páez is the widely accepted date of establishment, it was not until 1870 that a "solid base for the functioning of the [National Library] was established."

In 1874 president Antonio Guzmán Blanco mandated that the collections of the convent libraries were to be delivered to the Universidad Central de Venezuela. These collections would ultimately be added to the National Library, then located in the university campus.

The first printed catalog, the Catalog of the Library of the University of Caracas, was published in 1875 by Adolfo Ernst, a prominent scientist who would go on to become the director in 1876.

== See also ==
- List of libraries in Venezuela
- Literature of Venezuela
- List of national libraries
