= List of libraries in Venezuela =

This is a list of libraries in Venezuela.

== Libraries by state ==
=== Amazonas ===
- Biblioteca Pública Atabapo
- Biblioteca Pública Aupa
- Biblioteca Pública Autana
- Biblioteca Pública Ayacucho
- Biblioteca Pública Central Simón Rodríguez
- Biblioteca Pública Cocuy
- Biblioteca Pública Guaicaipuro
- Biblioteca Pública Manuel Henríquez
- Biblioteca Pública Marcelino Bueno
- Biblioteca Pública Melicio Pérez
- Biblioteca Pública Mereya
- Biblioteca Pública Neyahua
- Biblioteca Pública Puruna

=== Anzoátegui ===
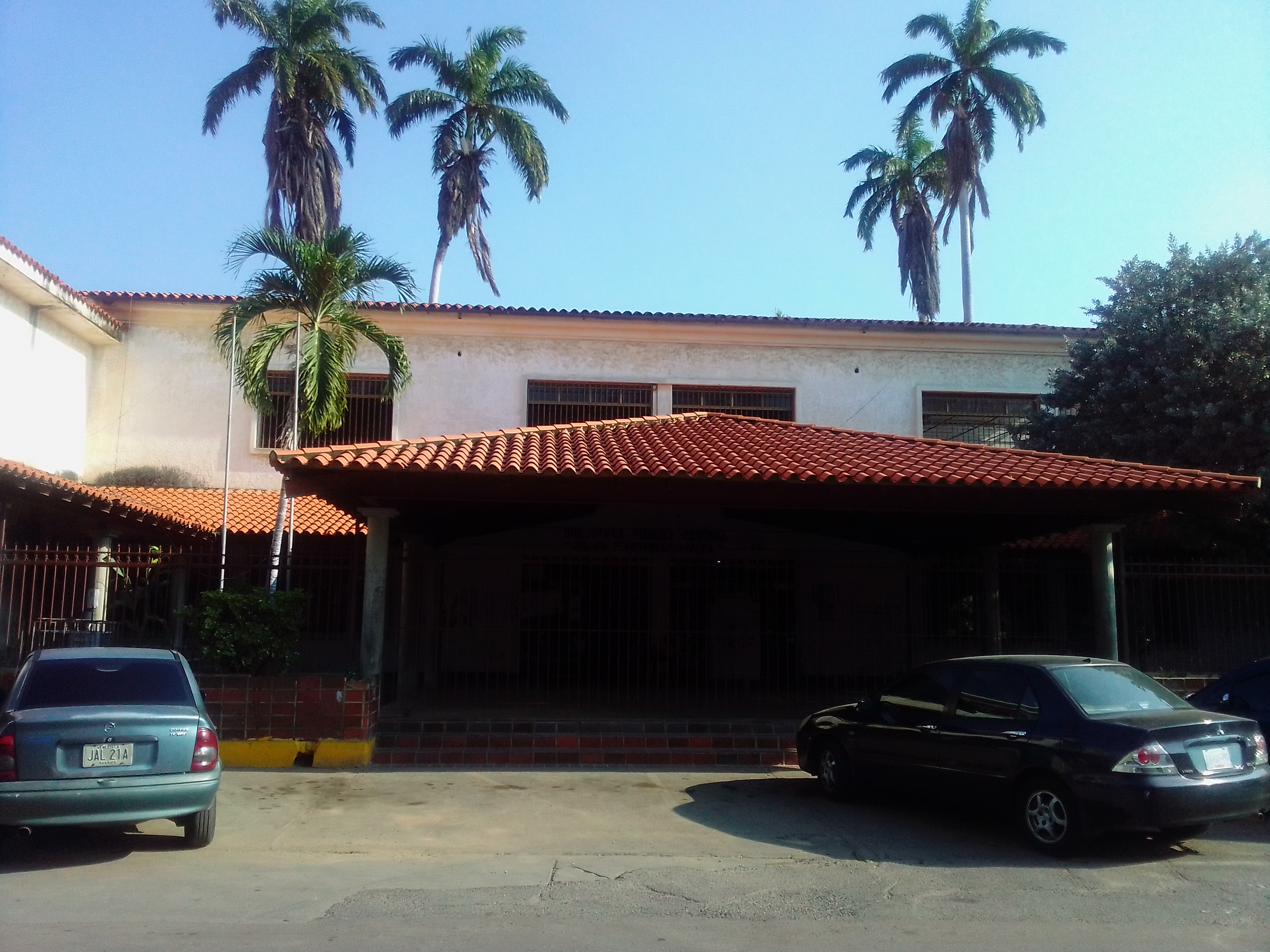
Biblioteca Pública Central Julián Temístocles Maza building in Barcelona, Anzoátegui, Venezuela (photo 2023)

- Biblioteca Pública Adolfo Salvi
- Biblioteca Pública Alfredo Armas Alfonzo
- Biblioteca Pública Alirio Arreaza
- Biblioteca Pública Arevalo González
- Biblioteca Pública Caigua
- Biblioteca Pública Central Julián Temístocles Maza
- Biblioteca Pública Chamariapa
- Biblioteca Pública Enrique Pérez Valencia Tronconal II
- Biblioteca Pública Felipe Rafael Martínez
- Biblioteca Pública Francisco De Miranda
- Biblioteca Pública Fray Juan Mendoza
- Biblioteca Pública Guaraguao
- Biblioteca Pública Ignacio Antonio Batistini
- Biblioteca Pública Juan Antonio Sotillo
- Biblioteca Pública Miguel Otero Silva
- Biblioteca Pública Pedro Manuel Vásquez
- Biblioteca Pública Silvio Ronconis Dalmonte
- Biblioteca Pública Simón Bolívar
- Biblioteca Pública Simón Rodríguez
- S.L. Alí Celta Aponte
- S.L. Andrés Bello
- S.L. Bolivariana
- S.L. Cachama
- S.L. Constantino Maradei Donato
- S.L. Don Ángel Motola
- S.L. Don Cipriano Chacín
- S.L. Hernán Centeno Lusinchi
- S.L. Jesús Márquez
- S.L. José Antonio Anzoátegui
- S.L. José Antonio Anzoátegui
- S.L. Lourdes de Armas
- S.L. Luis Celtad Acosta
- S.L. Maestro Zerpa
- S.L. Manuel Farías España
- S.L. Oscar Guaramatos
- S.L. Plácido Chacón
- S.L. Rómulo Gallegos.- Las Delicias
- S.L. Rómulo Gallegos.- Pozuelos
- S.L. Sabana de Uchire
- S.L. Tronconal III

=== Apure ===
- Biblioteca Pública Amadeo Garbi
- Biblioteca Pública Central José Manuel Sánchez Osto
- Biblioteca Pública Fray J, De Jesús Rojas
- Biblioteca Pública Humberto Barrios Araujo
- Biblioteca Pública José Andrés Ortiz
- Biblioteca Pública José Cornelio Muñoz
- Biblioteca Pública Juana Fernández De Garbi
- Biblioteca Pública Leonardo Ruiz Pineda
- Biblioteca Pública Modesta Pérez De Morales
- Biblioteca Pública Rafael Dopminguez Peña
- Biblioteca Pública Rómulo Gallegos
- Biblioteca Pública Rufino Blanco Fombona
- Biblioteca Pública Santa Rufina

=== Aragua ===
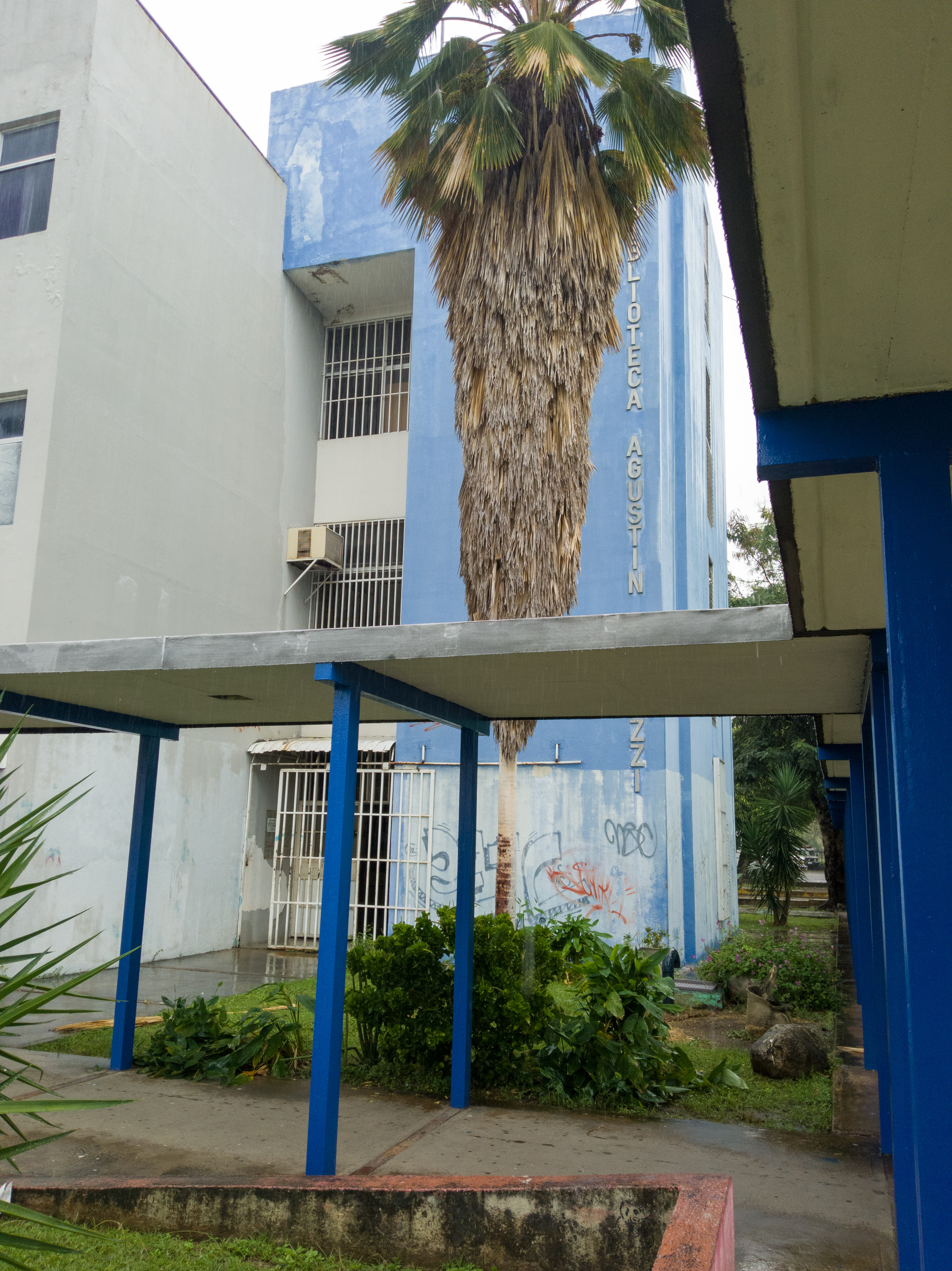
Biblioteca Agustín Codazzi building in Maracay, Venezuela (photo 2021)

- Biblioteca Pública Central Agustín Codazzi
- Biblioteca Pública Aquiles Nazoa
- Biblioteca Pública Elina Cabrera Sosa
- Biblioteca Pública Ezequiel Zamora
- Biblioteca Pública Francisco de Miranda
- Biblioteca Pública Godofredo González
- Biblioteca Pública José Carmelo Matute
- Biblioteca Pública Juan R. González Baquero
- Biblioteca Pública Julio Páez
- Biblioteca Pública Luis Roberto Casado
- Biblioteca Pública María Tecla Herrera
- Biblioteca Pública Nicanor Ramos
- Biblioteca Pública Nuncio Pulido
- Biblioteca Pública Pedro Brea
- Biblioteca Pública Prof. Luis Álvarez
- Biblioteca Pública Richard Wix
- Biblioteca Pública Rita Hernández
- S.L. Aureliano Bolívar
- S.L. Carmen de Cura
- S.L. Daiccy Karina Ledezma
- S.L. El Paseo
- S.L. Isidro Ramón Moreno
- S.L. José Manuel Garnica
- S.L. Juan Bautista Díaz
- S.L. Manuel Vicente Romero
- S.L. Nare
- S.L. Nuestra América
- S.L. Rafael Longorio
- S.L. Santiago Mariño
- S.L. Segundo Ramón Castellanos
- S.L. Teresa de la Parra

=== Barinas ===
- Biblioteca Pública Andrés Eloy Blanco
- Biblioteca Pública Augusto Rivas
- Biblioteca Pública Central Luis Fadul Hernández
- Biblioteca Pública Don Pedro Damían
- Biblioteca Pública Enriqueta Arvelo Larriva
- Biblioteca Pública Francisco Lazo Martí
- Biblioteca Pública Jesús María Hernández
- Biblioteca Pública José Gregorio Diaz Escalante
- Biblioteca Pública Obispos
- Biblioteca Pública Pedro Viscaya
- Biblioteca Pública Rafael Antonio Aliza
- Biblioteca Pública Rómulo Gallegos
- Biblioteca Pública Santa Bárbara
- Biblioteca Pública Sebastián Araujo
- Biblioteca Pública Teresa De La Parra
- S.L. Caimital
- S.L. Carlos Jordán Falcón
- S.L. Manuel Palacio Fajardo

=== Bolívar ===
- Biblioteca Pública Ana Emilia Delón
- Biblioteca Pública Andrés Eloy Blanco
- Biblioteca Pública Bicentenario Del Natalicio Del Libertador
- Biblioteca Pública Bolivariana
- Biblioteca Pública Carlos Rodríguez Jiménez
- Biblioteca Pública Carmelo Castillo
- Biblioteca Pública Central Rómulo Gallegos
- Biblioteca Pública Héctor Arias
- Biblioteca Pública Horacio Cabrera Sifontes
- Biblioteca Pública Hortensia de Pinto
- Biblioteca Pública José Manuel Siso Martínez
- Biblioteca Pública Juan Bautista González
- Biblioteca Pública Juan Fernández
- Biblioteca Pública Juan Vicente González
- Biblioteca Pública Lucas Fernández Peña
- Biblioteca Pública Mario Briceño Iragorry
- Biblioteca Pública Menca de Leoni
- Biblioteca Pública Mercedes Vargas Calderón
- Biblioteca Pública Miguel De Cervantes
- Biblioteca Pública Simón Rodríguez
- Biblioteca Pública Viola de Billings

=== Capital District ===
- Biblioteca Central de la UCAB (in Spanish)
- Biblioteca de la Academia Nacional de la Historia
- Biblioteca Central de la Universidad Simón Bolívar (in Spanish)
- Biblioteca del Banco Central de Venezuela (in Spanish)
- Biblioteca del Congreso
- Biblioteca Los Palos Grandes (in Spanish)
- Biblioteca Pedro Grases (in Spanish)
- Biblioteca Ramón Antonio Villarroel (in Spanish)
- Biblioteca de la Bolsa de Valores de Caracas (in Spanish)
- Central Library (Central University of Venezuela)
- National Library of Venezuela

=== Carabobo ===
- Biblioteca Pública Central Manuel Feo La Cruz
- Biblioteca Pública Aguas Calientes
- Biblioteca Pública Jose Lorenzo Marvez
- Biblioteca Pública Modulo Morón
- Biblioteca Pública Antonieta De Celli
- Biblioteca Pública Bellas Artes
- Biblioteca Pública Carlos Arevalo
- Biblioteca Pública Casa De La Estrella
- Biblioteca Pública Ciudad Alianza
- Biblioteca Pública Ecológica Tierra Viva
- Biblioteca Pública Eleodoro Betancourt
- Biblioteca Pública Enrique Tejera
- Biblioteca Pública Francisco G. Guinán
- Biblioteca Pública Luis Alfredo Colomines
- Biblioteca Pública Manuel María Olivares
- Biblioteca Pública Manuel Pimentel Coronel
- Biblioteca Pública María Clemencia Camarán
- Biblioteca Pública María Escamillo
- Biblioteca Pública María Luisa Escobar
- Biblioteca Pública Miguel Colombet
- Biblioteca Pública Miguel Elías Dao
- Biblioteca Pública Modulo Canima
- Biblioteca Pública Monseñor Jacinto Soto
- Biblioteca Pública Morita Carillo (in Spanish)
- Biblioteca Pública Oscar Romero Padrón
- Biblioteca Pública Simón Bolívar
- P.P. Casa De Todos
- P.P. Ince Colorados
- P.P. Ince Isabélica
- P.P. Josefa Cano De Utrera
- S.L. Augusto Malave Villalba
- S.L. César Rengifo
- S.L. Margot Travieso
- S.L. Rafael Saturno Guerra
- S.L. Rómulo Gallegos
- S.L. Simón Rodríguez
- S.M. Bibliobús I
- S.M. Bibliobús II
- S.M. Bibliobús III

=== Cojedes ===
- B.P.C Andrés Bello
- Biblioteca Pública Esperanza de Castillo
- Biblioteca Pública Francisco Lazo Martí
- Biblioteca Pública Julieta Sánchez
- Biblioteca Pública Marcos R. Alvarado
- Biblioteca Pública Rómulo Gallegos
- Biblioteca Pública Vicente Emilio Sojo
- S.L. Carlos M. Tovar
- S.L. Don Pedro Linares
- S.L. Francisco M. Arias
- S.L. La Candelaria
- S.L. Simón Rodríguez
- S.L. Víctor Mujica

=== Delta Amacuro ===
- Biblioteca Pública Antonio José de Sucre
- Biblioteca Pública Cecilio Acosta
- Biblioteca Pública Central Andrés Eloy Blanco
- Biblioteca Pública Comunitaria Simón Rodríguez
- Biblioteca Pública Comunitaria Yelitza Santaella
- Biblioteca Pública José Balza
- Biblioteca Pública Manuel Piar
- Biblioteca Pública Pérez Bonalde
- Biblioteca Pública Simón Bolívar

=== Falcón ===
- Biblioteca Pública Agustín García
- Biblioteca Pública Agustín Soto Godoy
- Biblioteca Pública Andrés Bello
- Biblioteca Pública Antonio Dolores Ramones
- Biblioteca Pública Batallón De Infanteria
- Biblioteca Pública Br Argenis López Acosta
- Biblioteca Pública Carmen Lucía De Petit
- Biblioteca Pública Celestina Brett De Aldama
- Biblioteca Pública Corralito
- Biblioteca Pública Don Gabriel Martínez
- Biblioteca Pública Eliodoro Julian Fernández
- Biblioteca Pública Fernando Castejón
- Biblioteca Pública Guillermo A. Coronado
- Biblioteca Pública José De Jesús Villasmil
- Biblioteca Pública José Leonardo Chirinos
- Biblioteca Pública Jovina Delgado
- Biblioteca Pública Juan De La Cruz Estévez
- Biblioteca Pública Juan Pablo II
- Biblioteca Pública Las Mercedes
- Biblioteca Pública Lydda Frranco Farías
- Biblioteca Pública María Celia Lázaro De Mindiola
- Biblioteca Pública Miguel Figueroa Jaimes
- Biblioteca Pública Padre Román
- Biblioteca Pública Ramón Ruiz Polanco
- Biblioteca Pública Rogelio Espinoza
- Biblioteca Pública Servando Garcés
- Biblioteca Pública Tulio Arends Wever
- Biblioteca Pública Ulises Sánchez
- Biblioteca Pública Valmore Rodríguez
- Biblioteca Pública Víctor Napoleón Graterol Leal

=== Guárico ===
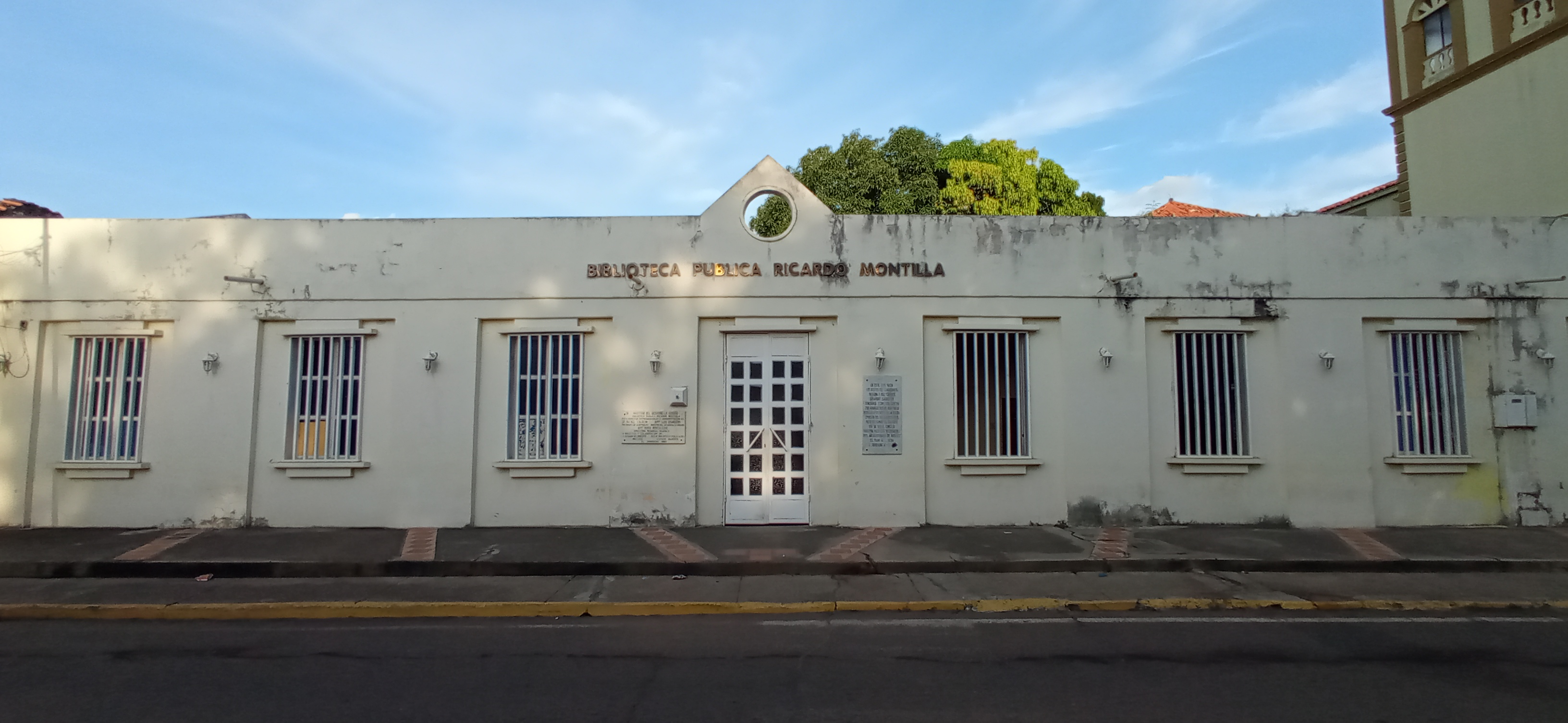
Biblioteca Pública Ricardo Montilla building in El Sombrero, Guárico, Venezuela (photo 2021)

- Biblioteca Pública Adolfo Antonio Machado
- Biblioteca Pública Ana Luisa Llovera
- Biblioteca Pública Antonio Pinto Salinas
- Biblioteca Pública Central Rómulo Gallegos
- Biblioteca Pública Efraín Hurtado
- Biblioteca Pública Elsa Sánchez Risso
- Biblioteca Pública Flor María Manuitt
- Biblioteca Pública General José Ramón Núñez
- Biblioteca Pública Las Mercedes Rojas de Pérez
- Biblioteca Pública Pedro Escobar Ramírez
- Biblioteca Pública Pedro Oropeza Volcán
- Biblioteca Pública Ricardo Montilla
- S.L. Aminta Díaz
- S.L. Arturo Rodríguez
- S.L. Gladys Rodríguez de Páez
- S.L. Julio César Sánchez Olivo
- S.L. Las Majaguas
- S.L. Modesto Freites Piñate
- S.L. Ricardo Montilla -STA. María De Ipire
- S.L. Rosalía Campins de Herrera

=== La Guaira ===
- Biblioteca Pública Caruao
- Biblioteca Pública Central José María España
- Biblioteca Pública Chuspa
- Biblioteca Pública Danilo Ánderson
- Biblioteca Pública La Sabana
- Biblioteca Pública Osma
- S.L. Caraballeda
- S.L. Pio Rengifo
- S.L. Rafael Martínez Salas

=== Lara ===
- Biblioteca Pública Alcides Losada
- Biblioteca Pública Andrés Bello
- Biblioteca Pública Andrés Eloy Blanco
- Biblioteca Pública Aura Bartolon De Rojas
- Biblioteca Pública Carlos Romero
- Biblioteca Pública Central Pío Tamayo
- Biblioteca Pública Dr.Pascual Venegas Filardo
- Biblioteca Pública Ezequiel Bujanda
- Biblioteca Pública Federico Carmona
- Biblioteca Pública Guillermo De León
- Biblioteca Pública José Gil Fortoul
- Biblioteca Pública José Guevara
- Biblioteca Pública José Herrera Oropeza
- Biblioteca Pública José María Nieles
- Biblioteca Pública Juan Bautista Rodríguez
- Biblioteca Pública La Esperanza
- Biblioteca Pública Leonardo Ruiz Pineda
- Biblioteca Pública Mosquera Suárez
- Biblioteca Pública Otto Civodanes Lira
- Biblioteca Pública Padre Fortucci
- Biblioteca Pública Riera Aguinagalde
- Biblioteca Pública Rómulo Betancourt
- Biblioteca Pública Romulo Gallegos
- Biblioteca Pública Simón Bolívar
- Biblioteca Pública Torrellas

=== Mérida ===
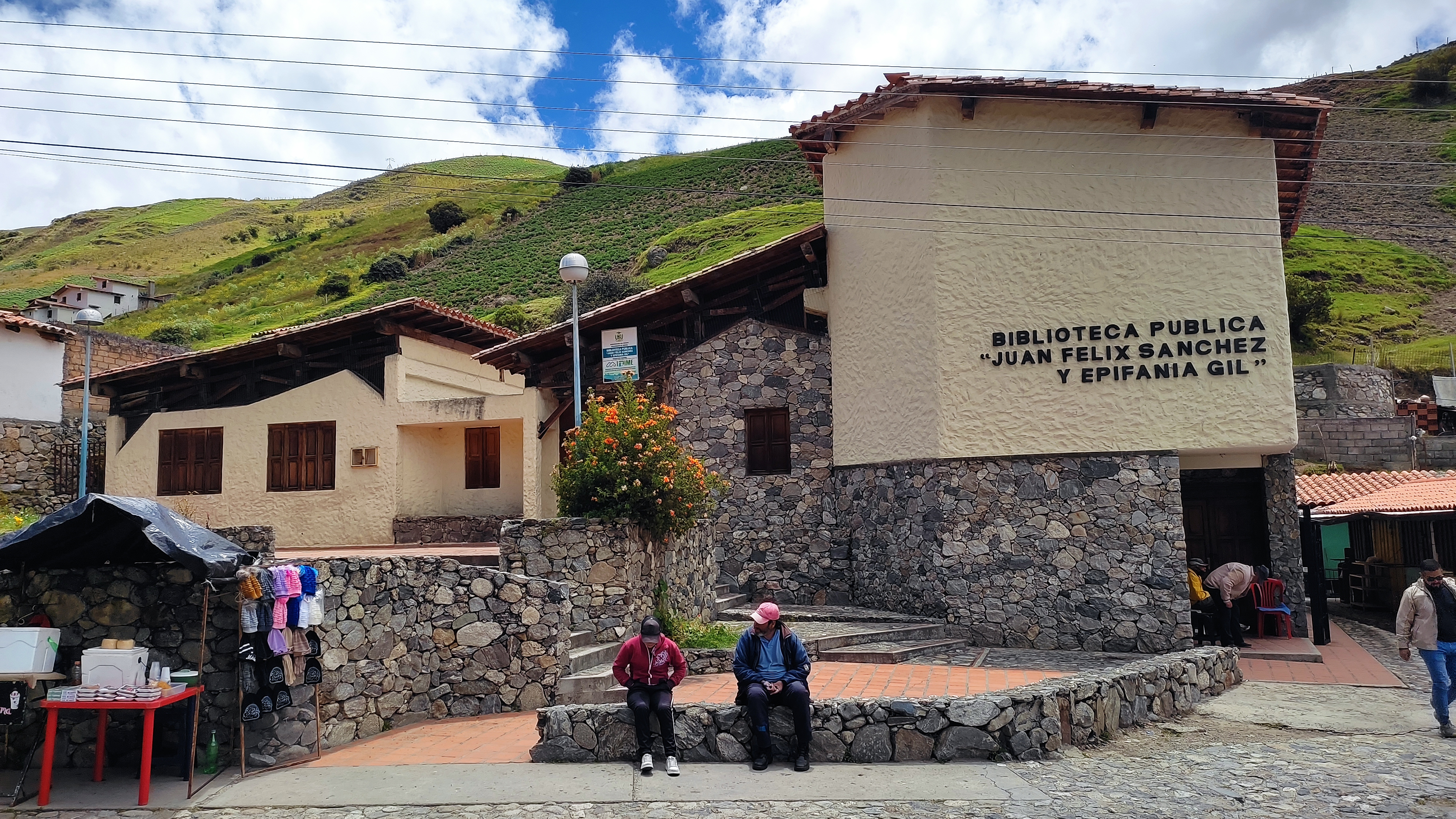
Biblioteca Pública Juan Félix Sánchez y Epifanía Gil building in San Rafael de Mucuchíes, Mérida, Venezuela (photo 2023)

- Biblioteca de la Universidad de los Andes
- Biblioteca Pública Carlos Muñoz Oraá
- Biblioteca Pública Central Simón Bolívar
- Biblioteca Pública Clara Vivas Briceño
- Biblioteca Pública Consuelo Navas
- Biblioteca Pública Eutimio Rivas
- Biblioteca Pública Héctor Roviro Ruiz
- Biblioteca Pública José Vicente Escalante
- Biblioteca Pública Juan Félix Sánchez y Epifanía Gil
- Biblioteca Pública Julia Ruiz
- Biblioteca Pública Las Acacias
- Biblioteca Pública Libertador
- Biblioteca Pública Merley Mejías
- Biblioteca Pública Presbítero José Ramón Gallegos
- Biblioteca Pública Rafael Corredor Rojas
- Biblioteca Pública Raúl Ramos Giménez
- Biblioteca Pública Rivas Dávila
- S.L. Andrés Eloy Blanco
- S.L. Antonio Pinto Salinas
- S.L. Balmore Carrero
- S.L. Bicentenario
- S.L. Blanca Julia de Dugarte
- S.L. Br. Mario Bonilla
- S.L. Carabobo
- S.L. Carmen Valverde
- S.L. Don Simón Rodríguez
- S.L. El Morro
- S.L. Emiro Duque Sánchez
- S.L. Generalísimo Francisco de Miranda
- S.L. Independencia
- S.L. José Humberto Paparoni
- S.L. José Vicente Nucete
- S.L. Julio César Salas
- S.L. Linis Guerrero
- S.L. Luis Alberto Lobo
- S.L. Manuel Molina
- S.L. Mariana Mozart
- S.L. Mesa de las Palmas
- S.L. Nectario Hernán Barillas
- S.L. Padre Duque
- S.L. Rodolfo Mora
- S.L. Santa Elena de Arenales
- S.L. Teresa de la Parra
- S.L. Tomas Castelao
- S.L. Valparaíso
- S.M. Bibliobús

=== Miranda ===
- Biblioteca Pública Adolfo Castillo
- Biblioteca Pública Antonio Ramón Rodríguez
- Biblioteca Pública Bartolomé Blandín
- Biblioteca Pública Caucaguita
- Biblioteca Pública Central Cecilio Acosta
- Biblioteca Pública Cristobal Rojas
- Biblioteca Pública Don Luis Correa
- Biblioteca Pública Don Luis Y Misia Virginia (in Spanish)
- Biblioteca Pública Doña Isa
- Biblioteca Pública Doña Menca De Leoni
- Biblioteca Pública Emilio R. Meza
- Biblioteca Pública Emma Soler
- Biblioteca Pública Generalisimo F. De Miranda
- Biblioteca Pública Jesús Isidora Rojas
- Biblioteca Pública José De San Martín
- Biblioteca Pública José Emil Velásquez
- Biblioteca Pública José Gregorio Hernández
- Biblioteca Pública José Isaac Sojo
- Biblioteca Pública José León Mijares
- Biblioteca Pública José Rafael Araujo
- Biblioteca Pública José Vicente Espejo
- Biblioteca Pública Juan De La Cruz Machado
- Biblioteca Pública Juan Pablo Sojo
- Biblioteca Pública Juan Vicente González
- Biblioteca Pública Judith Lacler
- Biblioteca Pública Julián M. Ortega
- Biblioteca Pública La Dolorita
- Biblioteca Pública Las González
- Biblioteca Pública Margarita Moya Montevideo
- Biblioteca Pública Misia Ana De Infante
- Biblioteca Pública Nelson Luis Martínez
- Biblioteca Pública Rafael Vicente Egui
- Biblioteca Pública Raúl Leoni
- Biblioteca Pública Rómulo Gallegos
- Biblioteca Pública Roque Pinto
- Biblioteca Pública San José De Onova
- Biblioteca Pública Sebastián Díaz Alfaro
- Biblioteca Pública Tito Cardozo
- S.L. Andrés Eloy Blanco
- S.L. Dunia Farías
- S.L. Eulalia Buroz
- S.L. Gregorio Osses
- S.L. Laguneta De La Montaña
- S.L. Pedro Matías Camuñas
- S.L. Santa Rosa Lima
- S.L. Zoraida Rojas
- S.M. Bibliobús Altos Mirandinos
- S.M. Bibliobús Barlovento
- S.M. Bibliobús Petare
- S.M. Bibliobús Valles Del Tuy

=== Monagas ===
- B.P.M. Estela De Salazar
- B.R.E. Medicina
- Biblioteca Pública Antonio Mota Salazar
- Biblioteca Pública Aragua
- Biblioteca Pública Barrancas
- Biblioteca Pública Boquerón
- Biblioteca Pública Caicara
- Biblioteca Pública Candelaria Call
- Biblioteca Pública Cayetano Farias
- Biblioteca Pública Central Dr. Julián Padrón
- Biblioteca Pública El Furrial
- Biblioteca Pública El Guácharo
- Biblioteca Pública El Tejero
- Biblioteca Pública Félix Antonio Calderón
- Biblioteca Pública José Ángel Meza Verde
- Biblioteca Pública Jusepin
- Biblioteca Pública Morón
- Biblioteca Pública Pedro Luis López
- Biblioteca Pública Quiriquire
- Biblioteca Pública República Del Uruguay
- Biblioteca Pública Temblador
- Biblioteca Pública Uracoa
- Biblioteca Pública William Phelps
- S.L. Alto De Los Godos
- S.L. Alto Paramaconi
- S.L. Andrés Eloy Blanco
- S.L. Antonio José De Sucre
- S.L. Areo
- S.L. Barrio Bolívar
- S.L. Casa De Los Niños
- S.L. Chaguaramal
- S.L. Chaguaramas
- S.L. Doña Menca
- S.L. El Corozo
- S.L. Jesús María Tamoy
- S.L. Jose Angel Oropeza Ciliberto
- S.L. La Cruz
- S.L. La Muralla
- S.L. La Puente
- S.L. Las Alhuacas
- S.L. Las Brisas
- S.L. Punta De Mata
- S.L. Sabana De Piedra
- S.L. Sabana Grande
- S.L. San Vicente

=== Nueva Esparta ===
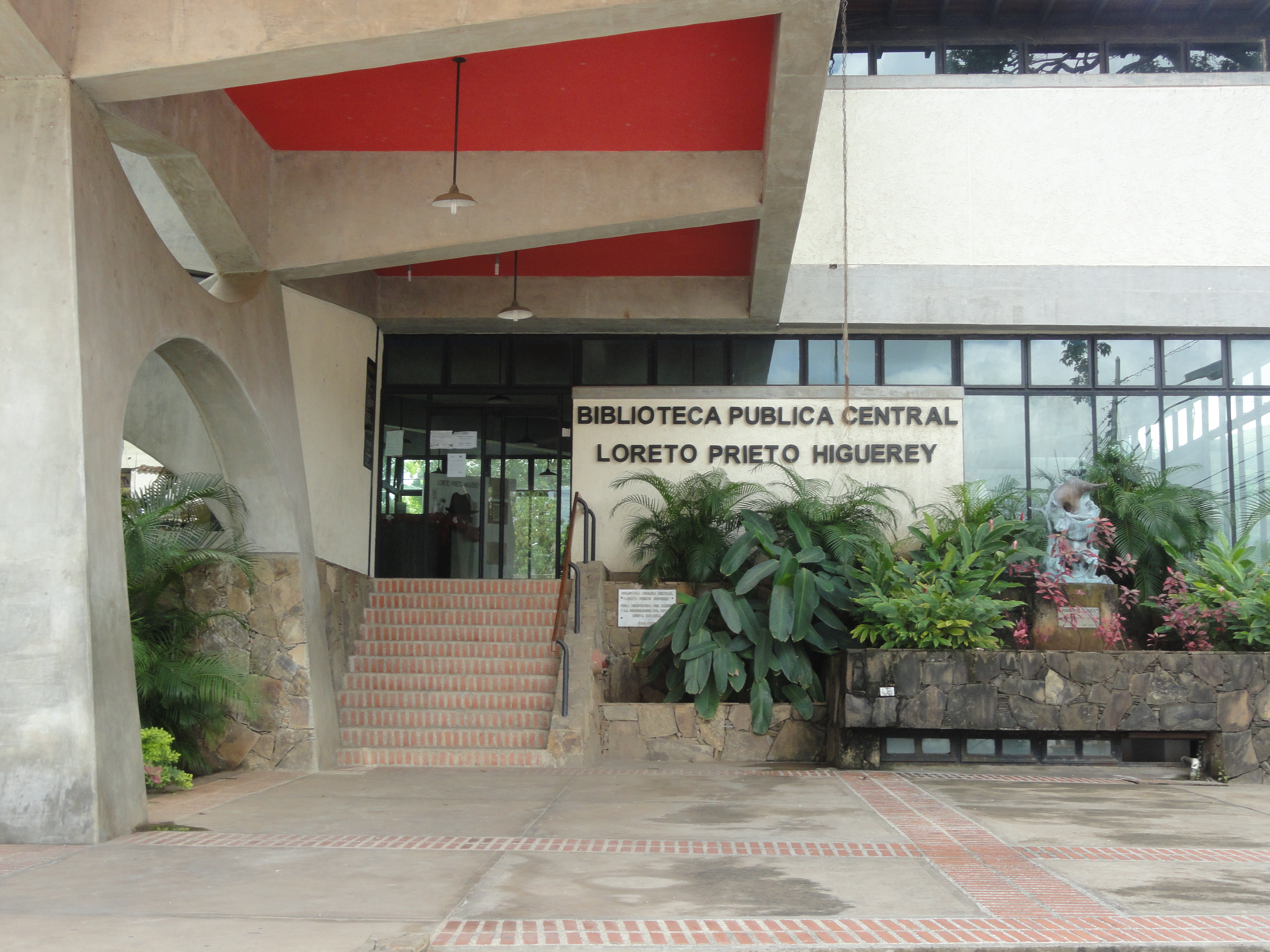
Biblioteca Central Loreto Prieto Higuerey building in La Asunción, Nueva Esparta, Venezuela (photo 2014)

- Biblioteca Pública Agapito Salgado
- Biblioteca Pública Augusto Núñez
- Biblioteca Pública Central Loreto Prieto Higuerey
- Biblioteca Pública Dr. Luis Beltrán Prieto Figueroa
- Biblioteca Pública Dr. Ramón Espinoza Reyes
- Biblioteca Pública Dr. Rigoberto Marín
- Biblioteca Pública Efraín Subero
- Biblioteca Pública Eugenio
- Biblioteca Pública Francisca Quijada
- Biblioteca Pública Isadra Gómez González
- Biblioteca Pública José Joaquín Salazar Franco
- Biblioteca Pública José Ramón Villarroel
- Biblioteca Pública Juan Cancio Rodríguez
- Biblioteca Pública Justa Mata Gamboa
- Biblioteca Pública La Guardia
- Biblioteca Pública Los Millanes
- Biblioteca Pública Luís Beltrán Prieto Figueroa
- Biblioteca Pública Luis Rojas Vásquez
- Biblioteca Pública Misael David Salazar Leidenz
- Biblioteca Pública Mtra. Nélida Salazar
- Biblioteca Pública Mtro. Guzmán Salazar
- Biblioteca Pública Mtro. Jesús Santiago Gómez Moreno
- Biblioteca Pública Noris de Velásquez
- Biblioteca Pública Pbro. Manuel Montaner
- Biblioteca Pública Prof. Jesús Manuel Subero
- Biblioteca Pública Prof. Jesús Nicolás Rodríguez
- Biblioteca Pública Ramón Borra Gómez
- Biblioteca Pública Régulo Guerra Salcedo
- Biblioteca Pública Rosauro Rosa Acosta
- Biblioteca Pública Tiburcio Moya
- S.L. Felipe Romero
- S.L. Mtro. Godofredo Valerio

=== Portuguesa ===
- Biblioteca Pública 29 De Septiembre
- Biblioteca Pública Antonio Graterol
- Biblioteca Pública Central Dr. Alirio Ugarte Pelayo
- Biblioteca Pública Dr. José María Vargas
- Biblioteca Pública El Playon
- Biblioteca Pública Hermano Nectario María
- Biblioteca Pública José Antonio Páez
- Biblioteca Pública José Luis Cabrera
- Biblioteca Pública Manolito Escalona
- Biblioteca Pública Manuel Barrios Freites
- Biblioteca Pública Monseñor Unda
- Biblioteca Pública Ospino
- Biblioteca Pública Panchita De Montes
- Biblioteca Pública Prof. Juan Colmenares
- Biblioteca Pública Rómulo Gallegos
- Biblioteca Pública Santa Elena
- Biblioteca Pública Simón Bolívar
- S.L. Agua De Ángel
- S.L. Aparición De Ospino
- S.L. Boconoito
- S.L. Choro
- S.L. Las Tinajitas
- S.L. Musiu Carmelo
- S.L. Papelón
- S.L. Paujicito
- S.L. Samuel Dario Paredes
- S.L. San Nicolás
- S.L. Tucupido

=== Sucre ===
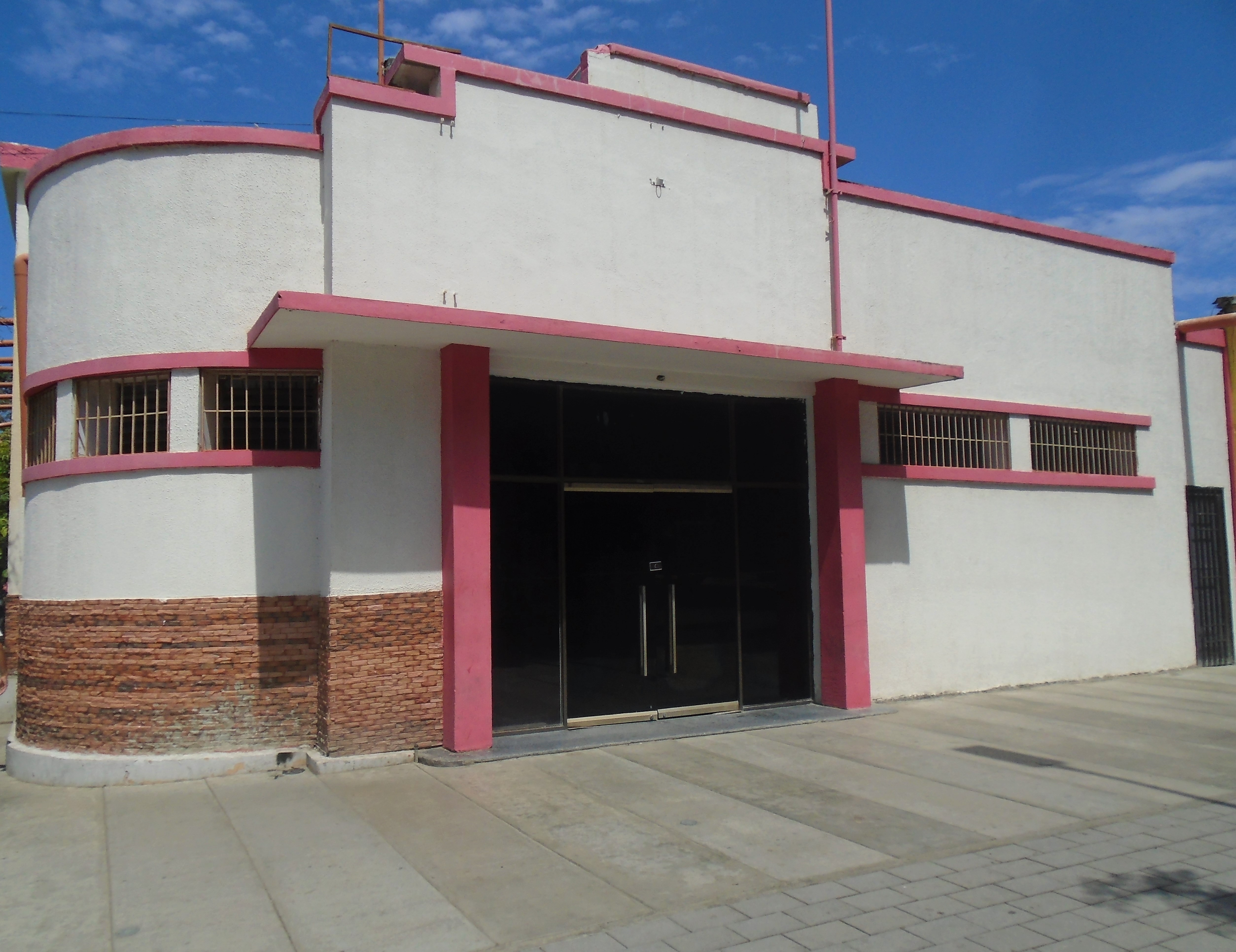
Biblioteca Central Armando Zuloaga Blanco building in Cumaná, Sucre, Venezuela (photo 2017)

- Biblioteca Pública Alberto Carnevali
- Biblioteca Pública Andrés Eloy Blanco
- Biblioteca Pública Apolinar Lemus
- Biblioteca Pública Aricagua
- Biblioteca Pública Ateneo De Carupano
- Biblioteca Pública Carmen Vasquez Ruiz
- Biblioteca Pública Cecilio Acosta
- Biblioteca Pública Central Armando Zuloaga Blanco
- Biblioteca Pública Chacopata
- Biblioteca Pública Chiguana
- Biblioteca Pública Cristobal Colón
- Biblioteca Pública Cruz Salmeron Acosta
- Biblioteca Pública Don Carlos Subero
- Biblioteca Pública Doña Ines Subero
- Biblioteca Pública Dras. Arcady Rodas Y Ricnia Vizcaino
- Biblioteca Pública Eduardo Blanco
- Biblioteca Pública Elena María Barrios
- Biblioteca Pública Ernesto Cardenal
- Biblioteca Pública Especializada En Arte Tito Salas
- Biblioteca Pública Fray Damian López De Haro
- Biblioteca Pública José Antonio Ramos Sucre
- Biblioteca Pública José Gibbs Cañas
- Biblioteca Pública Juan Manuel Rodríguez
- Biblioteca Pública La Soledad Del Charcal
- Biblioteca Pública Las Mercedes
- Biblioteca Pública Luisa Caseres De Arismendi
- Biblioteca Pública Miguel López Alcala
- Biblioteca Pública Pedro R. Gómez V.
- Biblioteca Pública Playa Grande
- Biblioteca Pública Rio Casanay
- Biblioteca Pública Rómulo Gallegos
- Biblioteca Pública Salvador José Mata
- Biblioteca Pública San Martín
- Biblioteca Pública Santa Fe
- Biblioteca Pública Servicio De Apoyo Al Docente
- Biblioteca Pública Simón Rodríguez

=== Táchira ===
- Biblioteca Pública Abejales
- Biblioteca Pública Andrés Bello
- Biblioteca Pública Arturo Michelena
- Biblioteca Pública Benito Roncayolo
- Biblioteca Pública Carlos Evento Rodríguez
- Biblioteca Pública Central Leonardo Ruiz Pineda
- Biblioteca Pública Daniel Rivas Moreno
- Biblioteca Pública Dr. Alberto Díaz González
- Biblioteca Pública El Piñal
- Biblioteca Pública Hemeroteca
- Biblioteca Pública Juan Solerii
- Biblioteca Pública La Grita
- Biblioteca Pública La Tendida
- Biblioteca Pública Las Margaritas De Táriba
- Biblioteca Pública Las Mesas
- Biblioteca Pública Libertad
- Biblioteca Pública Lic. Gladis Lozada De Pérez
- Biblioteca Pública Maestro Crisanto Garcia
- Biblioteca Pública Manuela Paz De Pulido
- Biblioteca Pública Pedro María Ureña
- Biblioteca Pública Pregonero
- Biblioteca Pública Prof Carlota Sánchez De Ramírez
- Biblioteca Pública Prof. Aura Elena Moros
- Biblioteca Pública Prof. Carmen Mora De Pulido
- Biblioteca Pública Prof. Horacio Moreno
- Biblioteca Pública Prof. José Samuel Suárez Alarcón
- Biblioteca Pública Prof. Julia Tarazona
- Biblioteca Pública Queniquea
- Biblioteca Pública Regina De Velásquez
- Biblioteca Pública Rubio
- Biblioteca Pública San Antonio
- Biblioteca Pública Santa Ana
- Biblioteca Pública Simón Rodríguez
- Biblioteca Pública Umuquema
- Biblioteca Pública Unidad Vecinal
- S.L. Coloncito
- S.L. Dr. Juan Germán Roscio
- S.L. General Cipriano Castro
- S.L. José Eufracio Chacón Varela
- S.L. Lino Roso Colmenares
- S.L. Manuel Antonio Gámez
- S.M. Bibliobús

=== Trujillo ===
- B.P.M. Albino Segundo Pacheco
- Biblioteca Pública Andrés Bello
- Biblioteca Pública Armando Madrid
- Biblioteca Pública Central Mario Briceño Iragoorry
- Biblioteca Pública Don Luis Sáez
- Biblioteca Pública Iasura Saavedra
- Biblioteca Pública Lucila de Marín
- Biblioteca Pública Luis Carrasquero Cabello
- Biblioteca Pública Oscar Sambrano Urdaneta
- Biblioteca Pública Pbro. Juan de Dios Andrade
- Biblioteca Pública Rosario Montero De Morón
- Biblioteca Pública Victor Manuel Briceño
- P.P. Victor Valera Martínez
- S.L. Araujo José Magdaleno
- S.L. Armisticio
- S.L. Cira Leal De Pérez
- S.L. Dr. Germán Virgilio Díaz
- S.L. Fernando Márquez Saavedra
- S.L. Guillermo Pujol
- S.L. Heracleo Godoy
- S.L. Humberto Castellanos
- S.L. José del Carmen Briceño
- S.L. Josefa María Becerra
- S.L. Julia Josefina Ruiz
- S.L. Julieta Fuenmayor
- S.L. Luis Ignacio Bastidas
- S.L. Luisa Amalia de Vega
- S.L. María Antonia Valderrama
- S.L. Padre Cano
- S.L. Padre Vásquez
- S.L. Rosa Lugo
- S.L. San José
- S.L. Santa Isabel
- S.L. Segundo Ramón Castellanos
- S.L. Simón Bolívar
- S.L. Simón Rodríguez
- S.L. Yolanda de González

=== Yaracuy ===
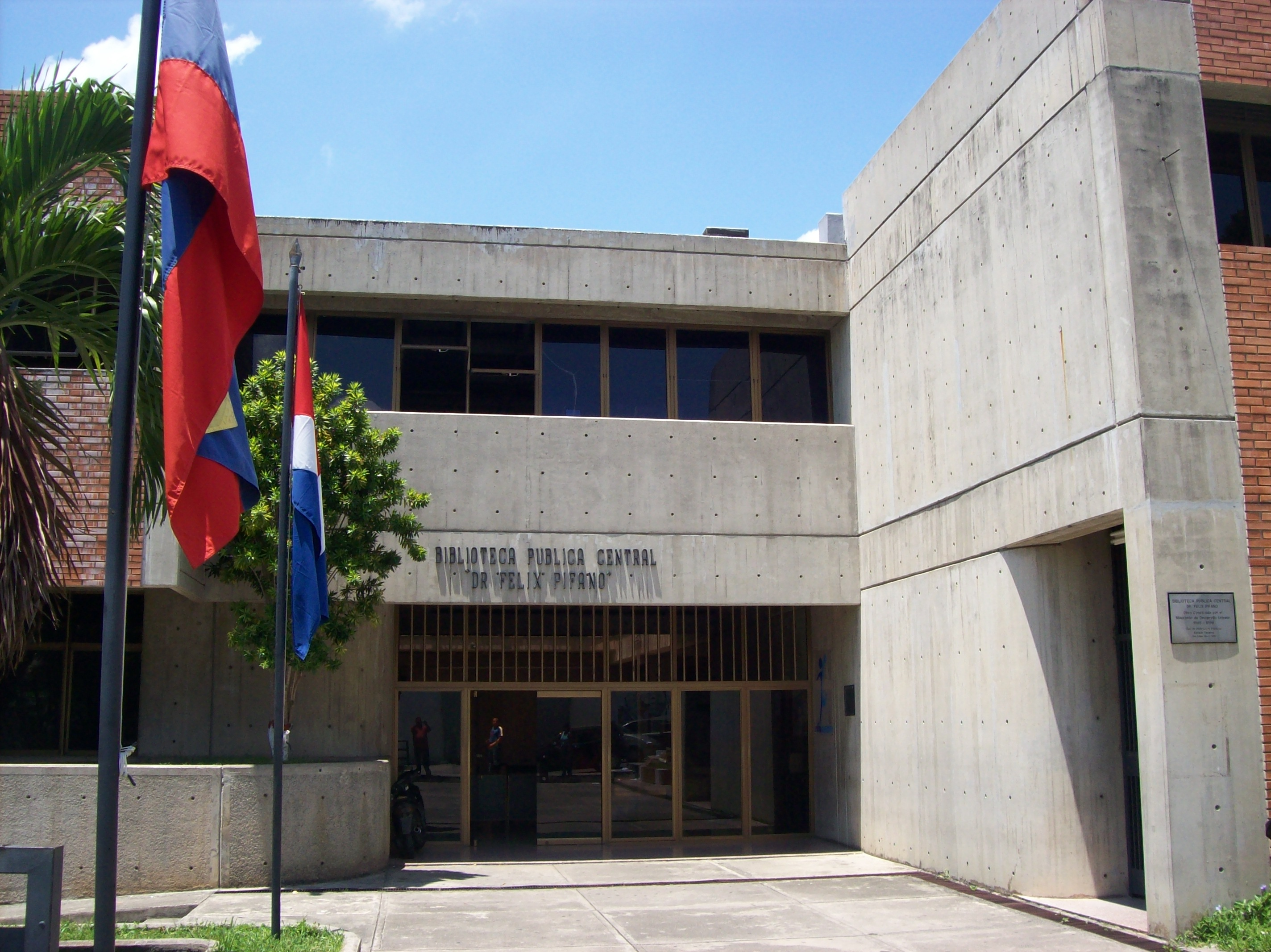
Biblioteca Felix Pifano building in San Felipe, Yaracuy, Venezuela (photo 2008)

- Biblioteca Pública Central Dr. Félix Pifano
- Biblioteca Pública Domingo Oviedo Paradas
- Biblioteca Pública José Alfonso Daza
- Biblioteca Pública Josefa Marín de Nárvaez
- Biblioteca Pública Julia Rosa de López
- Biblioteca Pública Mercedes Cordido
- Biblioteca Pública Rómulo Gallegos
- Biblioteca Pública Rubén Suárez Moreno
- Biblioteca Pública Soc. Oswaldo Méndez
- P.P. Andrés Bello
- P.P. Arturo Uslar Pietri
- P.P. Ingrid Fernández de Oropeza
- P.P. Lucrecia Adam
- P.P. Simón Bolívar
- S.L. Celsa Mendoza Reyes
- S.L. Euclides Herrera
- S.L. La Morita
- S.L. Luis Alberto Principal
- S.L. María Eva de Liscano
- S.L. San Javier
- S.L. Simón Rodríguez

=== Zulia ===
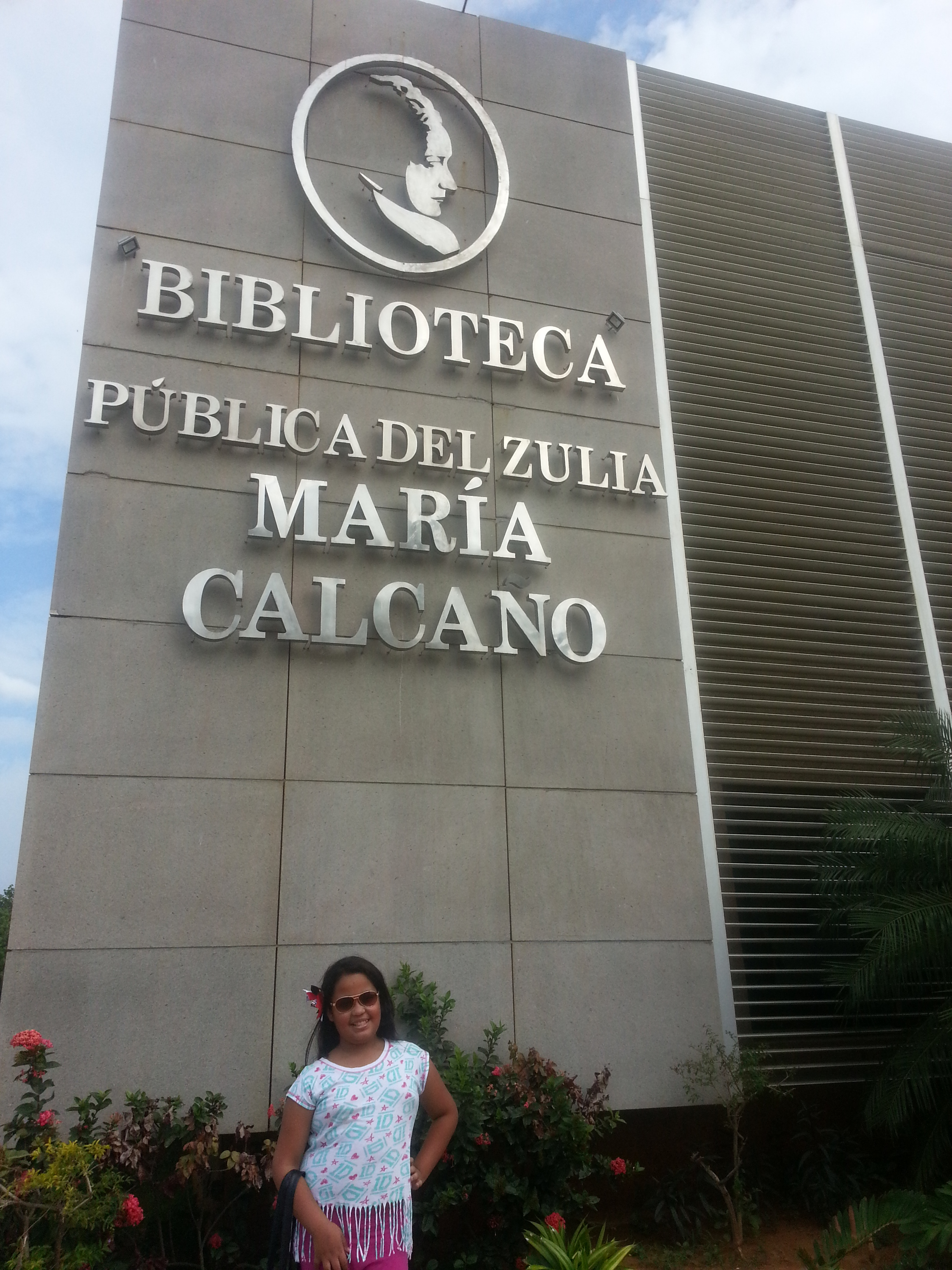
Biblioteca Pública Central María Calcaño building in Zulia, Venezuela (photo 2014)

- Biblioteca Pública Ana María Campos
- Biblioteca Pública Arturo Uslar Pietri (in Spanish)
- Biblioteca Pública Betilde Montes
- Biblioteca Pública Br. Armando Colina
- Biblioteca Pública Central María Calcaño (in Spanish)
- Biblioteca Pública David Scott
- Biblioteca Pública Dr. Omar Baralt
- Biblioteca Pública Ida Malek de Petkcoff
- Biblioteca Pública Jesús María Semprún
- Biblioteca Pública Juyou
- Biblioteca Pública Maestro Delio Núñez
- Biblioteca Pública Mnons. Domingo Roa Pérez
- Biblioteca Pública Niño Simón
- Biblioteca Pública Parque Bolívar
- Biblioteca Pública Salvador García
- Biblioteca Pública San Benito
- Biblioteca Pública Santo Tomás de Aquino
- Biblioteca Pública Simón Bolívar
- S.L. Adalberto Gutiérrez
- S.L. Andrés Eloy Blanco
- S.L. Ángel de la Guarda
- S.L. Antonio Basilio Borjas
- S.L. Antonio Ricaurte
- S.L. Ciccon Rudolf Esteindr
- S.L. El Paraujano
- S.L. Hijos del Sol
- S.L. José Antonio Páez
- S.L. José Cenobio Urribarri
- S.L. Lic. Omaira de Hernández
- S.L. Maisel Serrano Andrade
- S.L. Marcelino Champagnat
- S.L. María Alejandrina
- S.L. Monseñor Miguel A. Aurrecoechea
- S.L. Nuestra Señora de Pompeya
- S.L. Pbro. Francisco Sánchez C.
- S.L. Prof. César Martínez Valero
- S.L. Rosalia de Fernández

== See also ==
- List of archives in Venezuela
- Venezuelan literature
- History of libraries in Latin America
