= Art of Mateo Manaure in University City of Caracas =

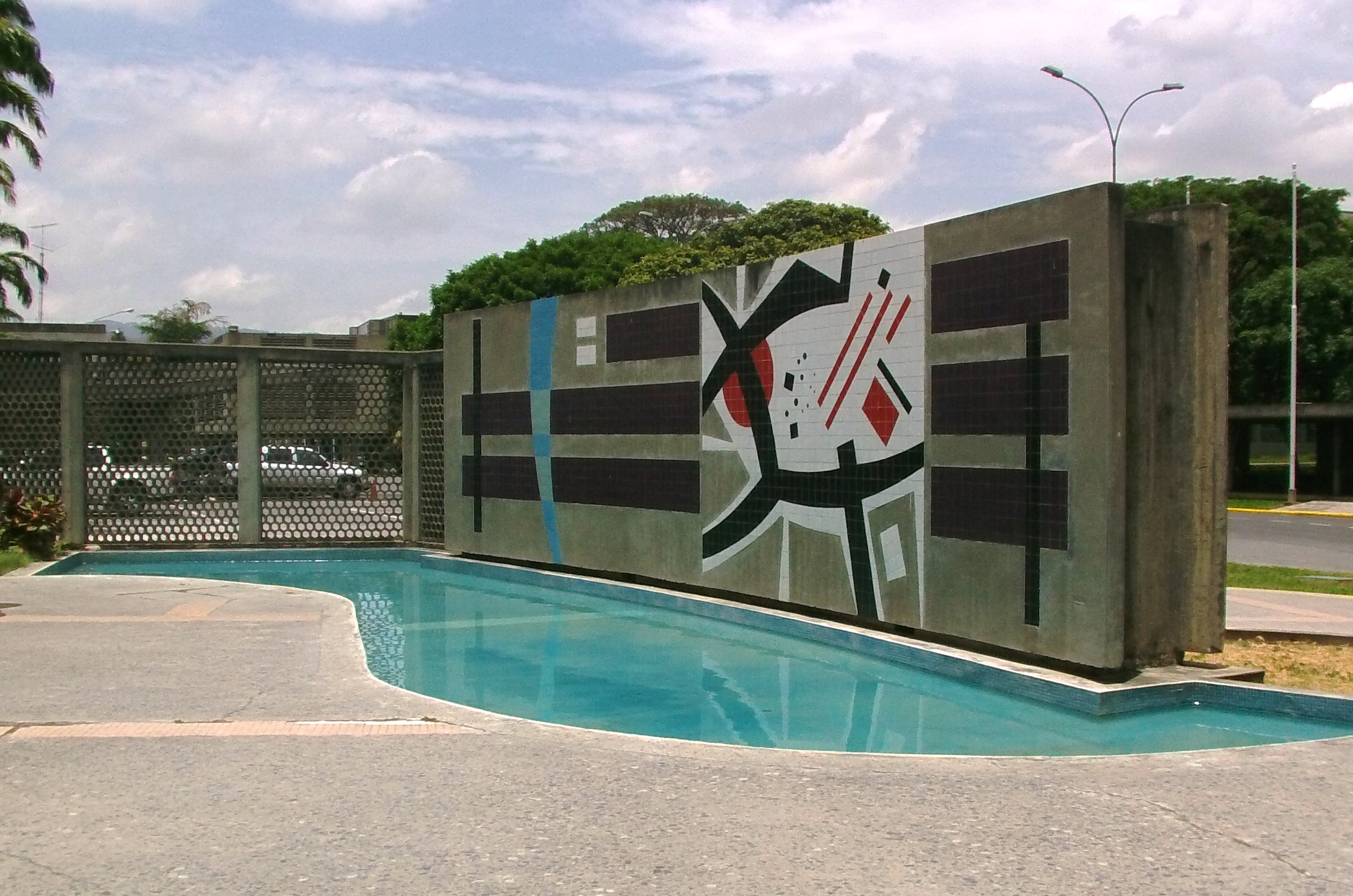
Untitled bimural, 1954, Plaza Cubierta, University City of Caracas

Venezuelan artist Mateo Manaure was commissioned to create pieces for the University City of Caracas.

Manaure has a reported 26 pieces of work on the campus. Though his pieces are mostly ceramic murals, he also created wooden acoustic frames and stained-glass windows. (Note: The Durban Segnini Gallery reported 25, El Nacional reported 27.) Most were completed in the 1950s, but one was commissioned in 1998.

== Background ==
Mateo Manaure won the National Prize for Plastic Arts for young artists in 1947, shortly after completing his studies at the Caracas School of Arts. His prize was a trip to Paris. He took his classmate Pascual Navarro with him, and they met other Venezuelan artists, founding Los disidentes. In 1952 Manaure and Carlos González Bogen opened the Galería Cuatro Muros in Caracas, showcasing the designs and style of many of the artists involved with the University City of Caracas project, as well as continuing the work of the Los disidentes magazine. It was the first time abstract art was displayed in Venezuela.

Between 1952 and 1954, Manaure worked intensely in collaboration with architect Carlos Raúl Villanueva, who was in charge of the campus project. The majority of the murals on the campus were designed by Manaure, and he was the artist with the greatest number of works in it. Manaure was also the artwork supervisor of the project.

== Style ==
As part of Los disidentes, Manaure – whose formal training was in traditional art styles – developed mural design techniques to incorporate art with urban design. He felt that the group, having experienced and learnt from art of other cultures and new developments in modernism, had a responsibility to develop a national art with these sensibilities. Working in art for urbanism, a growing trend in the 1950s in Latin America due to new advances in both fields, Manaure experimented with repeated geometric shapes "in search of his own style and [with] attention to [...] functionality." He was also concerned with color, saying in later life:

Color is for me the lyrical element by essence, where the colored vibration is the pendulous principle of life. The taste for thematic repetition is the antipode of my personality; I am constantly vigilant of renovation, always ready to face the challenge of tomorrow as an adventure of new plastic ideas, which allow us to enrich our visual language, be it abstract or neo-figurative...

El color es para mí el elemento lírico por esencia, donde la vibración coloreada es principio pendular de la vida. El gusto por la repetición temática es una antípoda de mi personalidad; estoy en vigilia constante de renovación, siempre dispuesto a afrontar el reto del mañana como una aventura de nuevas ideas plásticas, que permiten enriquecer nuestro lenguaje visual sea abstracto o neofigurativo en una sensibilidad y coherente.

According to the Durban Segnini Gallery, reflecting on Manaure's life work in 2013, the works he produced for the campus "belong to a creative cycle supported by strong geometric abstraction with well-defined edges and solid-colored planes, known during his [career] as "geometric mural painting"." Manaure studied Villanueva's principles of the Synthesis of the Arts, with a focus on how his murals would fit in their place; the various designs of the murals were planned to enhance the architectural planes of the university, as well as differentiating the functions of different spaces. The Durban Segnini Gallery also notes that Manaure's murals are harmonic with murals by other artists contributing to the project.

== Murals ==
=== Olympic Stadium murals ===
The artwork of the Olympic Stadium was the second phase of Villanueva's campus design. For the artwork here, he called on members of Los disidentes: Manaure and Bogen as well as Armando Barrios. Their designs also embodied the Synthesis of the Arts. As with many of the murals, they were paintings transferred to sheets of ceramic tiles.

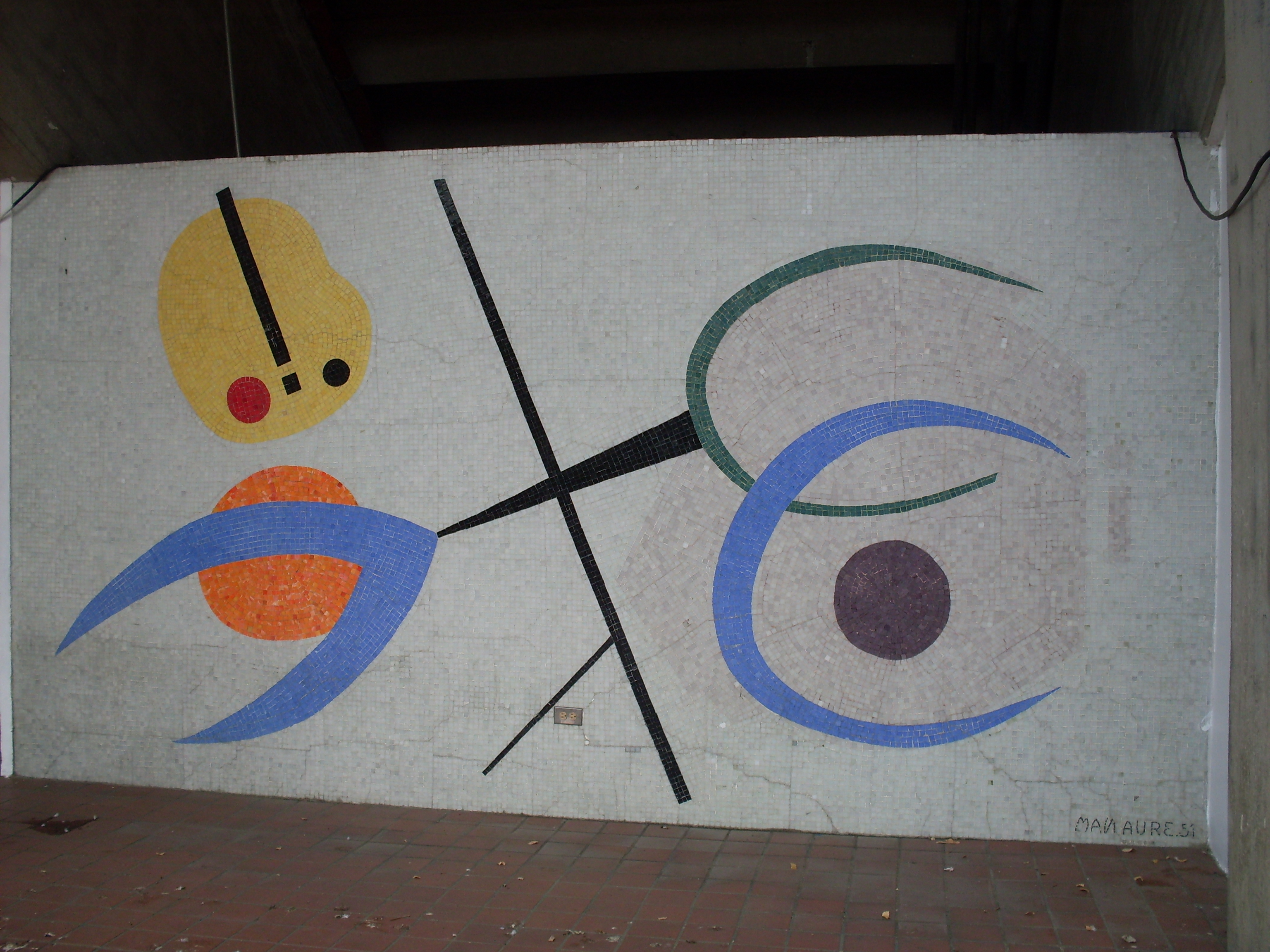
Untitled mural, 1951, Olympic Stadium

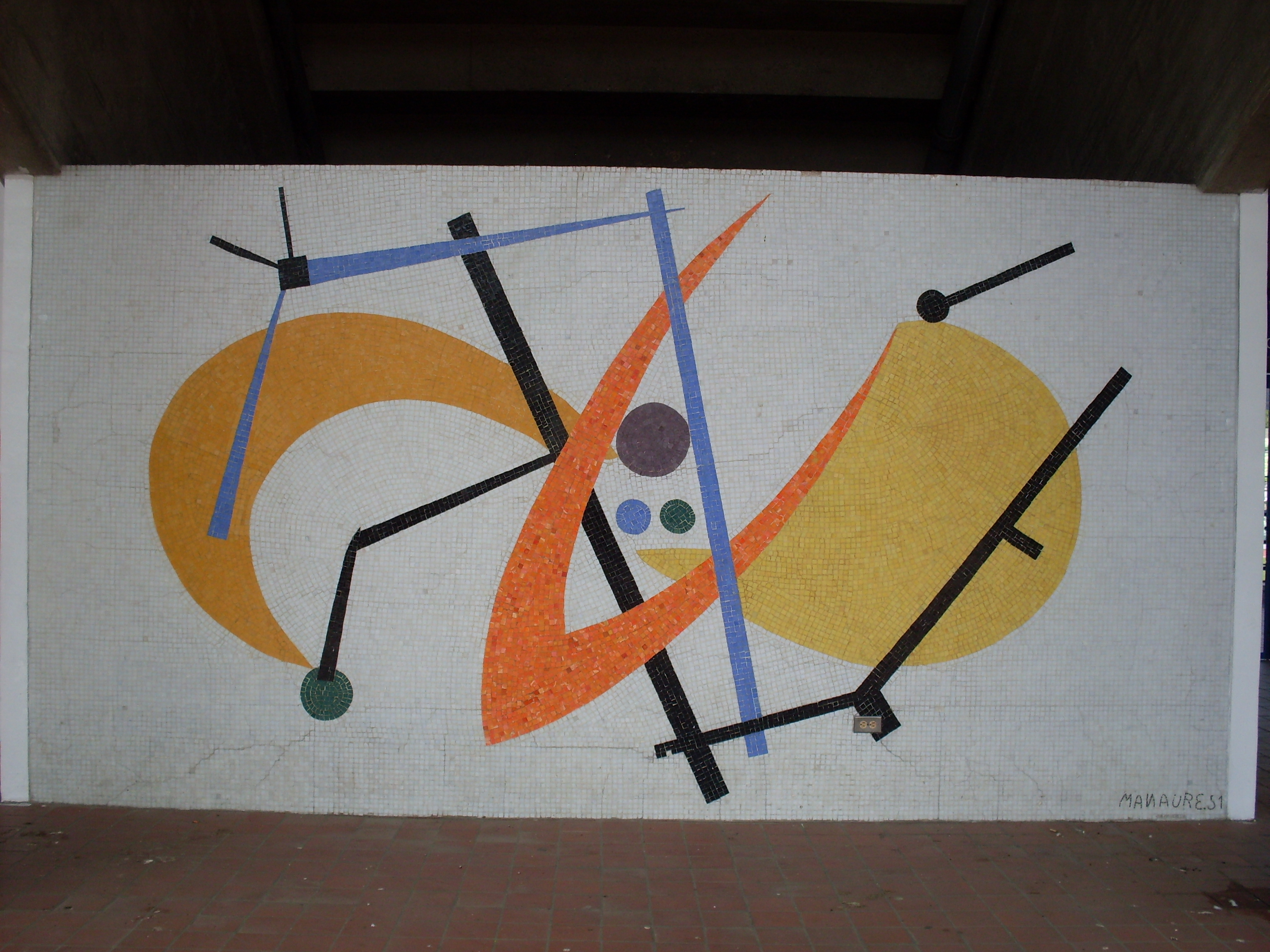
Untitled mural, 1951, Olympic Stadium

=== Plaza Cubierta murals ===
Manaure's mural on the exterior of the curved Sala de Conciertos – in yellow, blue, black, and red – was said by Venezuelan heritage historian Mayerling Lopez to be an inventive response to the architectural restrictions, one that also created dynamism by combining horizontal stripes within vertical stripes, and the other way around. It covers the east facade of the hall and measures 640 cm × 1,465 cm (252 in × 577 in). This mural and the one on the north face of the Paraninfo were both installed by Caracas ceramics firm Llamart CA in 1954 and reconstructed by Cerámicas Carabobo in 1985. The Paraninfo mural, a white background with quadrilateral shapes in red, yellow, green, and blue, with dark line patterns, measures 945 cm × 1,670 cm (372 in × 657 in).

Another of Manaure's murals lies by the entrance of the Sala de Conciertos within the Plaza Cubierta, parallel to the Victor Vasarely mural Positive – Negative. This red, white, black and blue mural measures 288 cm × 1,570 cm (113 in × 618 in). Other Manaure murals, the bimural and curved mural, are described by the Durban Segnini Gallery as two of the most important. The bimural stands by the Berger des Nuages sculpture, adding color to the space, and measures approximately 302 cm × 1,196 cm (119 in × 471 in) on both sides. The curved mural measures 308.5 cm × 1,000 cm (121.5 in × 393.7 in) around.

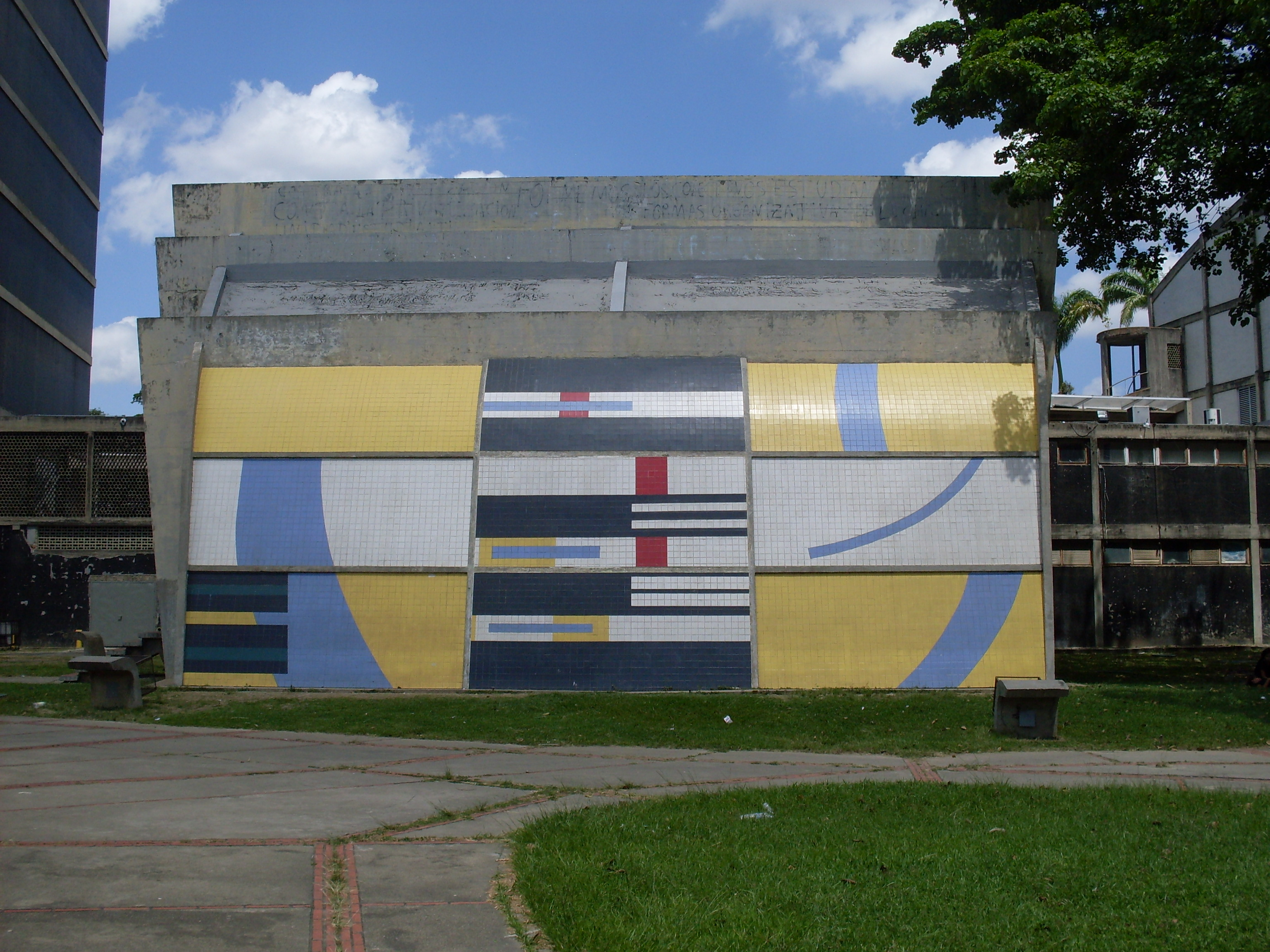
Untitled mural, 1954, Sala de Conciertos (Tierra de nadie/Plaza Cubierta)

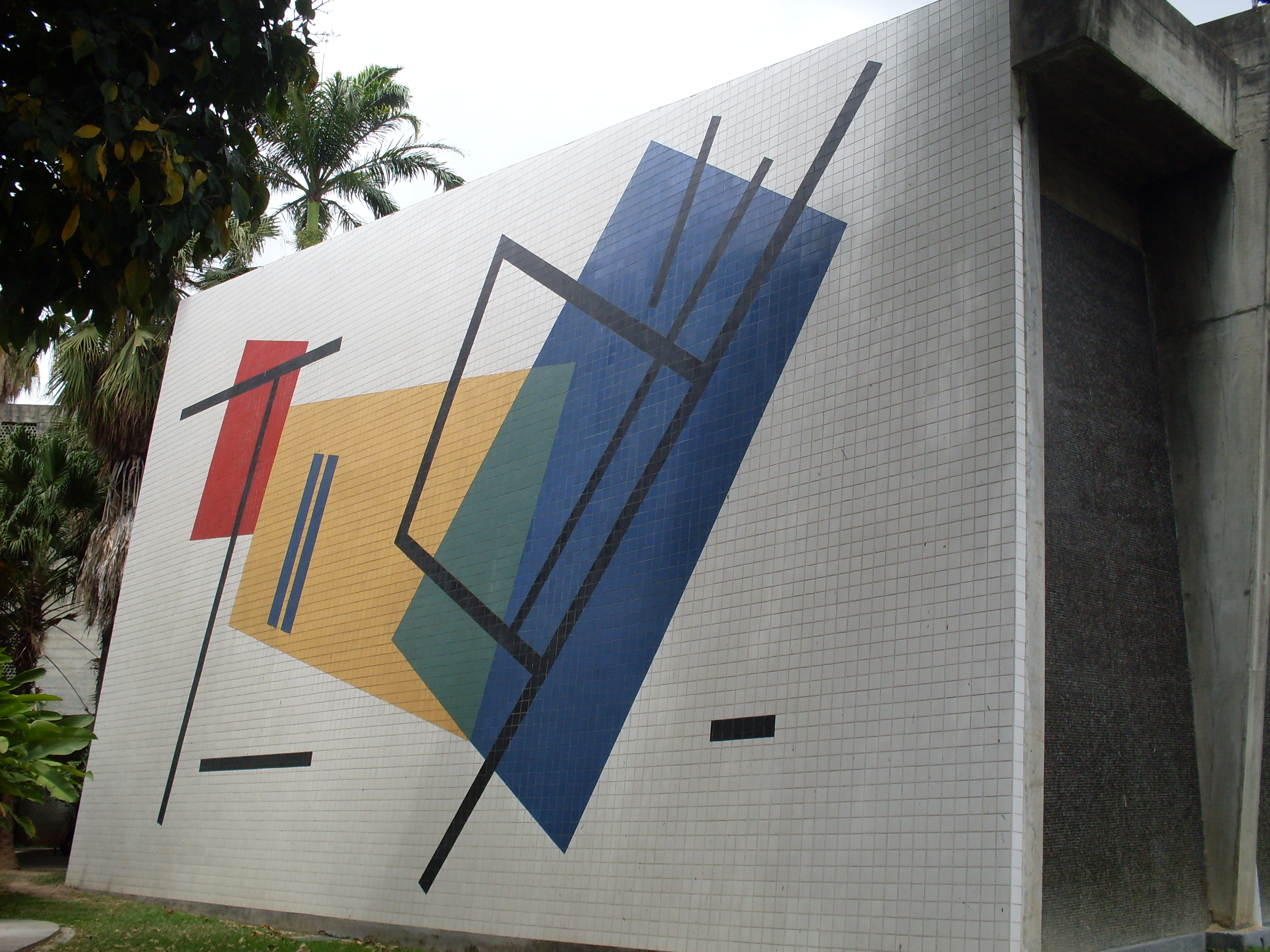
Untitled mural, 1954, Paraninfo (Plaza Cubierta)

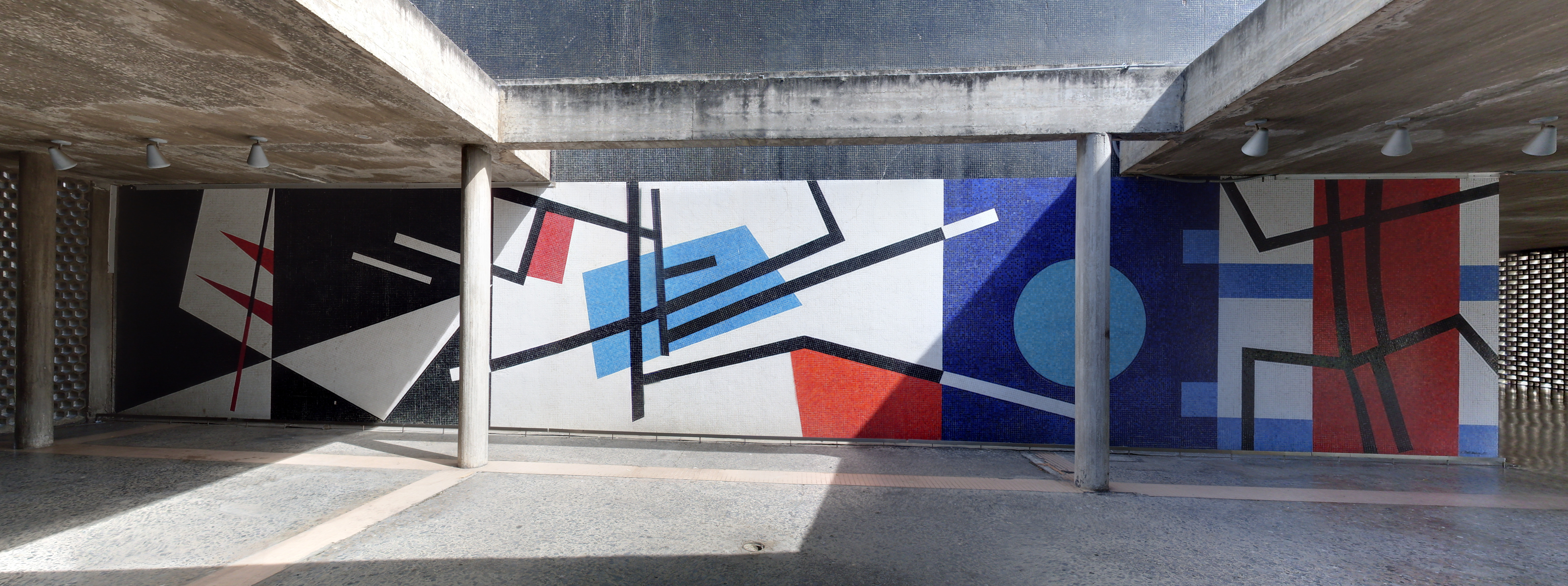
Untitled mural, 1954, Plaza Cubierta (Sala de Conciertos entrance)

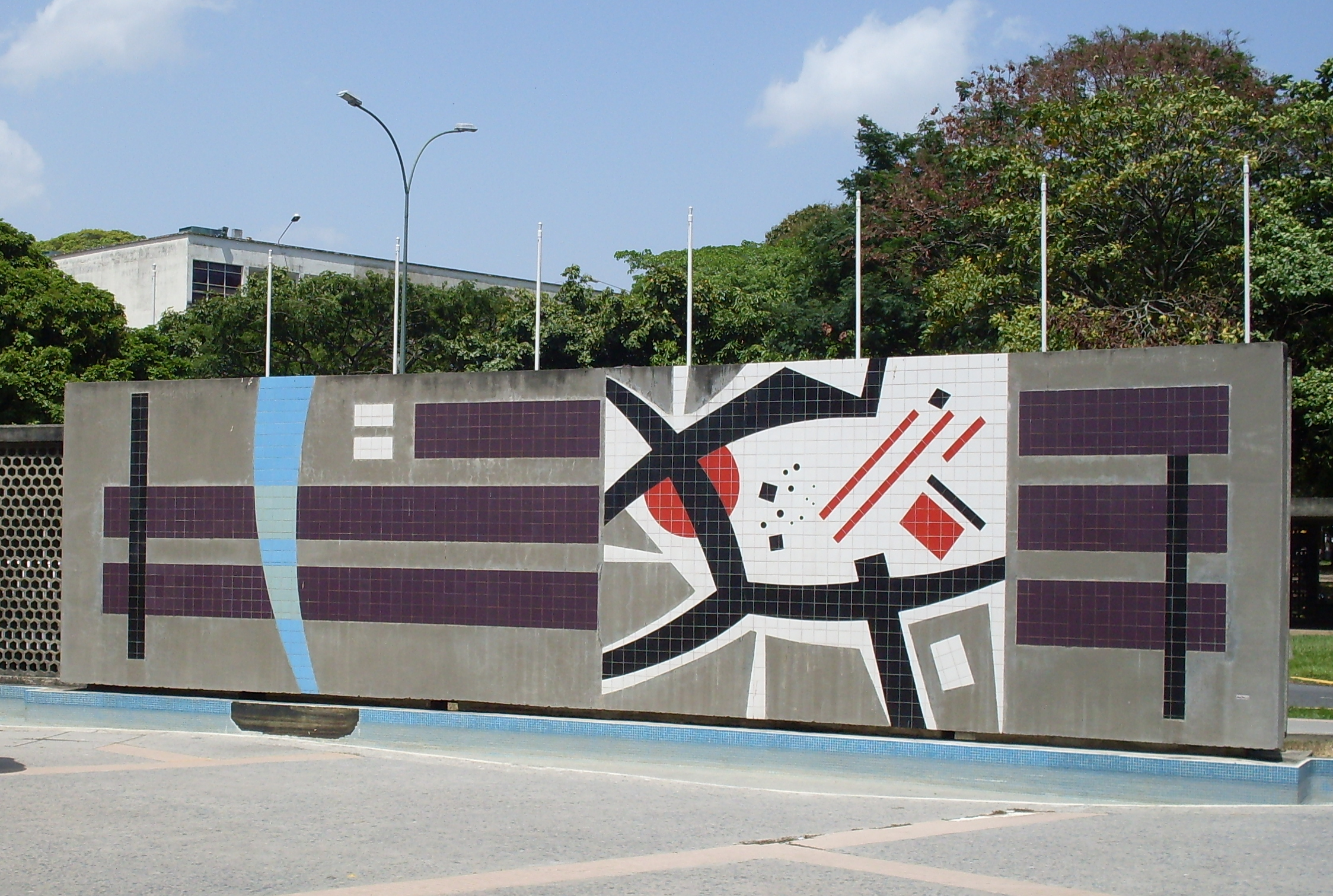
Untitled bimural (north face), 1954, Plaza Cubierta

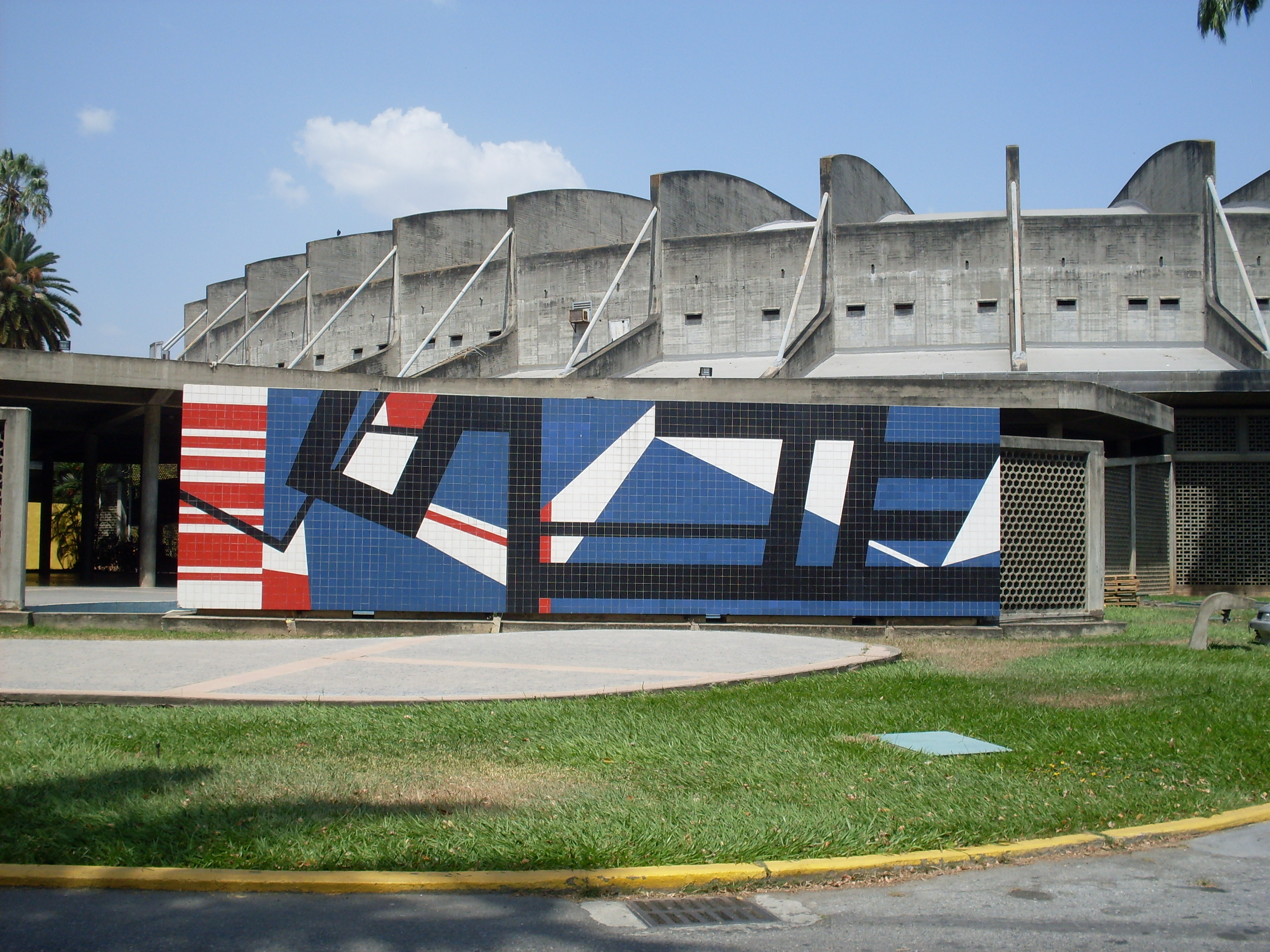
Untitled bimural (south face), 1954, Plaza Cubierta

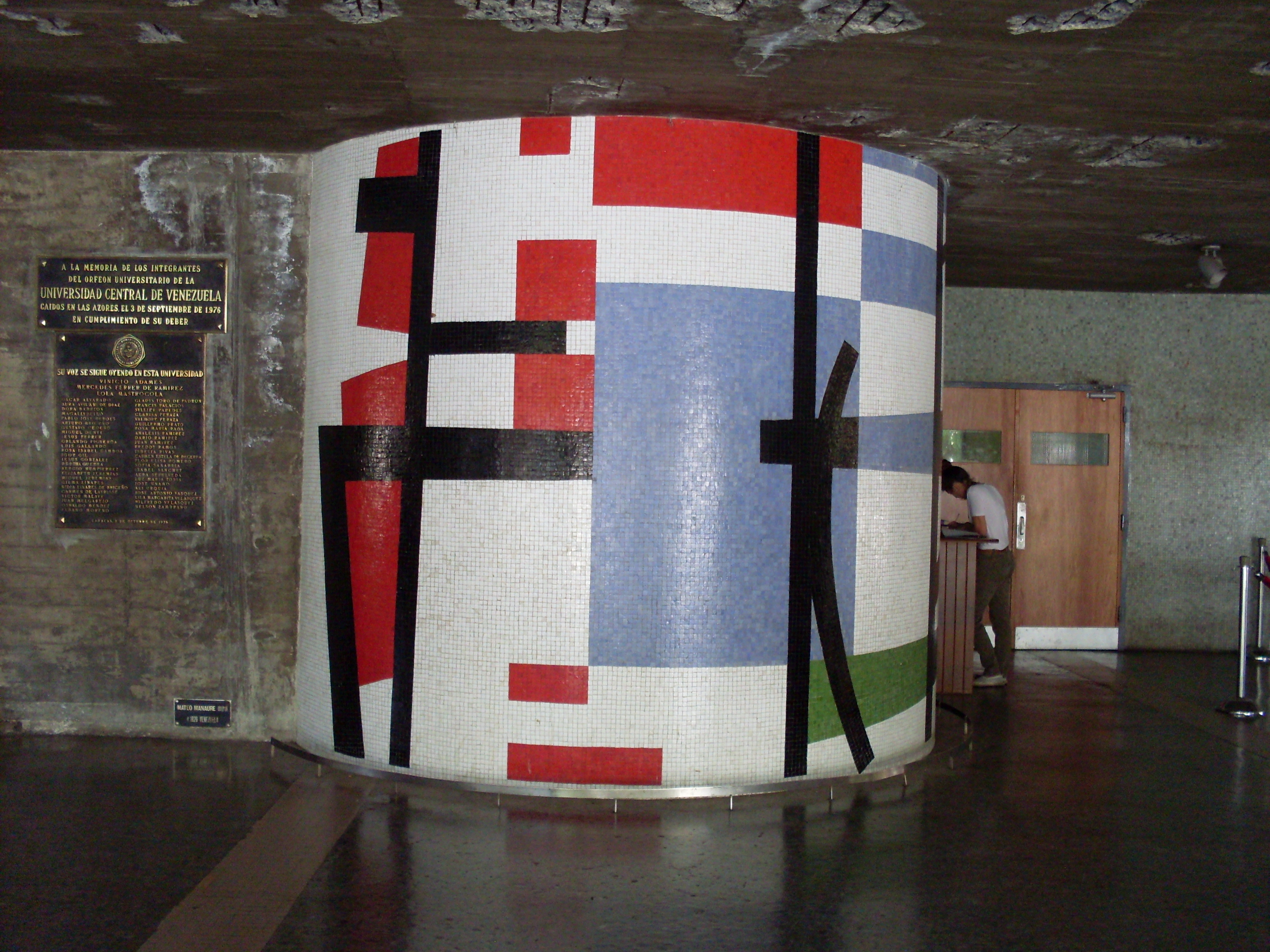
Untitled curved mural (front view), 1954, Aula Magna (Plaza Cubierta)

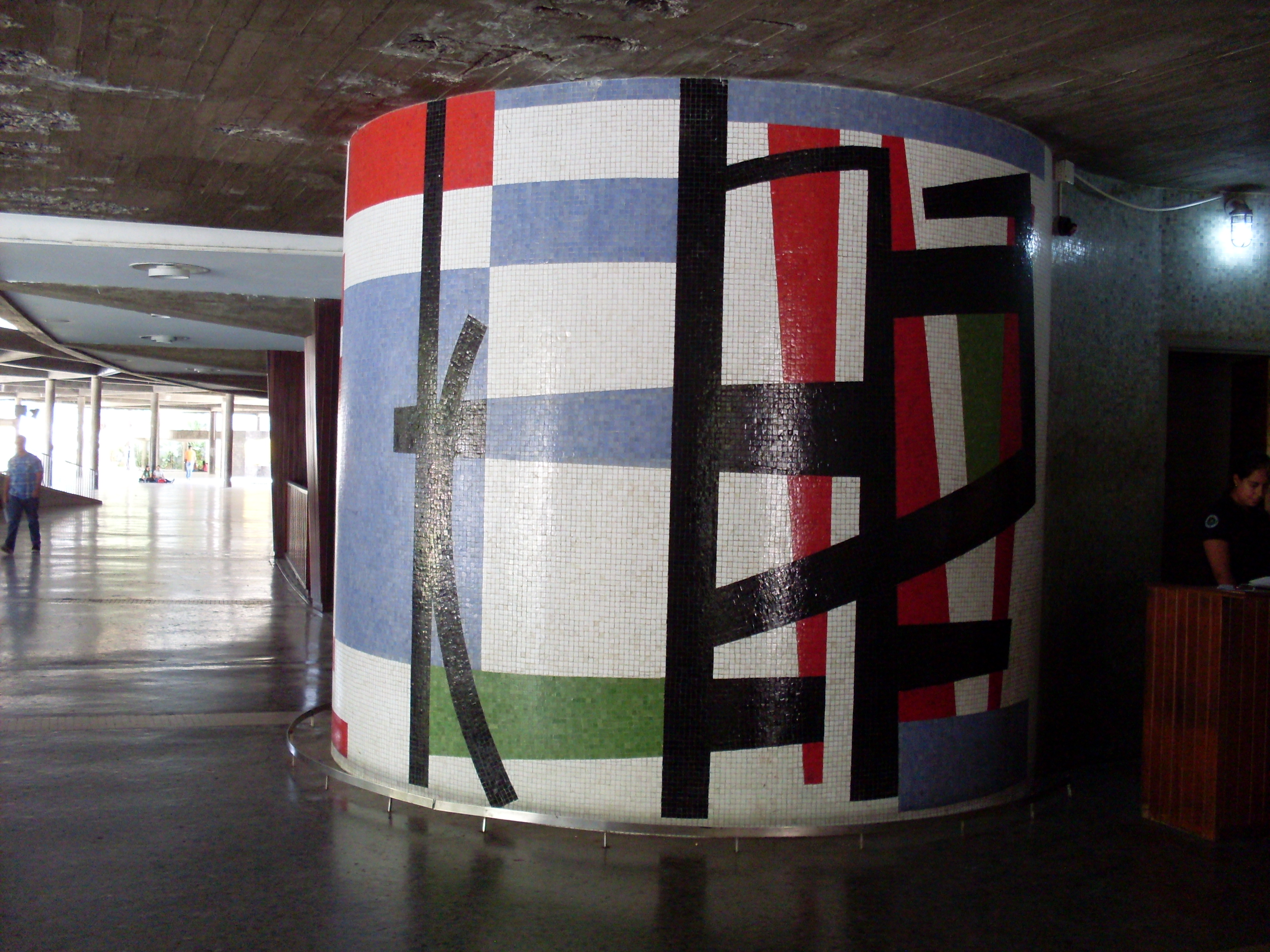
Untitled curved mural (side view), 1954, Aula Magna (Plaza Cubierta)

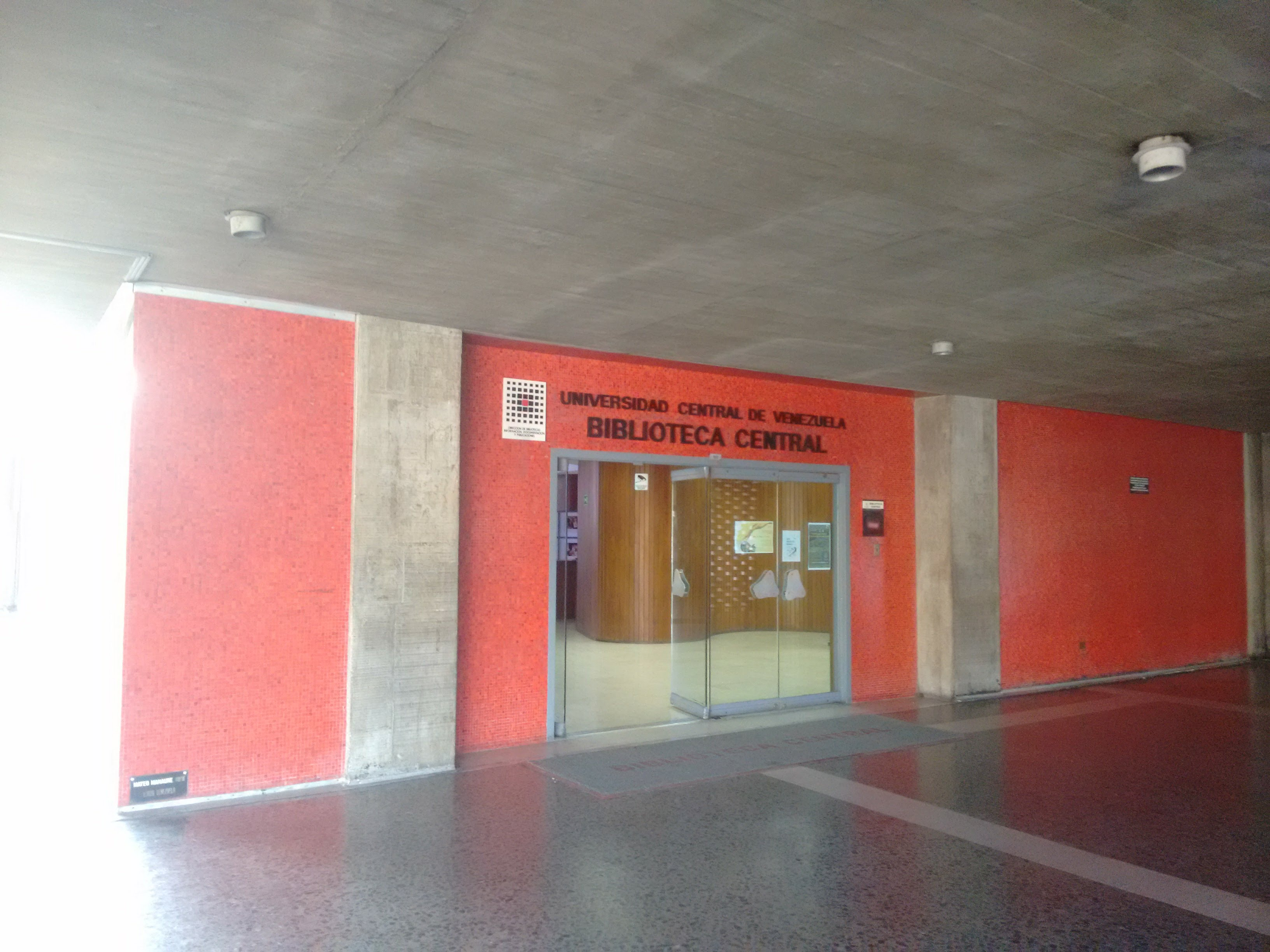
Untitled mural, 1954, Biblioteca central (Plaza Cubierta)

=== Hospital murals ===
On the far south wall of the seventh floor terrace of the University Hospital is a large mural by Manaure, featuring simple geometric shapes in different colors; seven similar murals adorn the hospital lobby, and Manaure designed the hospital facade. In addition, he created ventilation elements of the hospital lobby.

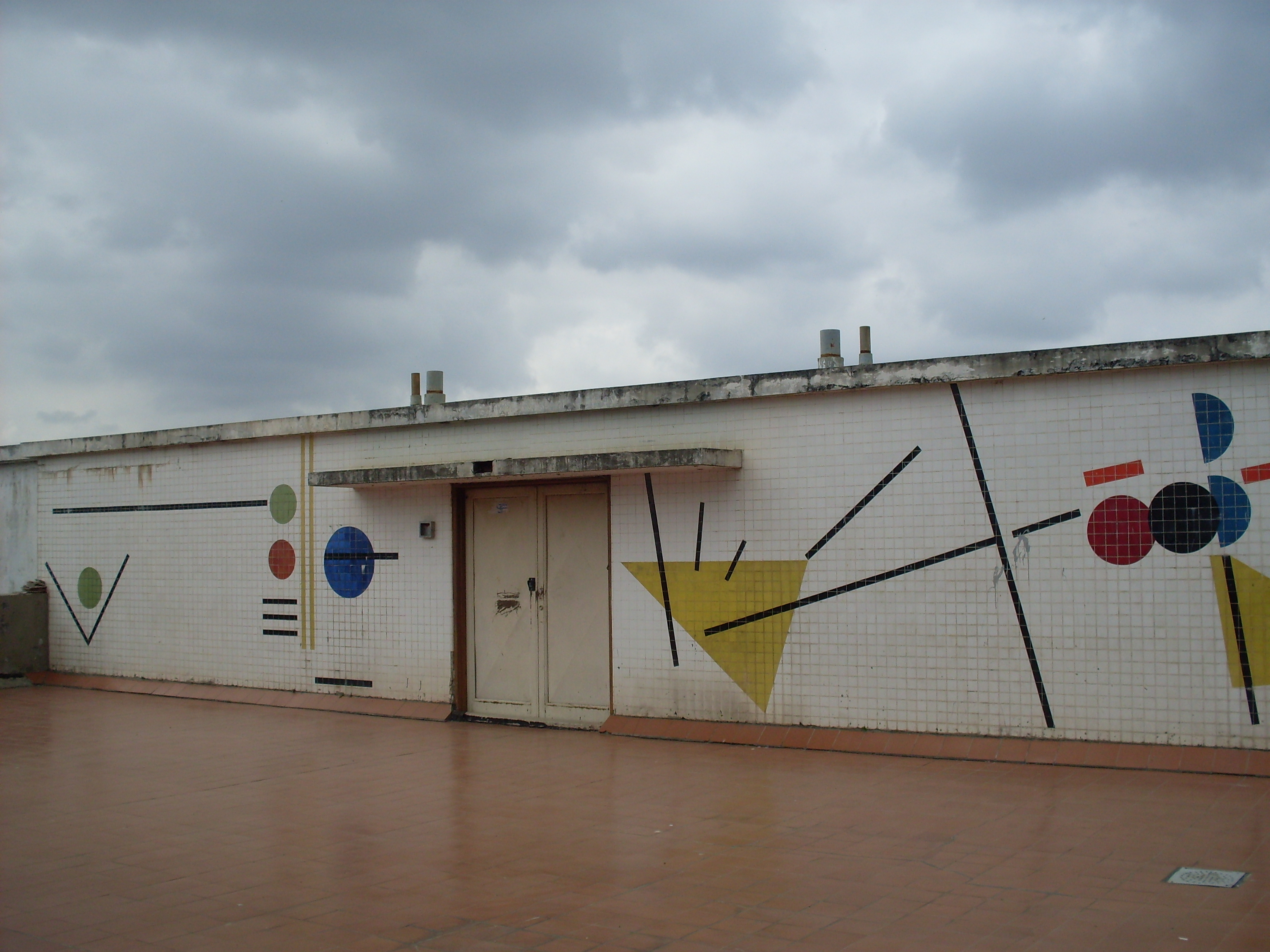
Untitled mural, 1954, Hospital Clínico Universitario

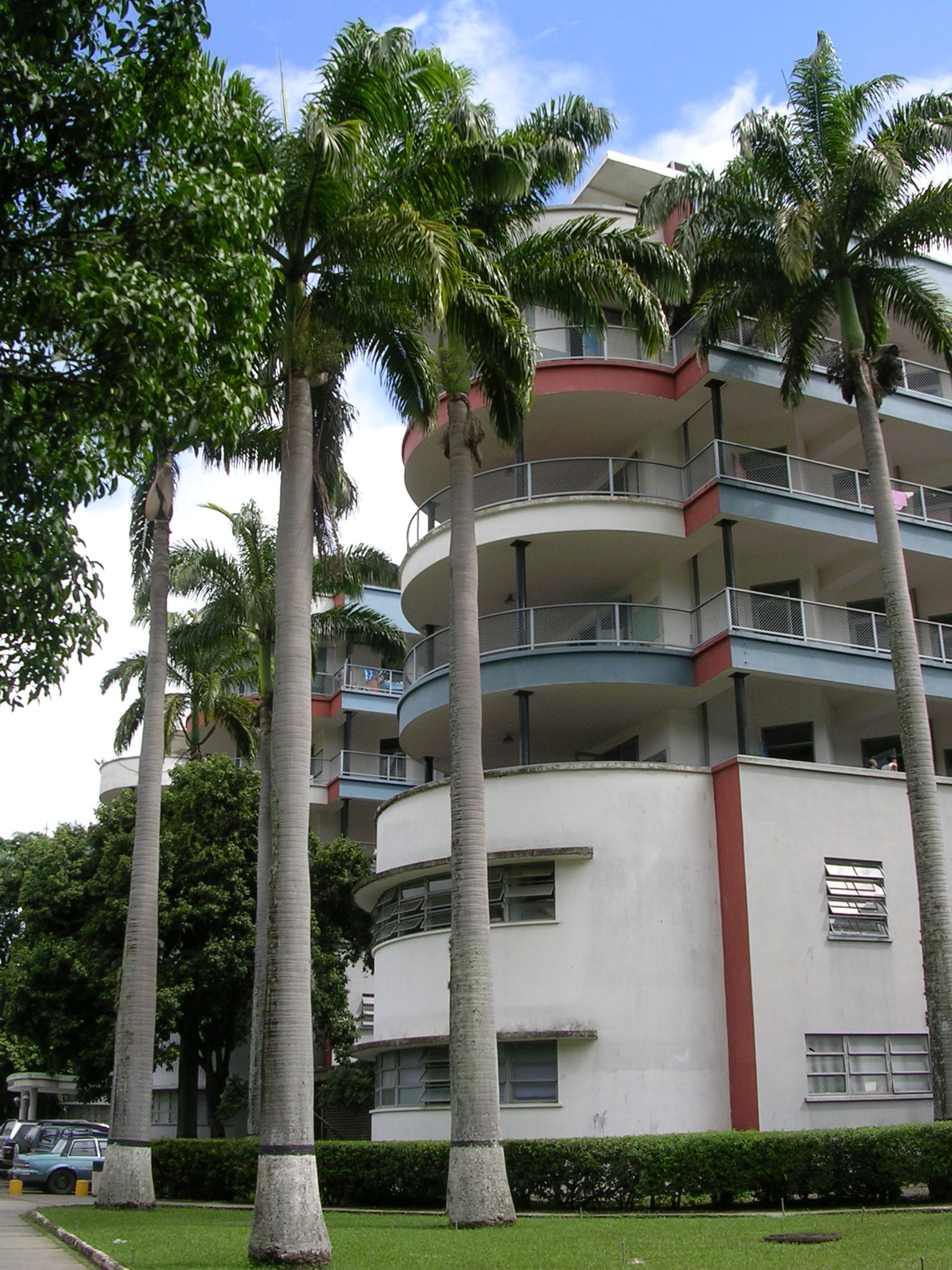
Part of the facade of the Hospital Clínico Universitario, 1954, photographed in 2008

=== Faculty of Engineering murals ===
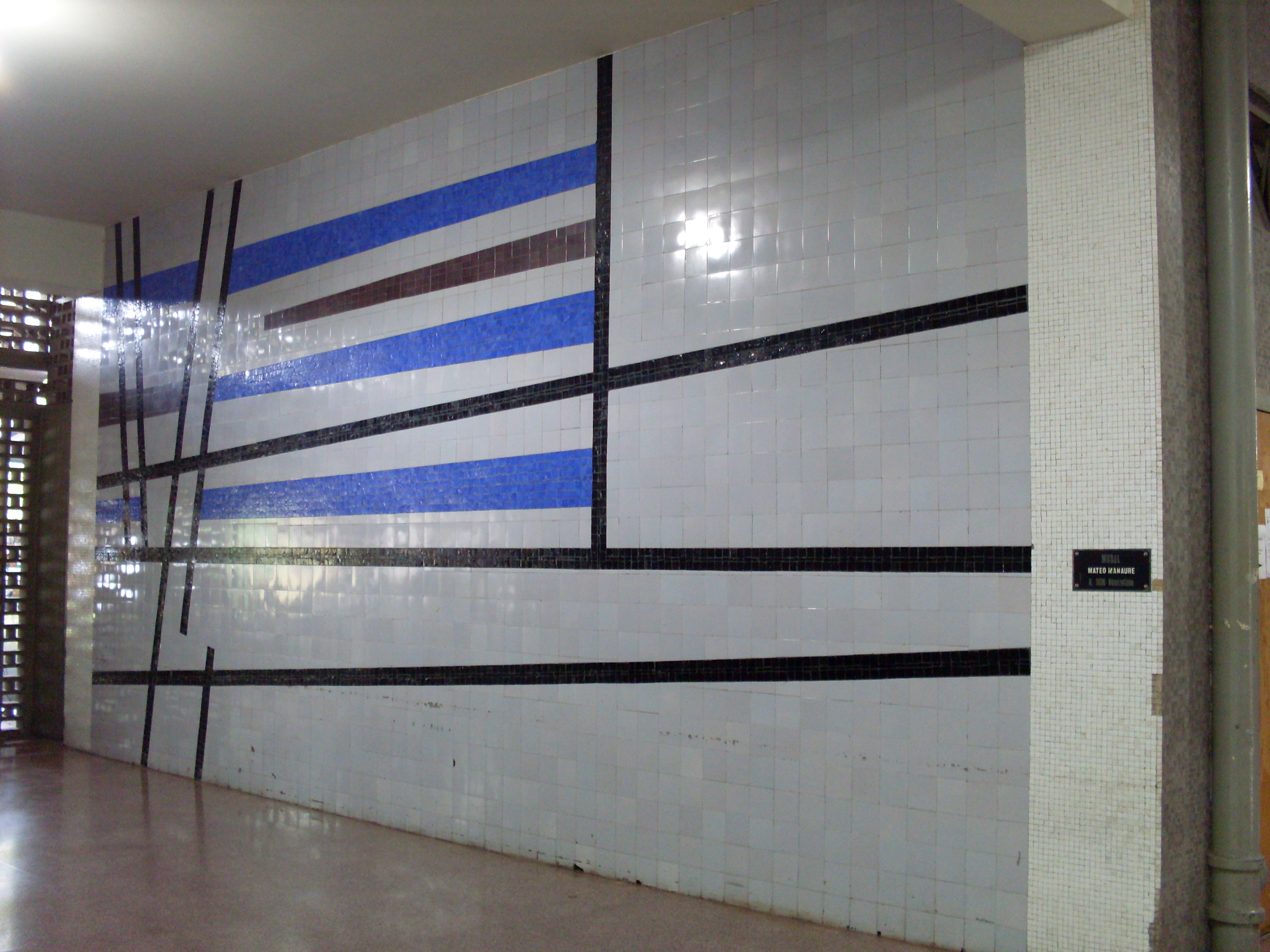
Untitled mural, 1954, east wall of the main entrance to the Faculty of Engineering

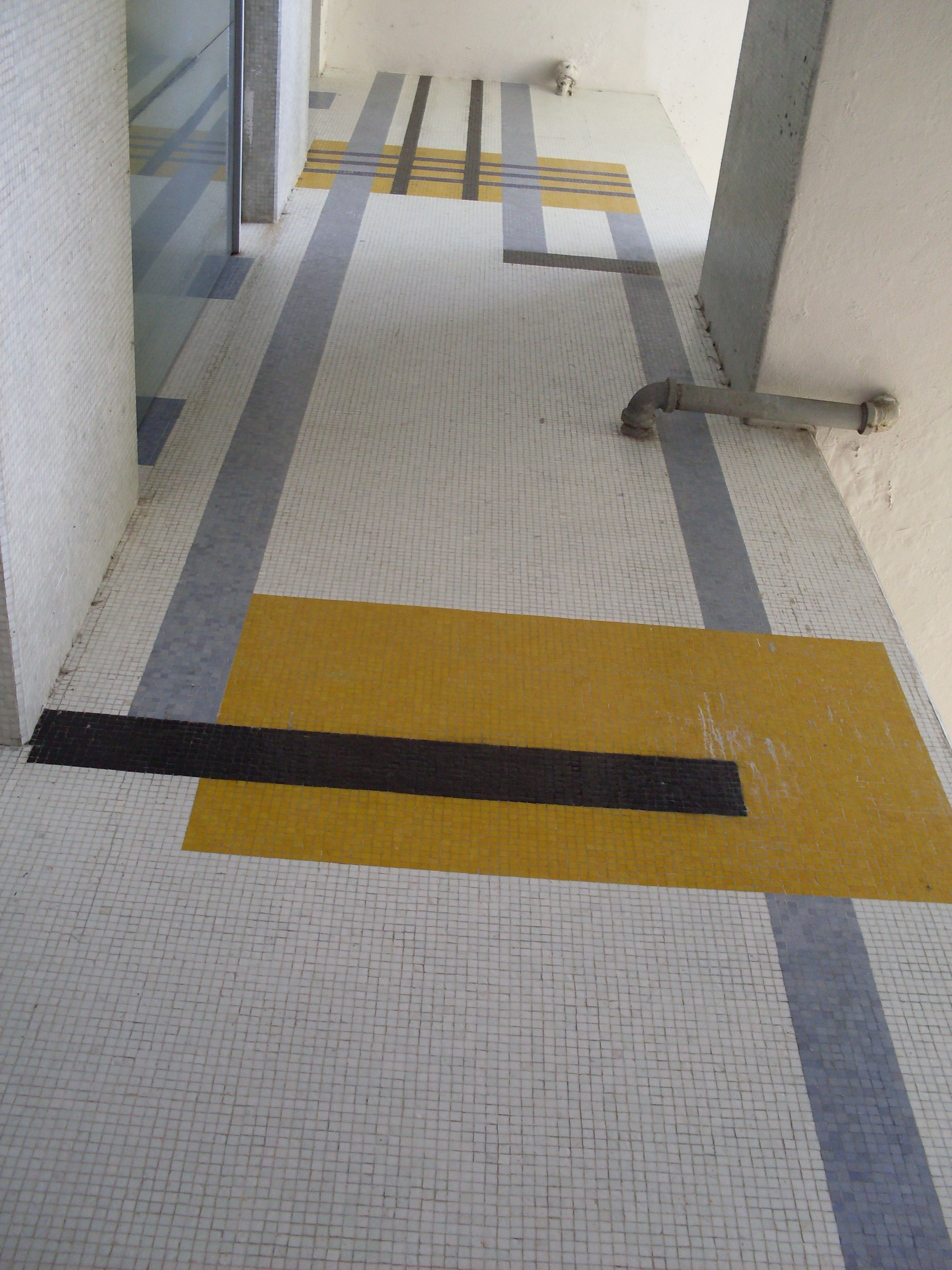
Untitle mural, 1954, external east wall of the main entrance to the Faculty of Engineering

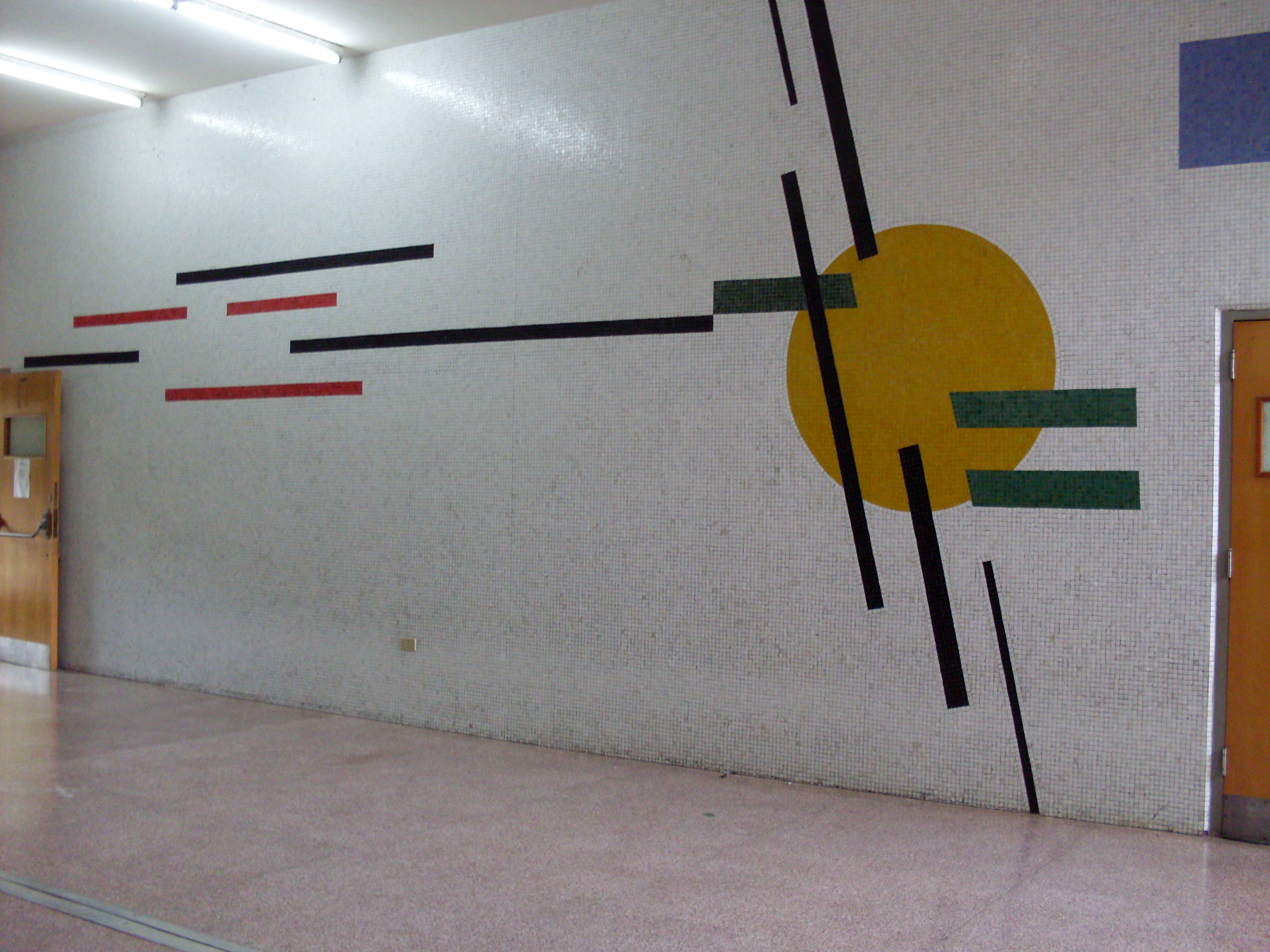
Untitled mural (ground floor), 1954, east entrance to the Faculty of Engineering

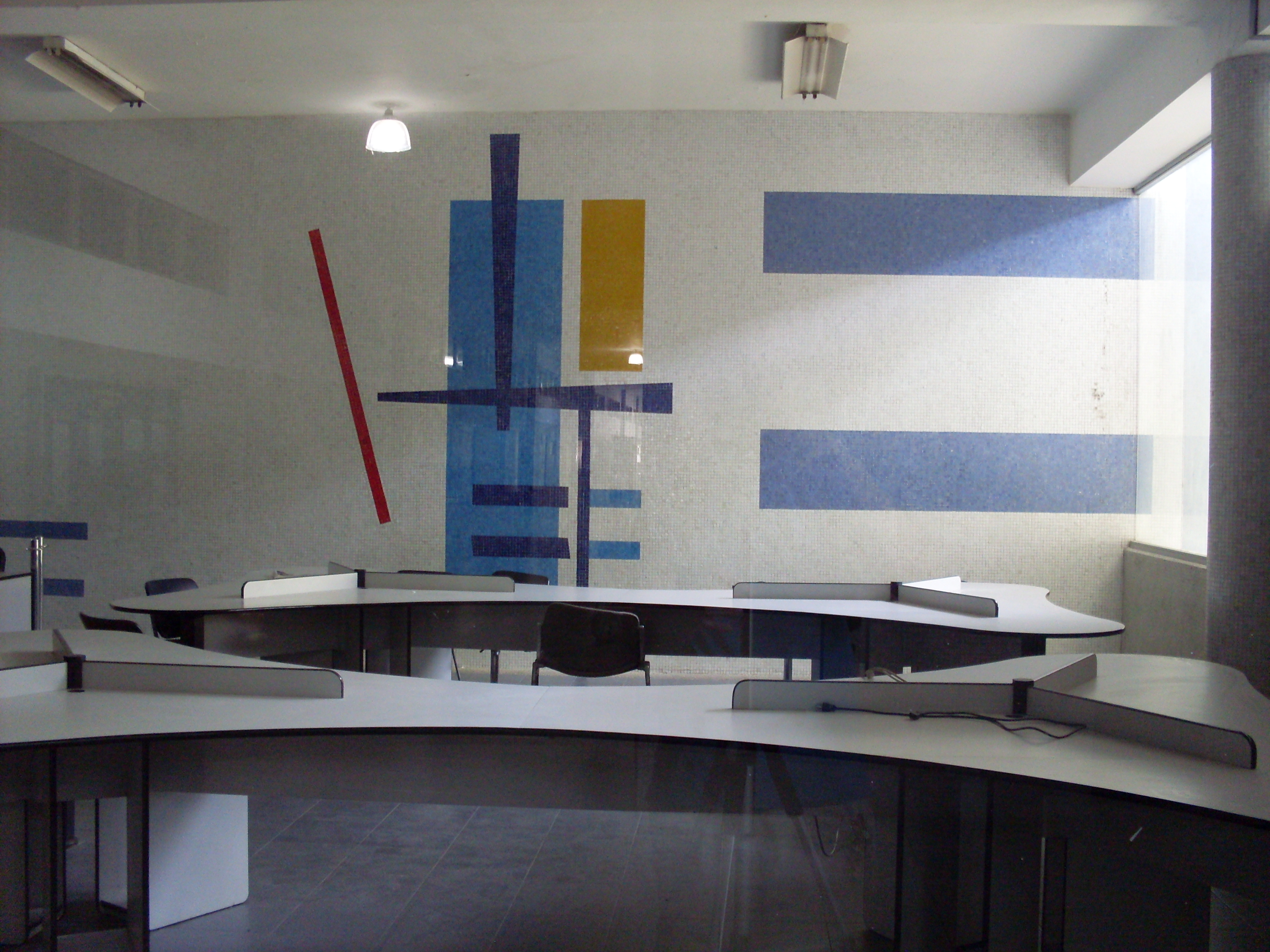
Untitled mural (first floor), 1954, above the east entrance to the Faculty of Engineering

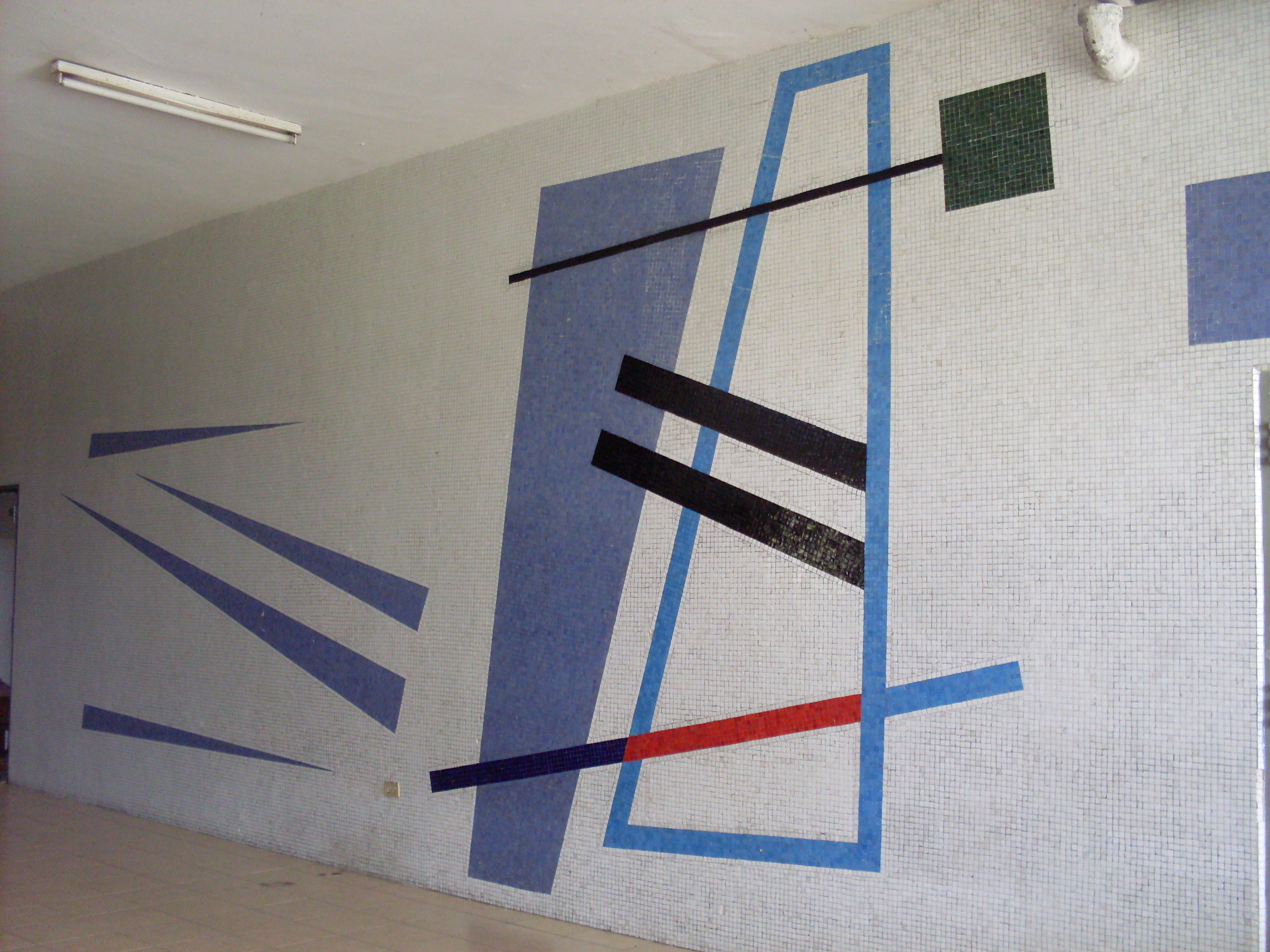
Untitled mural (second floor), 1954, above the east entrance to the Faculty of Engineering

=== La pared de ciencias ===
Year: 1955

The former Escuela Técnica Industrial (Technical College) is located in the southwest of the campus and was designed by Villanueva as a separate but connected institution between 1946 and 1949. It has since been integrated into the university and is home to the Faculty of Sciences. The mural known as La pared de ciencias was constructed in 1955, at the request of the government, and is located on a wall of the former Technical College. It was described by architecture scholar Sibyl Moholy-Nagy as "obsolete" and "brash"; she noted that when people visited the campus with Villanueva, he would "turn away with a pained expression". According to Moholy-Nagy, Villanueva himself said that it is "too loud, too coarse, unrelated and unproportioned to the building".

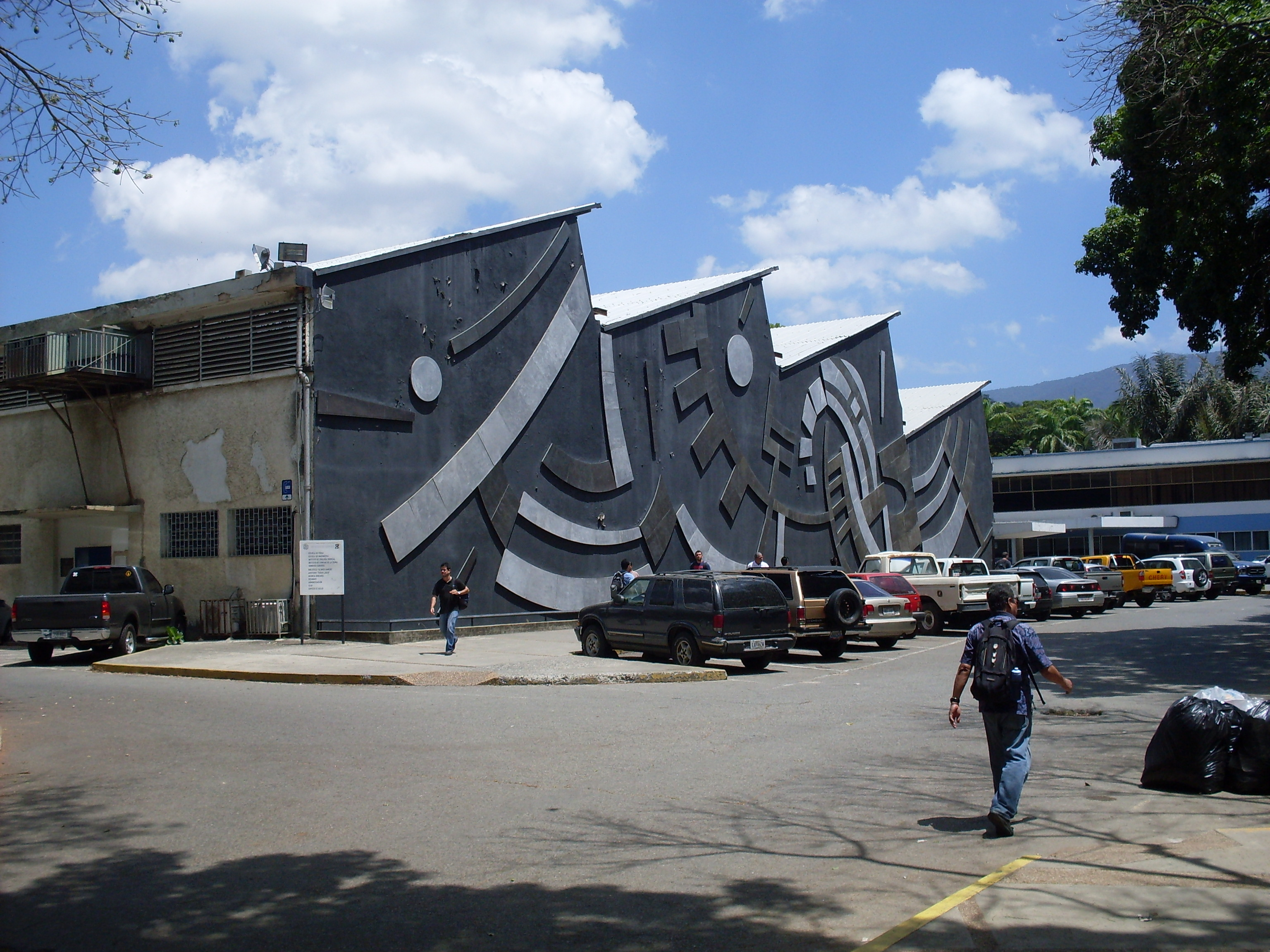
La pared de ciencias, 1955, Biblioteca Alonso Gamero

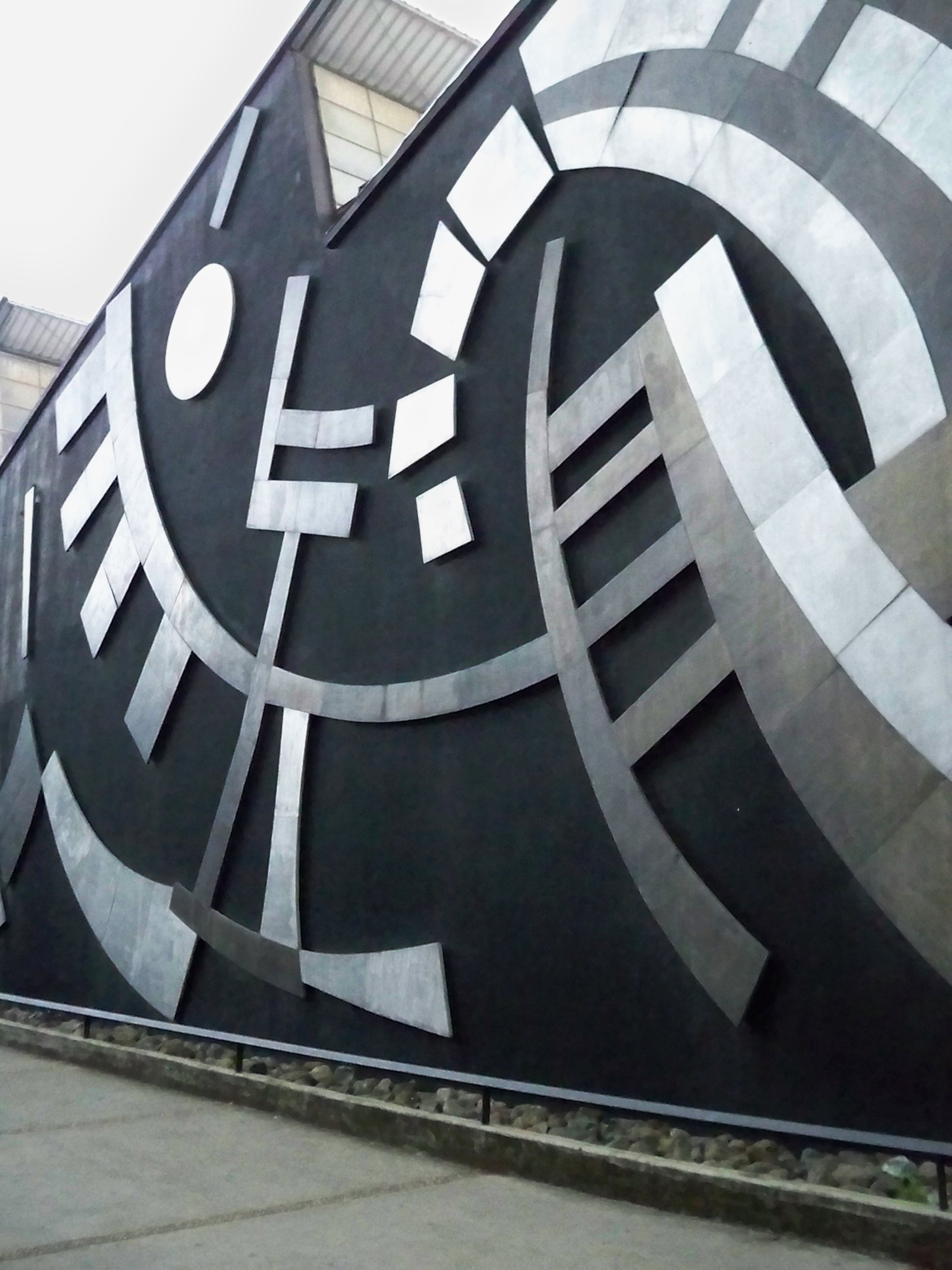
Detail of La pared de ciencias

=== Taller Galia murals ===
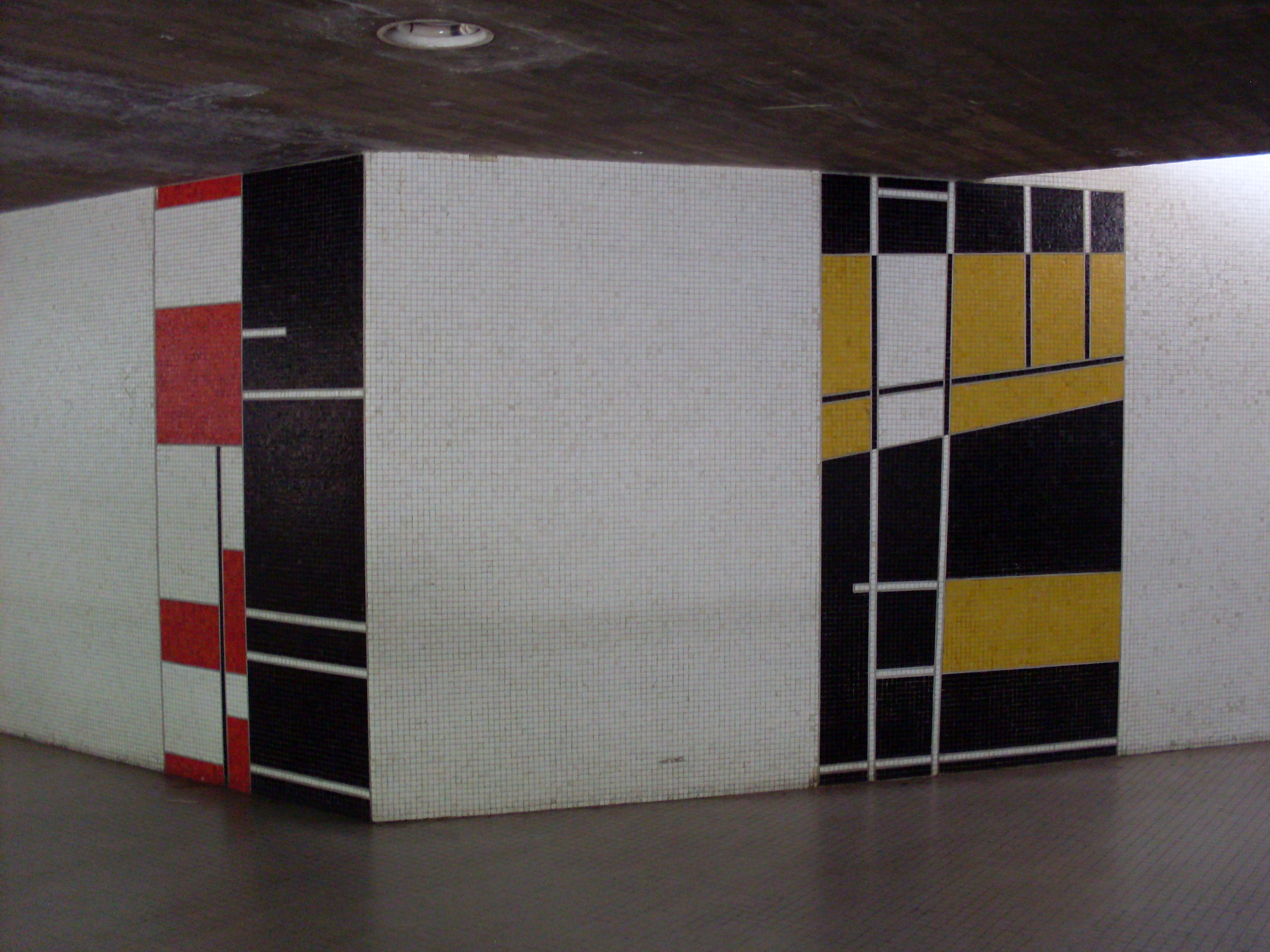
Untitled mural (wall 1), 1956, Taller Galia entrance

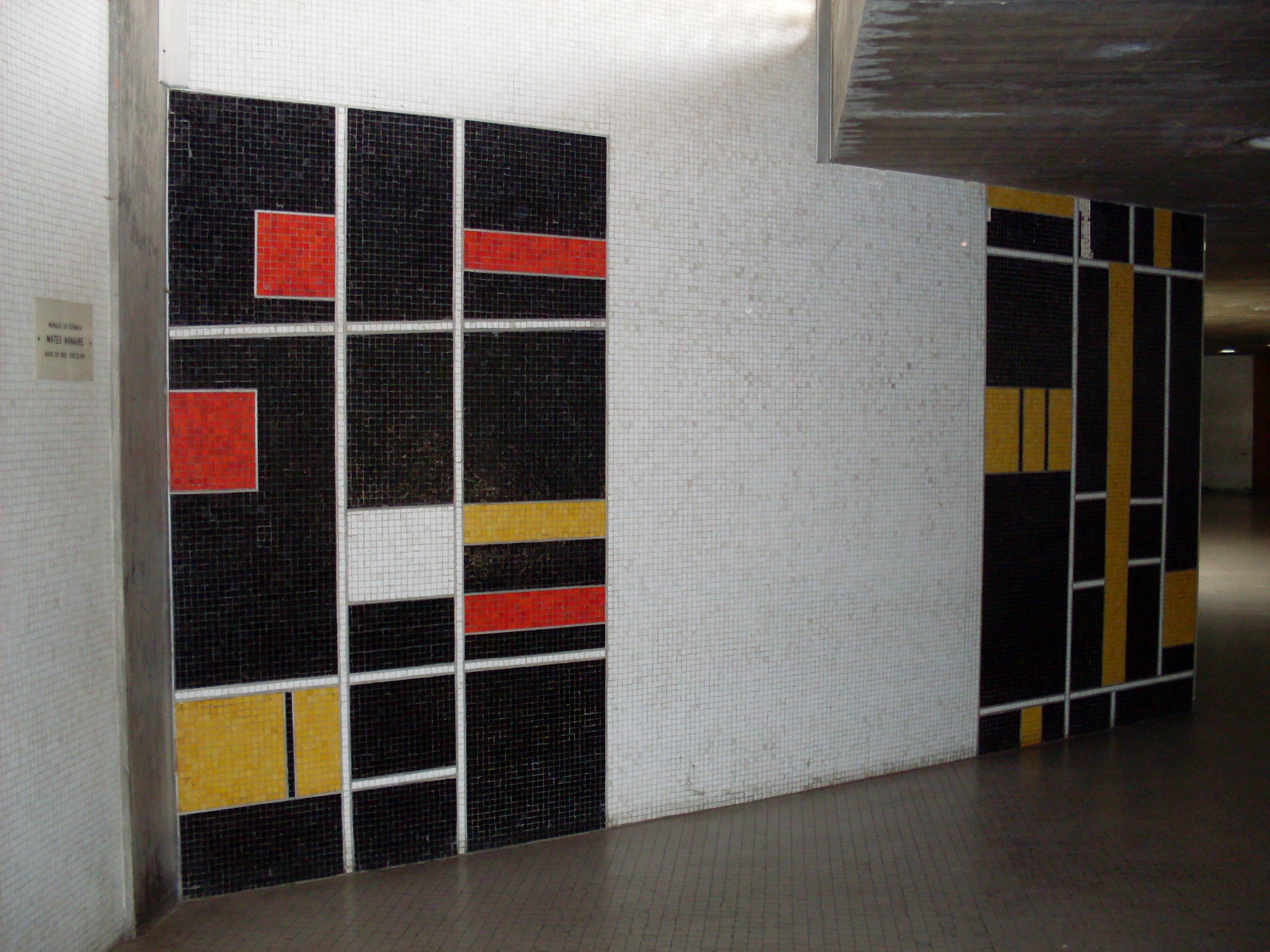
Untitled mural (wall 2), 1956, Taller Galia entrance

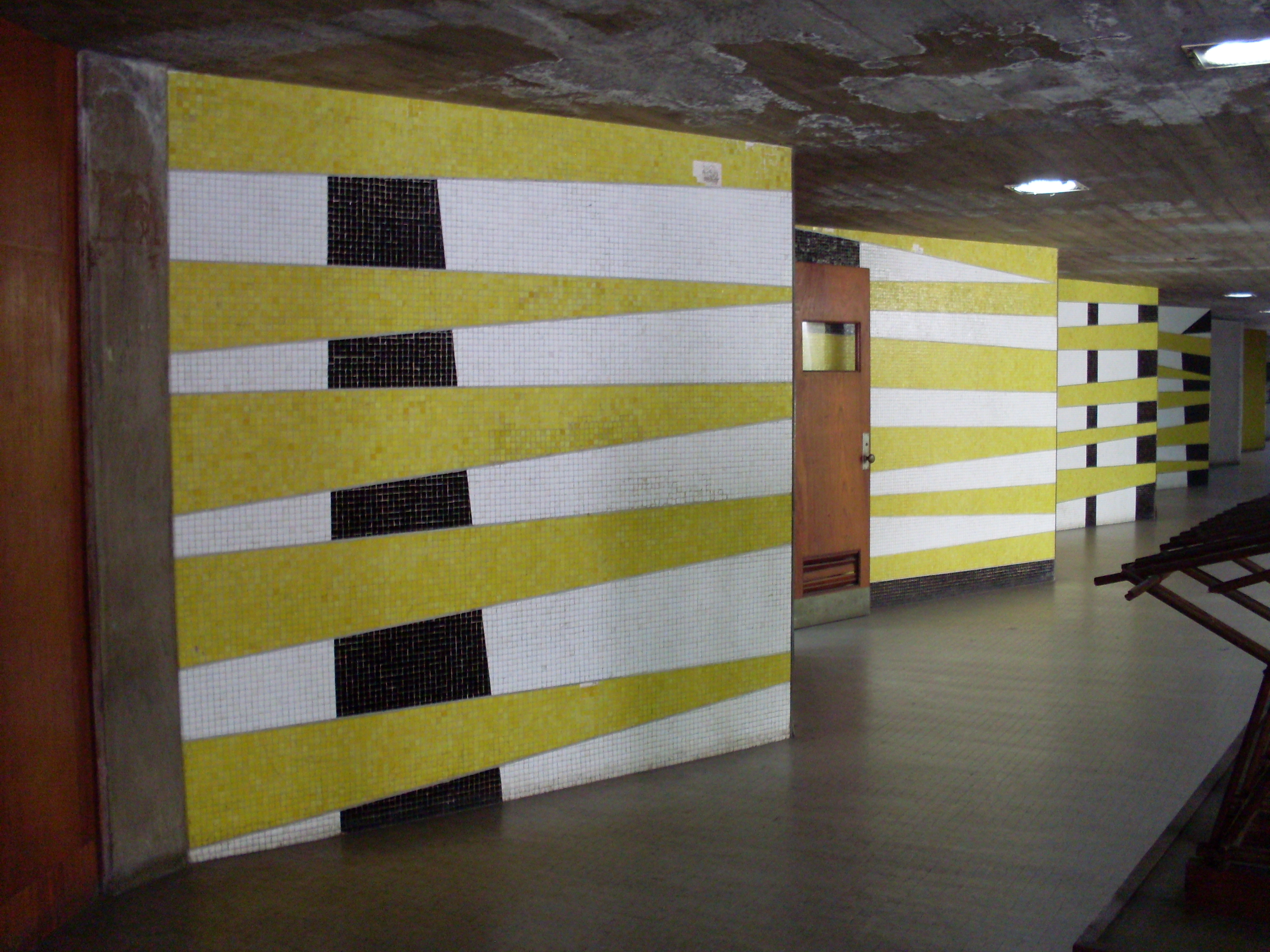
Untitled mural, 1956, Workshop hall

== Other works ==
=== Acoustic frames ===
In the Sala de Conciertos are two 1954 frames, on each side of the stage, to complement the acoustics of the hall. They are wooden and designed with slats that have colored stripes in the opposite direction. The frames are different shapes, with one measuring 138 cm × 240 cm (54 in × 94 in) and the other 228 cm × 260 cm (90 in × 102 in).

=== Stained-glass windows ===
Manaure designed two large stained-glass windows for the Paraninfo performance hall. Both were constructed in 1954, installed by Jean Barillet. They depict quadrilateral geometric shapes of different sizes in various colors. The window on the south facade measures 112 cm × 1,302 cm (44 in × 513 in), and the window on the east facade measures 536 cm × 668 cm (211 in × 263 in).

=== Construcción cromática ===
Construcción cromática was constructed in 1998 in the Facultad de Ciencias Económicas y Sociales (Faculty of Economic and Social Sciences; FaCES). It is different in style to Manaure's architectural artworks.

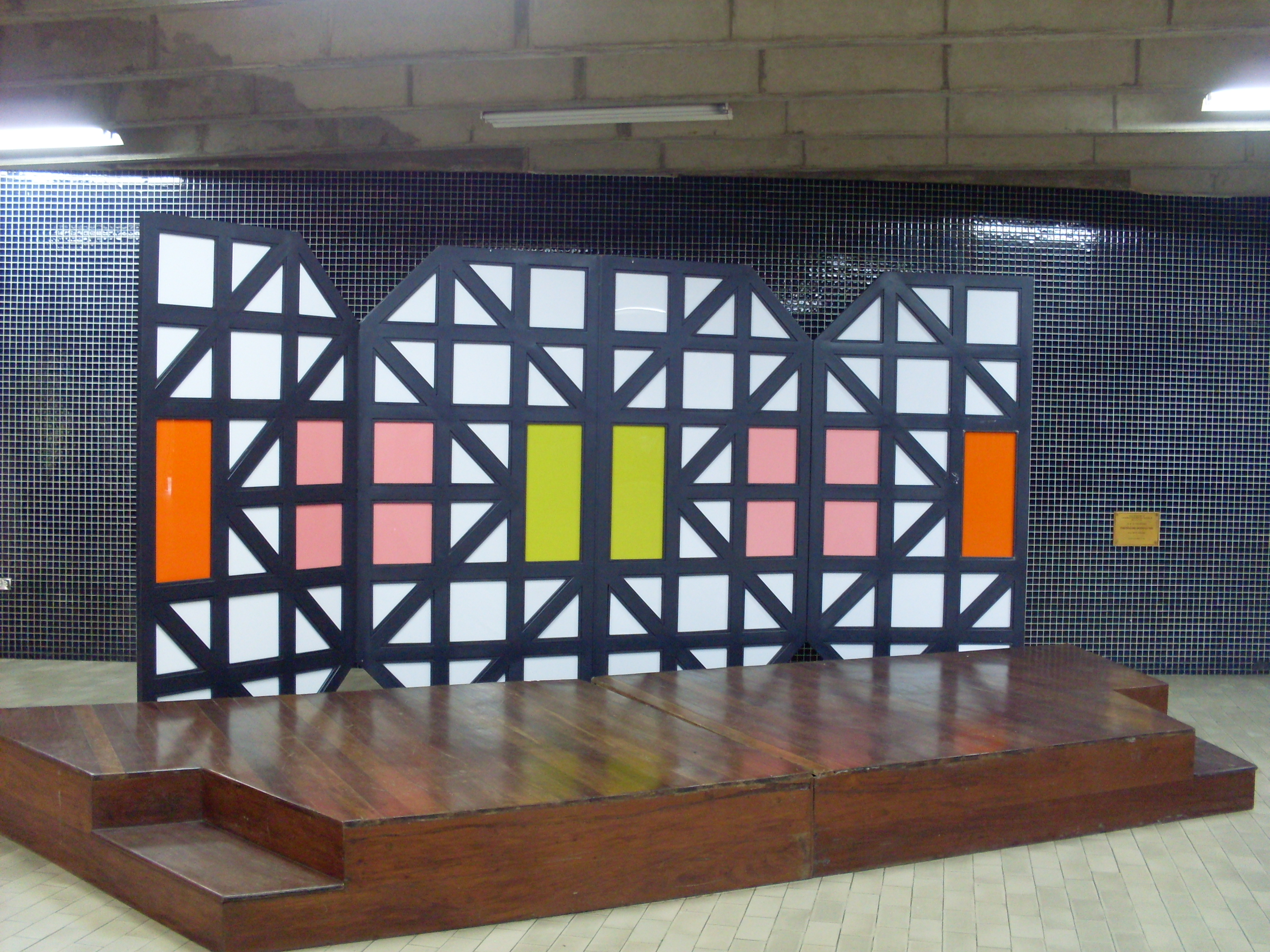
Construcción cromática, 1998, FaCES entrance hall

== See also ==
- List of artworks in University City of Caracas
