= Mateo Manaure =

Venezuelan modern artist (1926–2018)

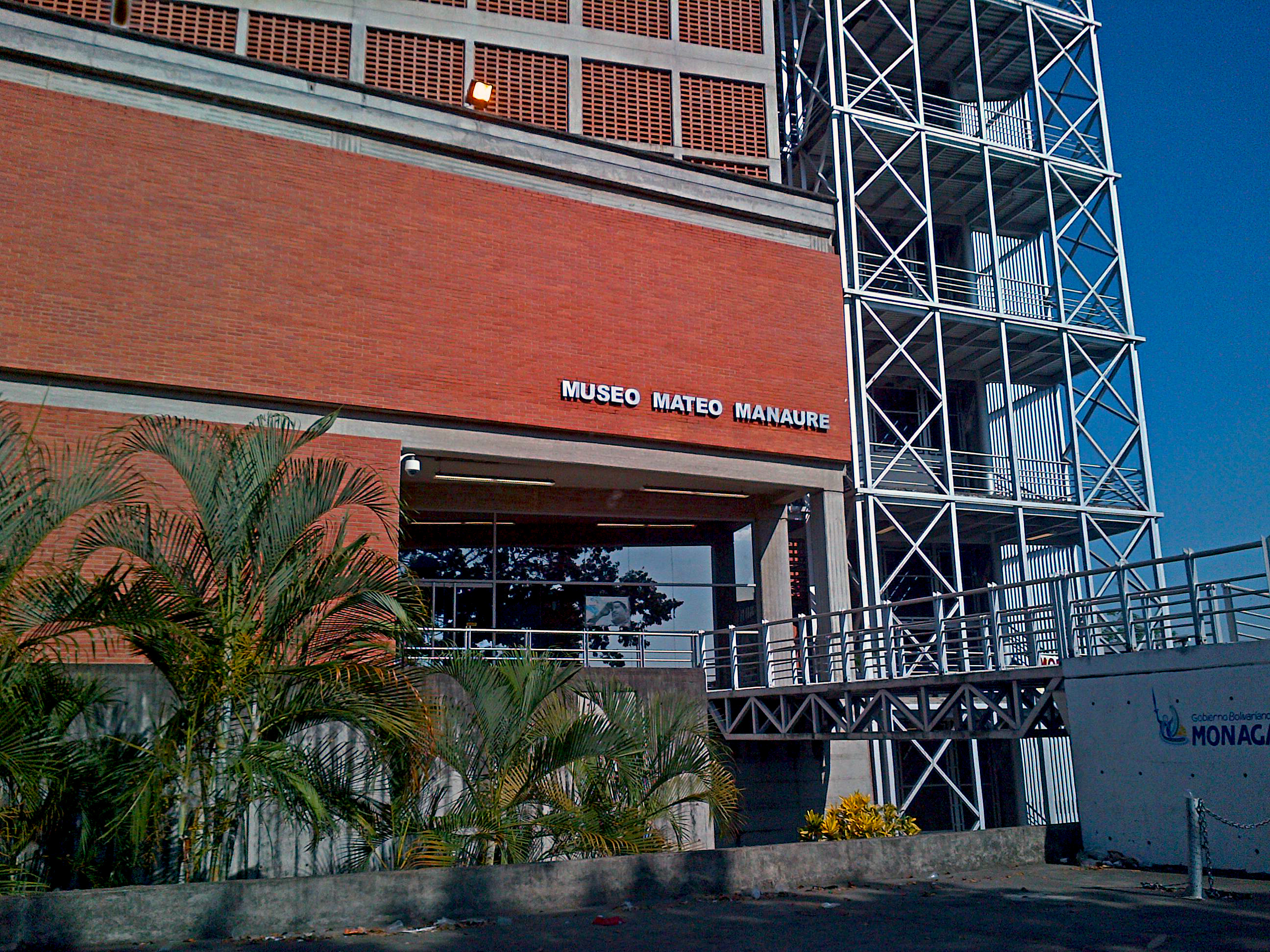
Museo Mateo Manaure

Mateo Manaure (18 October 1926 – 19 March 2018) was a Venezuelan modern artist. In Venezuela he is considered a master of abstractionism, and is known for his works in the University City of Caracas and for creating the largest glass mural in the world.

== Biography ==
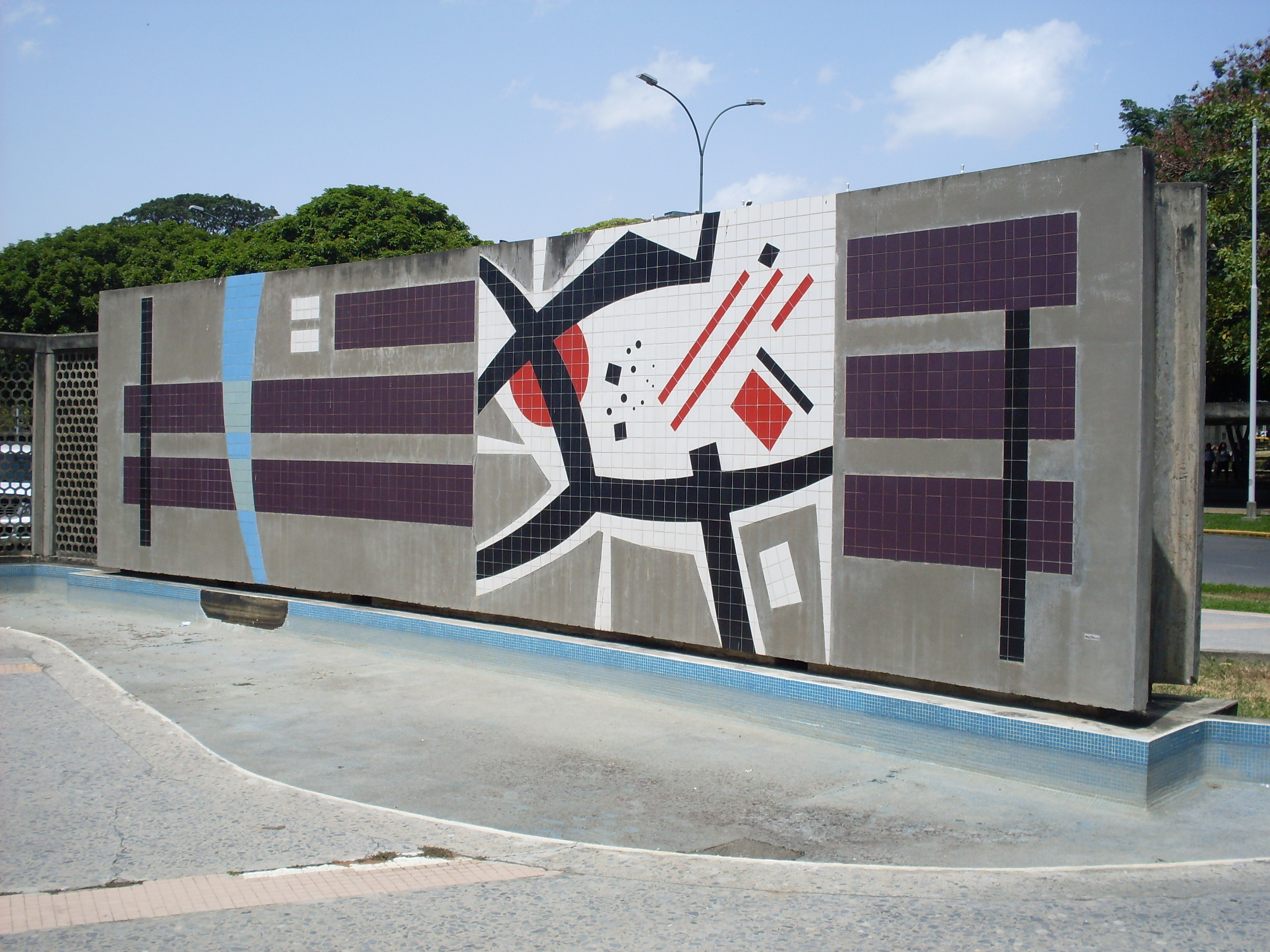
Mateo Manaure's bimural at the Central University of Venezuela.

Mateo Manaure was born on 18 October 1926 in Uracoa, in Monagas state. Between 1941 and 1946 he studied at the Escuela de Artes Plástics y Artes Aplicadas under the instruction of Antonio Edmundo Monsanto. Here, he studied graphic arts in the workshop of Pedro Ángel González, to whom he was an assistant. He also began participating in the artist salon of the Museo Bellas Artes in Caracas. In 1947 he won the inaugural National Prize for Plastic Arts and traveled to Paris. He made a trip back to Caracas the next year to work with the Taller Libre de Arte, before returning to Paris in 1950 and being involved with the artistic movement of Los disidentes.

He returned to Caracas in 1952 to found the Galería Cuatro Muros with Carlos González Bogan, and gave the first exhibition of abstract art in Venezuela. He also began collaborating with architect Carlos Raúl Villanueva, first on the University City of Caracas, to which he contributed 26 works of art and was "promoted" to art supervisor of the campus, and then to other public spaces like the redesign of the neighborhood of 23 de Enero.

For the next several years, Manaure continued to develop within abstract art, which made up the Venezuelan artistic avant-garde of that time. He later returned to more traditional graphic art forms, especially lithography, though still did some work in abstract expression. In 1984 he was named President of the Asociación Venezolana de Artistas Plásticos. In 2009 the Mateo Manaure Museum of Contemporary Art was opened in Maturín, Monagas. In 2016, the Museum of Modern Art in New York acquired his 1954 Project for Mural (Polychrome Columns) as a gift from Patricia Phelps de Cisneros through the museum's Latin American and Caribbean Fund.

Manaure died on 19 March 2018, in Caracas.

== See also ==
- Art of Mateo Manaure in University City of Caracas
