= Uracoa Municipality, Monagas =

Uracoa Municipality Municipio Uracoa
- Municipality
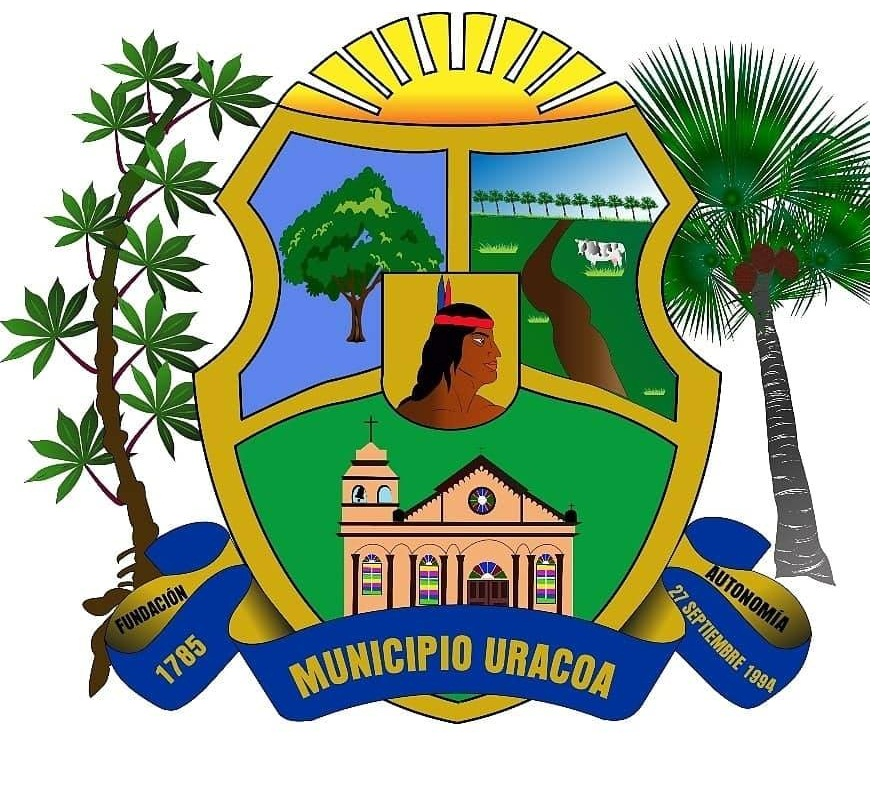
- Flag Coat of arms

- Location in Monagas

- Location in Venezuela
- Coordinates: 8°54′46″N 62°21′03″W
- Country: Venezuela
- State: Monagas

Government
  - Mayor: Eveling Martinez

Area
  - Total: 1,797.5 km^{2} (694.0 sq mi)
- Time zone: UTC−4 (VET)

Uracoa is one of the 13 municipalities of the state of Monagas, Venezuela. The municipality's capital is Uracoa.

== Geography ==
=== Climate ===
It has an annual average temperature of 27.1 °C and rainfall reaches 1,440 mm annual average.

== Economy ==
It is based on extensive ranching and small areas of forest.

In the last years in the municipality the oil and gas activity has increased.

== Culture ==
=== Cuisine ===
The gastronomy is represented by different typical dishes and sweets. The Carne en vara (meat in stick) are pieces of meat, seasoned with salt and pepper, the meat is set in wooden rods, type spears and are cooked in fathoms.

A sweet important in the region is the Majarete, a plate made of papelón and some species like cinnamon.

=== Public holidays ===
The festivities in honor of San Carlos Borromeo, between 2 and 6 November.

The municipality celebrates carnivals between February and March.

== Mayor ==
- Luis Rodríguez Vicuña. (2013—2017).
- Eveling Martinez (2021-2025).

== Notable natives ==
- Mateo Manaure, artist.
