= Narciso Debourg =

Venezuelan sculptor (1925–2022)

Narciso Debourg (14 March 1925 – 23 January 2022) was a Venezuelan sculptor who resided in Paris with his family.

Debourg was mainly known for creating visual structures using cylinders or solid geometric figures on a plane. He belonged to the Los Disidentes movement. He died on 23 January 2022, at the age of 96.

== See also ==
- Jesús Rafael Soto
- Alejandro Otero
