= Los disidentes =

Venezuelan-French artistic movement

The artistic movement known as Los Disidentes was founded in Paris in 1945, lasting until about 1950. It was composed of a group of Venezuelan artists.

== Artistic principles ==
The "Manifesto No" was the group's manifesto of artistic principles, which was written and published in Paris on 30 June 1950 by artists Rafael Zapata, Bernardo Chataing, Régulo Pérez, Guevara Moreno and Omar Carreño.

Major contributions to art from the group include beginning experiments in neo-figurative art, abstract art, and other waves of contemporary art; breaking away from figurativism, and renewing traditional Venezuelan painting marked by the trend of the El Círculo de Bellas Artes and the Landscape School of Caracas, which they were highly critical of.

== Works and activities ==
The group also published a magazine of the same name, which only had five editions. This publication served to show what was more radical art at the time: the so-called geometric abstractionism, as a rejection of traditional art forms.

== Members ==
Members included:

- Jesús Soto
- Alejandro Otero
- Mateo Manaure
- Narciso Debourg
- Pascual Navarro
- Alirio Oramas
- Perán Erminy
- Carlos Gonzáles Bogen
- Armando Barrios
- Genaro Moreno
- Nena Palacios
- Omar Carreño
- Dora Hersen
- Luis Guevara Moreno
- Aimée Battistini
- J. R. Guillent Pérez
- Rubén Núñez
- Miguel Arroyo
- Oswaldo Vigas
- Régulo Pérez

== See also ==
- Modern art
