= Bellas Artes station (Caracas) =

Caracas metro station

Bellas Artes
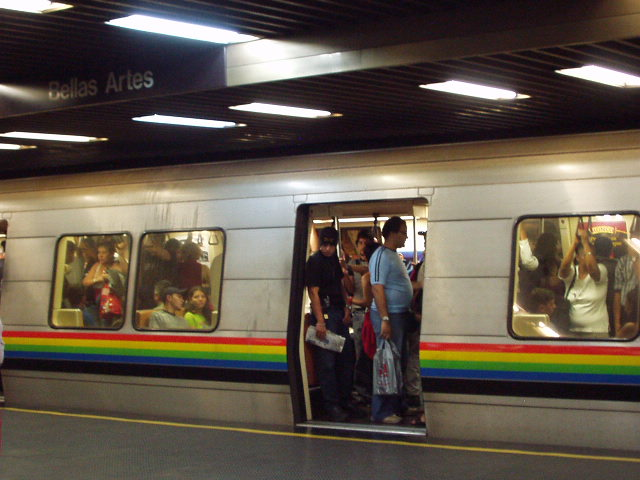
- Train at the station

General information
- Location: La Candelaria and San Agustín parishes, Municipio Libertador, Capital District; Venezuela
- Coordinates: 10°30′03.4″N 66°54′02″W
- System: Caracas Metro rapid transit station
- Operator: C.A. Metro de Caracas
- Line: Line 1
- Platforms: 1 island platform
- Tracks: 2

Construction
- Structure type: underground

History
- Opened: 27 March 1983

Services
Preceding station	Caracas Metro	Following station
Parque Carabobo toward Propatria	Line 1	Colegio de Ingenieros toward Palo Verde
Location

Bellas Artes is a Caracas Metro station on Line 1. It was opened on 27 March 1983 as part of the extension of Line 1 from La Hoyada to Chacaíto. The station is between Parque Carabobo and Colegio de Ingenieros.

The station is located next to the National Art Gallery, hence the name.
