= Altamira station =

Caracas metro station

Altamira
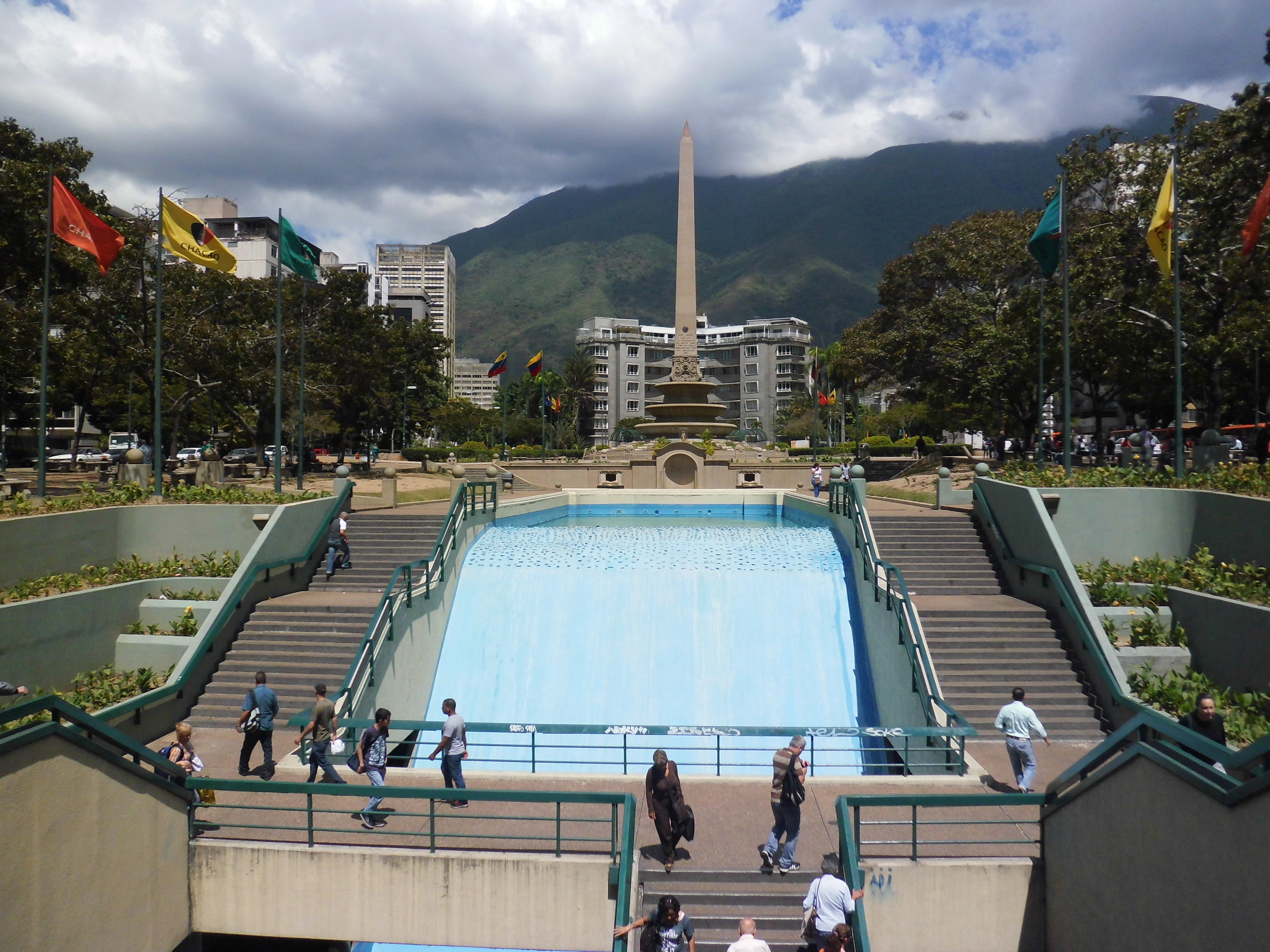
- Entrance to the station

General information
- Location: Chacao, Miranda; Venezuela
- Coordinates: 10°29′44.2″N 66°50′18.6″W
- System: Caracas Metro rapid transit station
- Operator: C.A. Metro de Caracas
- Line: Line 1
- Platforms: 1 island platform
- Tracks: 2

Construction
- Structure type: underground

History
- Opened: 23 April 1988

Services
| Preceding station | Caracas Metro | Following station |
|---|---|---|
| Chacao toward Propatria | Line 1 | Miranda toward Palo Verde |
Location

Altamira is a Caracas Metro station on Line 1. It was opened on 23 April 1988 as part of the extension of Line 1 from Chacaíto to Los Dos Caminos. The station is between Chacao and Miranda.

The name of the station originates from Altamira neighbourhood where it is located.
