= Miranda station (Caracas) =

Caracas metro station

Miranda
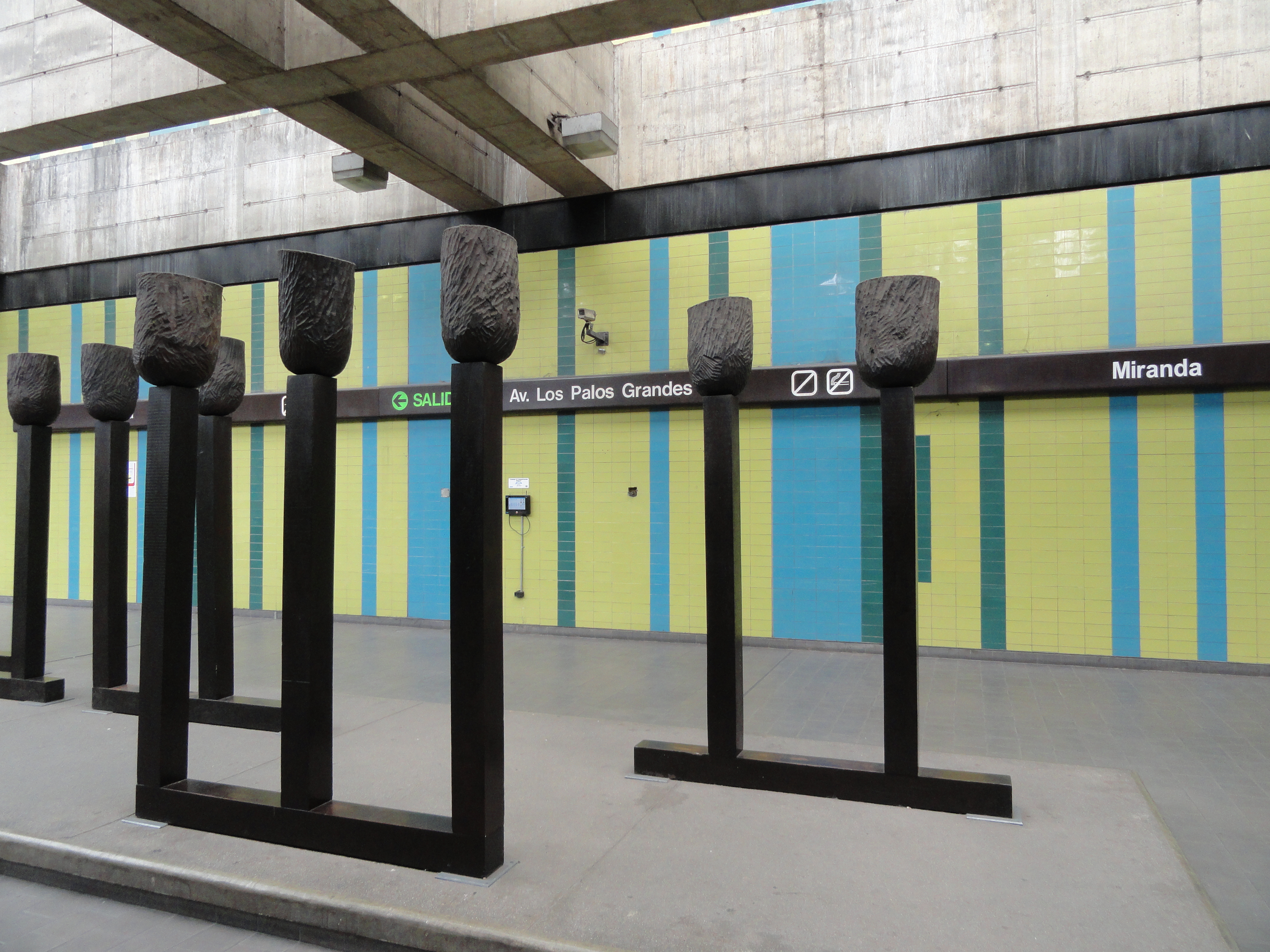
- Artwork in the mezzanine of the station

General information
- Location: Sucre, Miranda; Venezuela
- Coordinates: 10°29′49.9″N 66°50′26.6″W
- System: Caracas Metro rapid transit station
- Operator: C.A. Metro de Caracas
- Line: Line 1
- Distance: 1 island platform
- Platforms: 2

Construction
- Structure type: underground

History
- Opened: 23 April 1988

Services
Preceding station	Caracas Metro	Following station
Altamira toward Propatria	Line 1	Los Dos Caminos toward Palo Verde
Location

Miranda (formerly Parque del Este) is a Caracas Metro station on Line 1. It was opened on 23 April 1988 as part of the extension of Line 1 from Chacaíto to Los Dos Caminos. The station is between Altamira and Los Dos Caminos.

The station was renamed in 2008 to honor the Venezuelan national hero Francisco de Miranda.
