= Colegio de Ingenieros station =

Caracas metro station

Colegio de Ingenieros
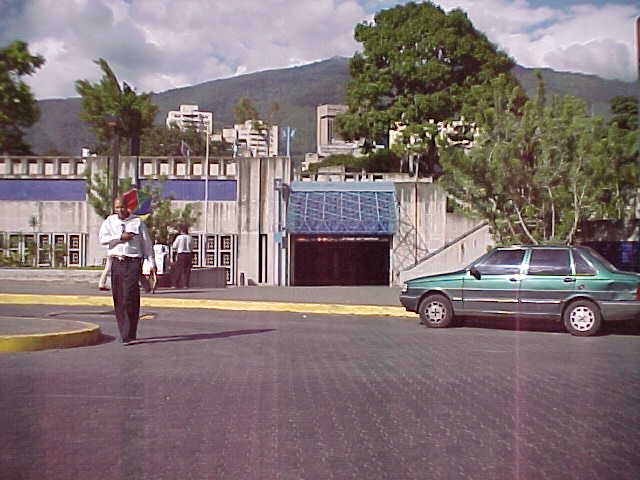
- Entrance to the station

General information
- Location: El Recreo parish, Municipio; Libertador, Capital District; Venezuela
- Coordinates: 10°30′04.9″N 66°53′32.9″W
- System: Caracas Metro rapid transit station
- Operator: C.A. Metro de Caracas
- Line: Line 1
- Platforms: 2 side platforms
- Tracks: 2

Construction
- Structure type: underground

History
- Opened: 27 March 1983

Services
Preceding station	Caracas Metro	Following station
Bellas Artes toward Propatria	Line 1	Plaza Venezuela toward Palo Verde
Location

Colegio de Ingenieros is a Caracas Metro station on Line 1. It was opened on 27 March 1983 as part of the extension of Line 1 from La Hoyada to Chacaíto. The station is between Bellas Artes and Plaza Venezuela.
