= Parque Carabobo station =

Caracas metro station

Parque Carabobo
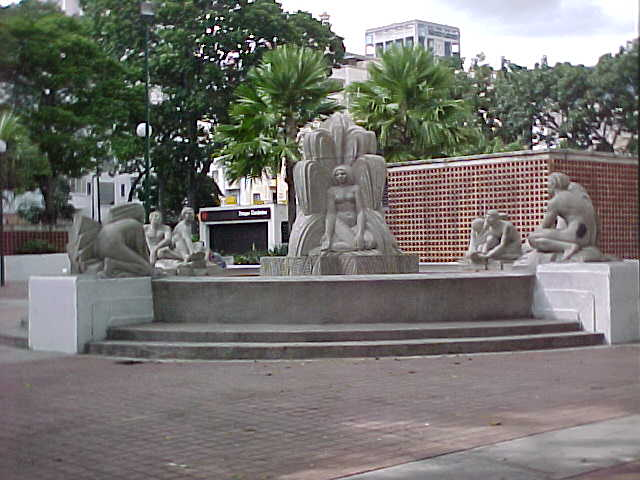
- Station entrance

General information
- Location: La Candelaria parish, Municipio; Libertador, Capital District; Venezuela
- Coordinates: 10°30′09.2″N 66°54′22.2″W
- System: Caracas Metro rapid transit station
- Operator: C.A. Metro de Caracas
- Line: Line 1
- Platforms: 1 island platform
- Tracks: 2

Construction
- Structure type: underground

History
- Opened: 27 March 1983

Services
Preceding station	Caracas Metro	Following station
La Hoyada toward Propatria	Line 1	Bellas Artes toward Palo Verde
Location

Parque Carabobo is a Caracas Metro station on Line 1. It was opened on 27 March 1983 as part of the extension of Line 1 from La Hoyada to Chacaíto. The station is between La Hoyada and Bellas Artes.
