= List of shopping malls in Venezuela =

This is a list of shopping malls in Venezuela.

== Capital District ==
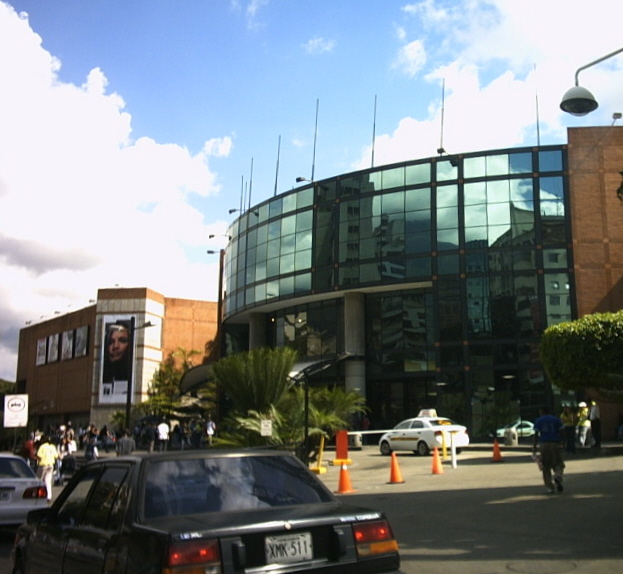
Sambil Shopping Center in the Chacao Municipality of Caracas

- Centro Sambil
- Centro San Ignacio
- C.C. Prado de María
- Centro Ciudad Comercial Tamanaco
- Centro Comercial Concresa
- Centro Comercial El Tolón
- Centro Comercial El Valle
- Centro Comercial Plaza Las Américas
- City Market Shopping Mall
- El Recreo Shopping Mall
- Paseo Las Mercedes
- Pasaje Zingg

== Falcón ==
- Sambil Paraguaná

== Mérida ==
- C.C. Artema

== Trujillo ==
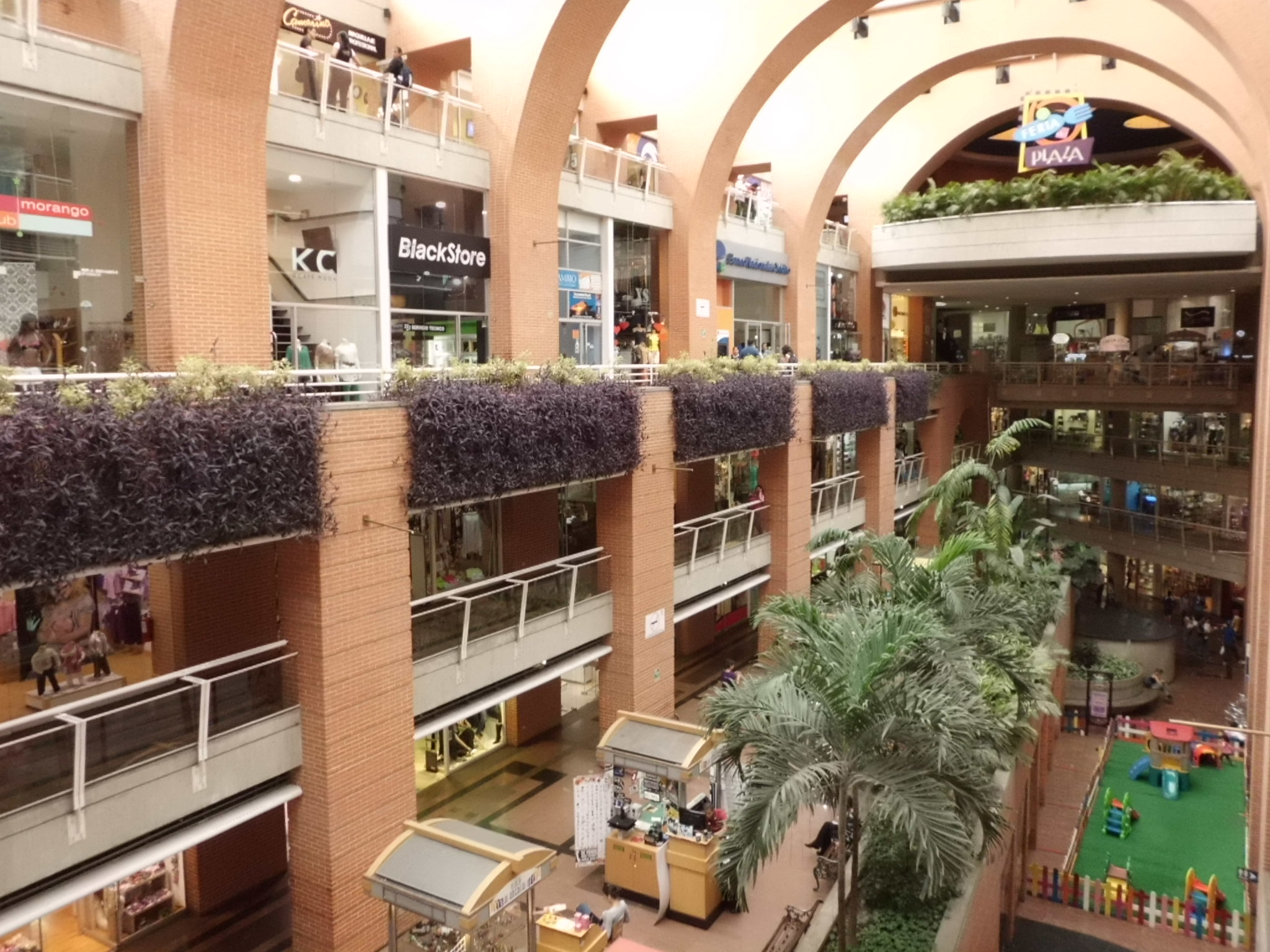
Centro Comercial Plaza Las Américas II

- Almacenes Maldonado
