= Los Cortijos station =

Caracas metro station

Los Cortijos
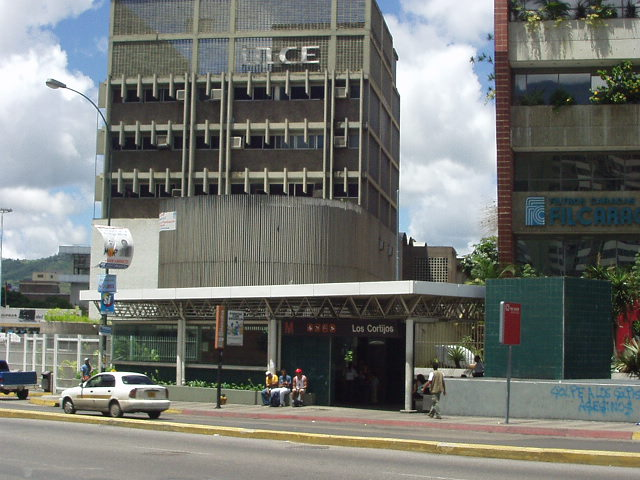
- Station in 2004

General information
- Location: Sucre, Miranda; Venezuela
- Coordinates: 10°29′19.3″N 66°49′31.2″W
- System: Caracas Metro rapid transit station
- Operator: C.A. Metro de Caracas
- Line: Line 1
- Platforms: 1 island platform
- Tracks: 2

Construction
- Structure type: underground

History
- Opened: 10 November 1989

Services
Preceding station	Caracas Metro	Following station
Los Dos Caminos toward Propatria	Line 1	La California toward Palo Verde
Location

Los Cortijos is a Caracas Metro station on Line 1. It was opened on 10 November 1989 as part of the extension of Line 1 from Los Dos Caminos to Palo Verde. The station is between Los Dos Caminos and La California.
