= Guaire miners =

Venezuelan people who search for metals in the Guaire River

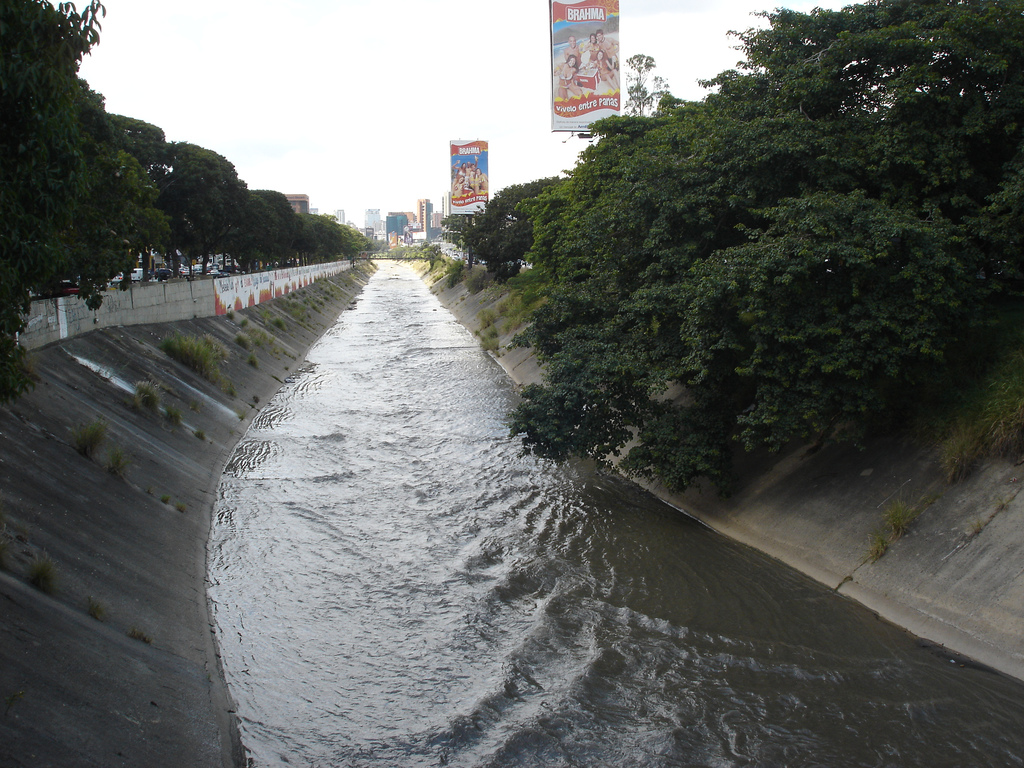
The Guaire River seen from the Veracruz bridge in Las Mercedes, Caracas.

The Guaire River Miners, also known as Guaire River Garimpeiros, is the name given to the people who search for metals in the Guaire River, a 72-kilometer-long river in Caracas, Venezuela that is highly contaminated with sewage. The miners are mainly minors, homeless people or blue-collar workers who lost their jobs due to the shutdown of government works or whose salaries are not enough to subsist and do not want to resort to crime. Despite being a practice that dates back to at least 1994, as of 2016 the number of people engaged in this trade increased to dozens and even hundreds during the Venezuelan economic crisis, characterized by hyperinflation and shortages.

== History ==
Searching for metals in the Guaire River is a practice that has existed for decades in Caracas. In 1994, journalist Anna Vaccarella in the program "Alerta" broadcast by Radio Caracas Televisión showed how some Venezuelans living on the streets were engaged in this activity. However, during the crisis in Venezuela, the devaluation of wages and the shutdown of government construction work has forced more people to resort to mining, including people who are not homeless. Since 2016, dozens of people began to search for metals daily in the sewers, and at the busiest point of the waterway, in the Caño Amarillo sector, the presence of up to three hundred people has been reported.

The Guaire river crosses a large part of Caracas, where waste and garbage continuously flow. In 2005, during the government of President Hugo Chávez, a plan for its sanitation was organized in front of several regional leaders, and on 18 August he promised that "Next year I invite you all and you, Daniel Ortega, I invite you to bathe in the Guaire next year". Jacqueline Faría, then Minister of the Environment, was in charge of the project. In 2006, 772 billion bolivars were allocated for the work, and in 2007 Jacqueline Faría assured that although the cleaning of a river like the Guaire could take up to 15 years, the "revolutionary process" would deliver a clean river in 2014. As of July 2016, the Inter-American Development Bank invested US$83.6 million to clean up the Guaire River, and in the same year, the Parliamentary Commission of Administration and Services of the National Assembly, chaired by deputy Stalin González, along with the Commission of Environment and Natural Resources, denounced that US$ 77 million had been spent for the cleanup of the river, when the execution of the project was only 26%.

On 19 April 2017, during the Mother of All Marches in the 2017 Venezuelan protests, several opposition demonstrators had to cross the Guaire River to escape the tear gas used by security forces; a Twitter user asked Faría about the destination of the dollars directed to the sanitation project, to which she replied "They were fully invested, ask your people who took a good bath!". Her answer generated a large number of replies condemning the statement. According to Juan Bautista González, a professor at the Universidad Central de Venezuela who coordinated the social component of the Guaire River Sanitation Project from Catia to Quinta Crespo, US$ 14 billion had been invested in the recovery of the Guaire River, which were "stolen" according to him. As of 2018, the destination of the project's investment was unknown.

== Location and work ==
Although Caño Amarillo is one of the places most frequented by miners, their presence has also been reported in other places along the river, such as in the Lídice and Manicomio creeks, in Antímano (near the walkway of the Andrés Bello Catholic University), in Quinta Crespo, in Plaza Venezuela, behind the University Stadium and in the Central University of Venezuela, in Las Mercedes and Bello Monte, in La California Sur and El Llanito, in San Martín (after the Ayacucho Bridge), in El Paraíso, in Carapita and in Los Teques city.

The miners spend minutes and even hours searching and digging in the water for items such as rings, chains, brooches, charms and jewelry made of precious metals such as gold, silver or copper. They generally do not wear any protection, gloves or boots, and some even work without shirts or shoes, wearing only shorts, despite the diseases that can be contracted in the drainage. Between 2017 and 2018 the miners reported that daily they could earn between 100 000 up to 500 000 bolivars in pieces, or up to 19 million bolivars a week, much more than the minimum wage in Venezuela or the salary of employees such as laborers, bricklayers or painters. Metals are sold at the Mercado de los Corotos in Quinta Crespo or at Capitolio, where by March 2018 informal sellers were buying a gram of 18-karat gold for between 10 million and up to 15 million bolivars, and for a little less if the purchase is made in cash.

== Risks ==
According to José Félix Oletta, former Minister of Health, diseases such as cholera (a very severe infectious disease), leptospirosis and all water-borne diseases can be contracted in the Guaire river. He has said that all the negative agents of the digestive system are present in the Guaire, including salmonella and escherichia coli, as well as viruses of oral fecal transmission such as hepatitis A and protozoan parasites, warning that natural immunity is not acquired, that some of the diseases can develop several times and that infected persons can be carriers of the disease and affect others. According to infectologist Julio Castro, the bacteria in the river are rapidly contagious and can spread diseases, such as leptospirosis, viral hepatitis or tetanus.

Miners have reported stigmatization because of their trade, and have been mocked or prejudged as criminals. Some miners have also died when they were carried away by the current of the river.

Several police officers, according to the miners, including the security forces of the presidential Miraflores Palace, have searched, beaten and extorted the miners, stealing the pieces obtained in the Guaire, sometimes waiting for them in Capitolio when they go to sell the metals. Groups of miners are usually detained by the National Guard or the Bolivarian National Police.

== See also ==
- Economy of Venezuela
- Crisis in Venezuela
- Mining in Venezuela
- Pirquinero
