= Agua Salud station =

Caracas metro station

Agua Salud
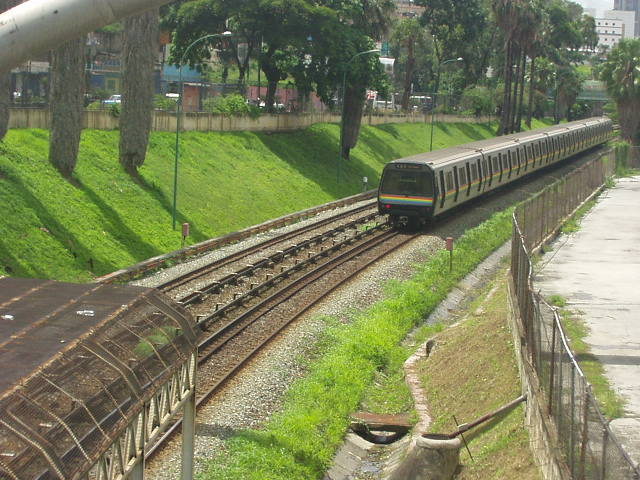
- A train approaching the station

General information
- Location: 23 de Enero parish, Municipio; Libertador, Capital District; Venezuela
- Coordinates: 10°30′48″N 66°55′50.9″W
- System: Caracas Metro rapid transit station
- Operator: C.A. Metro de Caracas
- Line: Line 1
- Platforms: 2 side platforms
- Tracks: 2

Construction
- Structure type: at grade

History
- Opened: 2 January 1983

Services
Preceding station	Caracas Metro	Following station
Gato Negro toward Propatria	Line 1	Caño Amarillo toward Palo Verde
Location

Agua Salud is a Caracas Metro station on Line 1. It was opened on 2 January 1983 as part of the inaugural section of Line 1 between Propatria and La Hoyada. The station is between Gato Negro and Caño Amarillo.

Agua Salud is one of the only two above ground stations of Line 1.
