= Petare station =

Caracas metro station

Petare
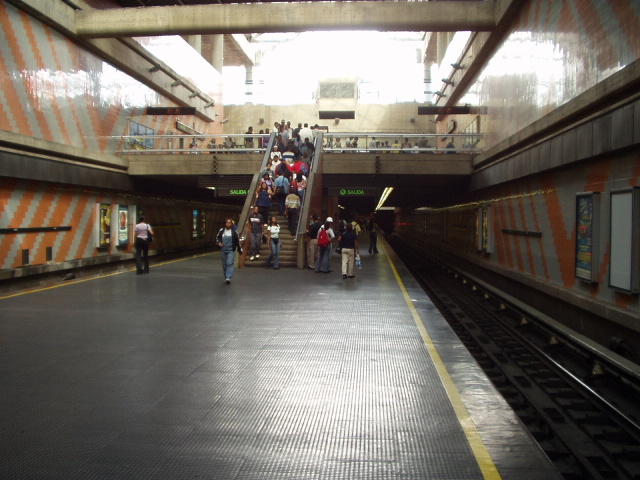
- The platforms

General information
- Location: Sucre, Miranda; Venezuela
- Coordinates: 10°28′43.5″N 66°48′28.2″W
- System: Caracas Metro rapid transit station
- Operator: C.A. Metro de Caracas
- Line: Line 1
- Platforms: 1 island platform
- Tracks: 2
- Connections: Cabletren Bolivariano

Construction
- Structure type: underground

History
- Opened: 10 November 1989

Services
Preceding station	Caracas Metro	Following station
La California toward Propatria	Line 1	Palo Verde Terminus
Location

Petare is a Caracas Metro station on Line 1. It was opened on 10 November 1989 as part of the extension of Line 1 from Los Dos Caminos to Palo Verde. The station is between La California and Palo Verde.

The station is located in the city of Petare.
