= Chacao station =

Caracas metro station

Chacao
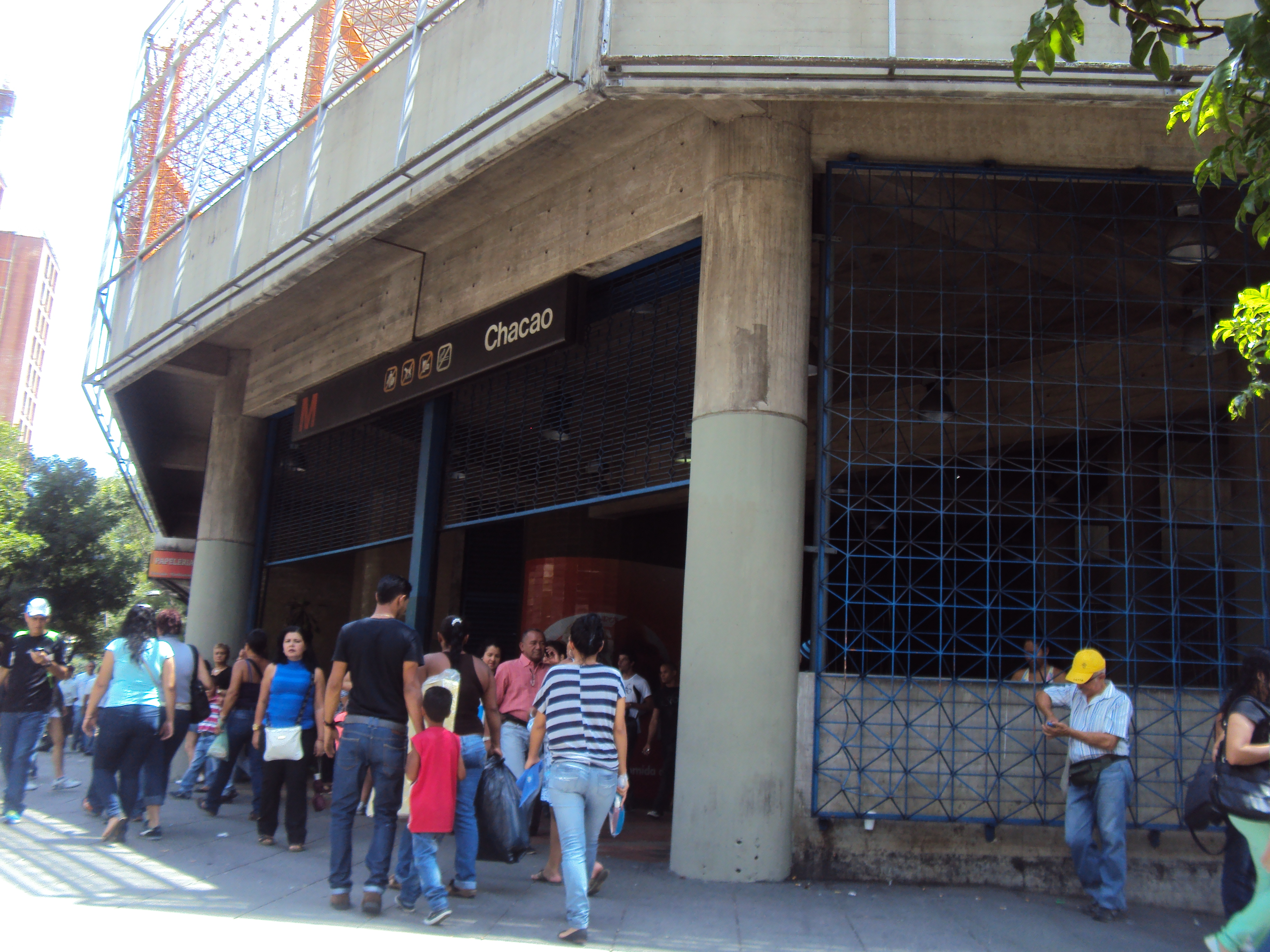
- Station in 2013

General information
- Location: Chacao, Miranda; Venezuela
- Coordinates: 10°29′33.3″N 66°51′18.6″W
- System: Caracas Metro rapid transit station
- Operator: C.A. Metro de Caracas
- Line: Line 1
- Platforms: 1 island platform
- Tracks: 2

Construction
- Structure type: underground

History
- Opened: 23 April 1988

Services
Preceding station	Caracas Metro	Following station
Chacaíto toward Propatria	Line 1	Altamira toward Palo Verde
Location

Chacao is a Caracas Metro station on Line 1. It was opened on 23 April 1988 as part of the extension of Line 1 from Chacaíto to Los Dos Caminos. The station is between Chacaíto and Altamira.

The station is located in Chacao Municipality, hence the name.
