= Gato Negro station =

Caracas metro station

Gato Negro
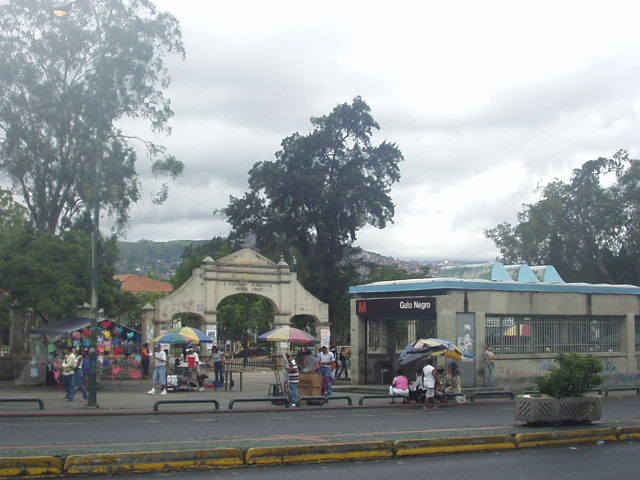
- Station in 2004

General information
- Location: Sucre parish, Municipio; Libertador, Capital District; Venezuela
- Coordinates: 10°30′56.6″N 66°56′31.2″W
- System: Caracas Metro rapid transit station
- Operator: C.A. Metro de Caracas
- Line: Line 1
- Platforms: 1 island platform
- Tracks: 2

Construction
- Structure type: underground

History
- Opened: 2 January 1983

Services
Preceding station	Caracas Metro	Following station
Plaza Sucre toward Propatria	Line 1	Agua Salud toward Palo Verde
Location

Gato Negro is a Caracas Metro station on Line 1. It was opened on 2 January 1983 as part of the inaugural section of Line 1 between Propatria and La Hoyada. The station is between Plaza Sucre and Agua Salud.
