= Pérez Bonalde station =

Caracas metro station

Pérez Bonalde
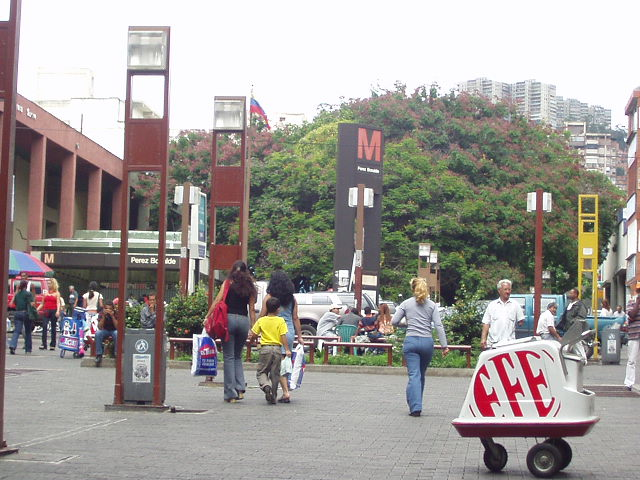
- Station entrance

General information
- Location: Sucre parish, Municipio; Libertador, Capital District; Venezuela
- Coordinates: 10°30′27.6″N 66°56′52.2″W
- System: Caracas Metro rapid transit station
- Operator: C.A. Metro de Caracas
- Line: Line 1
- Platforms: 1 island platform
- Tracks: 2

Construction
- Structure type: underground

History
- Opened: 2 January 1983

Services
Preceding station	Caracas Metro	Following station
Propatria Terminus	Line 1	Plaza Sucre toward Palo Verde
Location

Pérez Bonalde is a Caracas Metro station on Line 1. It was opened on 2 January 1983 as part of the inaugural section of Line 1 between Propatria and La Hoyada, and is on Catia Boulevard. The station is between Propatria and Plaza Sucre.

The station is named after Juan Antonio Pérez Bonalde, and a 1946 bust of him sits outside the entrance to the station.
