= William Phelps Ornithological Collection =

William Phelps Ornithological Museum (William Phelps Ornithological Collection)
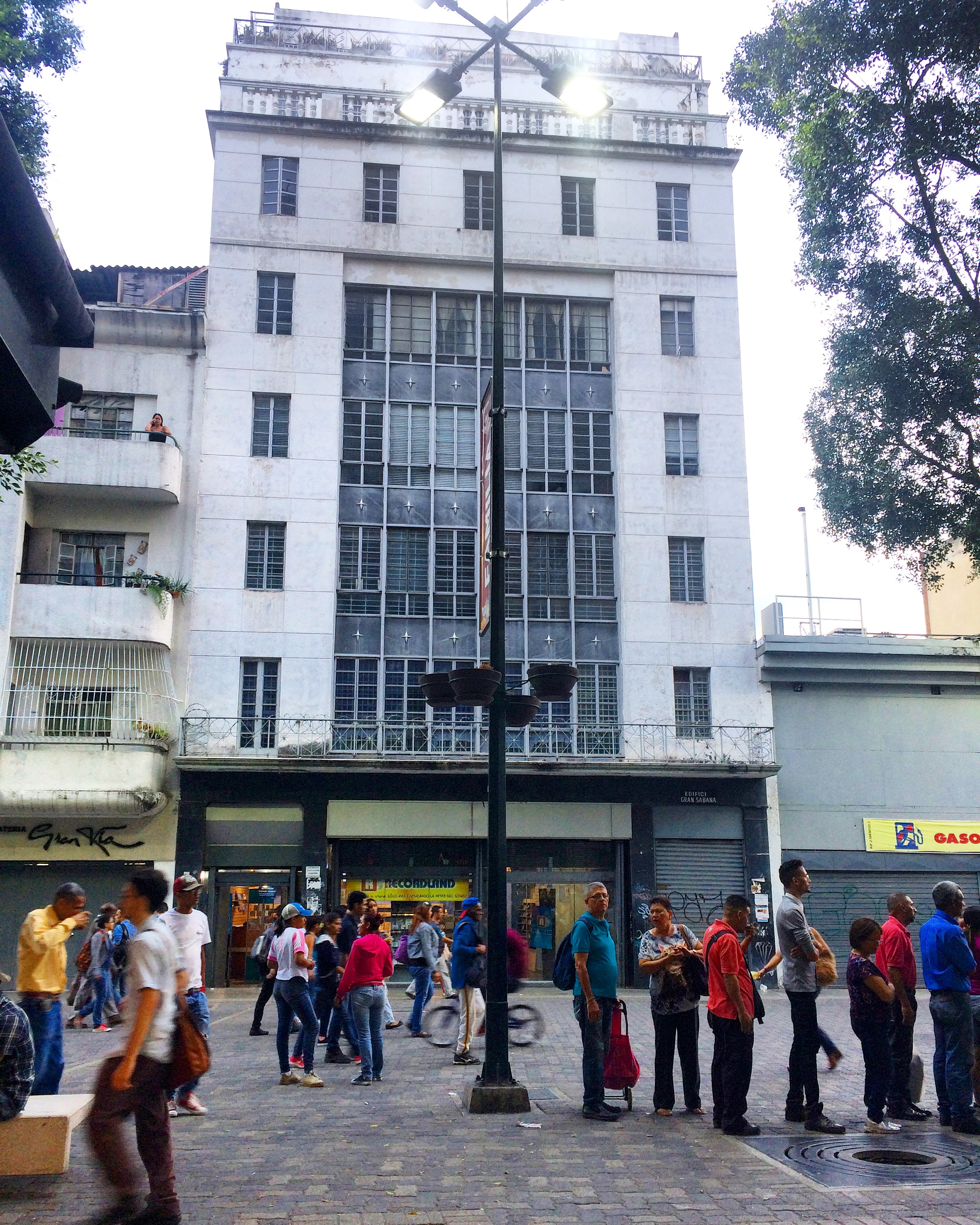
- Gran Sabana Building in Sabana Grande, home to the William Phelps Ornithological Collection
- Former name: William Phelps Museum, Museum of Ornithology William Phelps
- Established: 1949
- Location: Boulevard of Sabana Grande, Caracas, Venezuela
- Coordinates: 10.4912284°N 66.8773373°W
- Type: Science museum
- Founder: William H. Phelps Jr.
- Director: John Phelps
- Curator: Margarita Martínez
- Owner: Fundación Phelps
- Public transit access: Sabana Grande, Plaza Venezuela and Chacaíto (Caracas Metro)
- Parking: El Recreo Shopping Mall
- Website: fundacionwhphelps.org/web/nosotros/

The William Phelps Ornithological Collection, also known as the Phelps Ornithological Museum, is a museum of natural sciences dedicated to the study, exhibition and preservation of the birds of Venezuela and the rest of Latin America. The collection is located east of Caracas and in the geographic center of Greater Caracas, in the heart of the Sabana Grande district. The William Phelps ornithological collection is the most important in Latin America and it is also the most important private collection in the world in its research area.

In this private museum one will find important Phelps family study books, as well as 8000 scientific volumes in the library, more than 83,000 anatomical specimens, more than 80,000 skins, etc. For the year 1990, it was said that the William Phelps Ornithological Collection contained more than 76,300 skins and a small number of anatomical specimens, in the Gran Sabana Building of Sabana Grande. The Phelps library in 1990 already had 6,000 books, 800 journals and 5,500 reprints, mostly from natural sciences.

== History ==
The ornithological collection was born in 1938, although it did not have its own headquarters on the Boulevard of Sabana Grande until 1949. At the beginning of 2018, it celebrated its 80th anniversary in Caracas, Venezuela. With the passing of time, the collection has been growing and still has great international scientific relevance. In 2005, an investigation was carried out on "plumage differences in four subspecies of golden warbler Basileuterus culicivorus in Venezuela".

=== Importance ===
The Phelps Foundation has been recognized worldwide for its scientific research. Since 1937, this foundation has dedicated to the study of the distribution of birds in Venezuela as well as to the dissemination of ornithology in Venezuela. Since 1949, it has expanded globally in its mission to discover, interpret and disseminate information about ornithology through a program of scientific research, education and dissemination in the natural sciences. The Foundation has had an important global trajectory for which it is recognized and is a regional compulsory study resource on tropical birds for experts who want to know more about this area. This museum has historically been connected to the American Museum of Natural History, thanks to the work of Billy Phelps. The ornithological collection has also been expanded thanks to the research carried out with Armando Dugand from Bogotá, Colombia. Most of the funds to carry out these investigations were collected by the Phelps Foundation.

=== Research ===
In March and April 1977, the Phelps Ornithological Collection, with the collaboration of the Venezuelan-Brazilian Border Commission, Demarcador de Limites, carried out a collection of birds at Cerro Urutaní (62 ° 05'W, 3 ° 40'N), which is a low altitude tepui on the Venezuelan-Brazilian border in the Sierra Pacaraima. A total of 511 specimens of birds were collected between 1150 and 1280 meters high s.n.m., representing 78 different species. Gilberto Pérez Chinchilla, Manuel Castro and Robert Dickerman prepared the copies of the collection. A full report on these birds was published in the international press and was published in the Bulletin of the American Museum of Natural History, New York. It was necessary to work in conjunction with the Boundary Directorate of Venezuela.

== See more ==
- Sabana Grande (Caracas)
- Boulevard of Sabana Grande
- William Phelps
- El Recreo Shopping Mall
