= Boulevard of Sabana Grande =

Shopping area in Caracas, Venezuela

- Sabana Grande
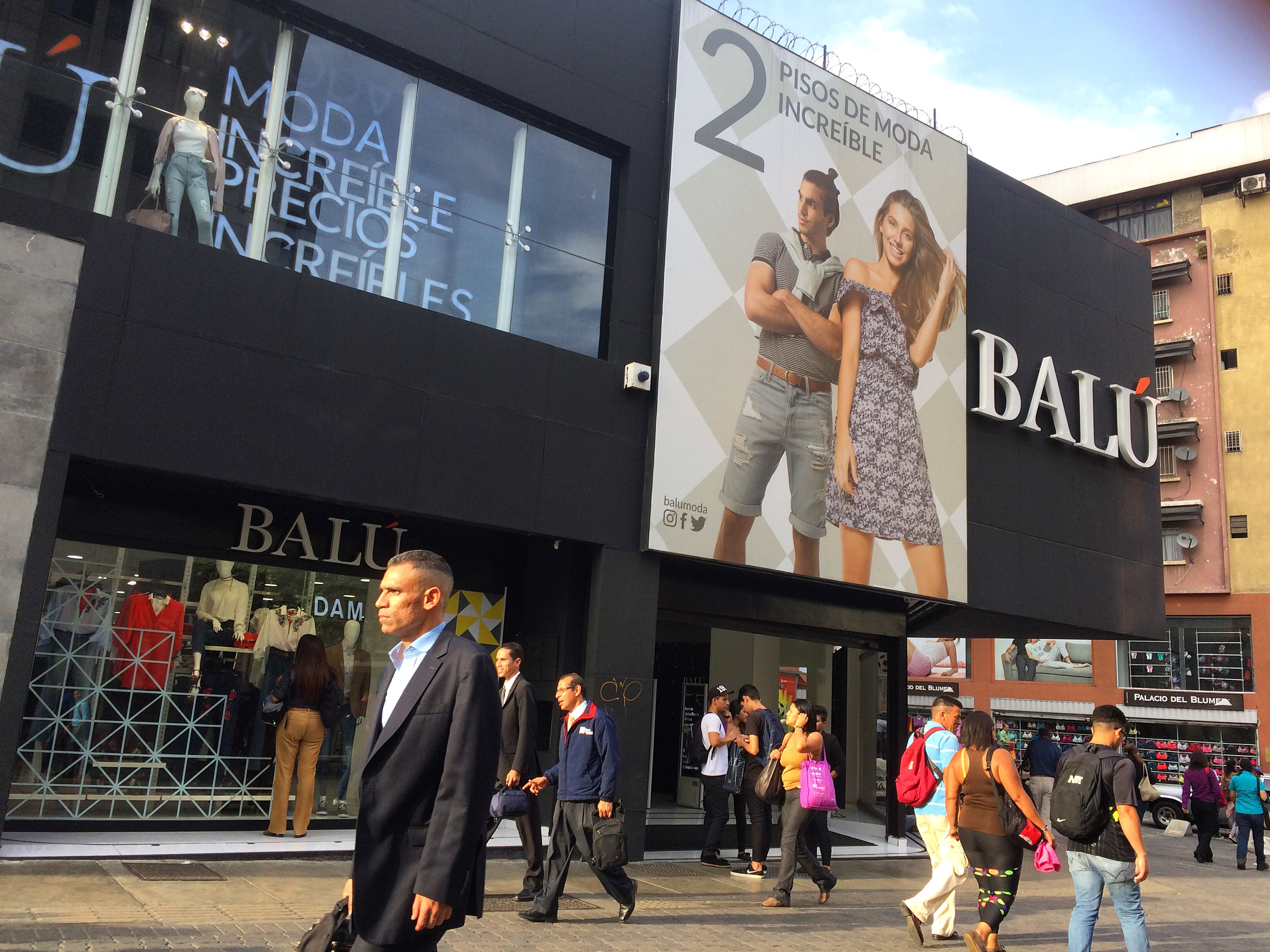
- Boulevard of Sabana Grande. Balú H&M shopping
- Interactive map of Boulevard of Sabana Grande
- Former names: Abraham Lincoln Avenue (50s-1983); Main Street of Sabana Grande (1700s-1950s)
- Type: public space, shopping thoroughfare
- Owner: PDVSA La Estancia, Caracas Metro, private entrepreneurs
- Length: 1,5 Km (1,8 Km Luis Brión Square added)
- Location: Parroquia El Recreo, Libertador Municipality and Chacao Municipality, Caracas
- Postal code: 1050
- Nearest metro station: Plaza Venezuela Metro Stop, Sabana Grande Metro Stop, Chacaíto Metro Stop
- Coordinates: 10.4892714°N 66.8737124°W
- San Antonio neighborhood end: Las Acacias Avenue
- Quebrada Chacaíto end: Plaza Luis Brión (Luis Brión Square)
- East: Luis Brión Square
- West: Plaza Venezuela (Venezuela Square)

Construction
- Commissioned: 70s
- Construction start: 70s
- Completion: 1983

Other
- Designer: PDVSA La Estancia
- Known for: shopping, tourism, business, financial district
- Status: completed, active

The Boulevard of Sabana Grande is an important leisure and shopping area located in eastern Caracas in the geographic center of the Metropolitan District of Caracas. It is a pedestrian-only, tree-shaded public space. In 2011, the boulevard of Sabana Grande went through a rehabilitation process founded by PDVSA La Estancia. A commercial and financial district, Sabana Grande is the commercial corridor, and a tourist district of Caracas. The boulevard of Sabana Grande is home to the most important ornithological collection in Latin America, the William Phelps Ornithological Collection. Until the beginning of the 20th century, it was called Calle Real (Royal Street) because it was the town's main road.

== History ==
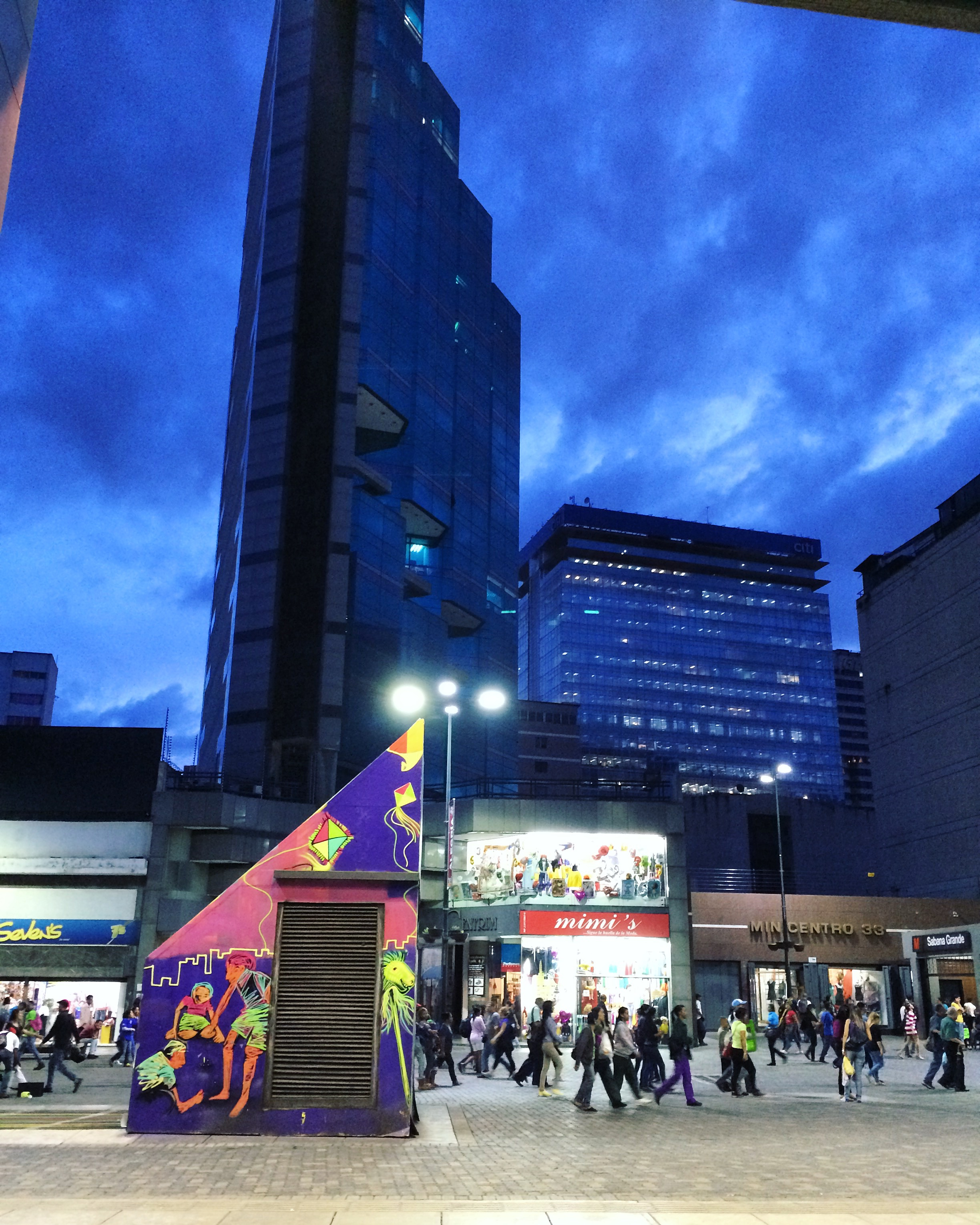
Sabana Grande at night (2017)

The boulevard of Sabana Grande was built on what was previously known as Abraham Lincoln Avenue. The land was ideal for the construction of the Caracas Metro. As early as 1968, El Nacional suggested that the fate of Abraham Lincoln Avenue was to remove cars from the street and turn it over to pedestrians.

Sabana Grande is the location of the main connections of the Caracas Metro system and has three stations: Plaza Venezuela, Sabana Grande and Chacaíto. The Boulevard of Sabana Grande extends from the Los Andes Building to Quebrada Chacaíto, where Chacao municipality begins. Following the subway project in Caracas, whose construction began in 1975, more Caraqueños began to arrive at Sabana Grande.

Following the problems between Caracas Metro and Libertador municipality of Caracas over who had responsibility for it, the boulevard of Sabana Grande was not maintained in the 1990s, but then re-emerged through a series of changes that were applied. In 1994, the Caracas Metro finally granted the administration of the boulevard to the Libertador municipality. In 2007, based on its historical value, the Venezuelan government commissioned its recovery to PDVSA and the Libertador municipality.

== Culture ==
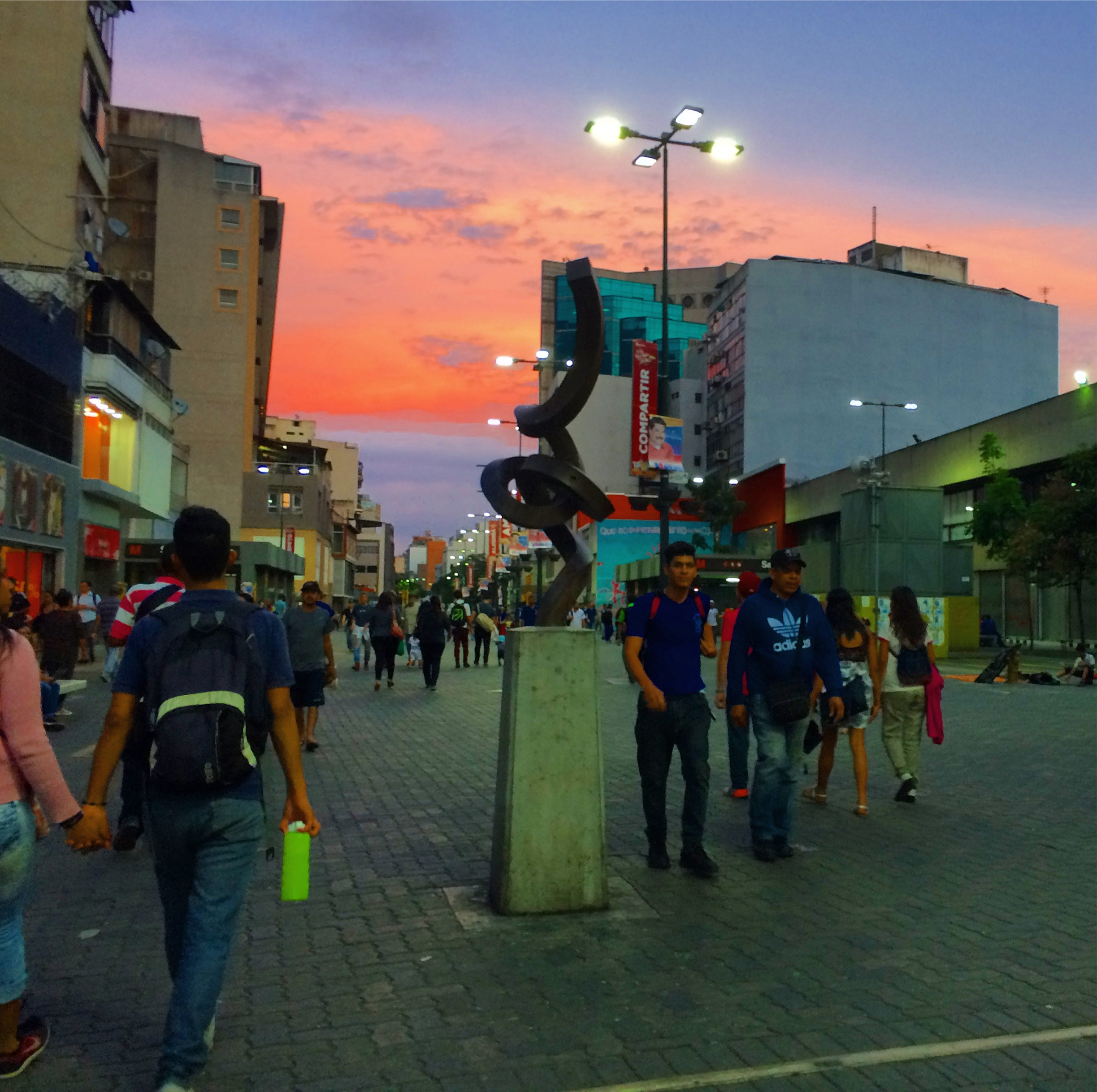
Artwork Anemoi, located in the heart of the boulevard of Sabana Grandein Caracas

The boulevard of Sabana Grande was recently restructured. This commercial corridor has places and buildings of high historical, cultural and patrimonial value, icons of the modern architecture of twentieth century Venezuelan. PDVSA Centro de Arte La Estancia, in the process of renovating the boulevard in 2011, identified a total of nine heritage properties in the second section of the pedestrian promenade.

The boulevard of Sabana Grande houses a number of important artworks. PDVSA La Estancia tried in Sabana Grande to connect art with the public spaces of Caracas. In Sabana Grande some sculptures have been removed and new ones have been added in recent years. The artwork Volumen by Francisco Narváez was not located in Sabana Grande at the time of its rehabilitation but was later included in the urban and artistic furniture of the place.

The registration of all the properties has not been carried out and it is necessary to perform an exhaustive investigation to determine who the architects were of all the important buildings on Sabana Grande. As of 2019, the designer of the who Araure Building located on the boulevard was unknown, even though it was declared part of the Architectural Heritage of Caracas. Most of the architectural heritage of Sabana Grande dates back to the twentieth century, although some buildings from the nineteenth century stand out, such as the Immaculate Conception Church of the Recreo.

== See also ==
- Altamira (Caracas)
- El Rosal (Caracas)
- La Castellana (Caracas)
