= Caño Amarillo station =

Caracas Metro station in Venezuela

Caño Amarillo
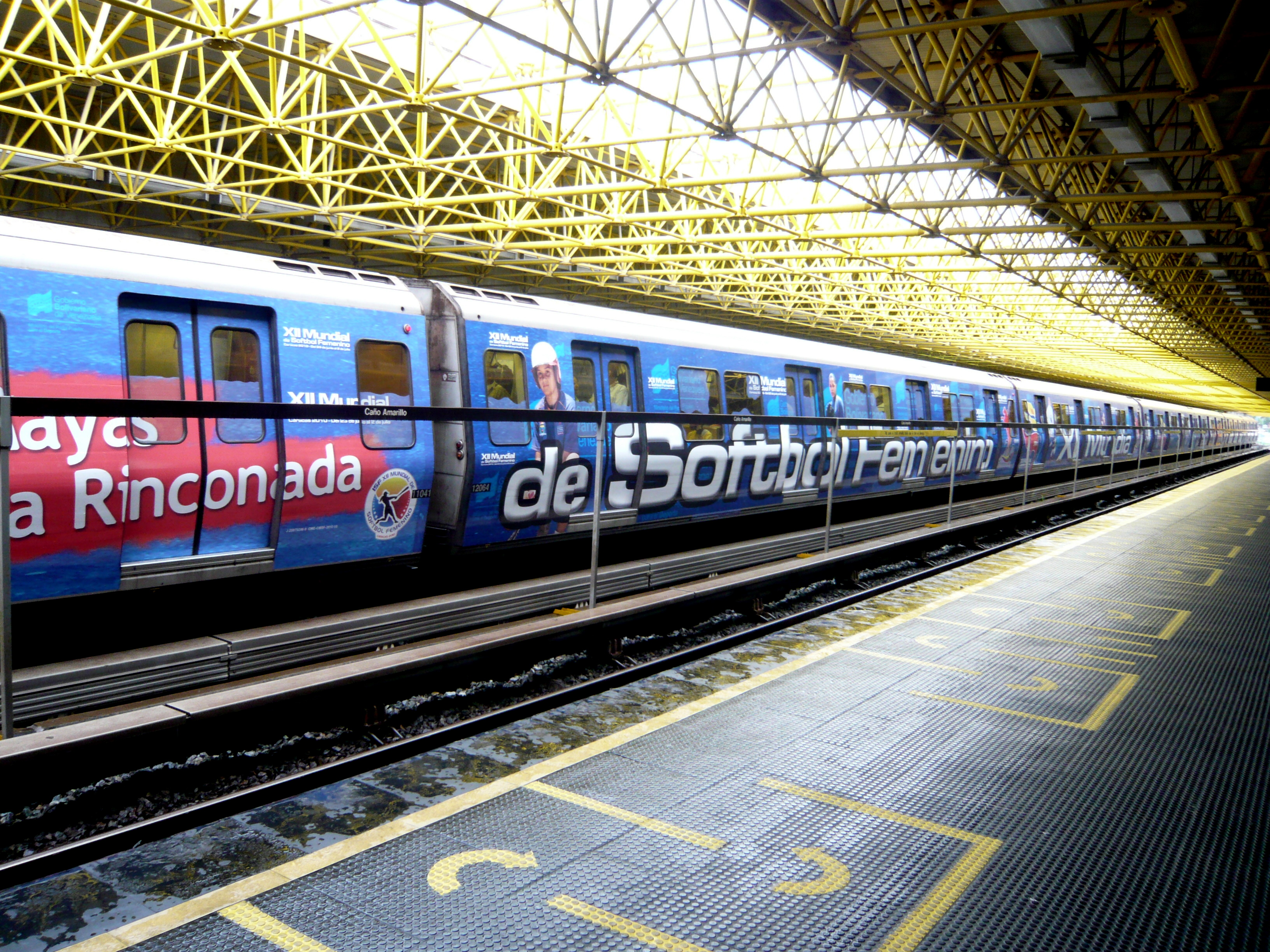
- A westbound train in the station

General information
- Location: 23 de Enero parish, Municipio; Libertador, Capital District; Venezuela
- Coordinates: 10°30′31.4″N 66°55′23.8″W
- System: Caracas Metro rapid transit station
- Operator: C.A. Metro de Caracas
- Line: Line 1
- Platforms: 2 side platforms
- Tracks: 2

Construction
- Structure type: elevated

History
- Opened: 2 January 1983

Services
| Preceding station | Caracas Metro | Following station |
|---|---|---|
| Agua Salud toward Propatria | Line 1 | Capitolio toward Palo Verde |
Location

Caño Amarillo is a Caracas Metro station on Line 1. It was opened on 2 January 1983 as part of the inaugural section of Line 1 between Propatria and La Hoyada. The station is between Agua Salud and Capitolio.

Caño Amarillo is one of the only two above ground stations of Line 1.
