= City Market Shopping Mall =

Shopping mall in Caracas, Venezuela

Coordinates: 10.49411°N 66.87808°W

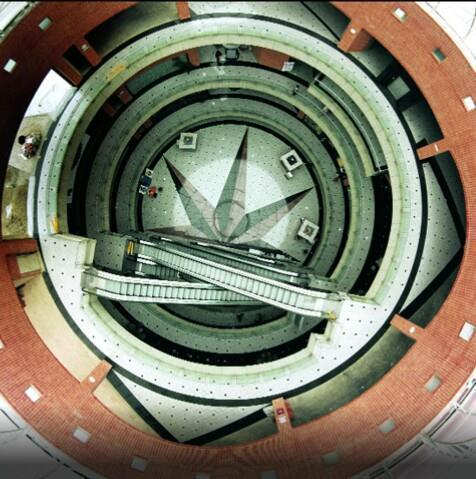
City Market Shopping Mall in the Sabana Grande district of Caracas

City Market Shopping Mall is an important shopping center located east of Caracas and in the geographical center of the Gran Caracas. It is part of the district of Sabana Grande designed by architect Enrique Feldman., Overall, he City Market Mall has a structure of 20 thousand square meters, five floors and 222 premises. Feldman took advantage of the strategic location of the project to integrate the mall with the Boulevard of Sabana Grande.

The framework of the structure was conceived as the integration of the shopping center with the main shopping corridor of Caracas, the Boulevard of Sabana Grande. Given its success, the staff of the City Market Shopping Mall is considering a possible expansion of the mall in the coming years.

== History ==
The City Market Shopping Mall is a mixed-use commercial center, with office towers and commercial spaces. It is divided into two malls: City Market Shopping Mall and City Market Bazaar. A good part of its merchants grew with the mall, since they were small entrepreneurs who did not have the option of investing in larger shopping centers.manager Grupo bazan and antonio cohen /> Despite their limited space, it nowadays receives 40,000 visits per day in the low season. In high seasons, the mall may receive 120 thousands visits per day.

Originally, the slogan of the City Market was: "The Center of Everyone", but it was later replaced by "The Technology Center of Caracas." The strength of City Market was its central location in Sabana Grande district, very close to the Caracas Metro and with several avenues in its surroundings. While in 2007-2008 it only had 11 stores open, in 2013-2014 it already had more than 160 stores open. Since 2009, the shopping mall has set its target: the technology and now has the presence of Samsung and authorized agents of Apple.

== See also ==
- El Recreo Shopping Mall
- Sabana Grande (Caracas)
- Boulevard of Sabana Grande
- Plaza Venezuela
- East Caracas
