= Mining in Venezuela =

Venezuela is a major producer and exporter of minerals, notably bauxite, coal, gold, iron ore, and oil, and the state controls most of the country's vast mineral reserves. In 2003 estimated reserves of bauxite totaled 5.2 million tons.

The third largest producer of coal in Latin America, after Colombia and Brazil, Venezuela produced 5.8 million short tons (1 short ton=2,000 pounds) in 2002, as compared with 9.3 million short tons in 2000, and exported most of it to other countries in the region, the eastern United States, and Europe. Known reserves for coal total 10.2 billion tons, of which approximately 528 million short tons are recoverable bituminous coal.

The main coalfields are located in the western Zulia State, on the border with Colombia. Other known reserves include natural bitumen (42 billion tons). Exploitable gold reserves, located mostly in the southeast, total an estimated 10,000 tons. In 2003 production totaled 20 million grams (or 20 tons), including 6 million grams attributed to unofficial mining activities, marking a sharp increase from 1999, when only 5.9 million grams were produced. In 2003 Venezuela's estimated reserves of iron ore totaled 14.6 million tons. Proven reserves total 4.1 billion tons, of which 1.7 billion tons are high-grade. Production has been increasing and totaled a record 19.2 million tons in 2003, two-thirds of which were exported. Iron-ore reserves are concentrated in the southeast.

== Oil ==
With 77,800,000,000 barrels (1.237×10^{10} m^{3}) of proven oil reserves in 2004, Venezuela has the largest proven oil reserves in South America and the sixth largest in the world—more than Canada, Mexico, and the United States combined. Venezuela's 2002 production of 2,800,000 barrels per day (450,000 m^{3}/d) (bbl/d) of crude was a drop of 8.3 percent over 2001 and the country's lowest production figure since 1994. In 2003, a year in which production was halted for a couple of months by a general strike and further disrupted by the firing of nearly half of the state oil company's work force, Venezuela's total oil production was an estimated 2,600,000 bbl/d (410,000 m^{3}/d). In 2004 oil production totaled about 3,000,000 bbl/d (480,000 m^{3}/d), according to the government's estimate. Prior to President Chávez's December 1998 election, Venezuela regularly exceeded its Organization of the Petroleum Exporting Countries (OPEC)-agreed oil production targets. Hugo Chávez maintained a policy of strict adherence to OPEC quotas and played a leading role in shifting OPEC from a volume-oriented strategy to one of controlling prices.

== Gold ==
Venezuela has experienced an oil dependency for an extended part of their history, but in the recent years, their focus has shifted over to gold. As a part of the 2016 settlement of a dispute over withdrawal of a gold concession to Gold Reserve, a Canadian mining company, the government entered into a joint venture to exploit the Brisas mine and Las Cristinas goldmines.

== See also ==
- Guaire miners
- Orinoco Mining Arc
- Gold holdings
