= Carlos Ocariz =

Venezuelan politician and engineer

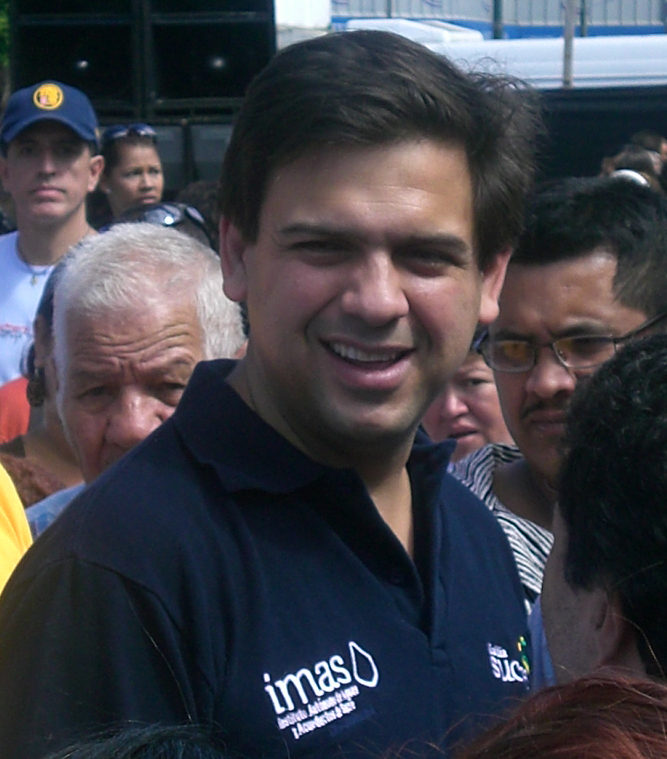
- Ocariz in 2010

Mayor of Sucre
- In office 10 December 2008 – 22 September 2017
- Preceded by: José Vicente Rangel Ávalos
- Succeeded by: José Vicente Rangel Ávalos

Deputy of the National Assembly for Miranda State
- In office 14 August 2000 – 5 January 2006

Personal details
- Born: 1 May 1971 (age 55) Caracas, Venezuela
- Party: Justice First
- Spouse: Mariángel Ruiz (m. 2015; div. 2021)
- Children: 2
- Education: Universidad Metropolitana
- Profession: Politician, Engineer

Carlos Eduardo Ocariz Guerra (born 1 May 1971, Caracas) is a Venezuelan politician and engineer. He was the mayor and former deputy of Sucre Municipality in east Caracas. Ocariz is a member of Justice First. On 22 February 2012, he announced he planned to run for the office of Governor of the state of Miranda after then Governor Henrique Capriles Radonski was announced as the opposition candidate against President Hugo Chávez in the 2012 presidential elections.
