= Capitolio =

Capitolio (the Spanish for capitol) can refer to:

- Colombia: Capitolio Nacional in Bogotá
- Cuba: El Capitolio in Havana
- Puerto Rico: Capitolio de Puerto Rico in San Juan
- Venezuela: Capitolio Federal in Caracas
  Capitolio, a metro station in Cararcas.

In Portuguese:

- Capitólio, a municipality in the Brazilian state of Minas Gerais
