= Juan Antonio Pérez Bonalde =

Venezuelan translator and poet

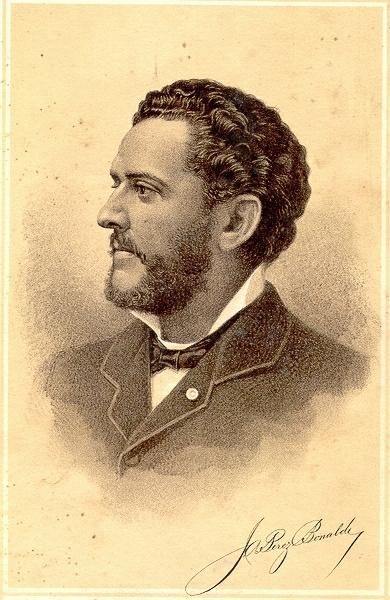
Perez Bonalde, Juan Antonio

Juan Antonio Pérez Bonalde (1846–1892) was a Venezuelan translator and poet. He is best known for his Hispanic romanticism style of work and was seen a precursor of Modernism. He is buried in the National Pantheon of Venezuela.

== Life ==
Juan Antonio Pérez Bonalde was born in Caracas, Venezuela, in 1846. His poem Vuelta a la Patria (Return to the Homeland) is about his return to Venezuela. He translated works of English, German, Italian, Danish, Chinese, Portuguese, and French writers into Spanish. The "Songbook" by Heine and the poem "The Raven" by Edgar Allan Poe are his most famous translations. After he lost a daughter, he wrote a poem Flor (Flower) in memory of her.

He lived many years in exile, due to political problems his family had with the government of that time. His family emigrated to Puerto Rico in 1861 fleeing from the Federal War. After the conclusion of the conflict he returned to Venezuela in 1864 but his stay was short lived when Antonio Guzmán Blanco came to power in 1870. He settled in New York, from where he traveled through the United States, Europe and South America but later returned to Venezuela in 1876 at the advent of a new president, Francisco Linares Alcántara. However, in just one year he returned to New York again, when Guzmán Blanco returned to power. Pérez Bonalde came back to his home country in 1889 at the request of President Raimundo Andueza Palacio but he could not assume his new post as diplomat due to health problems.

Pérez Bonalde died in La Guaira, Venezuela, in 1892. A metro station in Caracas is named after him.

== Works ==
- Estrofas (1877, English: Stanzas)
- Ritmos (1880, English: Rhythms)
- Poema del Niágara (1880, English: Niagara's Poem)
- Vuelta a la Patria (English: Return to the Homeland)
- Flor (English: Flower)
