= Capitolio station =

Caracas Metro station in Venezuela

Capitolio
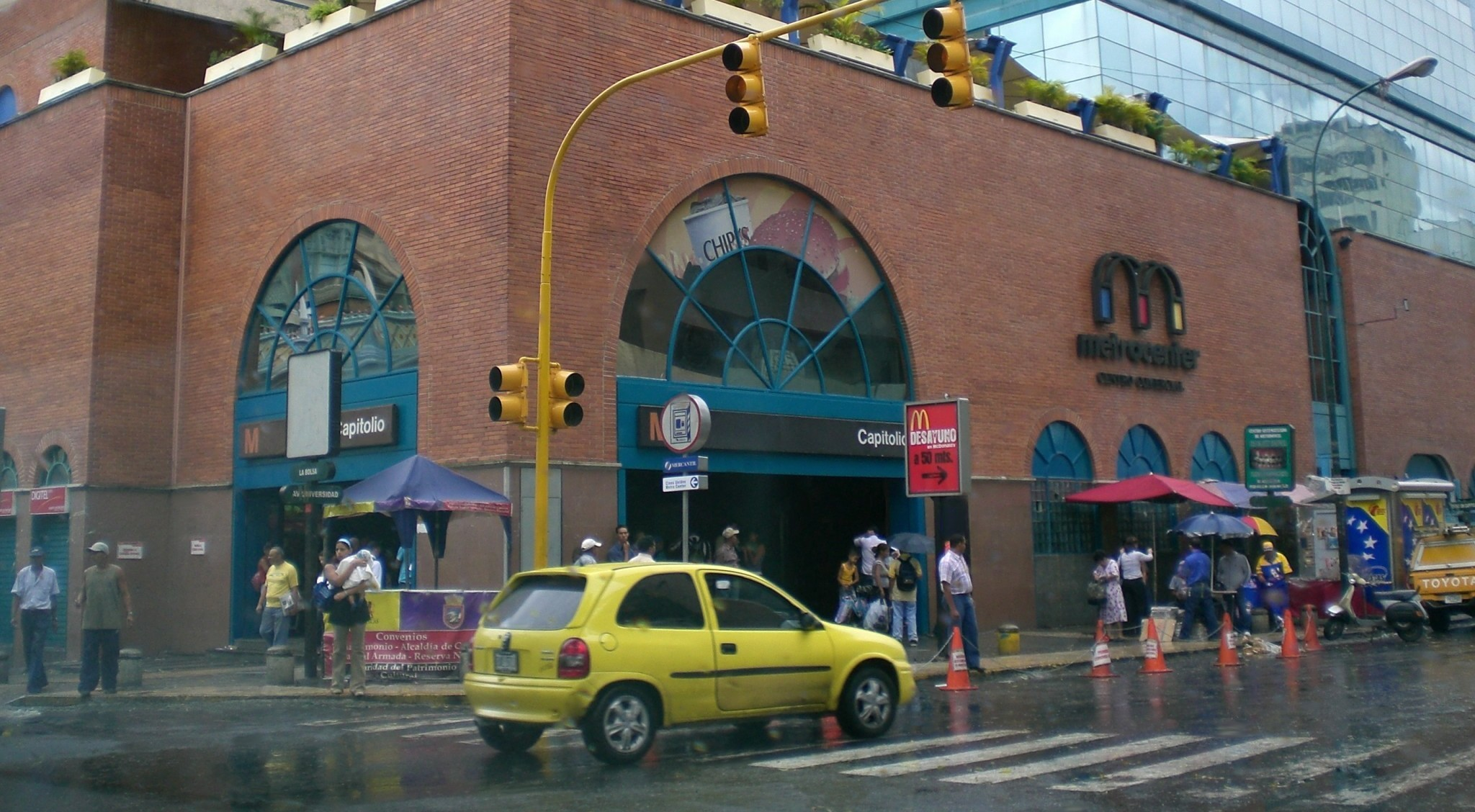
- The station in 2007

General information
- Location: Catedral parish, Municipio; Libertador, Capital District; Venezuela
- Coordinates: 10°30′17.4″N 66°55′05.1″W
- System: Caracas Metro rapid transit station
- Operator: C.A. Metro de Caracas
- Line: Line 1
- Platforms: 2 side platforms
- Tracks: 2
- Connections: Line 2

Construction
- Structure type: underground

History
- Opened: 2 January 1983

Services
Preceding station	Caracas Metro	Following station
Caño Amarillo toward Propatria	Line 1	La Hoyada toward Palo Verde
Location

Capitolio is a Caracas Metro station on Line 1. It was opened on 2 January 1983 as part of the inaugural section of Line 1 between Propatria and La Hoyada. The station is between Caño Amarillo and La Hoyada. It is a transfer station, connected with Line 2 via El Silencio. The station is located at the corner of Avenida Universidad and Avenida Baralt.

The name of the station originates from the Capitolio Federal which is located nearby.
