= Jimmy Alcock =

British-Venezuelan architect

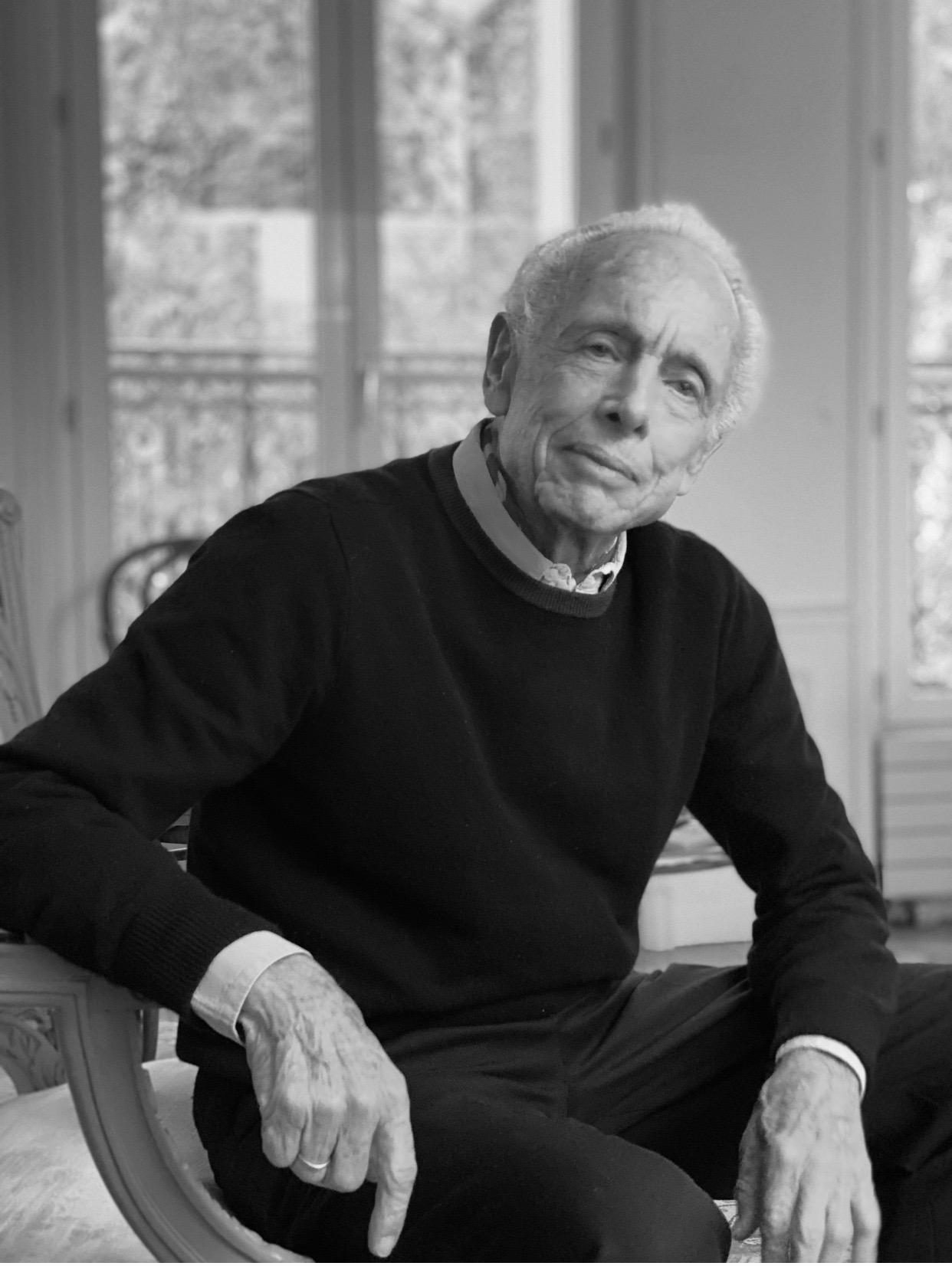
- Born: September 14, 1932 (age 93); Caracas, Venezuela
- Education: Universidad Central de Venezuela
- Occupation: Architect
- Notable work: Poliedro of Caracas; Edificio Parque de Cristal
- Awards: Order Francisco de Miranda in First Class, Republic of Venezuela (1994); HGM Award, Colegio de Arquitectos de Venezuela (2014); Medalla Paez de las Artes (2020)

Walter James Alcock Pérez, known as Jimmy Alcock (Caracas, September 14, 1932) is a British-Venezuelan architect who resides in Caracas. He won the National Architecture Prize of Venezuela in 1993 and is the XXXIV Member of the National Academy of Engineering and the Habitat of Venezuela.

== Biography ==
Born in Caracas, Venezuela in 1932 of a British father (Frank Alcock Lascelles) and a Venezuelan mother (Matilde Perez-Matos). He studied elementary school at Colegio La Salle of Caracas and later studied at Saint Edmunds College in Hertfordshire in England. He attended the School of Architecture and Urbanism of the Universidad Central de Venezuela, where he graduated as an architect in 1959. During that time he worked with the architect Alejandro Pietri in the Project of the Parque del Este, Caracas and in the Planning Project of the International Exhibition Fair of Caracas.

In 1958 he married Carolina Púnceles. In 1959 he associated with his teacher, the architect Jose Miguel Galia, with whom he worked until 1962, when he established his own architectural practice. He won several public and private architecture competitions, is a professor at the School of Architecture and Urbanism of the Central University and works on multiple and diverse projects of architecture, landscaping and important urban design, in Venezuela and abroad. In 1998 he associated with the architect Frank Alcock San Roman.

Jimmy Alcock's work has a volumetric clarity in search of an architectural composition closely linked to the landscape and the environment, to the vernacular, to functionality, but most importantly a strong concern for space and an emphasis on the tectonic and structural aspects of architecture. The integration of works of art as parts of architecture is significant and that is why he works with important artists such as Carlos Cruz-Díez, Magdalena Fernandez, Gego, Nedo Mion Ferrario, Jesus Soto, among many others.

In 1992, the exhibition Alcock Obras y Proyectos was held at the Galeria de Arte Nacional, Caracas, and participated with several projects in the exhibition Latin American in Construction: Architecture 1955–1980 at the Museum of Modern Art, New York in 2015.

== Awards and honors ==
- 1986 – National Single-Family Dwelling Award (Casa La Ribereña), Colegio de Arquitectos de Venezuela
- 1986 – Metropolitan Prize (Parque Cristal Building), Colegio de Arquitectos de Venezuela
- 1986 – Regional Award (Hotel Jirajara) together with Manuel Fuentes, Colegio de Arquitectos de Venezuela
- 1993 – National Architecture Award in Venezuela
- 1994 – Order Francisco de Miranda in First Class, Republic of Venezuela
- 2014 – HGM Award, Colegio de Arquitectos de Venezuela
- 2020 – Medalla Paez de las Artes, Venezuelan American Endowment for the Arts.

== Representative works ==
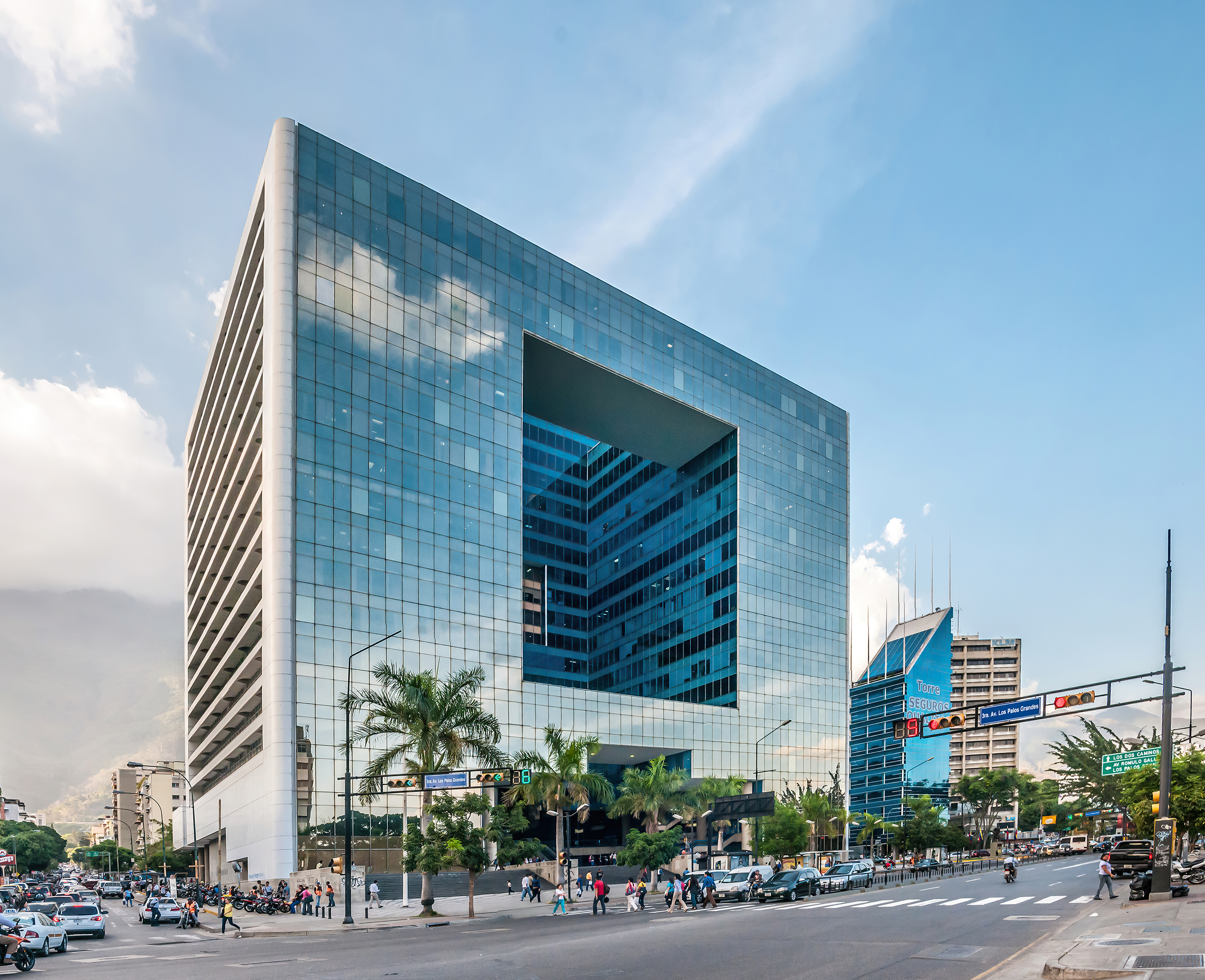
Main façade of Parque Cristal, located in the Chacao Municipality of Caracas.

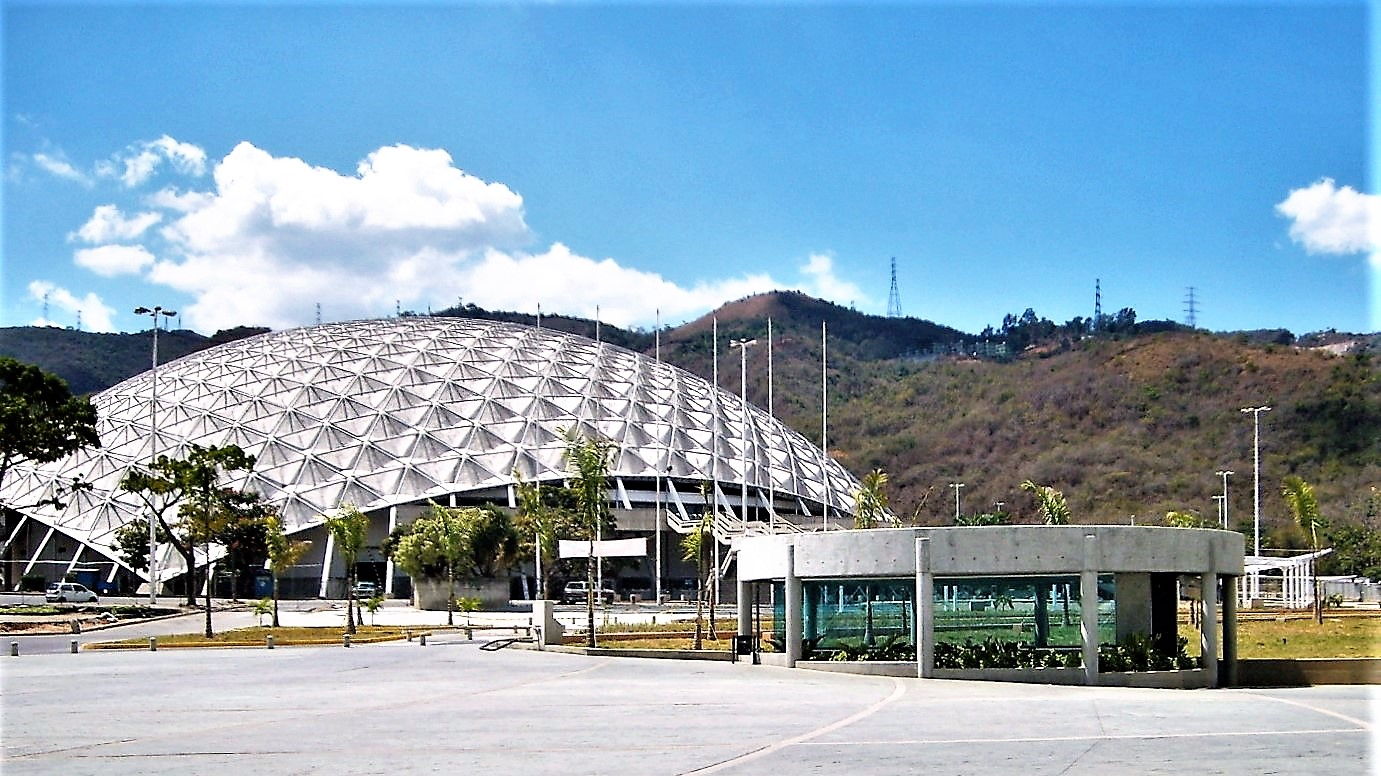
Poliedro of Caracas, located in the Libertador Bolivarian Municipality of Caracas

- Casa Alcock, Caracas Venezuela, (1962)
- Edificio Altolar, Caracas Venezuela, (1965)
- Paseo Las Mercedes Shopping Center, Caracas Venezuela, (1967)
- Poliedro of Caracas, Caracas Venezuela (1972)
- Hotel Jirajara, Barquisimeto Venezuela (1972)
- Casa Lopez, Caracas, Venezuela (1972)
- Torre Las Mercedes, Caracas Venezuela, (1975)
- Casa La Ribereña, Caracas Venezuela, (1976)
- Edificio Parque de Cristal, Caracas Venezuela, (1977)
- Casa Fischer II, Caracas, Venezuela, (1987)
- Casa Kavac, Caracas Venezuela, (1988)
- Casa San Judas, Caracas Venezuela, (1995)
