= Sambil Paraguaná =

- Location: Paraguaná, Venezuela
- Coordinates: 11°41′5″N 70°10′23.8″W
- Opened: 2009
- Manager: Sambil
- Owner: Sambil Malls
- Num. of anchor tenants: 4
- Floor area: 401,026 sq ft (37,256.5 m^{2})
- Floors: 1
- Website: tusambil.com/Mall/9/Sambil_Paraguana

Sambil Paraguaná Ciudad Turistica is a shopping mall and an urban development in Paraguaná. It contains a hotel, a movie theatre, and a supermarket. It is located at Falcón, Punto Fijo on Paraguaná Peninsula which is a duty-free zone,

== See also ==
- Centro Sambil
- List of shopping malls in Venezuela
- List of largest shopping malls as comparison.
