= Paseo Las Mercedes =

Shopping center in Caracas, Venezuela

Centro Comercial Paseo Las Mercedes
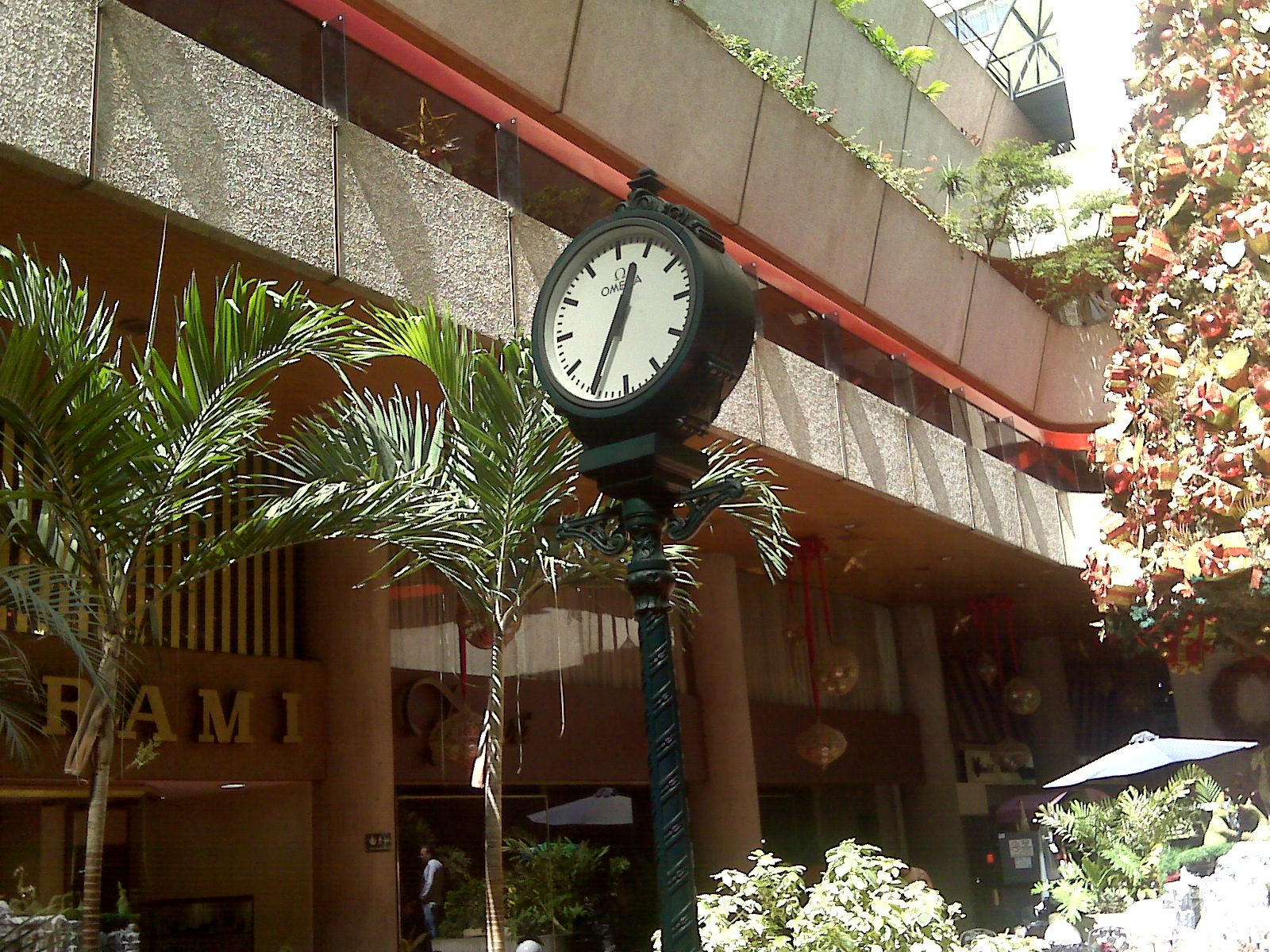
- Location: Paseo Enrique Eraso, Las Mercedes, Caracas, Venezuela

Centro Comercial Paseo Las Mercedes is a shopping mall located in Caracas, Venezuela. Its construction was completed in 1974, along with the Holiday Inn Hotel, designed by architect Jimmy Alcock between 1969 and 1971. The shopping center includes the Trasnocho Cultural, a cultural space inaugurated on 4 October 2001, which offers a wide variety of artistic and cultural activities. It has movie theaters that screen national and international films, as well as plays, art galleries, exhibitions, literary events, conferences, forums, and workshops. In addition, it has an agreement with the Baruta Municipality for municipal academic activities.

== See also ==
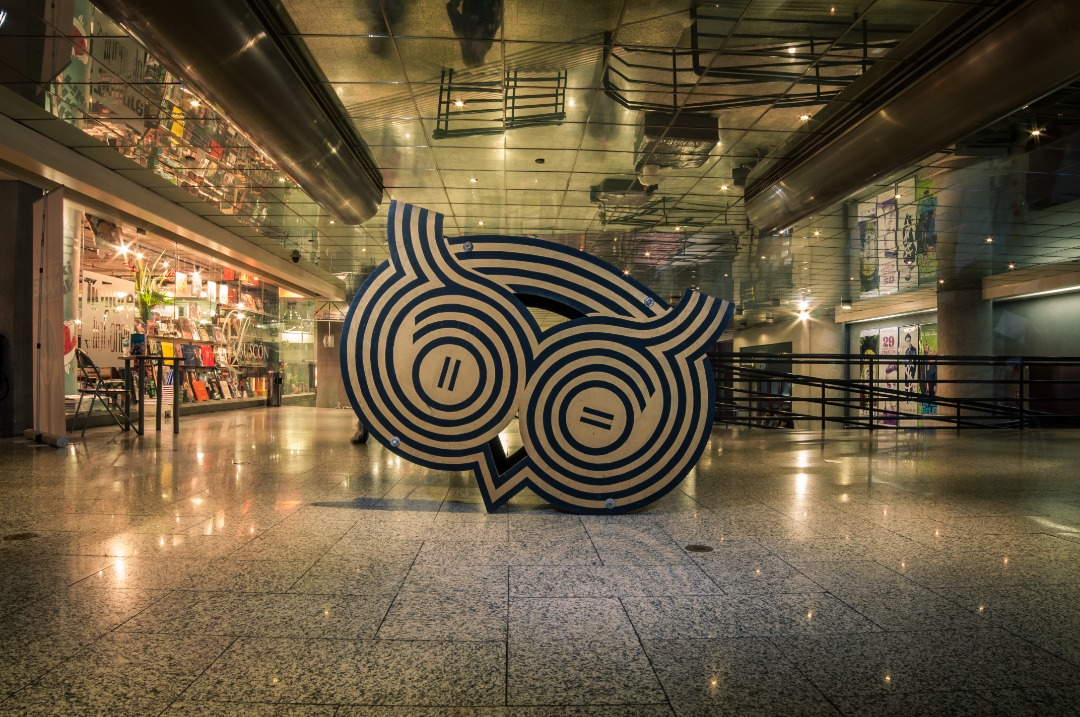
Trasnocho Cultural logo at the Paseo Las Mercedes.

- List of shopping malls in Venezuela
