= Parque Cristal =

National historical monument of Venezuela in Caracas

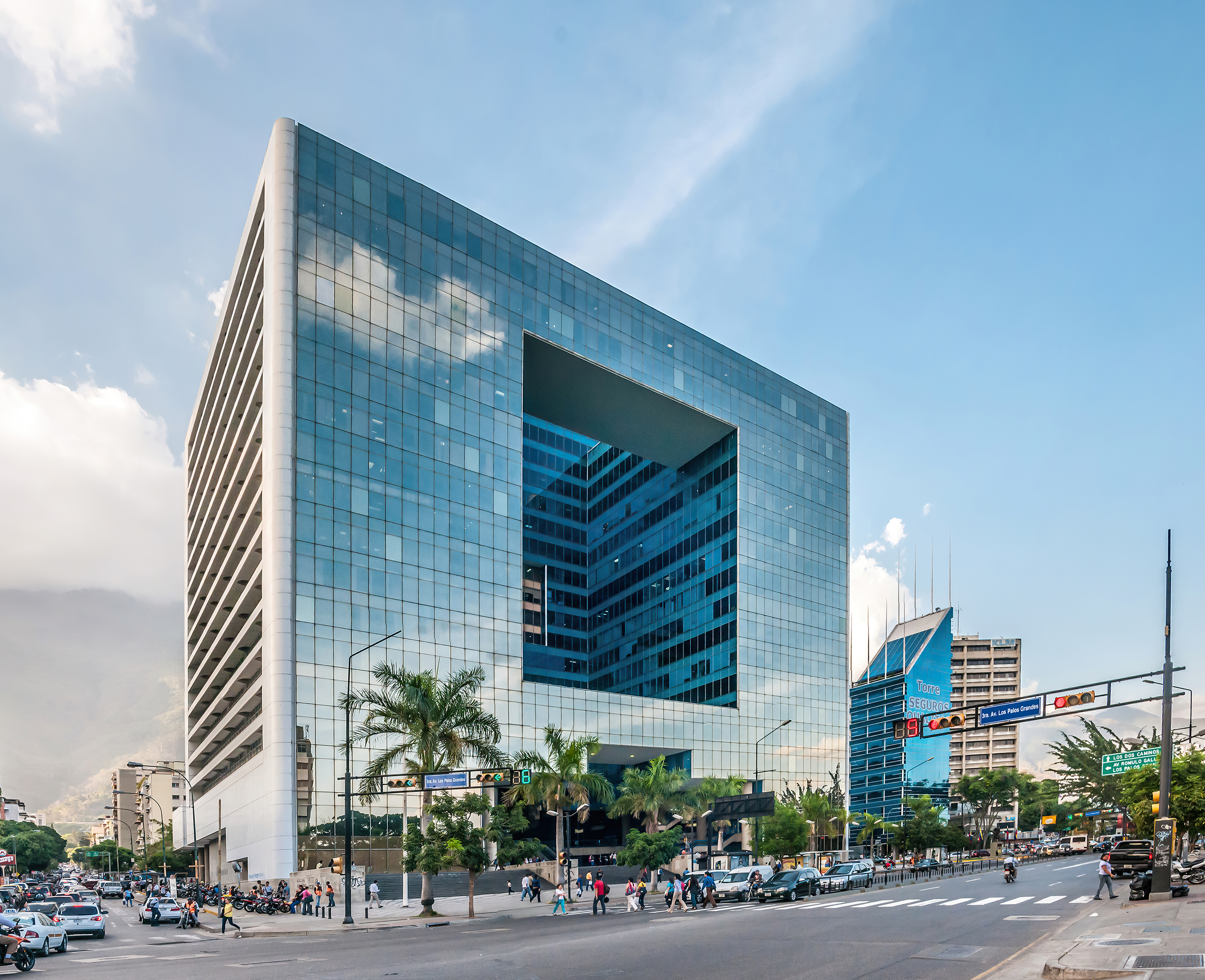
- Interactive map of the Parque Cristal area

General information
- Status: Completed
- Type: Office; Recreation
- Location: Caracas, Venezuela
- Coordinates: 10°29′52″N 66°50′35″W
- Completed: 1987

Design and construction
- Architect: Jimmy Alcock
- Structural engineer: Enrique Arnal

The Parque Cristal is an office and recreation building located on Avenida Francisco de Miranda in Caracas, Venezuela, which has become a famous landmark. It was seen as a symbol of development when it was constructed in 1977.

== Construction and design ==
The Parque Cristal was able to be constructed as a result of the Venezuelan oil boom. With its pair, the Cubo Negro, it is a "huge geometrical glass structure"; Mark Dinneen says they exemplify what was "perhaps the maximum expression of the wealth and technology of the period". The "white cube" design of the Parque Cristal is complemented by the Cubo Negro building, which is nearby and was completed around the same time. Roberto Segre describes the reflective glass design to allow "those who control" to see the activities of "all the controlled, but not vice versa".

The building is 103 meters (338 ft) high and has 18 floors for work and recreational space. It was designed by Jimmy Alcock, who won the Premio Metropolitano de Arquitectura (Metropolitan Architecture Prize) for his design. It has a cube-shaped structure formed by steel and concrete with glass facade. The building is located on a steep hill with poor ground conditions; this resulted in the unusual lower-floor designs as a structural solution, conceived of by engineer Enrique Arnal. The floors are mosaic and were designed by Nedo Mion Ferrario between 1980 and 1983.

The block is split into two sections: the tall office cube and a shorter urban building in a semicircle at the back. Similarly the main entrance to the building is an open urban space with passages to the surrounding streets and the connected metro station, rising to a shopping plaza via escalators. The south facade appears to have a 'window' looking towards Parque del Este.

Of its status, Roberto Segre writes:

The symbol of capital is no longer imposed by the monumentality of granite and marble columns [...], but by the impalpable image of the clean technological volume, a real object so close to fiction. Since it is, in so far as its existence does not correspond to the actual resources, the actual materials or the actual needs that exist in the underdeveloped country.

== Facilities ==
The complex contains a gas station; it has three pumps and was selling petrol at no more than six US cents per gallon in 2015.

Parque Cristal is considered an important part of Caracas' financial sector, and a marker for how the 'center' of the city has progressively moved further geographically east over time.

== In popular culture ==
The Parque Cristal is used as a location in Tom Clancy's Commander-in-Chief, where a covert meeting is held on the top floor after characters enter by "looking up to marvel at the remarkable architecture".
