= Salomón Cohen Levy =

- שלמה כהן לוי
- Born: 28 May 1927; Jerusalem, Mandatory Palestine
- Died: 24 June 2018 (aged 91); Caracas, Venezuela
- Education: Universidad Central de Venezuela
- Occupation: Founder of constructora sambil
- Website: Sambil website (in Spanish)

Salomón Cohen Levy (Hebrew: שלמה כהן לוי; 28 May 1927 – 24 June 2018) was a Moroccan Jewish-Venezuelan civil engineer and real estate businessman. He was the founder and owner of the construction company Sambil.

== Biography ==
Salomón Cohen was born in Jerusalem, then in the British Mandate of Palestine, into a Moroccan Jewish family which resided in the Spanish protectorate in Morocco. His family moved to Caracas, the capital of Venezuela, at the age of three, when his father Ezra Sión Cohen looking for a better future in the thriving Latin American country. He studied at the Liceo Andrés Bello.

In 1951, he obtained a degree in civil engineering at the Central University of Venezuela. He started his career as an engineer at the Ministry of Public Works and Housing during the mandate of President Marcos Pérez Jiménez in 1953. He left his post at the ministry and was appointed as manager at Banco Obrero. Cohen was a member of the Israelite Association of Venezuela.

== Business ventures and investments ==
In 1953 he founded Constructora Sambil, and became a real estate businessman. His first major project was the Lido shopping mall located in El Rosal, Caracas; with a mix of offices and hotel rooms, it gave birth to the Lidotel chain. In 1998 it expanded into a growing developing business, the building and administration of shopping malls, opening the Centro Sambil located in Chacao. Later on more Shopping malls openings followed in other cities in Venezuela, Curaçao and the Dominican Republic.

In 2012, his company purchased the Spanish shopping mall Avenida M-40, which closed in 2010 due to the 2008 financial crisis. Sambil was renovating it and planned to re-open it as an outlet center in the summer of 2015. It will be renamed Sambil Outlet Madrid.

After his death on June 24, 2018, all Sambil shopping malls in the country closed their doors for three days as a sign of mourning.

== See also ==
- Centro Sambil
