= Brisas mine =

Gold mine in Bolívar, Venezuela

Location
- Location: Bolívar, Venezuela

Production
- Products: Gold

Owner
- Company: Gold Fields

The Brisas mine is one of the largest gold mines in Venezuela and in the world. The mine is located in the Orinoco Arc in the center of the country in Bolívar. The mine has estimated reserves of 10.2 million oz of gold.
