= José Vicente Rangel Ávalos =

Venezuelan politician (born 1956)

José Vicente Rangel Ávalos (born 2 February 1956) is a Venezuelan politician and mayor of Sucre Municipality in Caracas. He is the son of Venezuelan former vice president José Vicente Rangel Vale and Chilean sculptor Ana Avalos.

In 2017, the Government of Canada sanctioned Rangel Avalos as being someone who participated in "significant acts of corruption or who have been involved in serious violations of human rights".
