= Sabana Grande, Caracas =

Place in Venezuela

Sabana Grande district
- neighborhood
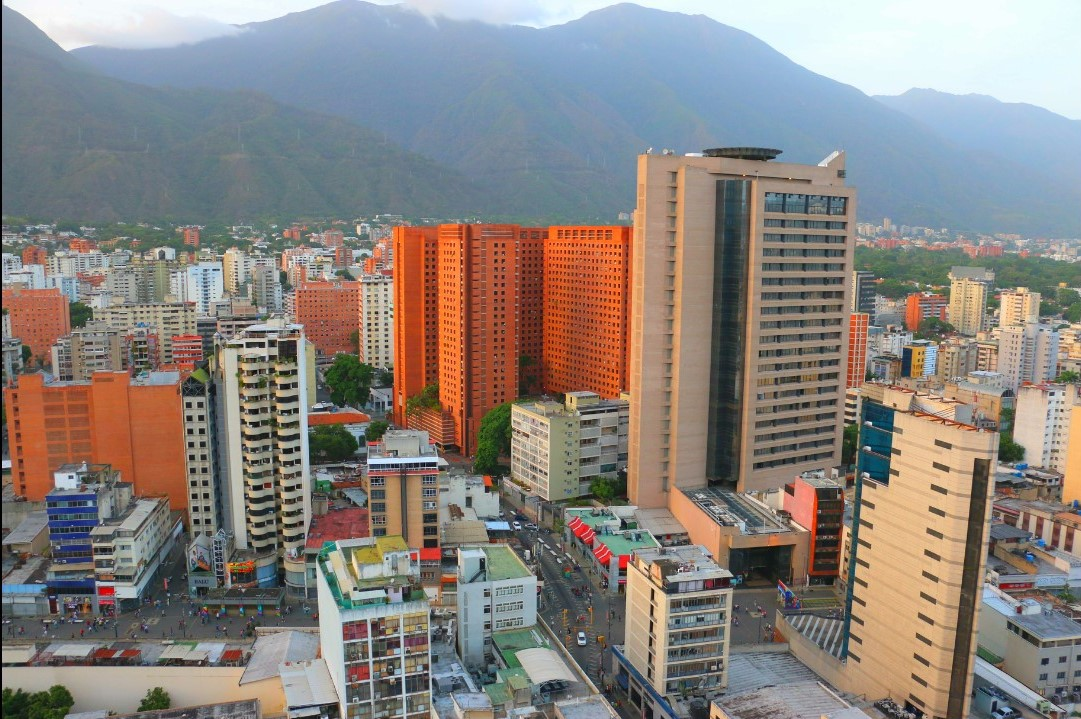
- Aerial view of the Sabana Grande Area, downtown district

- Location within Venezuela
- Coordinates: 10.4892714°N 66.8737124°W
- Country: Venezuela
- Federal district: Distrito Capital
- City: Caracas
- Municipality: Libertador
- Parish: El Recreo
- Time zone: UTC−4 (VET)

The Sabana Grande district is divided into several middle class neighborhoods located in the Parroquia El Recreo of the Libertador Municipality, in the geographical center of the Metropolitan District of Caracas. It owes its name to the old town of Sabana Grande.

== History of Sabana Grande ==
=== Foundation and early years ===
Originally, the area where today stands the commercial and financial sector Sabana Grande, was an agricultural town in which there were some coffee plantations, such as Hacienda Ibarra, which extended to the Central University of Venezuela and part of the neighborhoods Colinas de Bello Monte and Las Mercedes. At first, the town of Sabana Grande was connected to the agricultural community of Chacao. Hacienda Ibarra was expropriated during the government of Isaías Medina Angarita to modernize the city and part of the previous house is still conserved in the campus of the Central University of Venezuela. The main house of this hacienda was located in Bello Monte of the financial district Sabana Grande, and this house no longer exists. The town of Sabana Grande was the communication route between Caracas to the large plantations (haciendas) located on the outskirts of the city.

Although PDVSA La Estancia has done a research, they have no consensus on the date of foundation of Parroquia El Recreo. Some say that around 1852, the area was elevated to a foreign parish by the Caracas authorities, which served to overcome its status as a hamlet, given the significant number of inhabitants and buildings. Others say that, Parroquia El Recreo was created on November 22, 1864 and not in 1852. According to the historian Manuel Landaeta Rosales (1847-1920), El Recreo was founded on November 22, 1952 as a civil parish. Later, on February 22, 1964, it was founded as an ecclesiastical parish.

On November 4, 1870, the area was integrated into the city of Caracas by the Caracas authorities in the government of Antonio Guzmán Blanco and was named "The Immaculate Conception and San Jose del Recreo" by the presbyter Jose Botel Peraza. Over time, Sabana Grande became a popular summer destination for college students and that's why the area was known as "El Recreo". Sabana Grande was definitively separated from Chacao when it was annexed as the eastern parish of Caracas.

=== 19th century ===
Towards the end of the 19th century, the Hippodrome of Sabana Grande (Las Delicias area), run by the Jockey Club of Caracas, operated in the area, and its executives included the prominent artist Arturo Michelena. This hippodrome was the first in Caracas and worked in the area until 1906 when the racecourse was moved to El Paraíso neighborhood.

This important commercial district of Caracas also had the first two commercial centers of Caracas: The East Shopping Center (on Casanova Avenue) and The Gran Avenida, formerly known as Fifth Avenue Shopping Center. The first one is still open on "Avenida Casanova" and the second one was located at the exit of the Metro Plaza Venezuela, where the bus stop to San Antonio de Los Altos is located. The East Sabana Grande Shopping Center was built by the architect Diego Carbonell, with a ring of shops around a central parking lot separate from the street, which meant that some stores had double access.

=== Caracas Metro ===
In the eighties, the construction of Sabana Grande station of Caracas Metro brought more people to the financial district of Sabana Grande. Since then, Sabana Grande became a place of mass recreation. The financial district of Sabana Grande has three metro stations: Plaza Venezuela, Sabana Grande and Chacaíto. This district is the best covered by the Caracas Metro. The boulevard of Sabana Grande was built from the surroundings of "La Previsora Tower" to the Plaza Brión de Chacaíto. The Plaza Brión de Chacaíto was built according to the commercial and financial district of Sabana Grande, despite belonging to Chacao Municipality today. As a result of the problems of authority between the Caracas Metro and the Libertador Municipality, the Sabana Grande district lost maintenance and surveillance in the 1990s. In 1994, the Caracas Metro finally granted the administration of the Boulevard of Sabana Grande to the Libertador Municipality of Caracas.

== See also ==
- Boulevard of Sabana Grande
- Altamira (Caracas)
- City Market Shopping Mall
- El Rosal, Caracas
- Las Mercedes (district in Caracas)
- Libertador Municipality
