= Centro Sambil =

Venezuelan shopping mall

Coordinates: 10°14′20″N 68°00′01″W

Centro Sambil in Caracas

Centro Sambil Caracas, located in Caracas, Venezuela, is the sixth largest shopping mall in South America. It was completed in 1998 and has over 500 stores in approximately 3 million square-feet (250,000 square metres). The mall has five levels: Autopista, Libertador, Acuario, Feria, and Diversión. There are other Sambil malls located in Valencia, Margarita, Maracaibo, San Cristóbal, Barquisimeto, Paraguaná, Santo Domingo, Curaçao and Madrid.

The mall is owned by Constructora Sambil, run and owned by the Salomon Cohen Levy family. Alfredo Cohen is the director.

A second mall in Caracas is located in La Candelaria parish under the name "Centro Sambil La Candelaria". In December 2008, just months before the building was inaugurated, the Venezuelan government, under President Hugo Chávez, expropriated the building without compensation. After the government took over the building, the building remained unfinished, dismantled and unoccupied until 2011 when it was used as a homeless shelter and then, as a warehouse of the government. On March 18, 2022 the government of Venezuela returned the ownership of the building to the Salomon Cohen family, which soft opened by November 30, 2022 and to grand open by May 28, 2023.

== See also ==
- Sambil Paraguaná
