= El Recreo Shopping Mall =

Shopping mall in Caracas, Venezuela

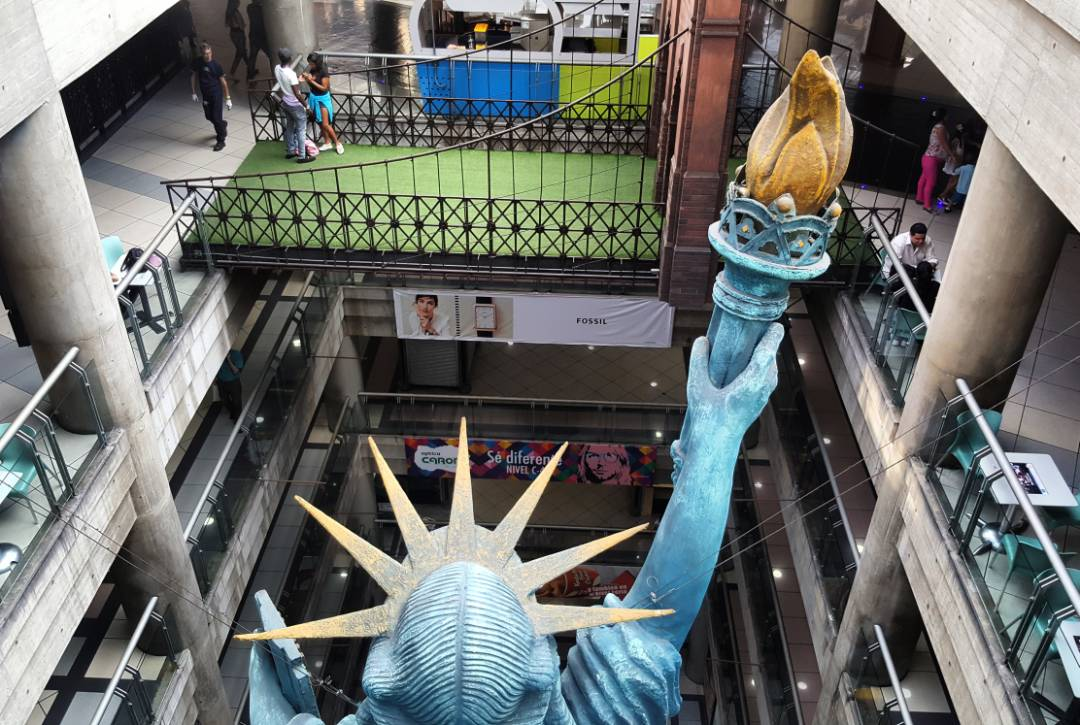
- The mall in 2018
- Location: Sabana Grande, Caracas, Venezuela
- Coordinates: 10.4916546°N 66.8798977°W

El Recreo Shopping Mall is a large shopping mall in the commercial, financial, tourist and cultural district of Sabana Grande, Caracas, Venezuela. According to Top Shopping Centers magazine, the mall averaged three million visitors per month in 2013-2014. At 28 metres (92 ft) and seven floors below grade, it is Latin America's deepest construction and part of the late-1990s real-estate boom in Sabana Grande. El Recreo Shopping Mall was designed by Venezuelan architects Carlos Gómez de Llarena and Moisés Benacerraf. The shopping center's twin towers—the 125-metre (410 ft) Citibank and Movilnet Towers—are the tallest skyscrapers in the Venezuelan capital. The mall is connected to the Gran Meliá Caracas Hotel.

== Overview ==
The mixed-use commercial center, with office towers and commercial space, has investors from North America and Venezuela. The commercial area, about 30,000 square metres (320,000 sq ft), has a variety of shops. Its fitness center, Gold's Gym El Recreo, was ranked as the company's best international gym during its annual convention in 2011. The mall, also used for noncommercial purposes, has lent its facilities to Espacio Anna Frank of the Venezuelan Jewish community.

The food court, a dedicated 2,263-square-metre (24,360 sq ft) floor with seating for over 1000 people, is Venezuela's largest. It serves dishes from a variety of cuisines, including Italian, Spanish, Japanese, Mexican and American.
