= Los Dos Caminos station =

Caracas metro station

Los Dos Caminos
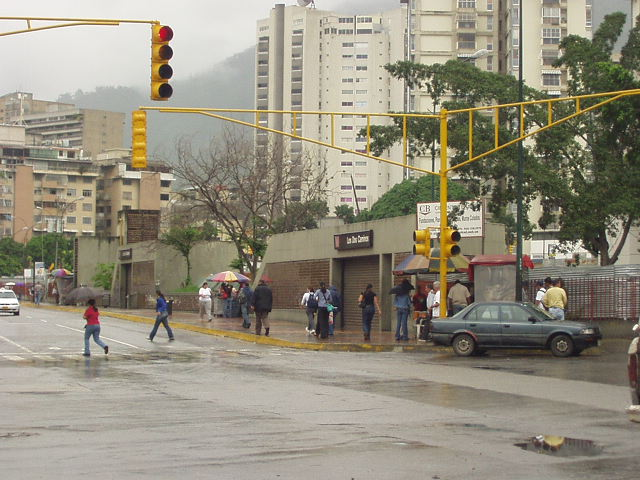
- Station in 2004

General information
- Location: Sucre, Miranda; Venezuela
- Coordinates: 10°29′42.6″N 66°50′02.6″W
- System: Caracas Metro rapid transit station
- Operator: C.A. Metro de Caracas
- Line: Line 1
- Platforms: 1 island platform
- Tracks: 2

Construction
- Structure type: underground

History
- Opened: 23 April 1988

Services
Preceding station	Caracas Metro	Following station
Miranda toward Propatria	Line 1	Los Cortijos toward Palo Verde
Location

Los Dos Caminos is a Caracas Metro station on Line 1. It was opened on 23 April 1988 as the eastern terminus of the extension of Line 1 from Chacaíto. On 10 November 1989, the line was extended further to Palo Verde. The station is between Miranda and Los Cortijos.
