= El Recreo Parish =

El Recreo
- Parish
- Country: Venezuela
- Federal district: Distrito Capital
- Municipality: Libertador

Area
  - Total: 18.1 km^{2} (7.0 sq mi)

Population (2011)
  - Total: 144,480
  - Density: 7,980/km^{2} (20,700/sq mi)

El Recreo is one of the 22 parishes located in the Libertador Bolivarian Municipality and one of 32 of Caracas, Venezuela.
