= Chacaíto station =

Caracas metro station

Chacaíto
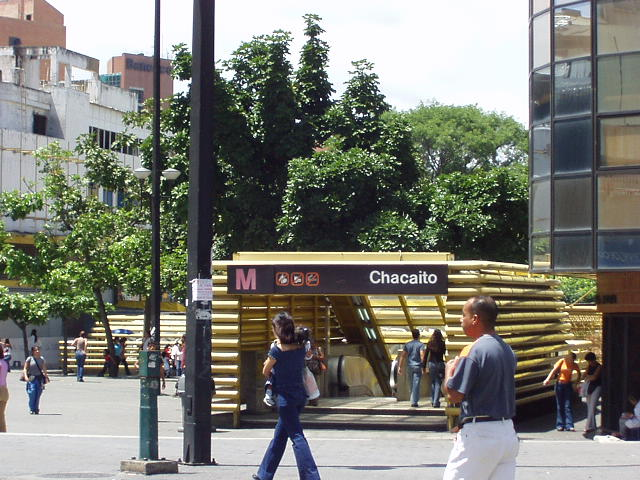
- Station in 2004

General information
- Location: Chacao, Miranda; Venezuela
- Coordinates: 10°29′29.5″N 66°52′02.7″W
- System: Caracas Metro rapid transit station
- Operator: C.A. Metro de Caracas
- Line: Line 1
- Platforms: 2 side platforms
- Tracks: 2

Construction
- Structure type: underground

History
- Opened: 27 March 1983

Services
Preceding station	Caracas Metro	Following station
Sabana Grande toward Propatria	Line 1	Chacao toward Palo Verde
Location

Chacaíto is a Caracas Metro station on Line 1. It was opened on 27 March 1983 as the eastern terminus of the extension of Line 1 from La Hoyada. On 23 April 1988 the line was extended to Los Dos Caminos. The station is between Sabana Grande and Chacao.
