= Sucre Municipality, Miranda =

Sucre Municipality Municipio Sucre
- Municipality
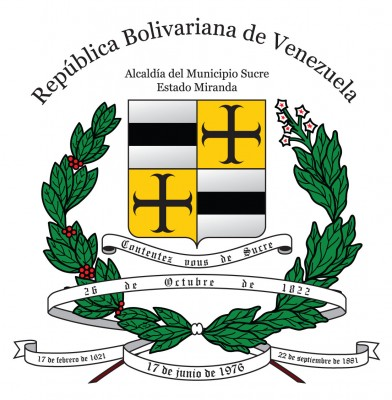
- Flag Coat of arms

- Location in Miranda

- Location in Venezuela
- Coordinates: 10°28′19″N 66°45′39″W
- Country: Venezuela
- State: Miranda
- City: Caracas
- Founded: February 17, 1621
- Incorporated: 1989
- Municipal seat: Petare

Government
  - Mayor: José Vicente Rangel Ávalos (PSUV)

Area
  - Total: 199.0 km^{2} (76.8 sq mi)

Population (2016)
  - Total: 691,317
  - Density: 3,474/km^{2} (8,998/sq mi)
- Time zone: UTC−4 (VET)
- Area code(s): 0212
- Website: Official website

Sucre Municipality is one of the 21 municipalities (municipios) that makes up the Venezuelan state of Miranda and one of five the municipalities that make up the Metropolitan District of Caracas. According to a 2016 population estimate by the National Institute of Statistics of Venezuela, the municipality has a population of 691,317. The parish of Petare is the municipal seat of the Sucre Municipality.

It includes the neighborhood of La Carlota, Miranda near the Generalissimo Francisco de Miranda Air Base and the former presidential residence La Casona.

== Name ==
The municipality is one of several in Venezuela named "Sucre Municipality" in honour of Venezuelan independence hero Antonio José de Sucre.

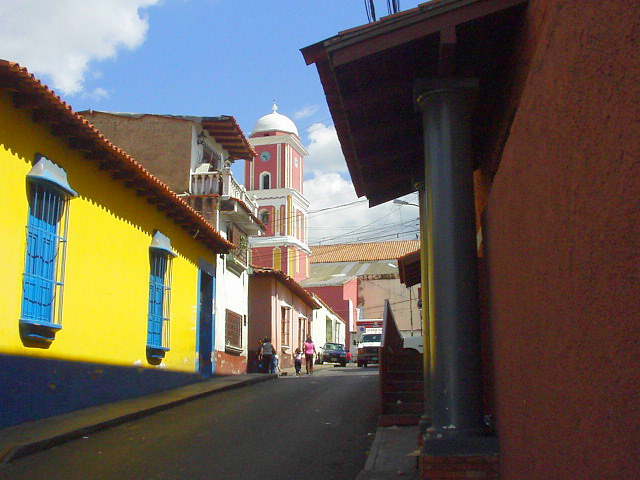
Petare´s historic center

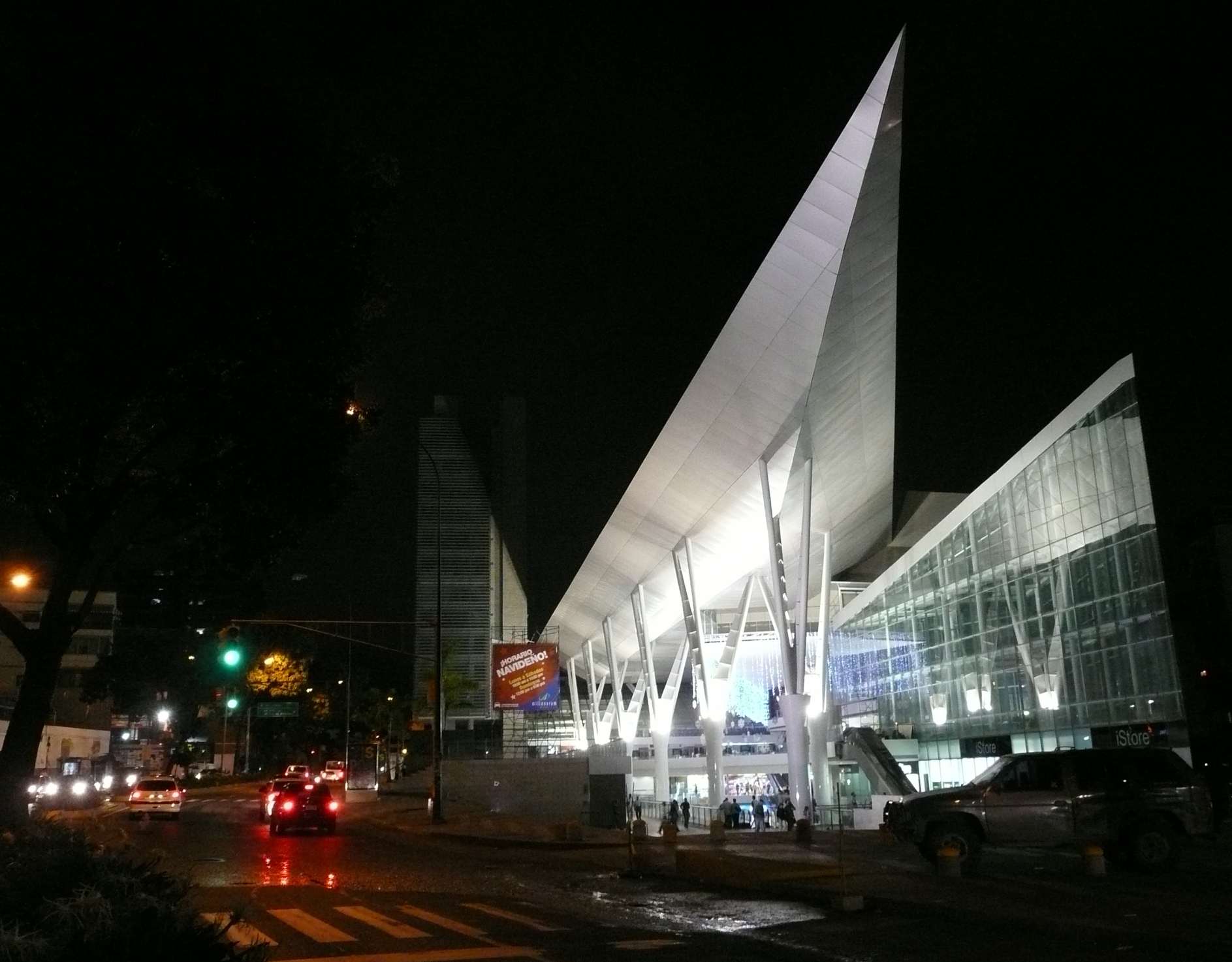
Millennium Mall at the Rómulo Gallegos Avenue

== Demographics ==
The Sucre Municipality, according to a 2016 population estimate by the National Institute of Statistics of Venezuela, has a population of 691,317 (up from 591,414 in 2000). This amounts to 2.2% of the state's population. The municipality's population density (2016) is about 11,000 people per square mile (4,200/km^{2}).

== Government ==
=== Mayors ===
Period	Mayor	% of votes	Political party	Notes
1989-1993	Enrique Mendoza		COPEI	First Mayor of municipality
1993-1995	Enrique Mendoza		COPEI	
1995-1998	Raoul Bermúdez		COPEI	
1998-2000	Raoul Bermúdez		COPEI	
2000-2004	José Vicente Rangel Ávalos	29.98	MVR	2000 Venezuelan general election
2004-2008	José Vicente Rangel Ávalos	50.91	MVR/PSUV	Re elected
2008-2013	Carlos Ocariz	55.60	Primero Justicia	
2013-2017	Carlos Ocariz	52.79	Primero Justicia	Re elected
2017	José Luis López			In charge of the office after Ocariz's resignation
2017-2021	José Vicente Rangel Ávalos	59.85	PSUV	

== Education ==
Colegio Japonés de Caracas (カラカス日本人学校), the sole Japanese international school in Venezuela, is in Sucre Municipality.
