= La Hoyada station =

Caracas Metro station in Venezuela

La Hoyada
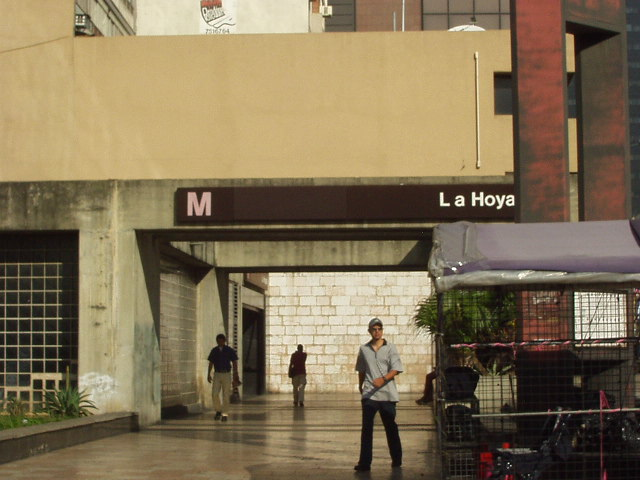
- Entrance to the station

General information
- Location: Catedral parish, Municipio; Libertador, Capital District; Venezuela
- Coordinates: 10°30′12.3″N 66°54′36.3″W
- System: Caracas Metro rapid transit station
- Operator: C.A. Metro de Caracas
- Line: Line 1
- Platforms: 2 side platforms
- Tracks: 2
- Connections: BusCaracas

Construction
- Structure type: underground

History
- Opened: 2 January 1983

Services
Preceding station	Caracas Metro	Following station
Capitolio toward Propatria	Line 1	Parque Carabobo toward Palo Verde
Location

La Hoyada is a Caracas Metro station on Line 1. It was opened on 2 January 1983 as the eastern terminus of the inaugural section of Line 1 between Propatria and La Hoyada. On 27 March 1983 the line was extended to Chacaíto. The station is between Capitolio and Parque Carabobo.
