= Palo Verde station =

Caracas metro station

Palo Verde
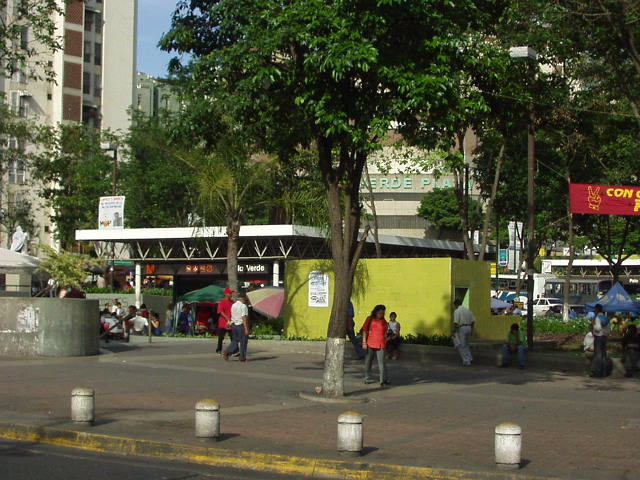
- Entrance to the station

General information
- Location: Sucre, Miranda; Venezuela
- Coordinates: 10°28′43.4″N 66°47′54.6″W
- System: Caracas Metro rapid transit station
- Operator: C.A. Metro de Caracas
- Line: Line 1
- Platforms: 2 side platforms
- Tracks: 2
- Connections: MetroCable

Construction
- Structure type: underground

History
- Opened: 10 November 1989

Services
Preceding station	Caracas Metro	Following station
Petare toward Propatria	Line 1	Terminus
Location

Palo Verde is a Caracas Metro station on Line 1. It was opened on 10 November 1989 as part of the extension of Line 1 from Los Dos Caminos to Palo Verde. It serves as the easter terminus of the line. The adjacent station is Petare.
