= Propatria station =

Caracas Metro station in Venezuela

Propatria
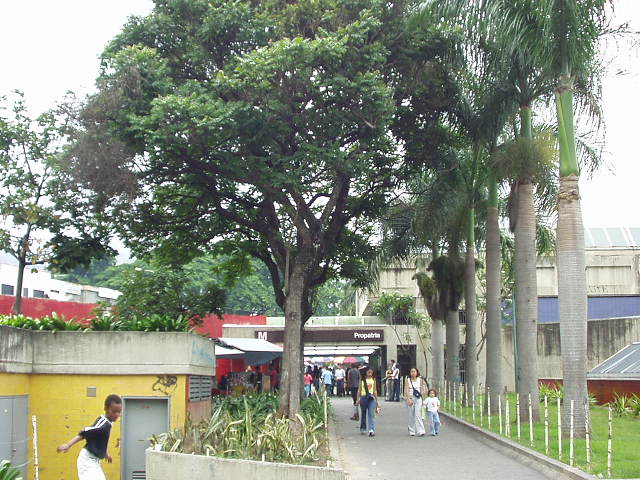
- View of the Station

General information
- Location: Sucre parish, Municipio; Libertador, Capital District; Venezuela
- Coordinates: 10°30′24.1″N 66°57′17.3″W
- System: Caracas Metro rapid transit station
- Operator: C.A. Metro de Caracas
- Line: Line 1
- Platforms: 1 island platform
- Tracks: 2

Construction
- Structure type: underground

History
- Opened: 2 January 1983

Services
Preceding station	Caracas Metro	Following station
Terminus	Line 1	Pérez Bonalde toward Palo Verde
Location

Propatria is a Caracas Metro station on Line 1. It was opened on 2 January 1983 as part of the inaugural section of Line 1 between Propatria and La Hoyada, and is located on Avenida 2 de Propatria. It serves as the western terminus of the line. The following station is Pérez Bonalde. Trains run from the station every three minutes.

Since December 2019, the metro line has faced technical issues, frequently reducing service to the station.
