= East Caracas =

East
- Municipalities of East Caracas
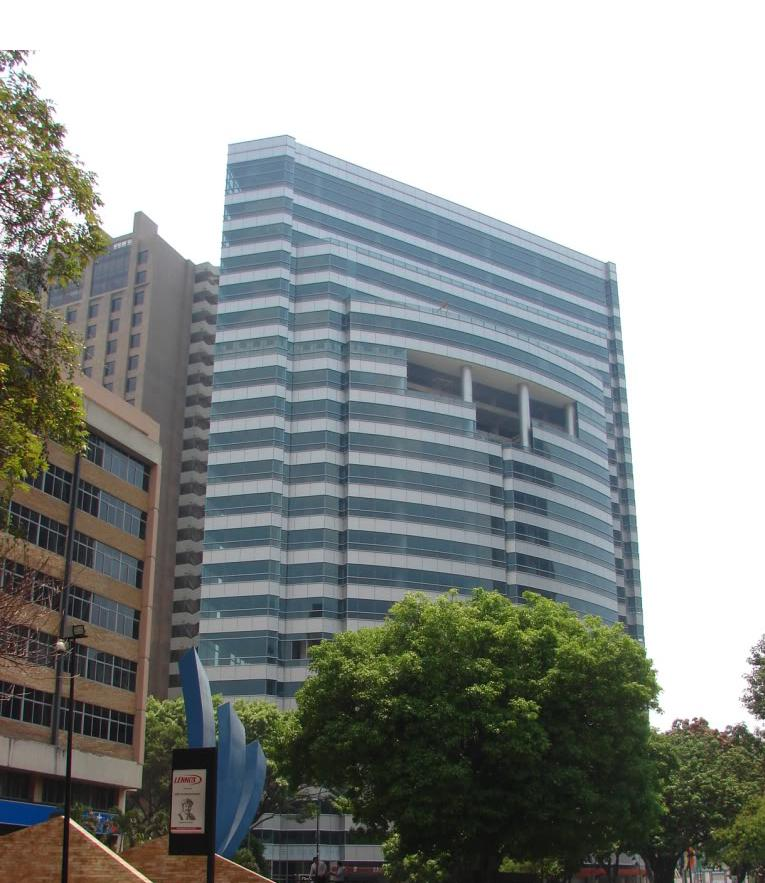
- Interactive map of East
- Coordinates: 10.25°N 66.52°W
- Sovereign state: Venezuela
- State: Miranda
- City: Metropolitan District of Caracas
- Comprises: Chacao, Altamira, Baruta, El Hatillo, Petare

Area
  - Total: 344.1 km^{2} (132.9 sq mi)

Population
  - Total: 1,140,756
  - Density: 3,315/km^{2} (8,586/sq mi)
- Time zone: UTC−4 (VET)

East Caracas generally refers to the eastern portions of Caracas, and may refer specifically to the municipalities from the Metropolitan District of Caracas located in Miranda State: Chacao, Baruta, Sucre, and El Hatillo. It concentrates the 34.8% population of the Metropolitan District of Caracas, and the 21.7% population of the Greater Caracas Area. Caracas Country Club, the richest neighborhood of the city, is located between El Recreo and Chacao districts.

Until some years ago, it was one of the safest regions of Caracas since most neighbourhoods on the eastern side had a slightly lower crime rate, but now the situation has changed. Crime is rampant in all the districts of the city. Some of the eastern neighborhoods of Caracas report a high rate of kidnappings, but also some neighborhoods in downtown such as San Bernardino.

== Geography ==
=== Limits and extent ===
Municipality	Baruta	Chacao	El Hatillo	Sucre
Location				
Major centres	Baruta	Chacao	El Hatillo	Petare
Population (2013)	326,377	71,085	74,006	669,288

=== Division ===
East Caracas is divided geographically in Eastern Caracas and Southeastern Caracas. The list of neighborhoods are:

- Eastern (Miranda): El Pedregal, San Marino, Campo Alegre, Chacao, Bello Campo, El Rosal, El Retiro, Las Mercedes, Tamanaco, Chuao, Altamira, Los Palos Grandes, La Castellana, La Floresta, Santa Eduvigis, Sebucán, La Carlota, Santa Cecilia, Campo Claro, Los Ruices, Montecristo, Los Chorros, Los Dos Caminos, Boleíta, Los Cortijos, La California, Horizonte, El Marqués, La Urbina, Terrazas del Ávila, Lomas del Ávila, El Llanito, Macaracuay, La Guairita, Caurimare, El Cafetal, San Román, Santa Rosa, San Luis, Santa Sofía, Santa Paula, Santa Inés, Los Pomelos, Palo Verde, Petare.
- Southeastern (Miranda): Valle Arriba, Santa Fe, Los Campitos, Prados del Este, Alto Prado, Manzanares, El Peñón, Baruta, Piedra Azul, La Trinidad, La Tahona, Monterrey, Las Minas, Los Samanes, Cerro Verde, Los Naranjos, La Boyera, Alto Hatillo, El Hatillo, Los Geranios, La Lagunita, El Placer, El Guayabao, El Volcán, La Unión, Sartanejas.
- Eastern (Libertador): Los Caobos, Las Palmas, San Rafael, Colina, Bello Monte, Sabana Grande, San Antonio, Las Delicias, Hoyo de Las Delicias, La Florida, Los Cedros, Alta Florida, La Campiña.
