= Landmarks of Caracas =

Locations in the capital of Venezuela

Caracas is the capital and largest city of Venezuela.

== Paseo Los Próceres ==
The Paseo Los Próceres is a monument located near Fort Tiuna and the Military Academy of the Bolivarian Army. On the promenade there are statues of the heroes of the Independence of Venezuela, as well as symbolic sculptures.

== Federal Capitol ==
The Federal Capitol occupies an entire city block, and, with its golden domes and neoclassical pediments, can seem even bigger. The building was commissioned by Antonio Guzmán Blanco and was built between 1872 and 1877, and is most famous for its Salón Elíptico, an oval hall with a mural-covered dome and walls lined with portraits of the country's great and good. The nearby Palacio Municipal de Caracas dating from 1696 was renovated in the Neoclassical style in 1906 and now serves as the city hall and the Caracas Museum.

== East Park ==
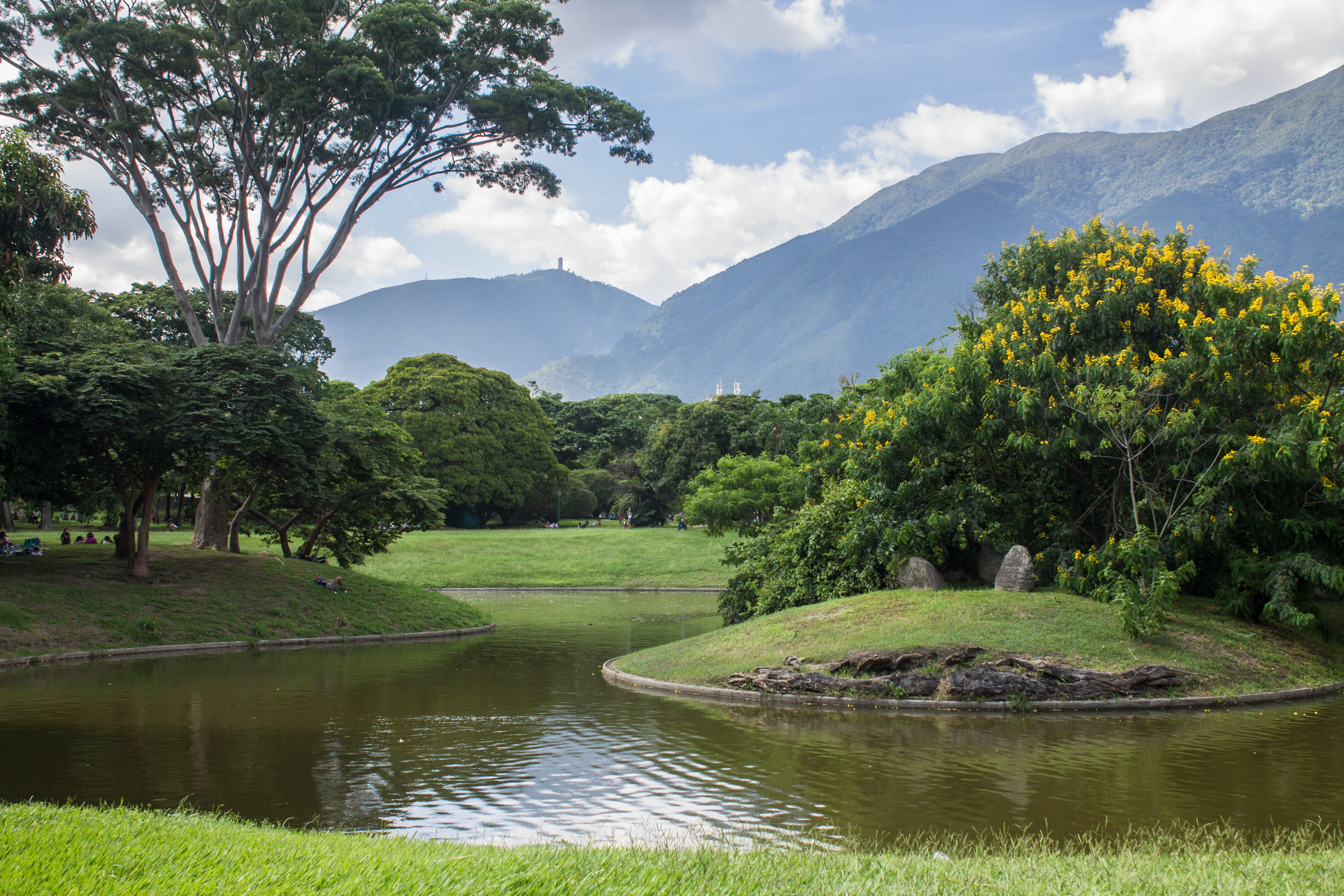
A view of the Parque del Este

The Caracas East Park (Parque del Este, now officially Parque Generalísimo Francisco de Miranda) was designed by Brazilian architect Roberto Burle Marx. It is a green paradise in the middle of the city, and it contains a small zoo. A replica of the ship led by Francisco de Miranda, the Leander, is in the southern part of the park. Before there used to exist a replica of the Santa Maria ship, used by Christopher Columbus in his voyages to America.

== Teresa Carreño Cultural Complex ==
The Teresa Carreño Cultural Complex (Complejo Cultural Teresa Carreño) is by far the most important theater of Caracas and Venezuela. The theater presents symphonic and popular concerts, operas, ballet, and dramatic works. It is the second largest theater in South America, after the Teatro Colón of Buenos Aires, Argentina.

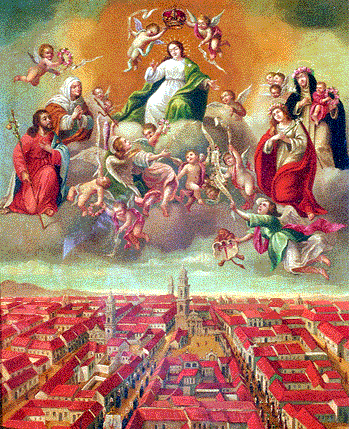
Colonial painting of Our Lady of Caracas, Patroness of the city, and below the city (circa 1766).

== Simón Bolívar's Birthplace Home ==
Skyscrapers may loom overhead, but there is more than a hint of original colonial flavor in this neatly proportioned reconstruction of the house where Simón Bolívar was born on 24 July 1783. The museum's exhibits include period weapons, banners and uniforms.

Much of the original colonial interior has been replaced by monumental paintings of battle scenes, but more personal relics can be seen in the nearby Bolivarian museum. The pride of the place goes to the coffin in which Bolívar's remains were brought from Colombia; his ashes now rest in the National Pantheon.

== National Pantheon ==
Venezuela's most venerated building is five blocks north of Plaza Bolívar, on the northern edge of the old town. Formerly a church, the building was given its new purpose as the final resting place for eminent Venezuelans by Antonio Guzmán Blanco in 1874.

== Parque Central Complex ==
At a short distance east of Plaza Bolívar is Parque Central, a concrete complex of five high-rise residential slabs of somewhat apocalyptic-appearing architecture, crowned by two 56-storey octagonal towers, one of them is under repair due to the fire which burned the building on 17 October 2004.

Parque Central is Caracas' art and culture hub, with museums, cinemas and the Teresa Carreño Cultural Complex. The West Tower balcony, on the 52nd floor, gives a 360° bird's-eye view of Caracas.

== Public squares ==
- Plaza Bolívar is the focus of the old town with the monument to El Libertador, Simón Bolívar, at its heart. Modern high-rise buildings have overpowered much of the colonial flavor of Caracas' founding neighbourhood.
- Plaza Venezuela is the geographic center of Caracas. It is a large urban plaza at the entrance of the Central University of Venezuela. Kinetic artists have displayed their works there, including Carlos Cruz-Diez, Alejandro Otero and Jesus Soto. East of the Plaza is the Plaza Venezuela Fountain, a large computerized display of water, music and colored light refurbished in 2009 to include the latest available technology.
- Plaza Caracas was constructed in 1983. It is in the Simón Bolívar Center.
- Plaza San Jacinto dates to 1603 and used to be the site of the city market
- Plaza Los Palos Grandes is a modern construction located at the municipality of Chacao. It has a display of water and a beautiful coffee shop. this plaza is the center of free yoga lessons for all the people that want to enjoy the city outdoors. It also has its own library.

== El Hatillo ==
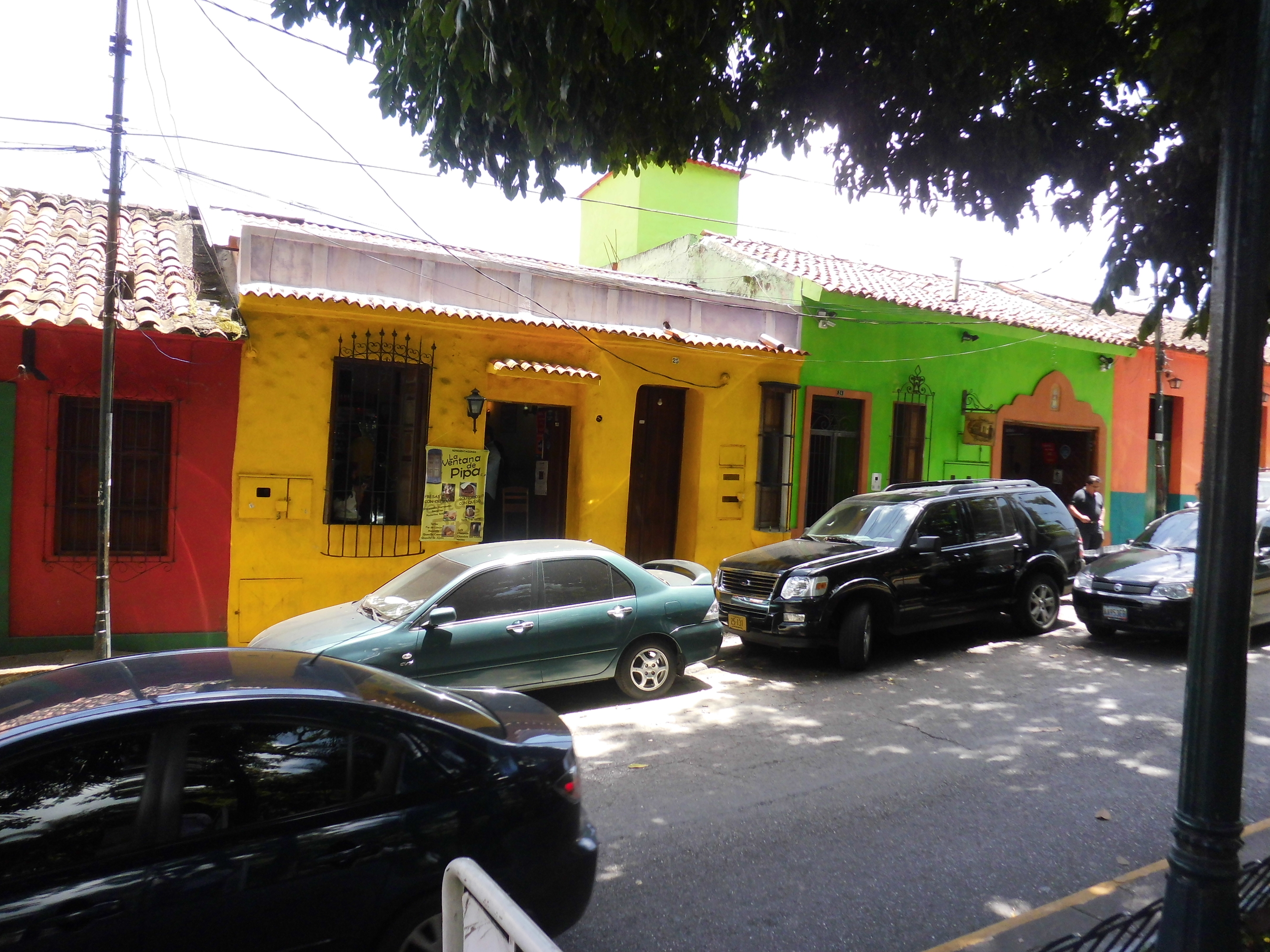
El Hatillo colonial neighborhood

El Hatillo is a neighborhood which was previously a colonial town, that is located in the south-east of Caracas in the municipal area of the same name. This small area, which is one of Venezuela's few well-preserved typical colonial areas, gives an idea of what Caracas was like in centuries past.

== Cerro El Ávila ==
Cerro El Ávila (El Ávila mountain) (Indigenous name: Waraira Repano) is a mountain bordering Caracas. It rises next to Caracas, separating the city from the Caribbean Sea. The area's highest elevation is Pico Naiguatá, at 2,765 metres (9,072 ft) above sea level. It is considered the lungs of Caracas due to the amount of vegetation on the mountain.

== Las Mercedes ==
This zone contains restaurants with varied gastronomical specialties, along with pubs, bars, pools and art galleries.

== Altamira neighborhood ==
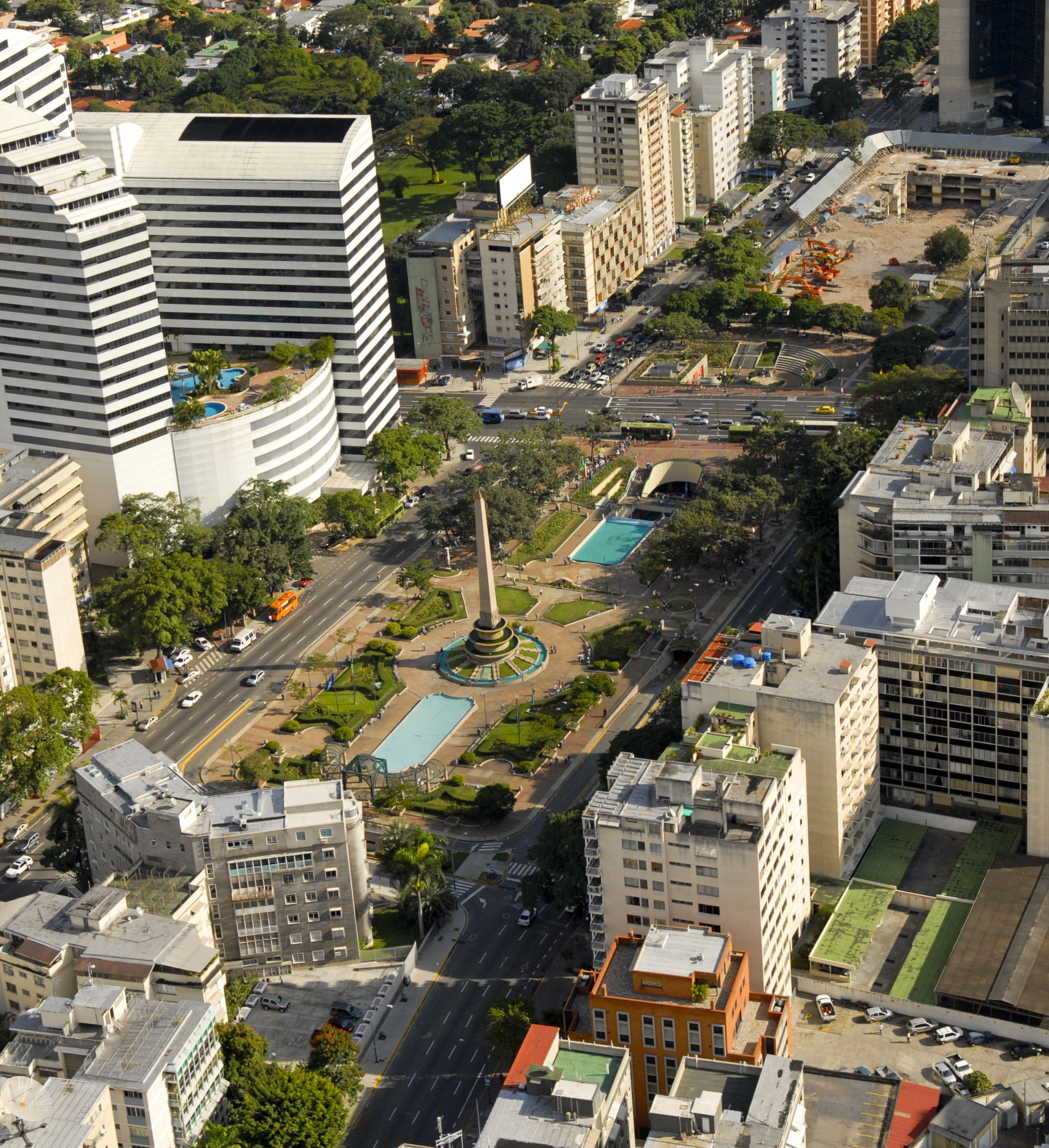
Plaza Francia in Altamira

Altamira is a neighborhood in the Chacao municipality of Caracas. It has its own Metro Station, many hotels, malls and restaurants, and is an important business and cultural centre. The Francisco de Miranda avenue (a major avenue in Caracas) and the Distibuidor Altamira (a congested highway exit) are both in Altamira.

== Religious buildings ==
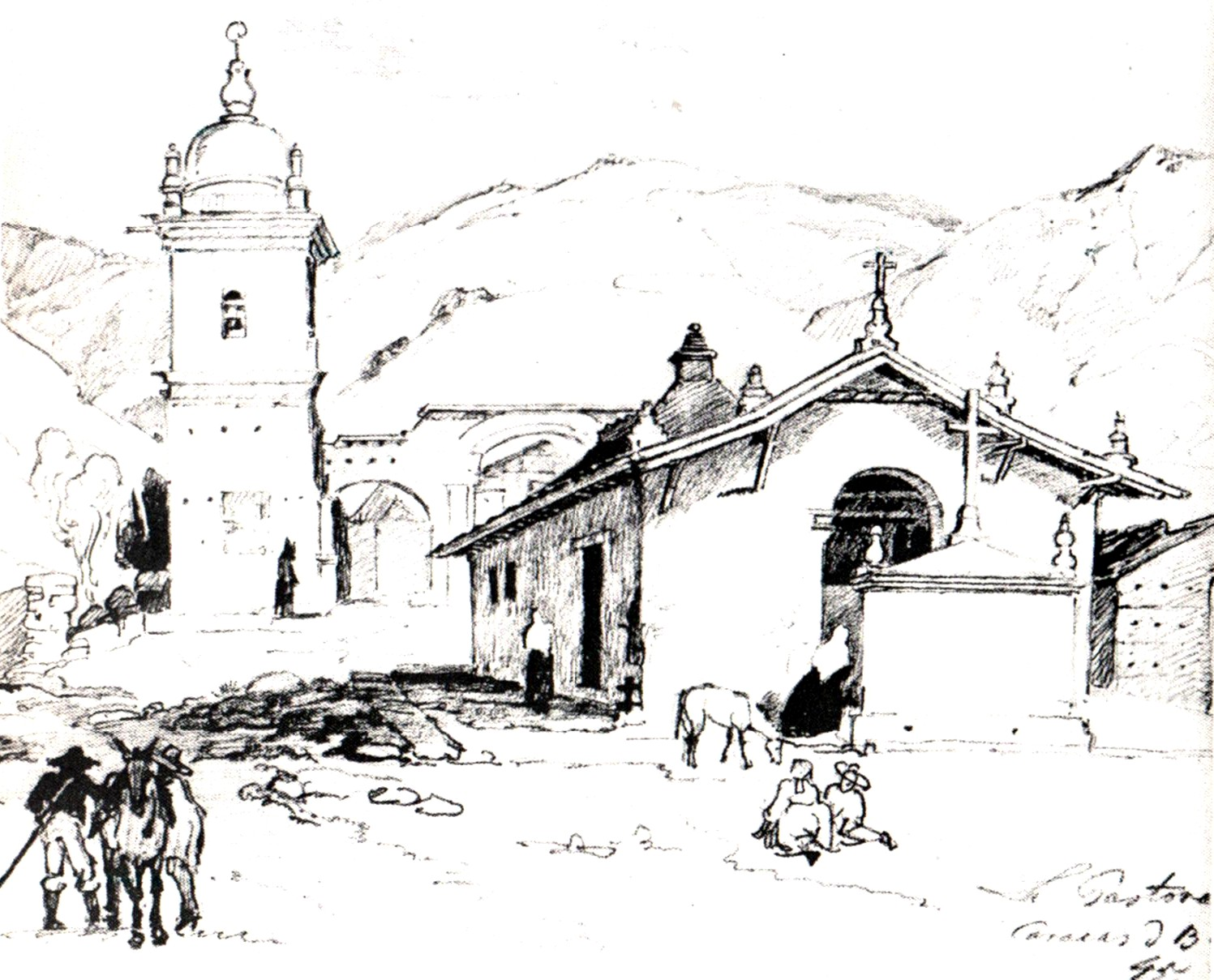
Church of La Pastora, ca. 1845 by Ferdinand Bellermann. Berlin State Museums.

The Iglesia de San Francisco is of historical value. Bolívar's funeral was held here twelve years after his death. Here he was proclaimed Libertador in 1813 by the people of Caracas. The church has gilded baroque altarpieces, and retains much of its original colonial interior, despite being given a treatment in the 19th century under the auspices of Antonio Guzmán Blanco, which was intended to be modernizing. It contains some 17th-century masterpieces of art, carvings, sculptures and oil paintings. The Central University of Venezuela, established during the reign of Philip V, was lodged for centuries in the church cloisters next door, which today are the seat of the Language Academy, and the Academies of History, Physics, and Mathematics.

Caracas Cathedral is the seat of the Roman Catholic Archdiocese of Caracas. Basilica of St. Teresa is designated a National Historic Landmark.

The Mosque of Sheikh Ibrahim Al-Ibrahim is the second largest mosque in Latin America. For many years it was the biggest.

The Union Israelita de Caracas is the biggest Synagogue for the Jewish Ashkenazi community in Caracas. Its mission is to host the religious services and preserve the memory of the Jewish heritage in Venezuela. Similarly, Los Caobos the biggest Synagogue for the Jewish Sephardic community in Caracas.
