= La Castellana, Caracas =

Neighborhood in Caracas, Venezuela

Coordinates: 10°30′12″N 66°51′21″W

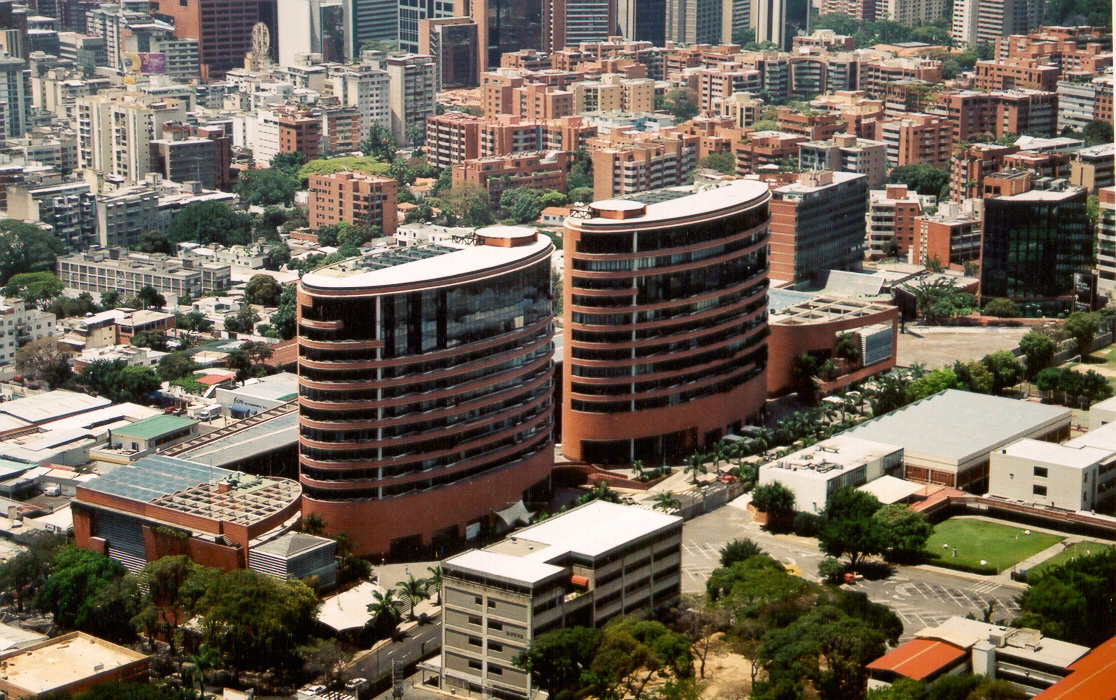
San Ignacio Center aerial view, located in La Castellana

La Castellana is a district in Caracas, Venezuela, located in the northeast part of the city, La Castellana is bordered on the south by Chacao, on the east by Altamira (Caracas) neighbourhood, on the west by Caracas Country Club and Campo Alegre neighbourhood and on the north by El Ávila National Park. It has an approximate surface of 98 hectares (0.987 square kilometers).

== Description ==
La Castellana is an important recreational, business and residential center of the city where the cost per square meter of real estate is one of the highest in the country. It is home of several five star hotels like Renaissance Caracas and Me by Meliá.

This neighbourhood also hosts the Centro San Ignacio which is a famous shopping mall that consists of five commercial levels, this mall is mostly famous by being the house of many fancy night clubs. It also has open terraces which houses local fast food services, sporting events, musicals recreational, textiles sales, varied restaurants and also a cinema complex which offers two 4D rooms, a VIP room and four conventional rooms.

== See also ==
- Centro San Ignacio
- Altamira (Caracas)
- Caracas
- El Rosal, Caracas
- Las Mercedes
- Chacao Municipality
- Miranda State
