= Escuela Campo Alegre =

- Caracas; Venezuela

Information
- School type: International School
- Established: 1937; 89 years ago
- CEEB code: 950290
- Grades: Nursery - Grade 12
- Language: English
- Website: https://www.ecak12.com/

Escuela Campo Alegre is a K-12 American International school located in Caracas, Venezuela. It was founded in 1937 in the neighborhood of Campo Alegre, but the school grew in such a way that it had to be moved to its present location in Las Mercedes. The school provides courses from the nursery level up through 12th grade.

== Background Information ==
Escuela Campo Alegre (ECA) is an international private school for expatriate and Venezuelan children located in Caracas, Venezuela in the district known as Las Mercedes. ECA has been open for over 70 years and every year receives students from all over the world. The overall student body is composed of students from over 25 countries and 30 different languages. On a yearly basis an average of 300 to 400 students are enrolled between the nursery age and the 12th grade (ages 3–18). Out of all the students that are at ECA, approximately ten percent of them are US expatriates in Venezuela. ECA teaches students that are in different grade levels by having different “sections” for each different portion of school. The high school portion is located in the main building, the middle school portion is located on the outside part of ECA over the cafeteria and next to the tennis courts, the elementary school section is located next to the soccer stadium on the east side of the school, and the preschool and kindergarten section of the school is located next door to the elementary section.

== Facilities ==
Tennis courts at Escuela Campo Alegre

The school campus includes a brand new three-story building opened in Summer 2012. The building includes a new early childhood center, multi-purpose rooms, three-floor fitness room, three new gymnasiums, and other PE facilities. On top of the building is a new astroturf field, which opened August 2011. The field measures 50 m x 100 m (professional size), with space at both ends. Also on campus are three tennis courts, two indoor basketball courts and one covered basketball court, all of which can also be used for volleyball, wall climbing and other sports. Fully equipped modern Library and Media Center, Technology Centers for each division, separate art, drama, and music centers for each division, A 4-story parking lot, 690-seat professional theatre, recording movie studio, wireless connection throughout the school, science laboratories for each division, modern cafeteria for the elementary school, middle school, high school, and faculty and staff. The school also has a pool with a large viewing gallery.

== Grade School Sections ==
Grade School Sections: The High School portion of ECA is made up of about 90 students in grades 9-12 and 20 faculty members that are in charge of the high school at ECA. The High School at ECA offers classes that would be offered here like classes for students wishing to pursue AP or IB classes. Classes are distinguished by the color of their shirts so when in high school at ECA students that are between the grades 9 and 12 must wear a beige shirt as uniform. Sports include swimming, soccer basketball,. As for after high school education students most students reach higher education by moving to The United States to go to college. The Middle School portion of ECA is made up of about 60 students between the grades 6 and 8 who because of the student distinction and uniform code must wear blue shirts to show they are in middle school. The Middle School portion of ECA is located just over one of the cafeterias located at ECA and is the portion of the school with the most outdoor classrooms. The ECA Middle School is a place where students work daily with real-life problems and issues. Our 8th grade experiences the wonderful city of Washington, D.C." The Elementary portion of ECA is located next to the soccer stadium and is made up of about 110 students between the grades of 1 and 5. The students in the elementary school must wear white shirts as their uniform and to be able to be distinguished as an elementary schooler. Apart from the normal elementary curriculum, which includes basic math and English classes, the elementary students are able to take part in after school activities. There are many other activities that highlight student success such as student-led conferences, winter and spring musical productions and much more .

== Notable alumni ==
- Joanna Hausmann
- Ellen Ochoa
- Jason Silva
- Corina Smith
