= Santa Fe, Caracas =

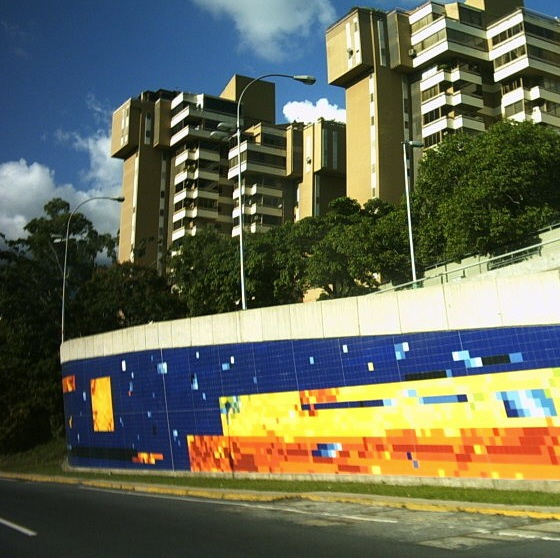
Jardín Luminico mural by Venezuelan artist Patricia Van Dalen.

Santa Fe is a neighborhood in Caracas. In 1959 architects Ernesto Fuenmayor Navas and Manuel Sayago completed the design for the Caracas Polyclinic, which was to be built on a 38,000-square-meter hill, but the project was not built. Between 1972 and 1982 Santa Fe Norte and Santa Fe Sur were built along with other residential developments in Caracas. The development was spearheaded by a group of doctors, the reason why many of the streets are named in honor of prominent Venezuelan doctors. The Santa Fe Shopping Center was built afterwards.

== See also ==
- Altamira (Caracas)
- El Rosal, Caracas
- Las Mercedes, Caracas
- Venezuelan Capital District
