= Campo Alegre =

Campo Alegre (Portuguese or Spanish: happy field) may refer to:

- Campo Alegre, a neighbourhood in Caracas, Venezuela.
- Campo Alegre, Oporto, a parish in Oporto, Portugal.
- Campo Alegre, Alagoas, a Brazilian municipality in the state of Alagoas
- Campo Alegre, Puerto Rico, a space for farmers' market in the District of Santurce
- Campo Alegre, Santa Catarina, a Brazilian municipality in the state of Santa Catarina
- Campo Alegre, an open-air brothel in Curaçao
