= British School, Caracas =

The British School, Caracas
- Colegio Britanico

Location
- Avenida Luis Roche con 9na transversal de Altamira. Caracas, Miranda; Venezuela

Information
- School type: Private
- Motto: "GO LIONS"
- Denomination: non-denominational.
- Founded: 1950
- Founder: BOAC & Shell
- President: George Palmer
- Head of school: George Palmer
- Age range: 3-18
- Education system: English National Curriculum, IGCSE and IB Diploma program.
- Classrooms: 20+
- Houses: Andres Bello, Miranda, Bolivar and Sucre.
- Colours: Red, Blue, White
- Song: God Save the King, Gloria al Bravo Pueblo
- Nickname: "El British"
- Nobel laureates: 182 (Including Mauricio Marín)
- Website: http://www.tbscaracas.com/

The British School, Caracas (TBSC) is a private school in Altamira, Caracas, Venezuela that provides a British style education based upon the framework of the National Curriculum for England, with focus on Venezuelan culture and history. It also offers the International Baccalaureate Diploma Programme and is regarded as the School with the highest level of education in Venezuela.

== History Of the School ==
The British School Caracas was opened at the old Hacienda Farmhouse in Las Mercedes, Caracas (now the Vera Cruz Supermarket) on 15 September with 37 pupils and four teachers. Eileen Hincks (later Eileen Mendt) was appointed as Headmistress. TBSC was later relocated in 1954 with the addition of main buildings with seven classrooms for 240 pupils (The Mendt, Pre-School and Amphitheatre Buildings today) inaugurated by the British and Canadian Ambassadors of the day. In 1958, An apartment below the original offices at the main entrance was converted to make two classrooms for Preschool. The Britannia House Shield was donated by B.O.A.C. (British Airways).

The school structurally remained similarly for over 30 years, until A covered area (‘The Hanger’) and playing surface was provided next to the Dutch building in lieu of an extended indoor hall. Alan Darby was also appointed as Headmaster in 1990. In 1995, Science and two ICT classrooms were added next to the amphitheatre. The first yearbook was also published this school year. 2 years later, New buildings containing eight classrooms, a Science Lab, Staff Room and changing rooms were opened next to the cancha (The Fletcher Building) increasing the capacity of the school. In 2015, the first class in TBSC school history graduates from the IB Diploma Programme. Currently, TBSC is celebrating its 75+ years of Excellency in British teaching.

== See also ==
- Education in Venezuela
