= Los Palos Grandes =

Neighborhood in east Caracas, Venezuela

Coordinates: 10°29′N 66°50′W

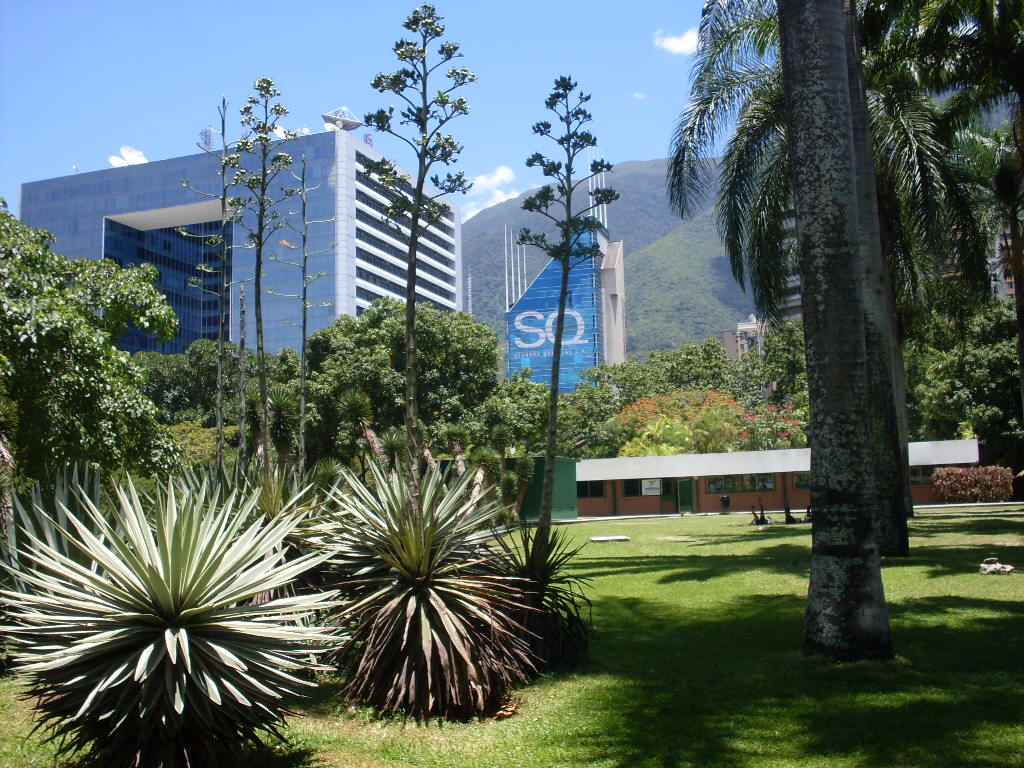
View of Los Palos Grandes, 2012

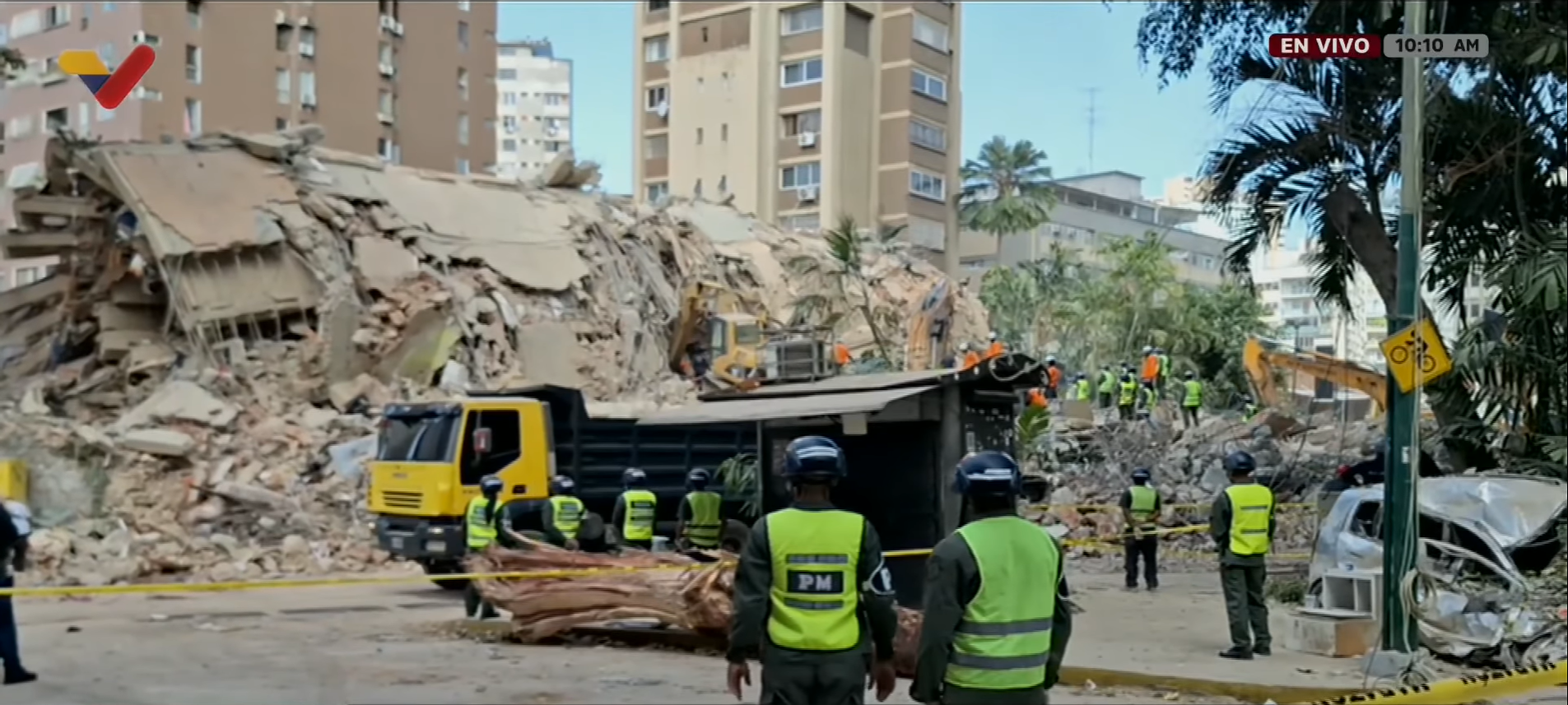
Los Grandes after the 2026 earthquake.

Los Palos Grandes is a residential, tourist and financial district located in the Chacao Municipality in east Caracas, served by the Caracas Metro through the Miranda station of line 1. It has an estimated area of 117 hectares (approximately 1.17 square kilometers).

This neighborhood constitutes a touristic spot of the city thanks to its large number of restaurants, cafés and recreational places, including East Park and the Los Palos Grandes square with its reading room. This neighborhood is also a part of the Financial District of Caracas, hosting several office buildings like Parque Cristal complex. This part of Caracas hosts the embassies of the United Nations, Uruguay, Ecuador and Dominican Republic.

Los Palos Grandes borders El Ávila National Park to the north, Altamira neighborhood to the west, Sebucan to the east, and East Park to the south.

== See also ==
- Altamira (Caracas)
- La Castellana, Caracas
- Chacao Municipality
