= Luis Roche =

Luis Roche was an important Venezuelan urbanist and was the Venezuelan ambassador to Argentina. He was also an amateur film director.

In the 1930s, Roche advocated for the redesign of Caracas, to include developed corridors to a multi-purpose center. His suggestion involved a 36-meter-wide avenue based on Avenue des Champs-Élysées.

He was responsible in great measure for the development of Caracas' east side during the 1940s. He contributed to the development of neighborhoods such as La Castellana, Altamira and La Florida.

Roche was a relevant diplomatic figure as well, being appointed as Venezuela's ambassador to Argentina. He married a Colombian/French lady by the name of Beatrice Dugand, with whom he had four children, Beatrice Roche, Lilianne Roche, Marcel Roche and Luis Armando Roche.

An important avenue in Altamira (Caracas) bears the name Luis Roche in his honor.
