= Marcel Roche =

Venezuelan physician ( 1920–2003)

- Born: 15 August 1920; Caracas, Venezuela
- Died: May 3, 2003 (aged 82); Miami
- Education: Johns Hopkins Medical School
- Awards: Kalinga Prize (1987)
- Scientific career
- Fields: Endocrinology, Nuclear medicine
- Workplaces: Central University of Venezuela, Venezuelan Institute for Scientific Research (1959–1969), International Atomic Energy Agency (1958–1960)

Marcel Roche Dugand (August 15, 1920 in Caracas, Venezuela – May 3, 2003 in Miami, US) was a physician and scientist.

He was born into a wealthy family of French origin. His father was Luis Roche. His secondary education was conducted in Paris, France, graduating in 1938. Following this, he moved to the US and got a Bachelor of Science degree at St. Joseph's College, in Philadelphia, followed by studies in medicine at Johns Hopkins Medical School, in Baltimore. After graduation in 1946, he specialized in endocrinology and nuclear medicine. Before returning to Venezuela in 1951, he carried out biomedical research for some time at the New York Institute of Public Health.

In Venezuela, Dr. Roche started several pioneering works as an assistant professor of the Central University of Venezuela on goitre, hookworm infections and nutritional deficiencies and anaemias, especially among the poor and aboriginal people.

He was founder and director of the Institute of Medical Research at the Central University, and in 1958 he also became the Secretary General of the Venezuelan Association for the Advancement of Science. Other institutions directed by him were the Institute of Neurology and Brain Investigation, reorganized in 1959 as the Venezuelan Institute for Scientific Research after succeeding Dr. Humberto Fernandez Moran in 1958. During his tenure, Dr. Roche became interested in, and supported the development of anthropology and the study of the history and sociology of science.

He was founder and director of the Venezuelan National Council of Scientific Investigation and the magazine Intersciencia, as well as being involved in the publishing of several other scientific periodicals. Dr. Roche was also a pioneer in the area of public understanding of science and a pioneer in the production of TV programs and documentary films on many science subjects. He was very active in promoting science to the public and participated in many national and international organizations promoting science. Dr. Roche was an advisor to the World Health Organization (WHO), UNESCO, a Governor of the International Atomic Energy Agency (1958–1960), and was a Member and President of the Council of the University of the United Nations in Tokyo, and Secretary of the Third World Academy of Sciences.

He received many honors and degrees from Belgium, Germany, France, the United States, India and Brazil. He won the Kalinga Prize in 1987 from UNESCO for his work. Asteroid 201497 Marcelroche was named in his honor.
