= Plaza Francia (Caracas) =

Square in Caracas, Venezuela

Coordinates: 10.4964°N 66.8490°W

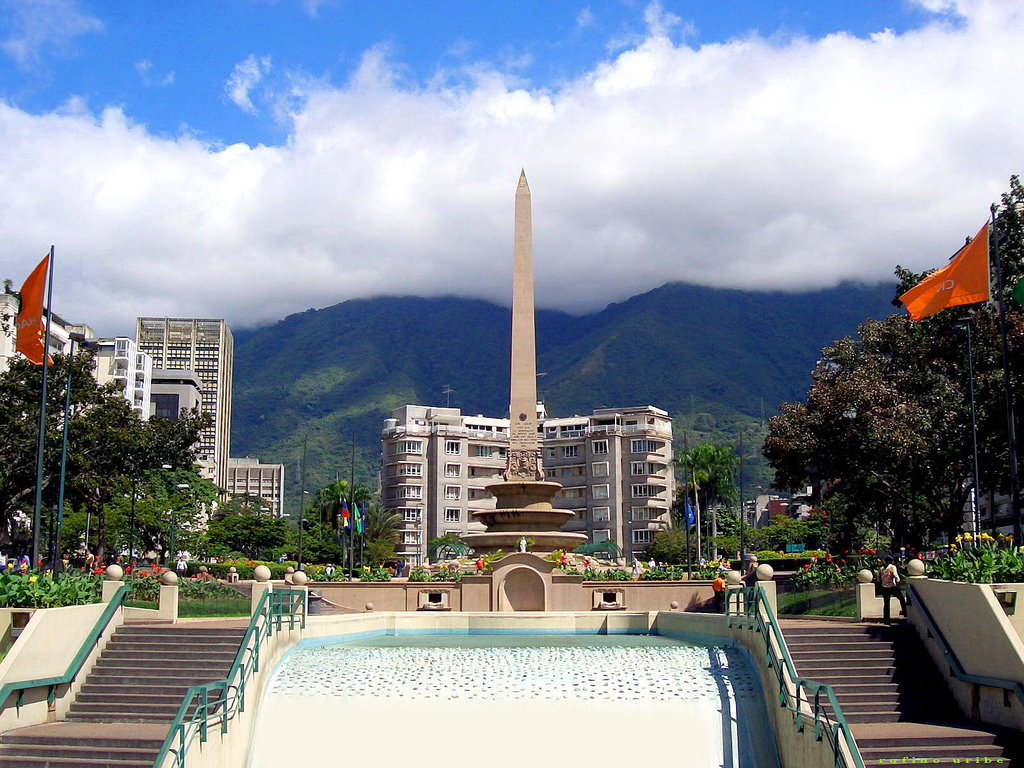
France Square

France Square (Plaza Francia in Spanish), also known as "Plaza Altamira", is a public space located in Altamira, east Caracas. It was built at the beginning of the 1940s and opened on August 11, 1945, with the original name of "Plaza Altamira". Its name was later changed due to an agreement between the cities of Caracas and Paris to have a Venezuela Square in Paris and a France Square in Caracas. This square was designed by town planner Luis Roche within the project of "Altamira neighborhood", a wealthy district of Chacao municipality in Miranda States.

In France Square stands an obelisk — one of the landmarks of Caracas — the water mirror and a fountain that falls till the bottom of the square, which has turned into a small shopping center and the main entrance of Altamira subway station.

In 2002, this square became the place where many people congregated in protest against the president at the time, Hugo Chávez, in a very big national strike known as the "Paro Petrolero".
