= El Rosal, Caracas =

Neighborhood of Caracas, Venezuela

Coordinates: 8°02′N 71°58′W

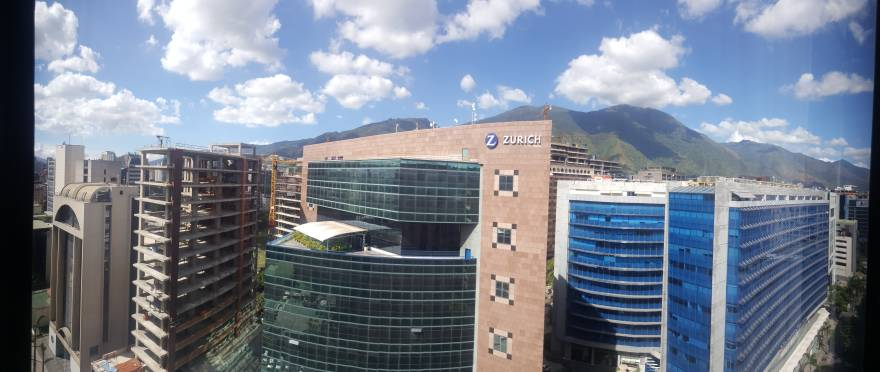
Francisco de Miranda Avenue, El Rosal.

El Rosal is a neighbourhood of Caracas, Venezuela, in the Chacao municipality. It is located at East Caracas, near the geographic center of Caracas and is one of its financial centres. It has an estimated area of 50.9 hectares (0.50 square kilometers)

== Economy ==
Prominent Venezuelan companies located in El Rosal, include Caracas Stock Exchange, Asociación Bancaria de Venezuela, Banco Nacional de Crédito, Banco Canarias, Banco Federal, Banco Occidental de Descuento, Inverunión, Stanford Bank Venezuela, BFC, Banco del Tesoro, Banco Confederado, Bolívar Banco, Helm Bank, Interbank Seguros, BFC Casa de Bolsa, Bancaribe and Banesco Seguros. International firms such as 3M and Bayer have also established offices there.

== Geography ==
El Rosal lies east of Sabana Grande district (Libertador Municipality), west of the El Retiro neighborhood, north of Las Mercedes and south of Chacaito, El Bosque and Campo Alegre neighborhood.

== See also ==
- Altamira, Caracas
- Las Mercedes, Caracas
- Sabana Grande, Caracas
- Campo Alegre, Caracas
