= Centro San Ignacio =

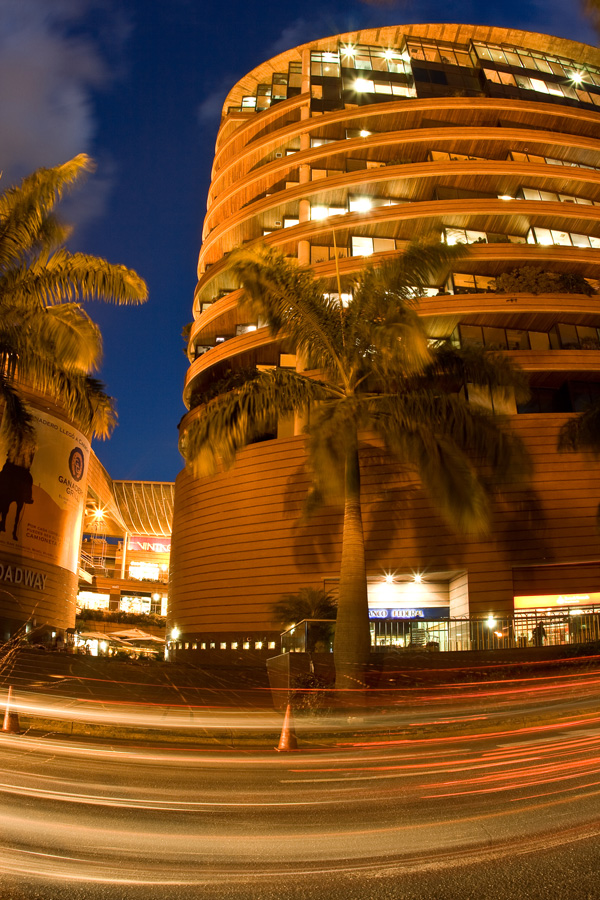
- Location: Caracas, Venezuela
- Coordinates: 10.4976°N 66.856°W
- Address: Blandín Avenue, La Castellana, Chacao Municipality
- Opened: 1998 September
- Developer: Developers: PGP Ingenieros C.A., under the leadership of Eloy Paredes Paoli Builders: PGP Ingenieros C.A. (Penzini, Grandini & Paredes), under the leadership of Eloy Paredes Paoli
- Manager: Construction Management: PGP Ingenieros C.A. (Penzini, Grandini & Paredes), under the leadership of Eloy Paredes Paoli Current Property Managers: Edgar Villegas, Fernando Acedo, Omar Becerra, Maye Albornoz
- Owner: Inversiones Bushels, C.A., Fondo de Valores Inmobiliarios.
- Architect: Carlos Gómez de Llarena & Moisés Benacerraf
- Num. of stores: 238 shops 45 restaurants 17 remodeling stores 10 kiosks 7 cinemas 340 stores total
- Num. of anchor tenants: 7 (Samsung, Converse, Merrell, Apple, Swatch, Havanna, Cinex)
- Floor area: 24,800 m^{2} (267,000 sq ft) commercial area 23,596 m^{2} (253,990 sq ft) office space 120.000 m^{2} (1,291.67 sq ft) total area
- Floors: 5 levels
- Parking: 4 levels, 2000 parking stall (28 for handicaps)
- Website: Centro San Ignacio

Centro San Ignacio is a Venezuelan shopping mall and office complex which opened in September 1998. It won recognition for Latin American contemporary architecture with the Mies van der Rohe Award that year. The mall is in La Castellana in the Chacao area of Caracas. It was built on athletic fields next to San Ignacio Jesuit College from early 1993 to late 1998, and is managed by the Fondo de Valores Inmobiliarios.

== Design ==
The Centro San Ignacio complex was designed by Carlos Gomez De Llarena and Moisés Benacerraf. It was recognized with a Mies van der Rohe Award for contemporary Latin American architecture because of its influence on the city skyline, and is among the most valuable real estate in Caracas and Venezuela. Its exterior has an open design to integrate it with its residential surroundings. The interior has a central open square known as Avila, overlooking the Ávila national park, which hosts a variety of events. Surrounding Avila's kiosks are corridors, terraces and areas for exhibitions and activities. At either end of the center are office towers; between the towers are five commercial levels and four underground parking levels.

Centro San Ignacio opens to the south for the road from the village of Chacao, allowing entry to the building from that area. This entrance is flanked by the two office towers: Copernicus on the west and Kepler on the east. A new road was necessary around the north side of the complex. The interior includes pergolas, bridges, terraces and vegetation—5,000 square metres (1.2 acres) of green space. Its exterior is red brick, with metal and granite. Tinted glass dominates the structure, especially in the office towers.

The commercial towers are elliptical, and that's why they are named after Nicolaus Copernicus (heliocentric theory) and Johannes Kepler (who proved that planets orbited the sun in an elliptical shape, not circular). Luis Penzini and Eloy Paredes helped architect design that shape.

== Commercial and office areas ==
Centro San Ignacio consists of five commercial levels: Blandín, Chaguaramos, Jardín, Terraza and Vivero. Chaguaramos and Blandín have sporting-goods, music and recreational stores; Jardín and Terraza feature clothing, electronics and general-consumer stores. Vivero has a variety of restaurants, a cinema multiplex with two 3D theatres, a VIP room and four meeting rooms.

The Las Vegas, Hollywood and Broadway sections of the Jardín level combine commercial and local craft vendors. The commercial levels total about 24,800 square metres (267,000 sq ft), with over 300 stores. The complex has a number of restaurants, which may also be accessed from the outside. It was designed with a green-energy infrastructure; thanks to its open design, it requires no air conditioning system normally necessary in a closed complex. The business area has 23,596 square feet (2,192.1 m^{2}) of offices in the Copernicus and Kepler towers, occupied primarily by corporations with a staff of approximately 3,000 (including technicians and executives). The office towers and parking levels accommodate people with disabilities with ramps, escalators and authorized support staff.

The commercial towers are elliptical, and that's why they are named after Nicolaus Copernicus (heliocentric theory) and Johannes Kepler (who proved that planets orbited the sun in an elliptical shape, not circular).

== Visitors, services and security ==
In 2010 an average of 10 million visits per year were reported. It is one of the most-visited areas of Caracas. Since its 1998 opening, the mall has focused more on entertainment.

Information about the mall (upcoming events and a store directory) is provided by its media office. Centro San Ignacio has four parking levels with over 1800 spaces, including 28 handicapped spaces. The mall has a shuttle service, which stops at the entrance to the center; its vehicles are identifiable by the mall's logo on top.

The complex is earthquake- and fire-resistant. Security is based on the concept of risk mitigation. Safety is managed by a monitoring and control center, Cecom, which maintains communications with the staff. The complex has a closed-circuit television (CCTV) system, a staff of 74 officers for the shopping area, and parking, panic buttons and metal detectors and motions detectors in the office towers and some shopping areas. The security staff works with national and municipal authorities.

== Gallery ==
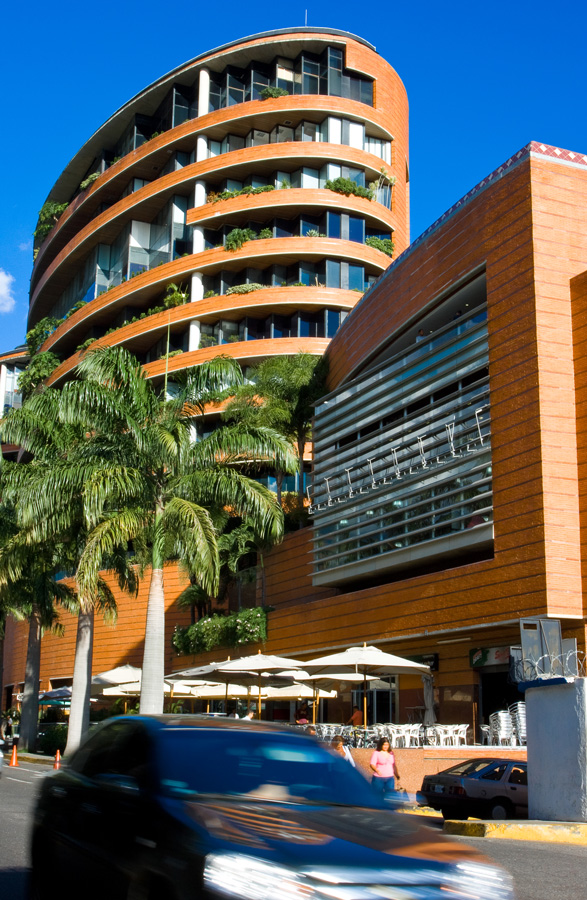
Morning view

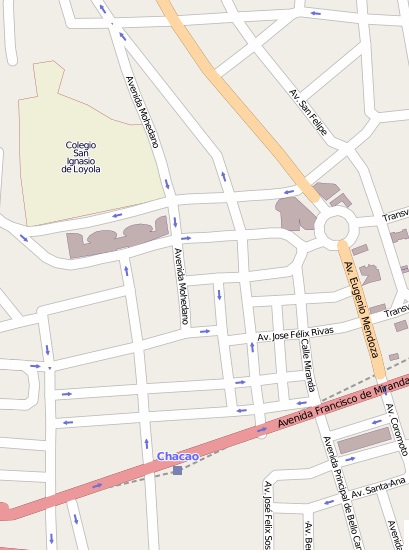
Centro San Ignacio, across from the Colegio San Ignacio

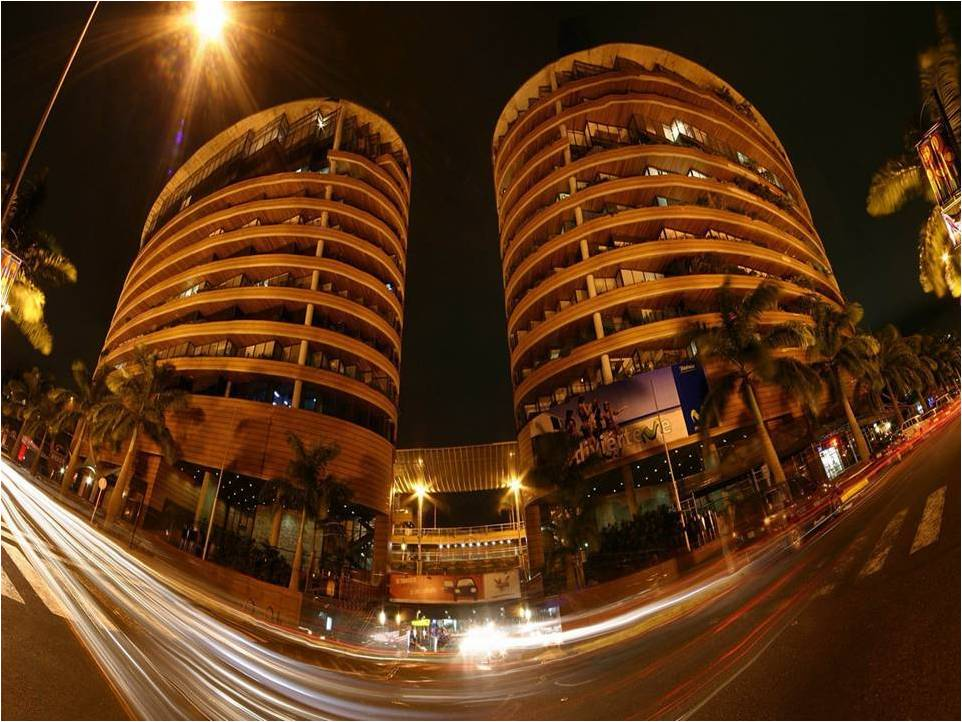
Wide-angle night view

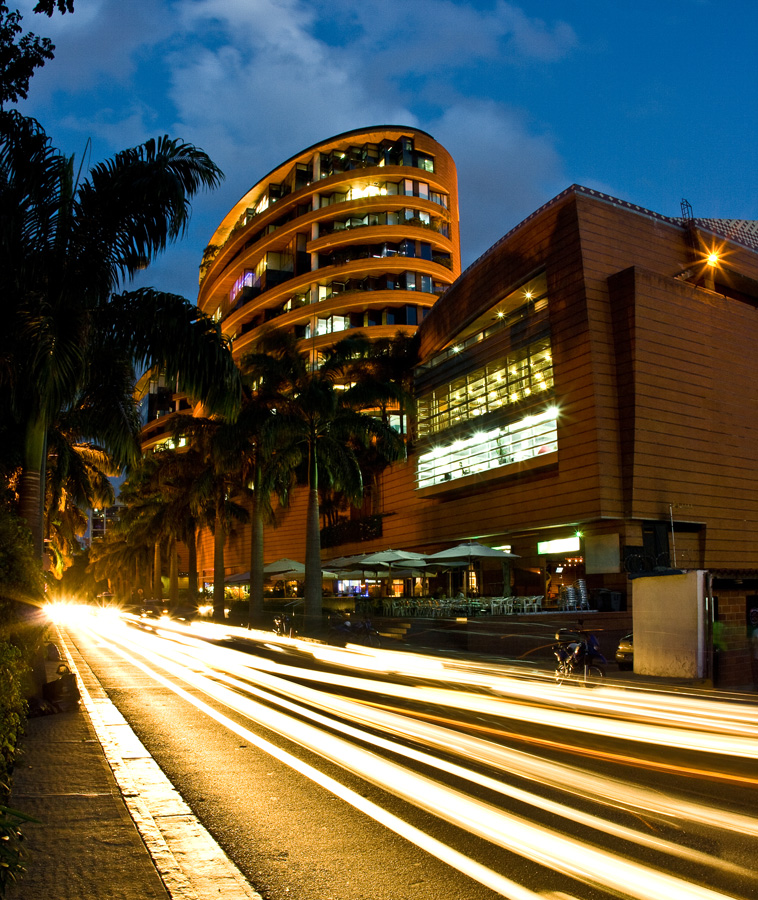
Los Chaguaramos Avenue, near the taxi stand

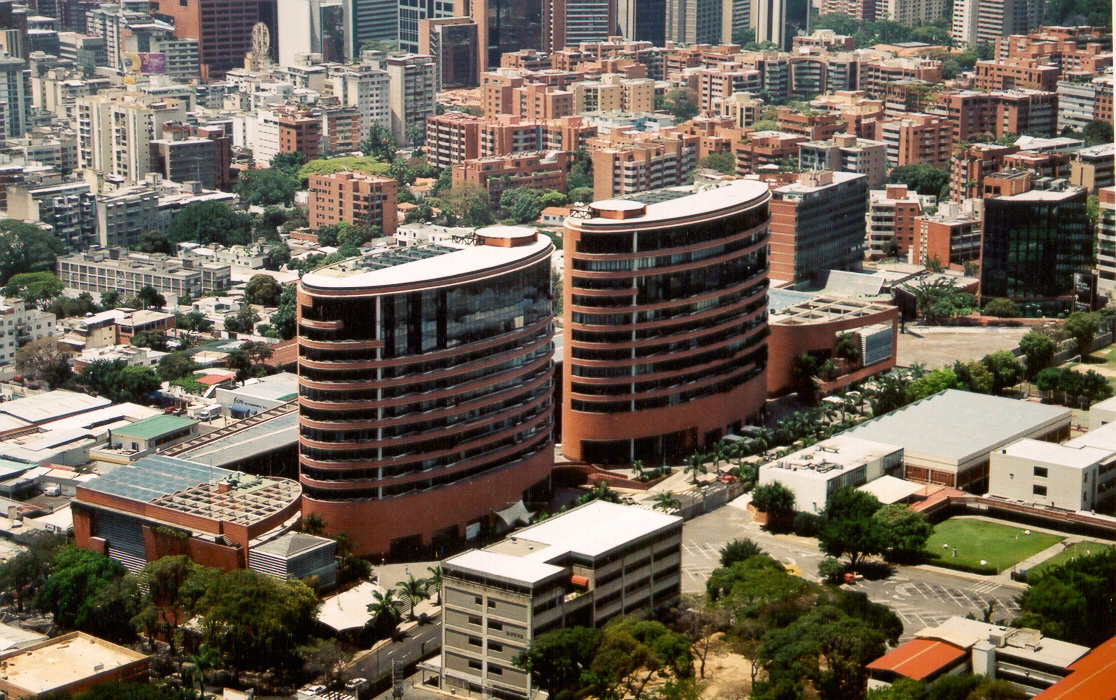
Aerial view of complex, in eastern Caracas

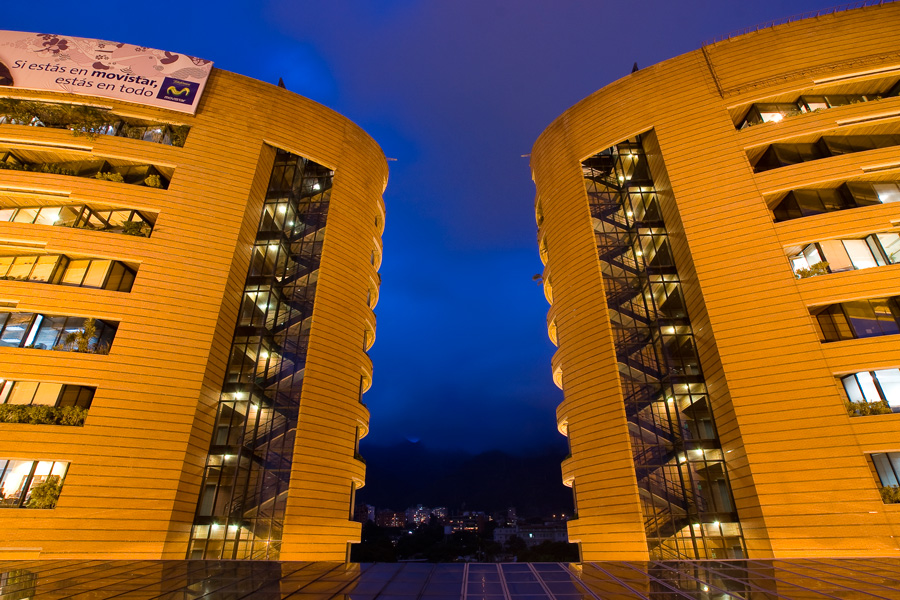
Towers office view
