= Campo Alegre, Caracas =

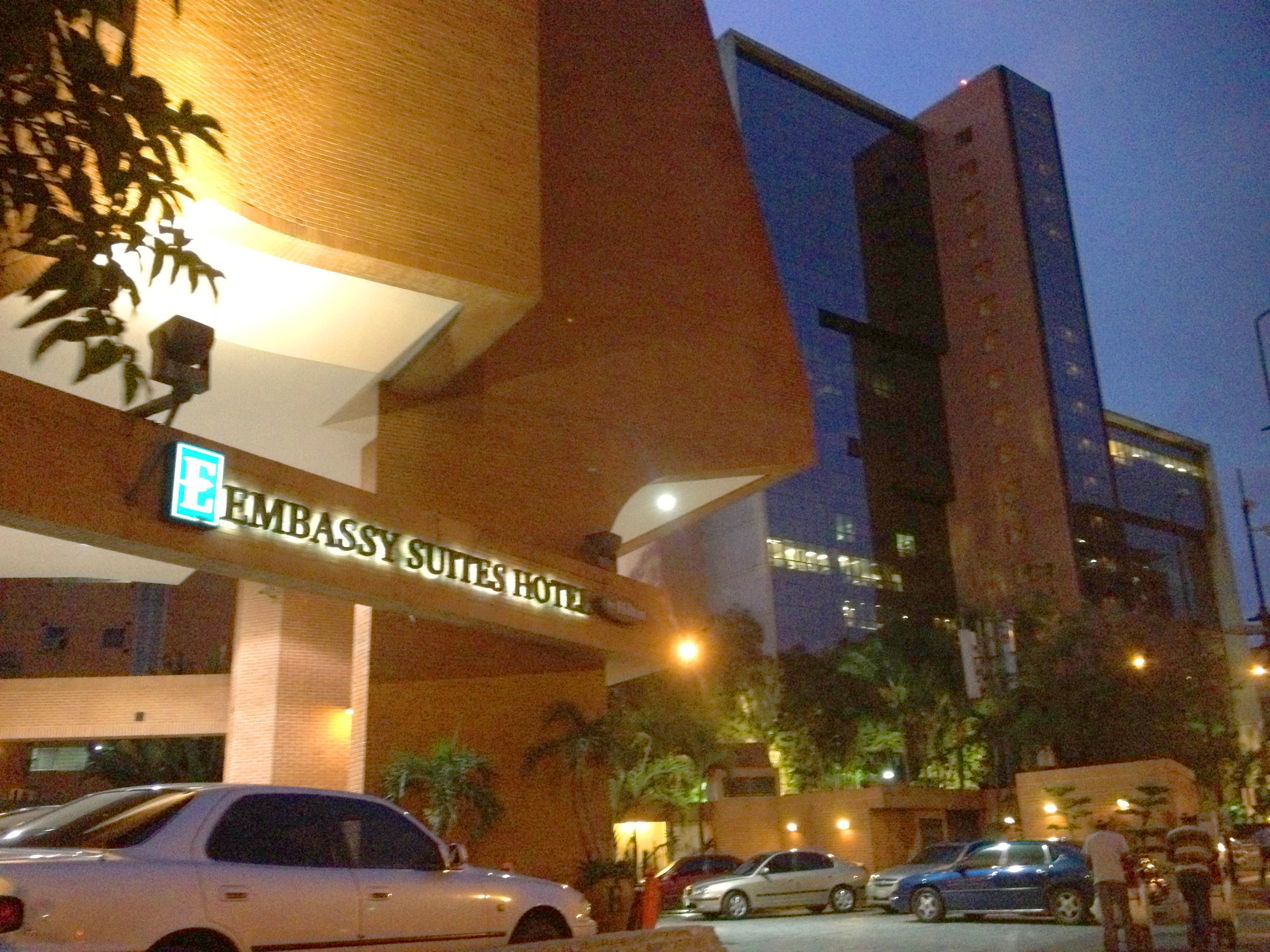
Embassy by Hilton Hotel and Edicampo tower in Campo Alegre neighbourhood, Caracas.

Campo Alegre is a residential neighborhood located in the Chacao municipality of Caracas, Venezuela. This district holds the hotel Embassy Suites by Hilton, and the most exclusive party room of the city, the "Quinta Esmeralda", meeting point of the Venezuelan upper-class families.

This neighborhood has, on average, the highest-priced real estate in the country and holds the embassies of Colombia and Portugal.

Campo Alegre borders the Caracas Country Club to the north and west, La Castellana to the east, and El Rosal to the south. It has an estimated area of 32.5 hectares (0.32 square kilometers).

== History ==
In 1932, the project "Campo Alegre", which the architect Manuel Mujica Millán named: "Plane of Garden City, Campo Alegre" (originally "Plano de la Ciudad-Jardín de Campo Alegre"). There we'll see many tree-lined avenues crossing each other between squares from which people can see modern country houses, neo-colonials neo-baroques, Néobasques... Despite the 'urbicide' that invaded Caracas in the late 20th century, Campo Alegre still keeps a little of the Garden City that Manuel Mujica initially designed.

== See also ==
- Altamira (Caracas)
- El Rosal
- Caracas
- Chacao Municipality
- Miranda State
