= Chacao Municipality =

Chacao Municipality Municipio Chacao
- Municipality
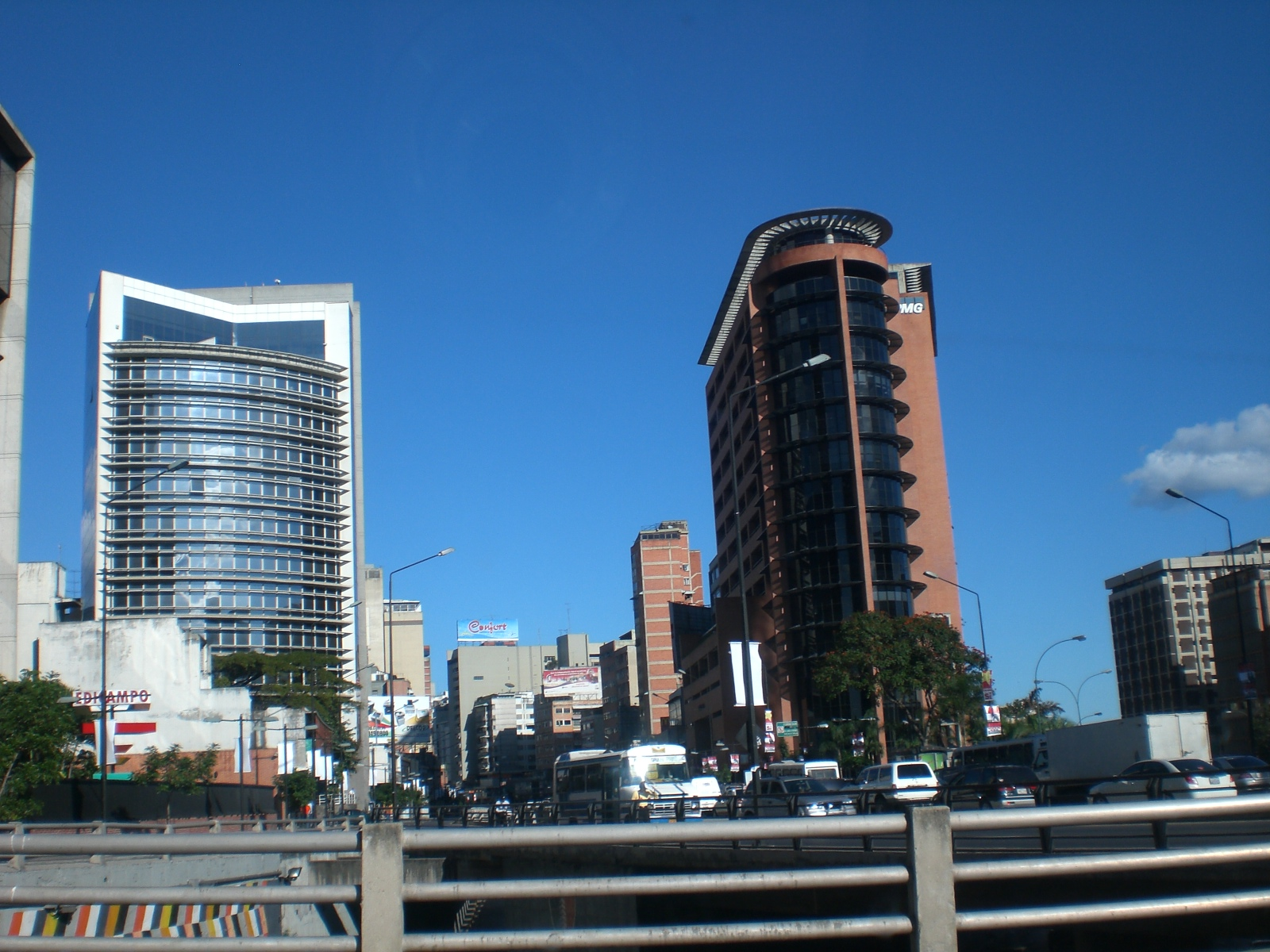
- Buildings in Chacao

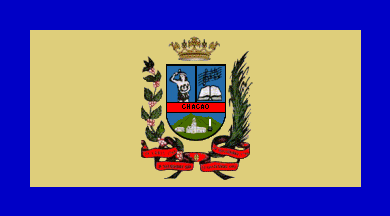
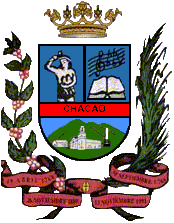
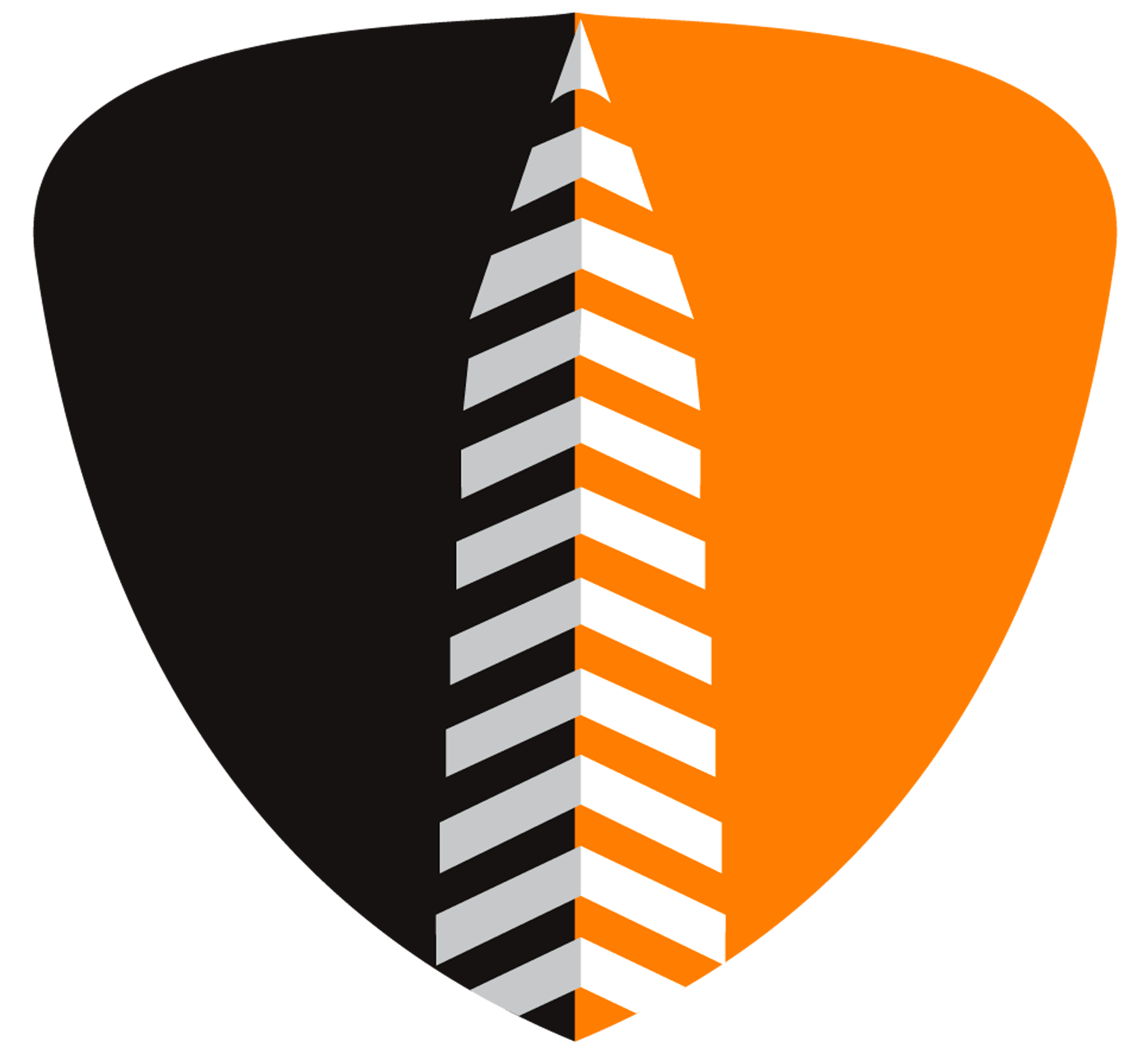
- Flag Coat of arms Official brandmark

- Location in Miranda

- Location in Venezuela
- Coordinates: 10°30′29″N 66°51′06″W
- Country: Venezuela
- State: Miranda
- City: Caracas
- Founded: September 27, 1769
- Incorporated: 1991
- Municipal seat: Chacao

Government
  - Mayor: Gustavo Duque

Area
  - Total: 12 km^{2} (4.6 sq mi)

Population (2001)
  - Total: 64,629
  - Density: 5,400/km^{2} (14,000/sq mi)
- Time zone: UTC−4 (VET)
- Area code(s): 0234
- Website: Official website

Chacao is one of the five political and administrative subdivisions of the city of Caracas, Venezuela. The other four are Baruta, El Hatillo, Libertador and Sucre. This legal entity is known as the Caracas Metropolitan District. Chacao is also one of the 21 municipalities that make up the State of Miranda, Venezuela.

== Geography ==
Chacao occupies the mid-eastern portion of the Caracas Valley, north of the Guaire River, bordering the other urban municipalities to the east, south and west, and the La Guaira state to the north, including the Avila National Park.

== Economy ==
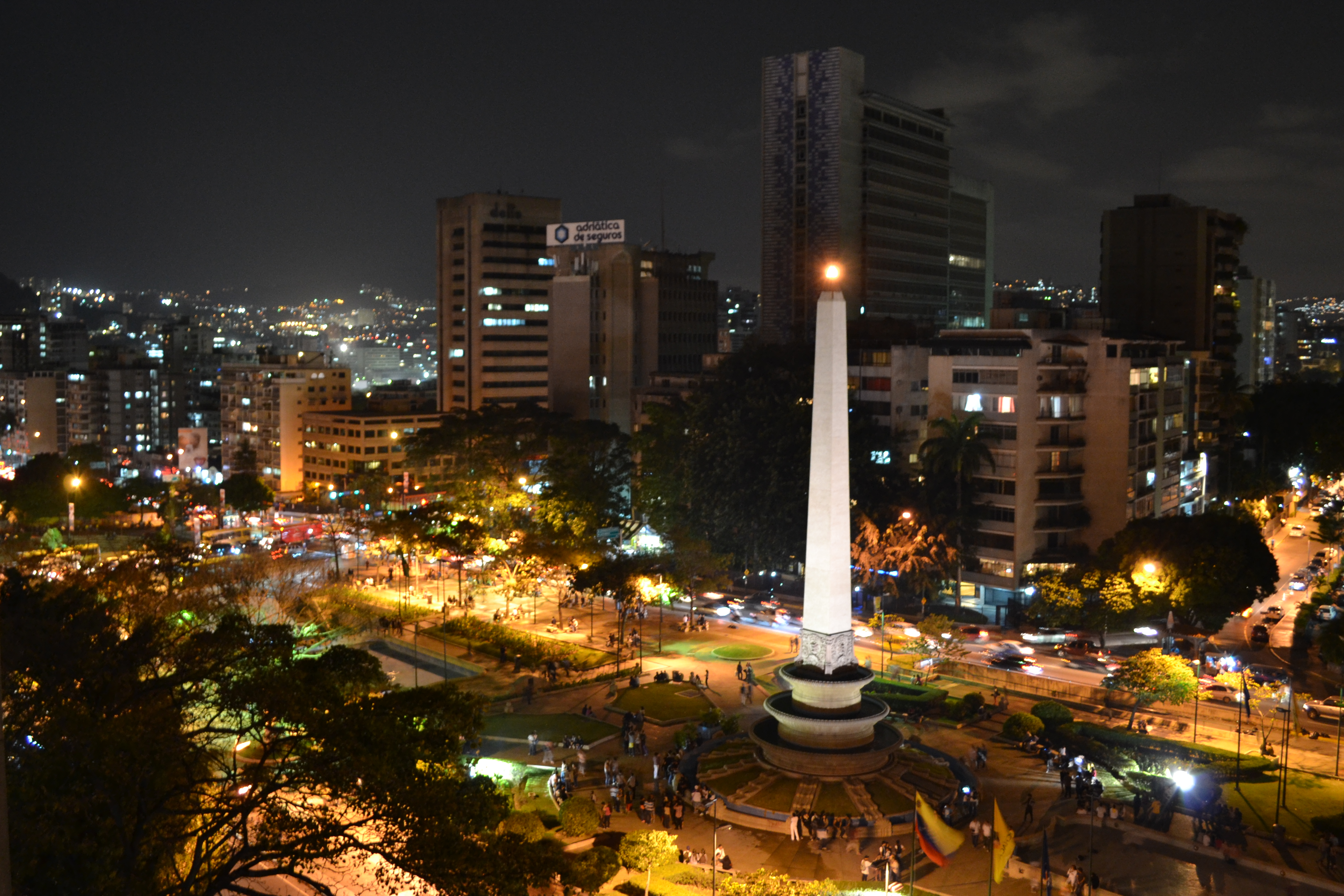
Plaza Francia at Altamira neighborhood

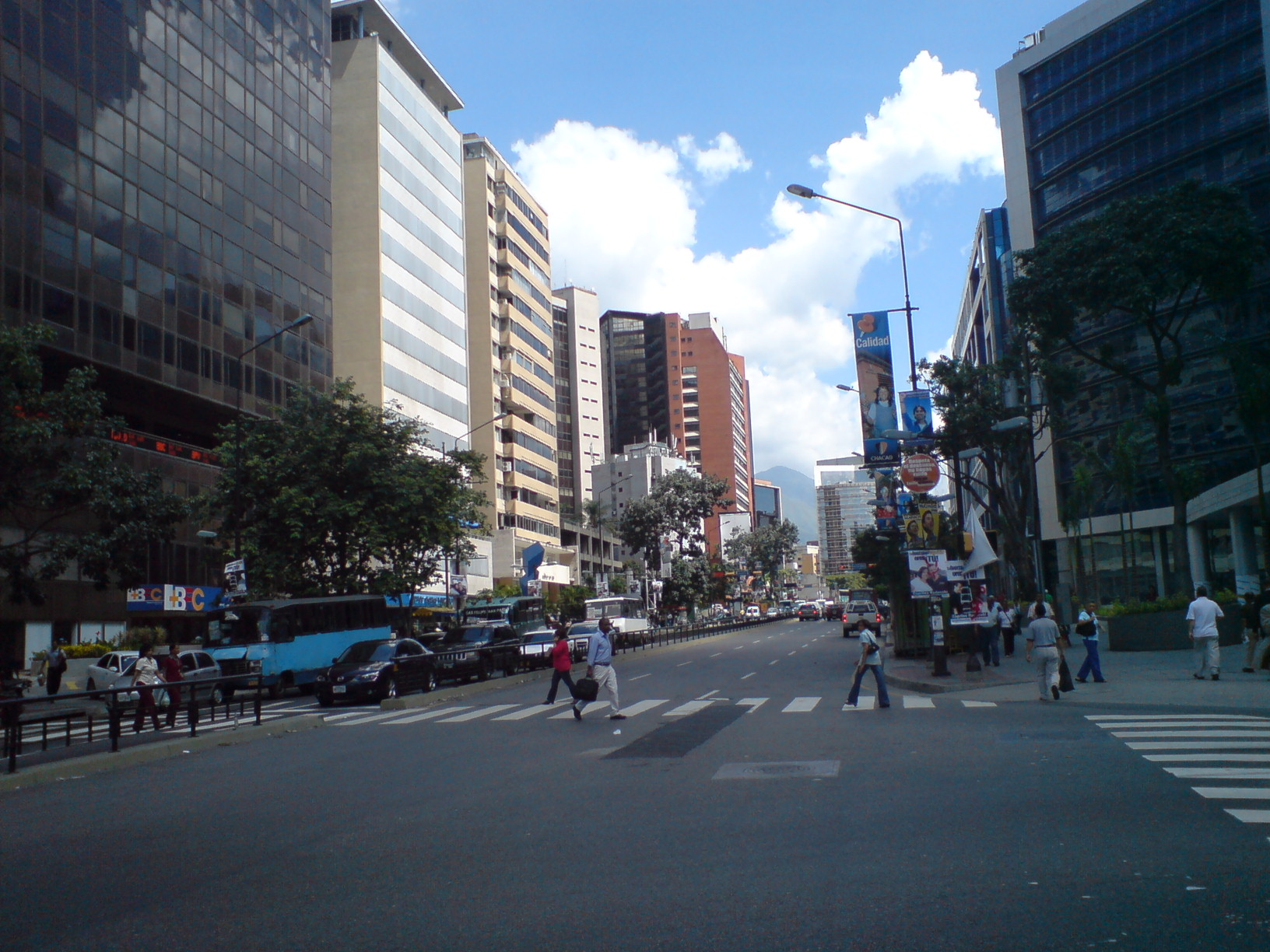
Francisco de Miranda Avenue

Chacao, along with Baruta and Los Salias, is one of the communities with lowest poverty rates in Venezuela, with a poverty rate of only 4.67% according to the 2011 census. It is home to some of the city's major financial and shopping centres, such as Centro Ciudad Comercial Tamanaco (CCCT), Sambil Shopping Mall, Centro Lido, Centro San Ignacio, as well as branches and headquarters of major local banks, and foreign institutions, stock exchanges, the most luxurious hotels in the city, and the mansions of recognized personalities in the political and economic sphere.

Many of the city's shopping malls are located within Chacao's borders. The township also controls the most transited pedestrian access to the Avila National Park (Sabas Nieves), a popular destination for caraqueños. Other attractions include a restaurant district in the neighbourhoods of La Castellana, Altamira and Los Palos Grandes, a Centre for Performing Arts (CELARG) and the Centro Cultural Chacao, a public space dedicated to concerts, art expositions, and other cultural activities. Parque del Este, the biggest urban park in Caracas, although largely in neighbouring Sucre territory, has one of its main entrances in Chacao, making it a popular recreational and exercise area for the inhabitants of Los Palos Grandes and other Chacao neighbourhoods.

The municipality has become a financial centre after many of the country's banks moved their headquarters to the formerly residential neighbourhood of El Rosal. The main street artery, Francisco de Miranda Avenue and its vicinity, rivals Caracas' old downtown in office space availability, and is preferred by foreign companies with established offices in the country. Some signature office buildings include Parque Cristal, Centro Letonia, HP Tower, Atlantic Building, La Castellana Center, Multicentro Empresarial del Este, Centro Lido, Centro San Ignacio, KPMG Tower, Forum Tower, Shell Tower, and other important architectural landmarks. Several other office buildings are occupied by government-controlled entities such as the Pequiven and Banco del Tesoro towers.

The traditional Venezuelan private sector has given way to new short-term businesses and franchises that bloom around the city thanks in part to soaring oil prices. Chacao is again an important player in this money wave craze, with commercial and residential real estate prices among the highest in the nation. The residential neighbourhood of Campo Alegre has on average the highest priced real estate in the country.

The headquarters of Estalar Airlines is in Altamira, Chacao.

== Demographics ==
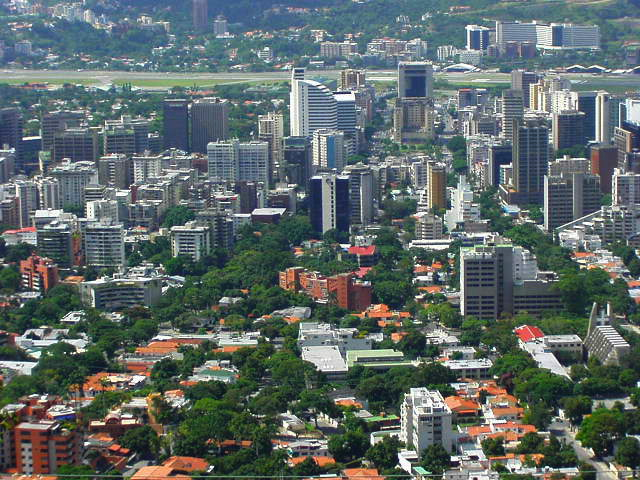
Altamira neighborhood

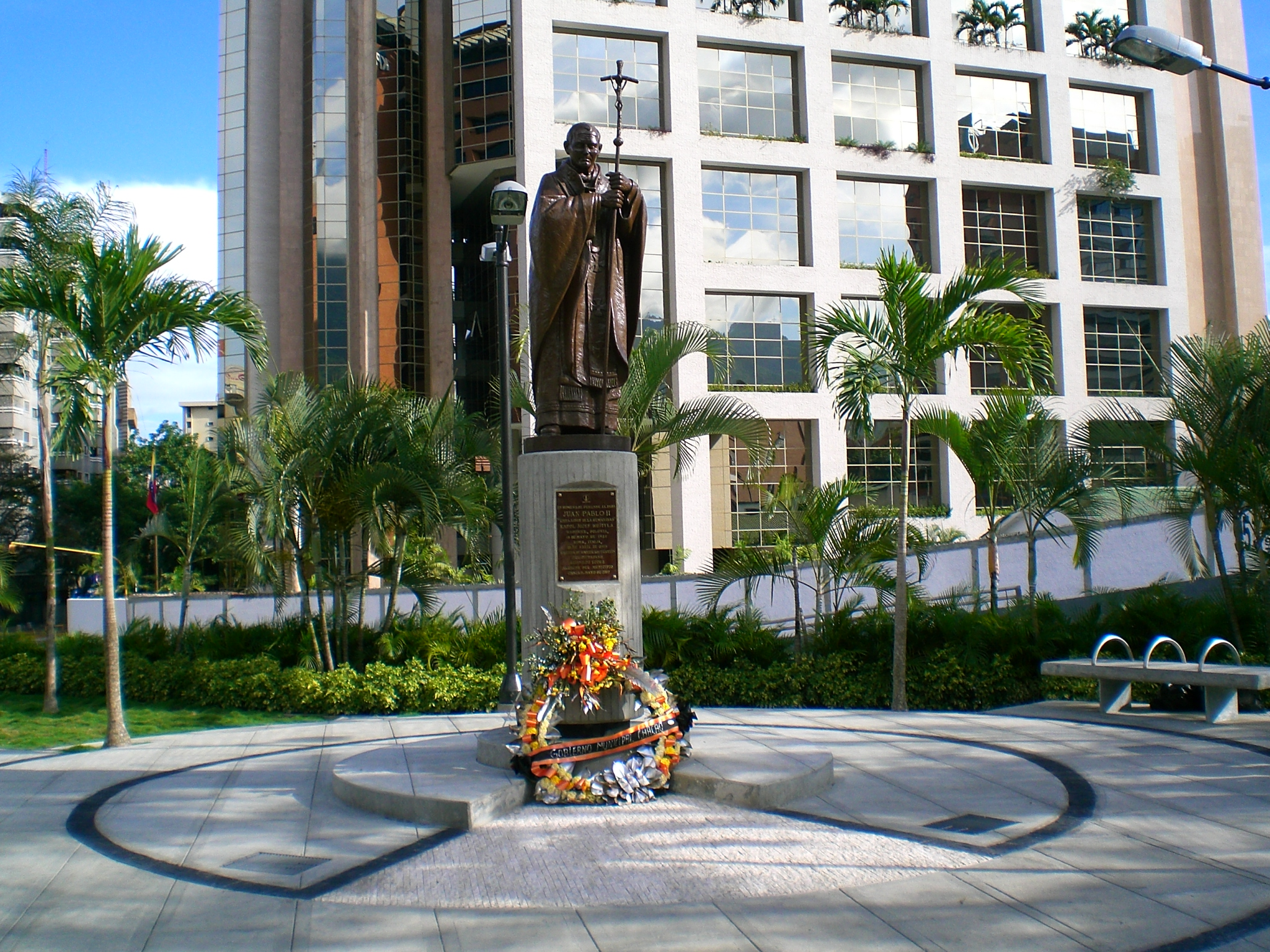
John Paul II square

The Cathedral and Bolivar Square area, known as Pueblo de Chacao was home to Spanish, Italian and Portuguese immigrant waves, and today represents a middle class stronghold in the municipality. Small pockets of poverty, known as barrios, are also present, some of the best known are Pajaritos and El Pedregal which are surrounded by luxury condos and opulent houses.

== Law and government ==
Former mayor Leopoldo López Mendoza, elected in 2000 and re-elected for the 2004–2008 term, has played a prominent role in anti-Chávez politics over the past eight years. On November 23, 2008, Emilio Graterón was elected mayor with 47,54% of vote. Chacao has represented a stronghold for the Venezuelan opposition. Anti-Chavez votes have steadily represented between 85 and 95% of the total votes in the borough, throughout the length of Chavez's administration.

The current Ministry of Aquatic and Air Transport has its headquarters in the Torre Pequiven. The Ministry of Transport and Communications previously had its headquarters in the Torre MTC in Chacao. The Junta Investigadora de Accidentes de Aviación Civil, the Venezuelan aircraft accident investigation agency, had its headquarters in Chacao.

=== Mayors ===
Period	Mayor	% of votes	Political Party	Notes
1992-1995	Irene Sáez		Copei / Democratic Action	First Mayor
1995-1998	Irene Sáez		Copei / Democratic Action	Re elected
1998-2000	Cornelio Popesco		Democratic Action	
2000-2004	Leopoldo López	51	Justice First	
2004-2008	Leopoldo López	79,56	Justice First / A New Era	Re elected
2008-2013	Emilio Graterón	47,54	Popular Will	
2013-2017	Ramón Muchacho	84,63	Justice First	
2017	Gustavo Duque			Appointed by the municipal council of Chacao
2017-2021	Gustavo Duque	63,66	A New Era	

== History ==
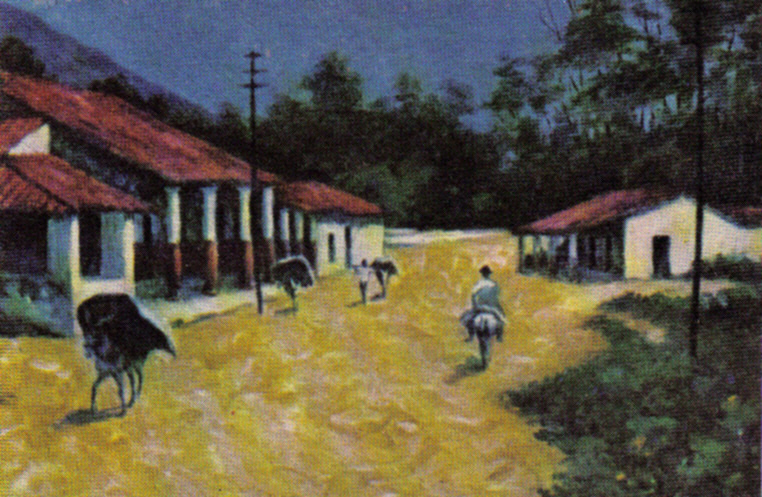
Chacaito at the end of the 19th century

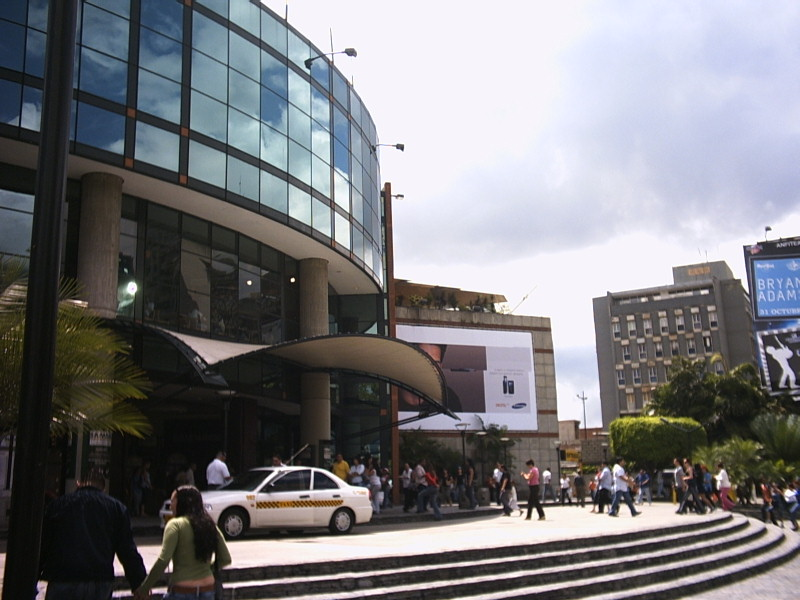
Sambil Mall

In Cumanagoto language Chakau (Chacao) means sand, the municipality was named after the Indian Cacique Chacao, who died defending his territory in 1567, the year when the city of Santiago de León de Caracas was finally established after more than three decades of unsuccessful attempts by the Spanish. The chosen location for Caracas Plaza Mayor and Cathedral was on the west side of the valley, making the fertile lands of Chacao (on the mid-east side) an ideal location for agricultural crops and establishment of haciendas. Spanish conquistador Diego de Losada, founder of the city of Caracas, included these lands in his jurisdiction.

The township of Chacao was founded by an immigration wave of the San Bernabé earthquake victims on June 11, 1641. It was officially made a Catholic parish with the foundation of San José de Chacao church.

After repeated epidemics and calamities affected Caracas, the Town Hall and the Governor and Commander in chief of the Province, Jose Solano y Bote, in 1764 thought about transferring the entire city to this location, an idea that was rejected by Caracas Bishop Mauro Tovar.

On April 15, 1769, the residents of Chacao asked for the creation of an independent ecclesiastical parish, Lieutenant Francisco Palacios y Sojo made the request, after evaluating the economic conditions. The final separation of Chacao from the Parish of La Candelaria was granted on September 27, 1769.

== See also ==
- Miranda State
- Caracas
- Municipality
- Venezuelan Capital District
