= Parque del Este =

Recreation park in Caracas, Venezuela

Coordinates: 10°29′48″N 66°50′28″W

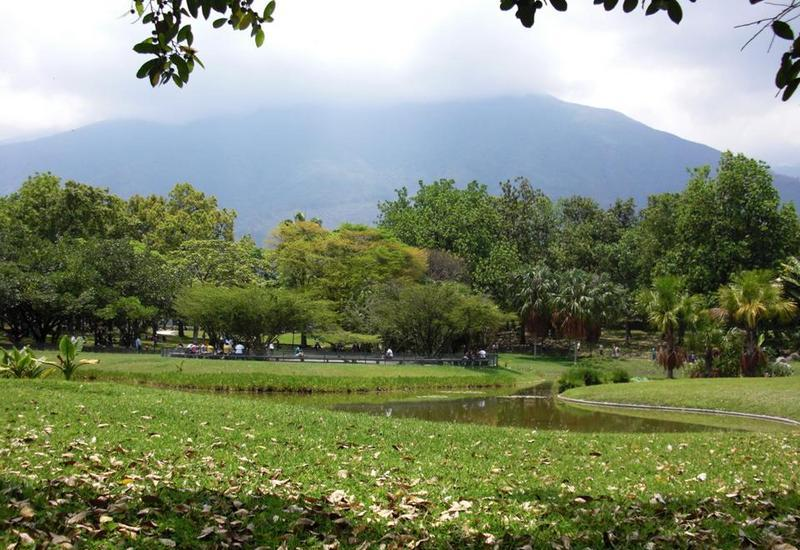
Parque del Este, Caracas

The Parque del Este (In English: "East Park"), renamed officially as Generalissimo Francisco de Miranda Park by President Hugo Chávez in honor of the Venezuelan national hero, is a public recreation park located in the Sucre Municipality of Metropolitan Caracas, Venezuela. Inaugurated in 1961, it is one of the most important of the city, with an area of 82 hectares (200 acres). The park was designed by a society formed by world renowned Brazilian landscape artist Roberto Burle Marx, Chilean landscape architect Fernando Tábora Pena and English-Venezuelan landscape architect John Godfrey William Stoddart.

The park is located just outside the Miranda station (formerly Parque del Este), on Line 1 of the Caracas Metro. The East Park is managed and supervised by the National Parks Institute (INPARQUES), an agency under the Ministry of Popular Power for the Environment.

The park combines three differently designed areas: the first is an open grass field with a gentle undulating topography, the second is a densely forested landscape with meandering pathways, while the third is a series of paved gardens with tiled murals and water works.

== History ==
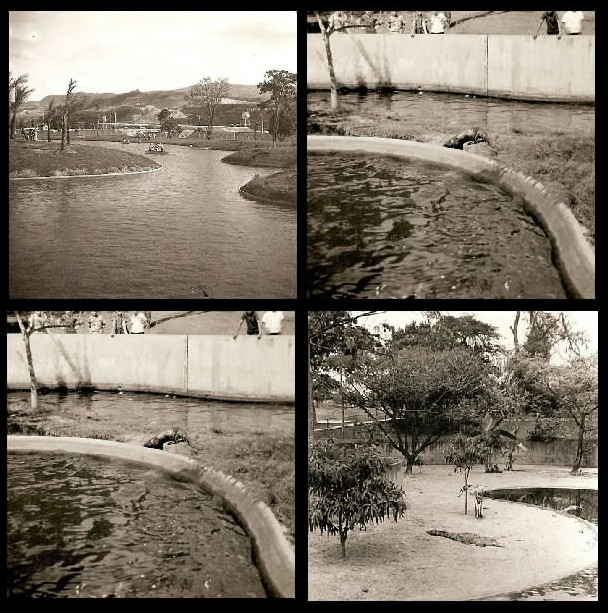
East Park facilities in the late 1960s

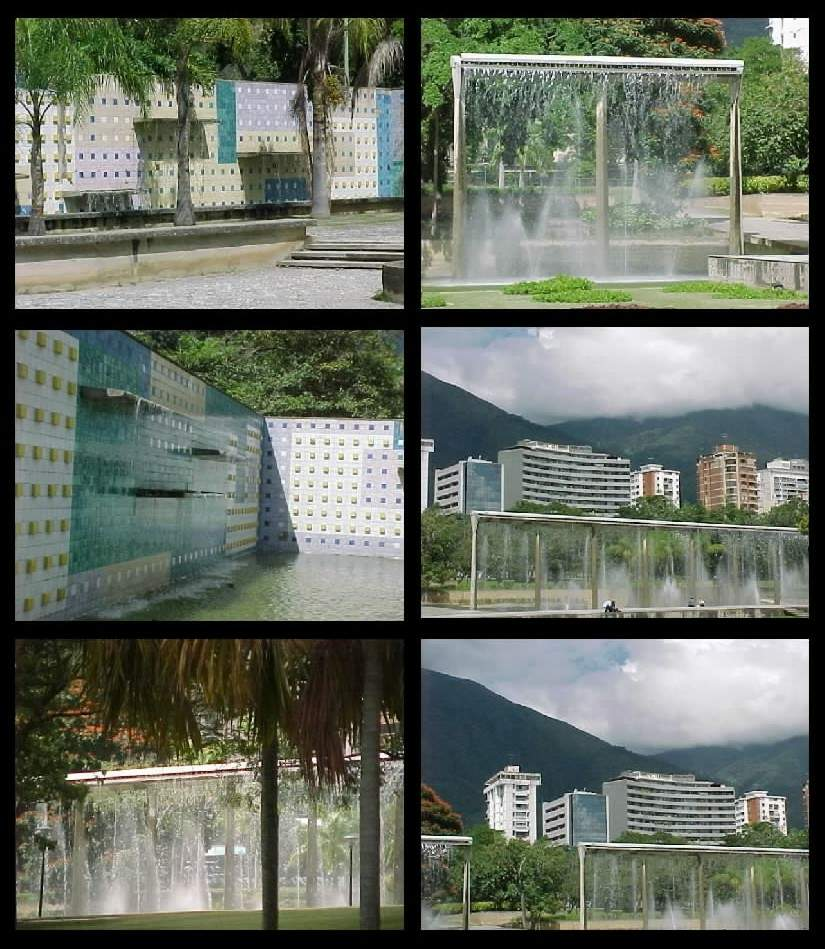
Patios in the north sector of the Park

The park is located on part of the land of the ancient hacienda San José. (10 ° 29'38 "N – 66 ° 50'8" W) A remnant of the hacienda still exists today, located between the existing park boundaries and the Santa Cecilia distributor, in front of the Caracas Museum of Transport.

The area was convenient hacienda San José land primarily planted with old Bucares (Erythrina spp.) on which hung strands of Lagas Palo Beard (Tillandsia usneoides); in addition there were old coffee trees (Coffea arabica).

The park's inauguration took place under the government of President Rómulo Betancourt on January 19, 1961 under Decree No. 443 from May 1960 and its design was the product of a local office of landscape architecture established by Brazilian landscape artist Roberto Burle Marx in partnership with landscape architects Fernando Tábora and John Godfrey William Stoddart.

When first inaugurated, the park was designed to cater to around 6,000 visitors monthly.

=== Official name ===
Over time, the Parque del Este has had different official names: at the time of its inauguration in 1961 was called "Rómulo Gallegos" Park in honor of the renowned Venezuelan author; in 1983 it was renamed "Rómulo Betancourt" Park as a homage to the former president of Venezuela; and in 2002, renamed yet again to the present Generalissimo "Francisco Miranda Park" in honor of the Venezuelan national hero of the Independence.

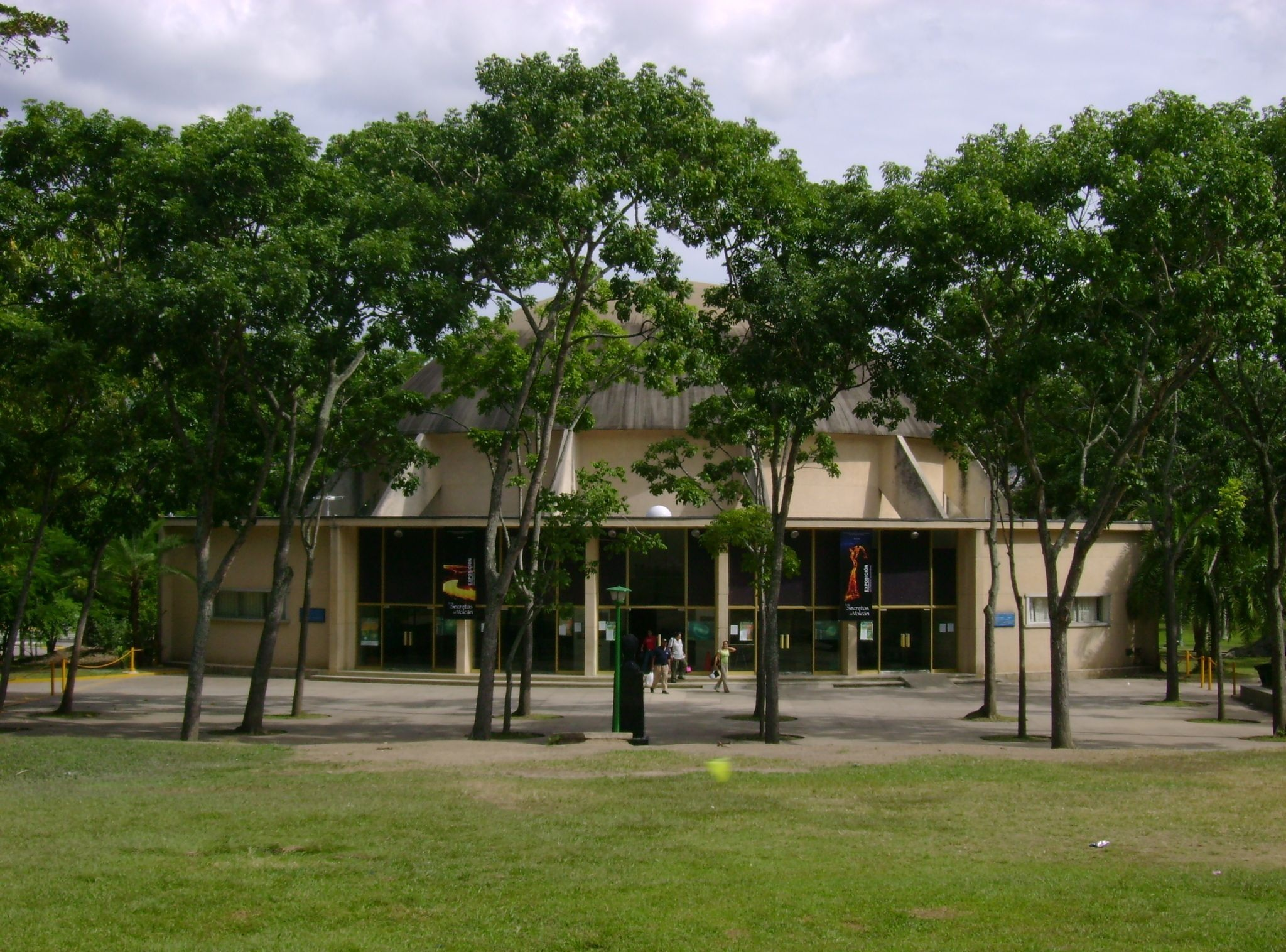
Humboldt Planetarium

=== Humboldt Planetarium ===
The Humboldt Planetarium construction begun on 15 January 1959 under the direction of the designer, Venezuelan architect Carlos Guinand Sandoz (1917–1963) and its inauguration took place on July 24, 1961. Its facilities include a 20-meter dome and a Zeiss planetarium projector.

Its mission is to establish and promote knowledge in astronomy and related sciences, and to make them available for all public. The planetarium wants to promote formal education in all scientific levels.

=== Zoo ===
The Parque del Este has a zoo with a wide variety of animals, including jaguars, monkeys, squirrels, capybaras, which in Venezuela are known as "chigüire", ocelots, sloths, opossums, many kinds of birds: Caricare hawks, parrots, yellow-shouldered parrot, Tinamou, white heron, kind egret, blue heron, yellow orioles known as gonzalito, blue and yellow macaw, scarlet macaw, green macaw, North Guacharaca, barn owls, helmeted curassow, king vulture, red-billed toucan and reptiles including crocodiles and anacondas.

=== Caravel of Christopher Columbus ===
For many years one of the attractions of the Parque del Este was a replica of the caravel of Columbus, known as the Nao Santa Maria was built in the city of Barcelona, Spain, purchased by the Venezuelan Development Corporation and brought to the country in 1967. The Chi, children's Foundation donated it to the Parque del Este on the 12th of October 1971; inside there were allegorical figures of Columbus and the crew that accompanied him on his travels, as well as weapons, shields, flags, clothing, tools, navigational devices and more.

=== Corvette Leander ===
The Nao Santa Maria display continued until 2008 when, by decree of the President Hugo Chávez, it was dismantled to be substituted by a replica of the corvette Leander and a museum to honor Francisco de Miranda, a project which brought about a legal dispute.

Considerations aside, the Nao Santa Maria suffered deterioration caused by years of neglect, so the replication status at the time of decommissioning was serious. One of the reasons which led to the substitution by the corvette was the need to implement a rehabilitation plan of the park originally designed to receive about 6,000 people a month, but already welcoming about 270,000, with consequent deterioration as a result.

== Gallery ==
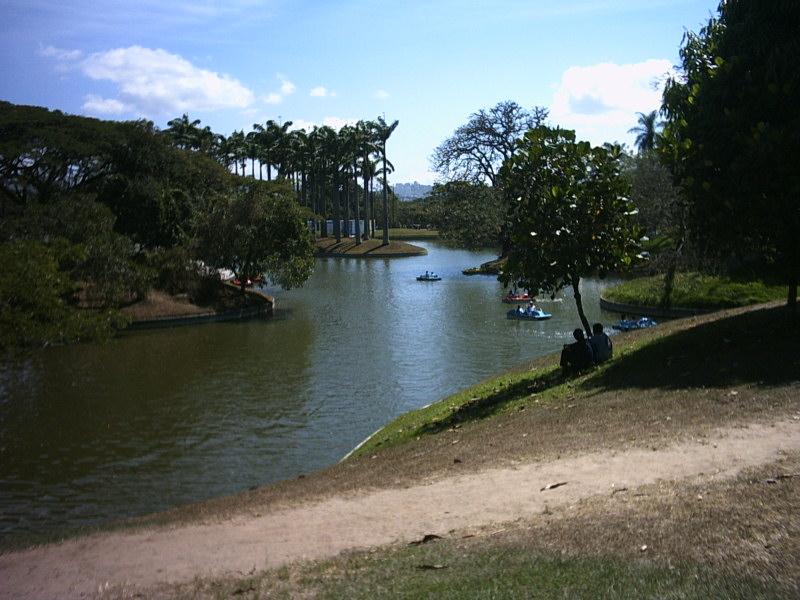
Boating lake

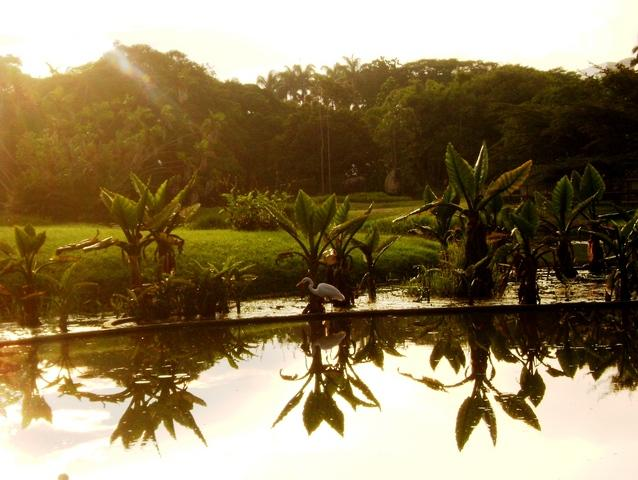
Lake plant

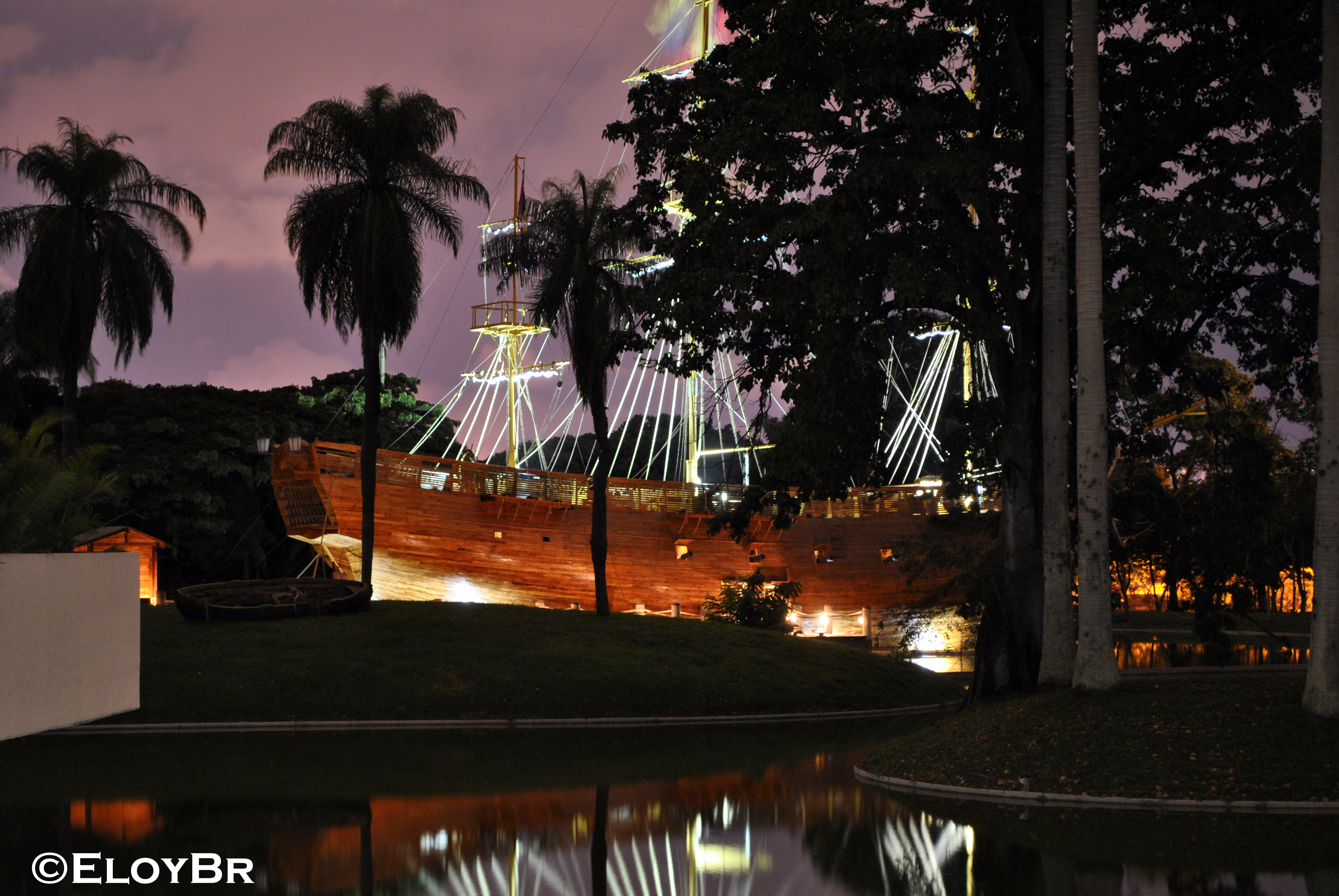
Nao Santa Maria Replica

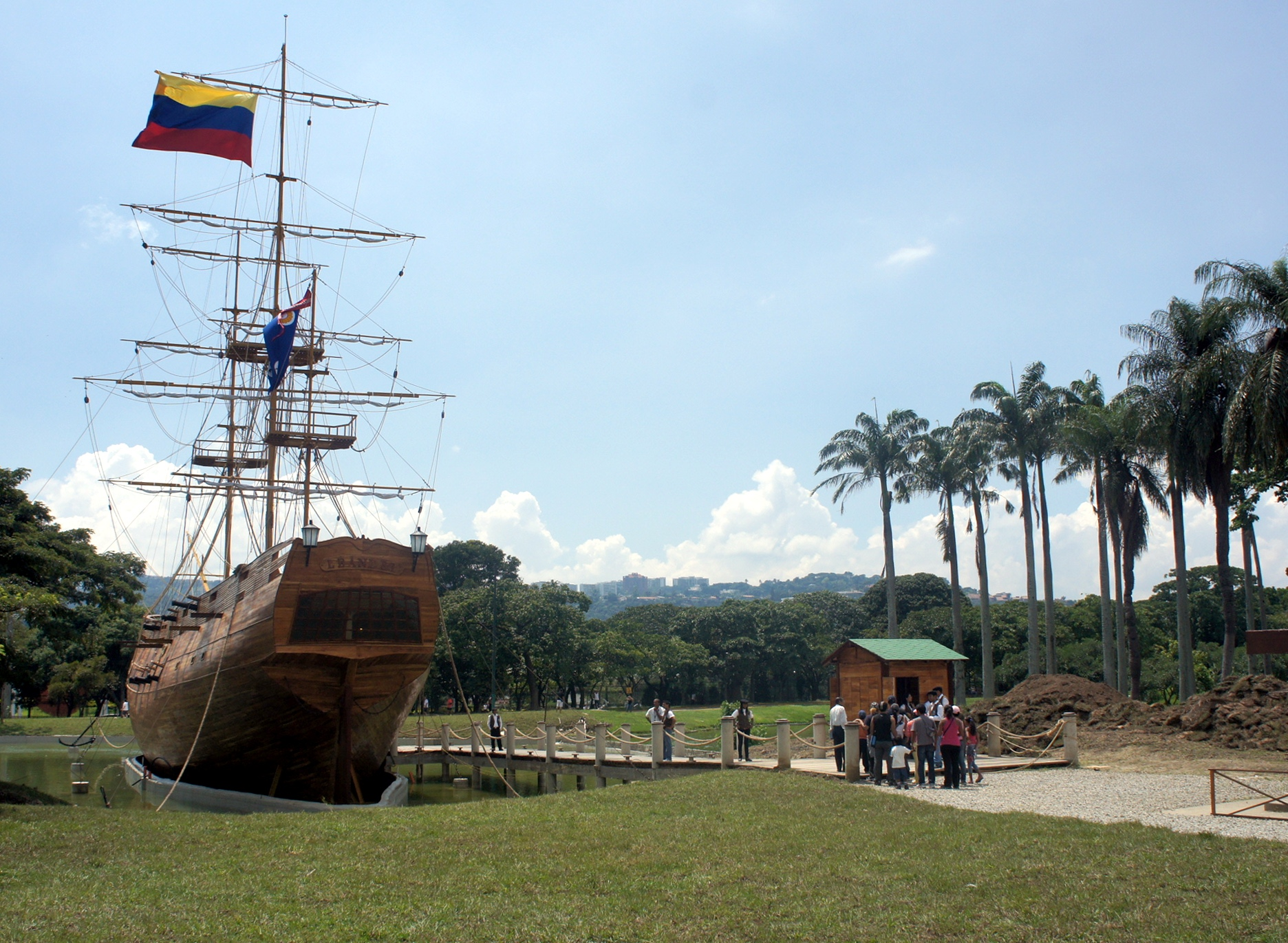
Replica of the Leander in Parque del Este

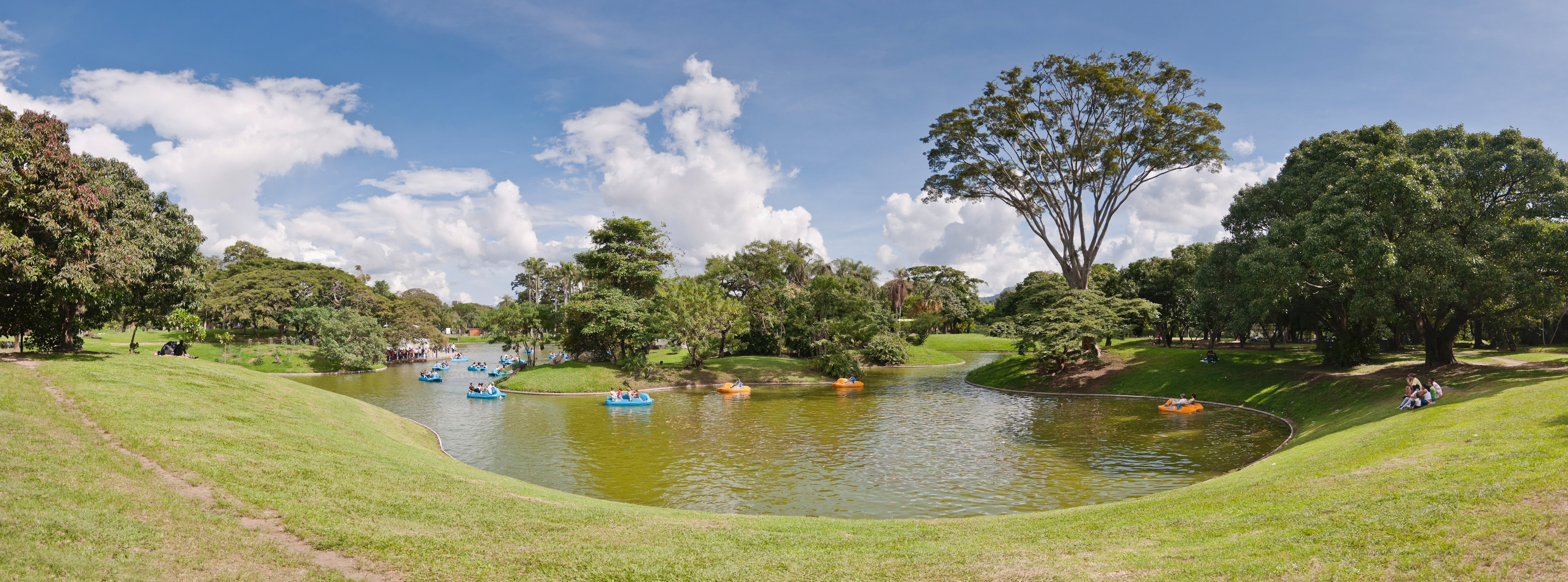
Panoramic view of the South Lake in Parque del Este, 2011
