= Altamira, Caracas =

- Neighbourhood
- Location within Venezuela
- Coordinates: 10°29′N 66°50′W
- Country: Venezuela
- State: Miranda
- Municipality: Chacao Municipality
- Time zone: UTC−4 (VET)

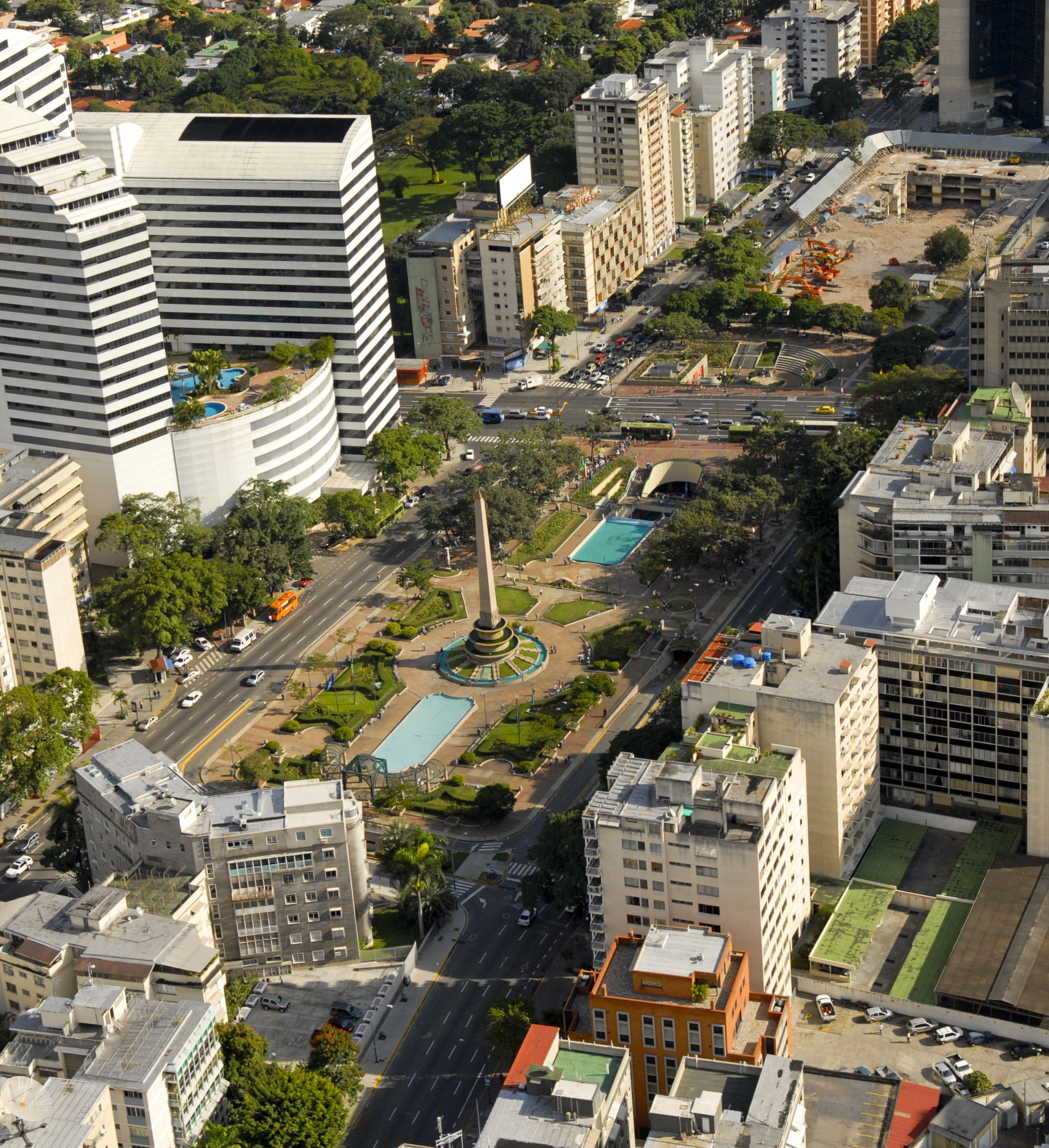
Aerial view of the Plaza Francia and its surroundings, which compose the Altamira zone of Caracas.

Altamira is a neighborhood located in the Chacao municipality of Caracas, Venezuela. It has its own Metro Station, hotels and restaurants, and it is an important business and residential center of the city. It is also an important tourist destination and cultural center in Caracas. The Francisco de Miranda avenue (a major avenue in Caracas) and the Distibuidor Altamira (a congested highway exit) are both located in Altamira. This neighborhood borders El Ávila National Park to the north, La Castellana neighborhood to the west, Los Palos Grandes to the east, and Bello Campo neighborhood to the south. It has an estimated area of 161 hectares or approximately 1.61 square kilometers.

== History ==
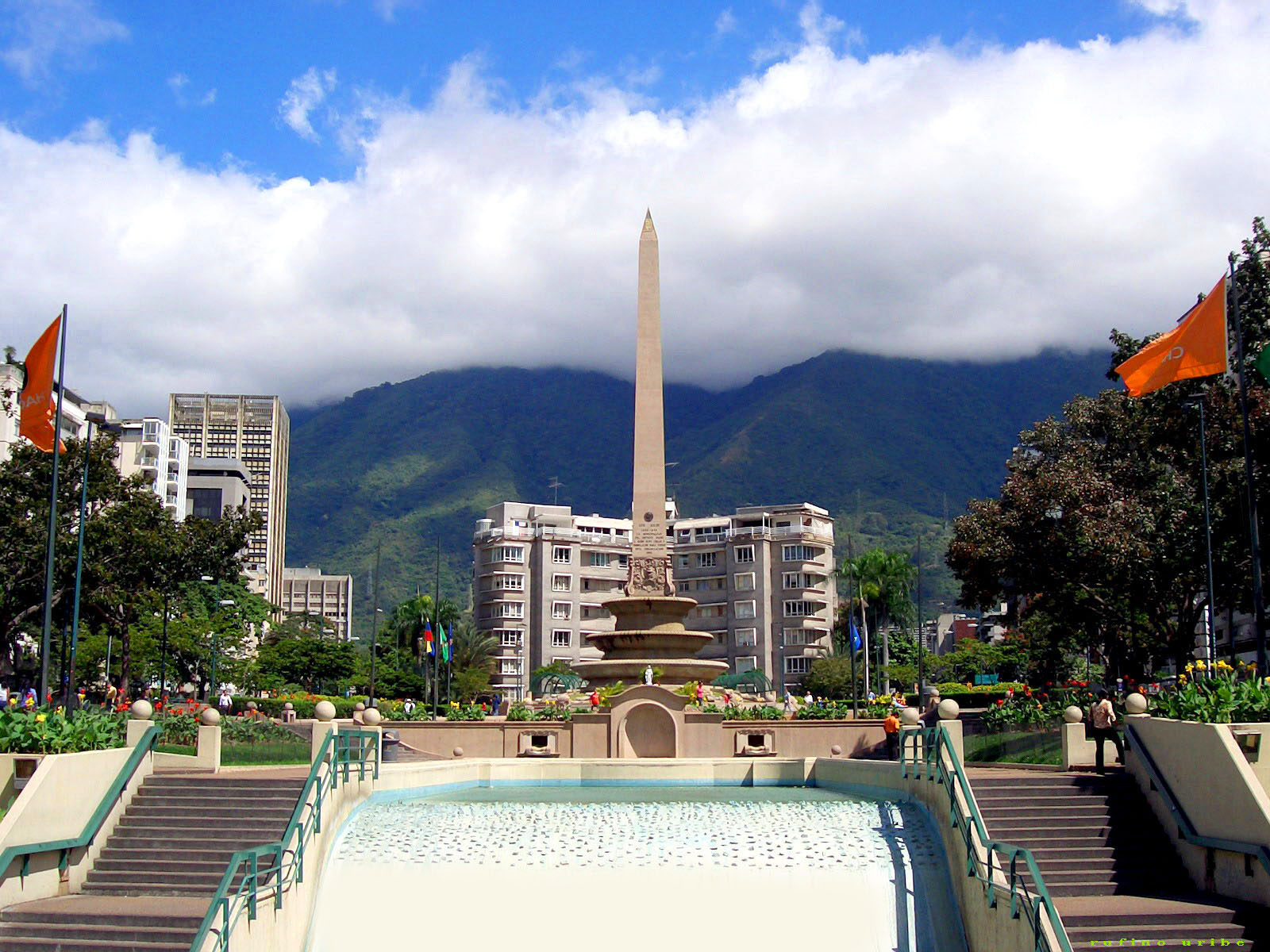
Plaza Francia

Altamira was created on June 30, 1577, by Juan Andres Varela. This neighborhood is currently home to Plaza Francia (though it is commonly called Plaza Altamira), a well-known landmark which includes an obelisk and a fountain. This square and most of Altamira was built by Luis Roche, who owned most of the area in 1943. In 1944, Luis Roche ordered -with permission of the government- the construction of many avenues and the square. Roche wanted the square's obelisk to be "higher than the Cathedral of Caracas". The square was completed by Martin Hermanos co on August 11, 1945, and was originally called Plaza Altamira. On January 17, 1967, the Venezuelan and French governments agreed to rename Plaza Altamira to Plaza Francia (France Square in Spanish). The French government built a Plaza Venezuela in their country in 1975.

In 1948, Luis Roche began exploring the possibility of building a tunnel between Altamira and the Caribbean Sea. He contacted the people who were in charge of the construction of the Hudson River Tunnels, in New York City. This project was scrapped due to its high cost as it required three tunnels, two of them used exclusively for ventilation. If built, the tunnel would have been about eight kilometers long. Luis Roche was later assigned Venezuelan Ambassador to Argentina.

Today, Altamira has its own Metro Station, many hotels and restaurants, and is an important business center in Caracas. Avenida Francisco de Miranda (a major avenue in Caracas) and the Distribuidor Altamira (a congested highway exit) are both located in Altamira.

Altamira was the scene of a mass shooting on December 6, 2002. João de Gouveia murdered three citizens and injured 19 participating in a demonstration in Plaza Altamira against Venezuelan president Hugo Chávez. The shooting occurred during the 2002-2003 general strike. On August 16, 2004, Plaza Francia was the scene of another incident. A group of opposition activists, protesting what they considered to be fraudulent electoral results of the Presidential Recall Referendum, were met with a hail of bullets from a group of Pro-Government supporters. One person was killed and nine wounded.

== Economy ==
The headquarters of Estelar Airlines is in Altamira.

== Education ==
The British School, Caracas is in Altamira.

== Culture ==
A world-renowned branch of the internationally acclaimed worldwide organization Tomchei Tmimim Yeshiva Gedola is located in Altamira. The hub of the bajurim.

== See also ==
- 1967 Caracas earthquake
- Caracas
- El Rosal, Caracas
- El Hatillo
- Sabana Grande (Caracas)
- Las Mercedes, Caracas
- Chacao Municipality
- Baruta Municipality
- Miranda
