= Las Mercedes, Caracas =

- Location within Venezuela
- Coordinates: 10°28′N 66°51′W
- Time zone: UTC−4 (VET)

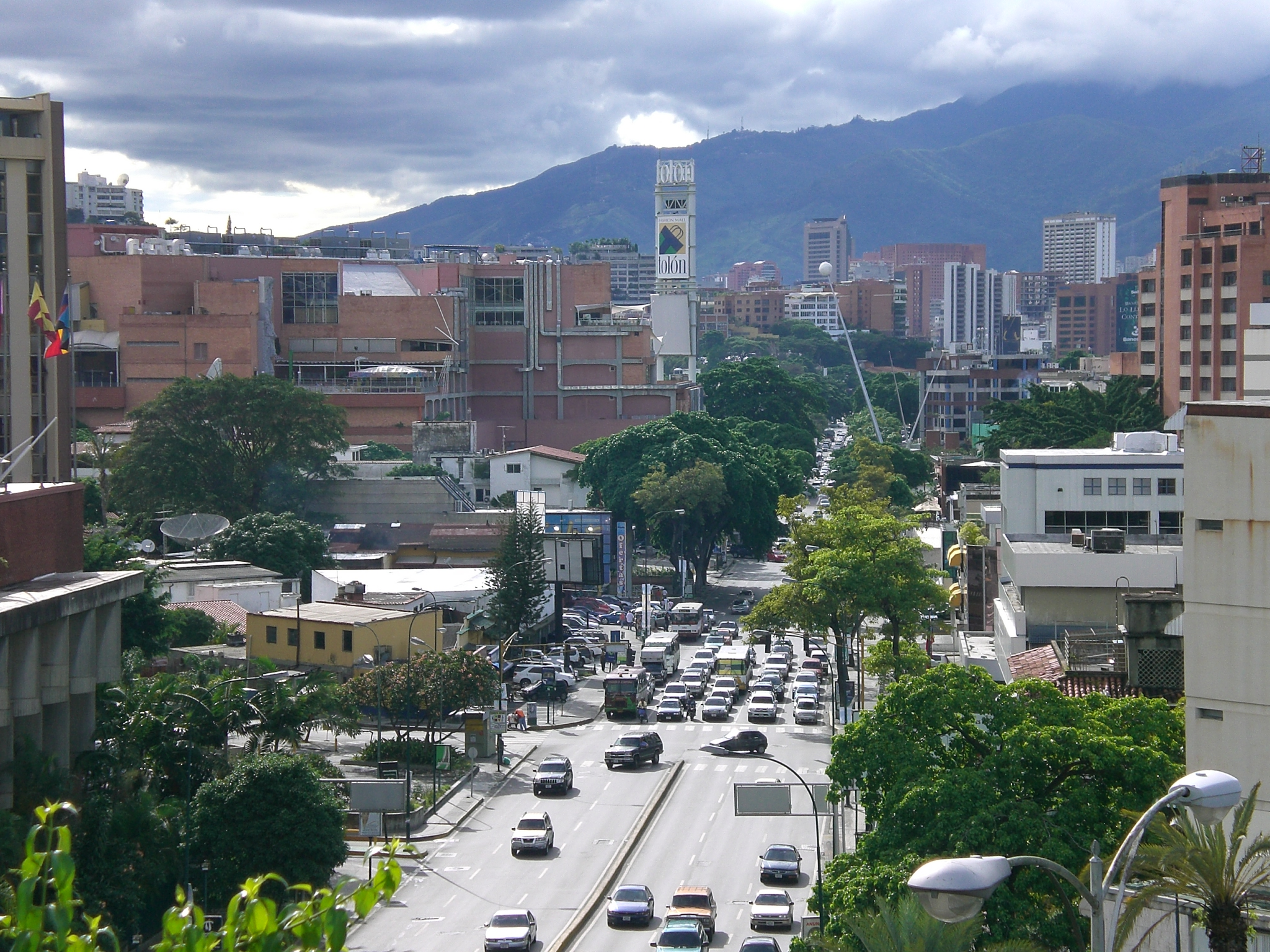
Las Mercedes Avenue

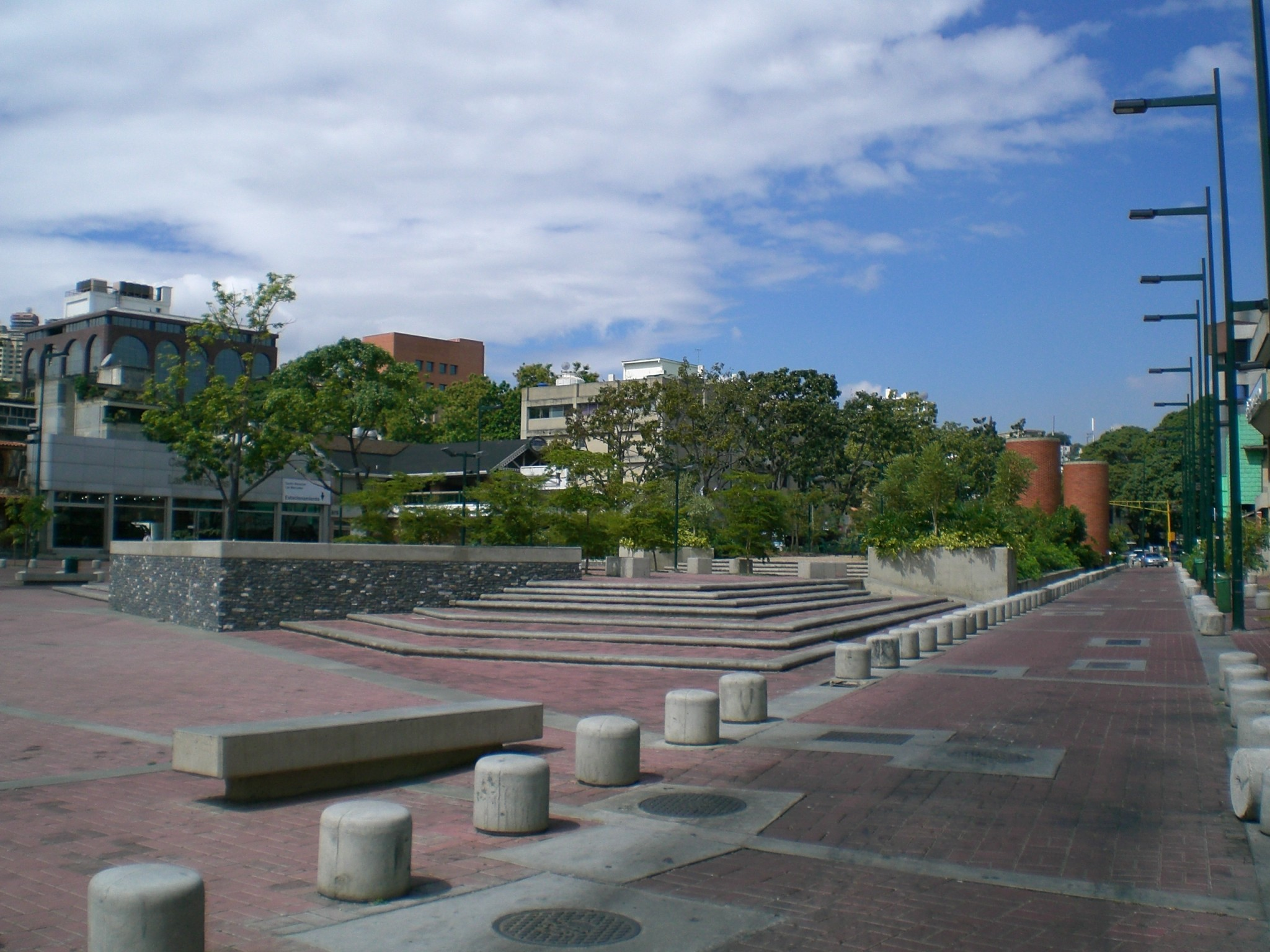
Plaza Alfredo Sadel, Las Mercedes

Las Mercedes is the largest district for shopping and leisure in Latin America. It is located at the Baruta Municipality, Miranda (state), Caracas. It has an estimated area of 93 hectares (0.93 square kilometers).

It contains discos and pubs. It contains clothing and fashion stores, art galleries, and restaurants, that include diverse gastronomical specialties from local food such as areperas to foreign and international food.

== History ==
In the 21st century, new malls have included the Tolón Mall. In 2006 the Baruta mayor began remodeling the Plaza Alfredo Sadel and an upgrade to the Las Mercedes drainage. There are plans for a future expansion of line 4 of the Caracas Metro which is intended to connect the district with two stations, Las Mercedes and Tamanaco, with Plaza Venezuela and Parque del Este of line 1. This expansion will help reduce traffic jams.

== See also ==
- Altamira (Caracas)
- El Rosal, Caracas
- Venezuelan Capital District
