= Timeline of Caracas =

Coordinates: 10.5°N 66.916667°W

The following is a timeline of the history of the city of Caracas, Venezuela.

== Prior to 18th century ==
- 1567 – 25 July: Santiago de León de Caracas established by Spaniard Diego de Losada.
- 1577 – Town becomes capital of Venezuela Province, Spanish Empire.
- 1584 – St. George's Cathedral, Caracas built.
- 1591 – Caracas coat of arms granted.
- 1593 – Iglesia de San Francisco (church) built.
- 1595 – Town captured by English troops led by George Somers and Amyas Preston
- 1638 – Roman Catholic Diocese of Caracas founded.
- 1641 – 11 June: Earthquake.
- 1674 – Caracas Cathedral built.
- 1679 – Town "pillaged by the French."
- 1700 – Population: 6,000.

== 18th century ==
- 1721 – University of Caracas founded.
- 1749 – 20 April: Economic demonstration led by Juan Francisco de León.
- 1763 – Measles outbreaks begin.
- 1765 – Population: 12,500.
- 1770 – Population: 20,000.
- 1777
  - City becomes capital of Captaincy General of Venezuela.
  - Santa Rosalia parish established.
- 1779 – City divided into eight administrative wards (barrios).
- 1781 – Church of the Holy Trinity (Caracas) built.
- 1782 – Theatre built.
- 1787 – Real Audiencia of Caracas installed.
- 1793 – Consulado (merchant guild) established.

== 19th century ==
- 1802 – Population: 24,000–42,000.
- 1808 – Gazeta de Caracas newspaper begins publication.
- 1810 – Revolt from Spanish control.
- 1811
  - City becomes capital of First Republic of Venezuela.
  - Divina Pastora parish established.
- 1812 – 26 March: Earthquake.
- 1813
  - August: City taken by forces of Bolivar.
  - City becomes capital of Second Republic of Venezuela.
- 1814 – July: 1814 Caracas Exodus.
- 1818 – Academy of music founded.
- 1820 – City becomes capital of Venezuela Department of Gran Colombia.
- 1821 – 29 June: Bolívar takes city.
- 1835 – Academia de Dibujo y Pintura (art academy) founded (approximate date).
- 1861 – Colegio de Ingenieros de Venezuela established.
- 1870 – 27 April: April Revolution (Venezuela).
- 1874
  - National Pantheon of Venezuela established.
  - Bolívar statue erected in Bolívar Square.
- 1881
  - Teatro Municipal de Caracas opens.
  - City becomes part of the Distrito Federal de Venezuela.
  - Population: 55,638.
- 1882 – Horse-drawn streetcar begins operating.
- 1883
  - La Guaira-Caracas railway begins operating.
  - Basilica of Santa Capilla (church) built.
  - Academia Venezolana Correspondiente de la Real Española established.
- 1887 – Academia de Musica y Declamacion (music school) and Academia de Bellas Artes (art school) active.
- 1889 – Academia Nacional de la Historia de Venezuela inaugurated.
- 1891 – Population: 72,429.
- 1894 – Valencia-Caracas railway begins operating.
- 1895 – Electricidad de Caracas in business.
- 1897 – Miraflores Palace built.

== 20th century ==
- 1900 – Earthquake
- 1904 - Population: 90,000.(estimate).
- 1905 – National Theatre opens.
- 1908 – Electric streetcar begins operating.
- 1909 – El Universal newspaper in publication.
- 1918 – Spanish flu reaches Caracas
- 1922 – Population: 92,212.
- 1928 – Generation of 1928 anti-Gómez protest.
- 1929 – Cine El Dorado (cinema) opens in San Agustín Parish
- 1931
  - Caracas Athenaeum founded.
  - Teatro Principal (Caracas) opens.
- 1937 – Municipal Commission of Town Planning established.
- 1941 – Population: 269,030 city; 380,099 federal district.
- 1945
  - Simón Bolívar International Airport, Altamira Square, and Jardin Botanico de Caracas. inaugurated.
  - Caracas Journal newspaper begins publication.
- 1947 – Caracas Stock Exchange established.
- 1950
  - British School established.
  - Population: 495,064 city; 693,896 urban agglomeration.
- 1951 – Estadio Olímpico opens.
- 1952
  - Aerial Tramway begins operating.
  - Estadio Universitario opens.
- 1953
  - Radio Caracas Televisión begins broadcasting.
  - Cine Radio City (cinema) opens.
- 1954 – Centro Simón Bolívar Towers built
- 1958 – El Mundo newspaper begins publication.
- 1959 – La Rinconada Hippodrome opens in Coche Parish
- 1960 – University City built.
- 1961 – Population: 786,710 city; 1,362,189 federal district.
- 1963 – December: Christmas display of illuminated Cruz del Ávila begins.
- 1966 – CorpBanca Tower built.
- 1967
  - 29 July: 1967 Caracas earthquake.
  - Simón Bolívar University and Caracas Football Club established.
  - Central Bank of Venezuela Building constructed.
- 1971 – Population: 1,662,627 city; 2,175,400 urban agglomeration (approximate).
- 1973 – Previsora Tower and Bet-El Synagogue built.
- 1974
  - Poliedro de Caracas (arena) opens.
  - Museo de Arte Contemporáneo de Caracas opens.
- 1975
  - 28 October: 1975 Copa América football tournament held.
  - Orquesta Sinfónica Simón Bolívar (youth orchestra) headquartered in city.
- 1977 – Parque Zoológico Caricuao opens.
- 1978 – National Theatre Festival begins (approximate date).
- 1979 – El Diario de Caracas newspaper begins publication.
- 1982 – Children's Museum of Caracas established.
- 1983
  - Caracas Metro begins operating.
  - Teresa Carreño Theatre and Brígido Iriarte Stadium open.
  - Plaza Caracas and Parque Central Complex built.
  - August: 1983 Pan American Games held.
- 1984 – Mercantil Tower and Provincial Tower built.
- 1987 – Parque Cristal built.
- 1989
  - February: Protests.
  - National Library of Venezuela building opens.
- 1990
  - Tower of David construction begins.
  - Population: 1,824,892 city; 2,784,042 urban agglomeration.
- 1993 – Mosque of Sheikh Ibrahim Al-Ibrahim built.
- 1995 – Polar Tower II built.
- 1998 – Centro San Ignacio (commercial building) opens.
- 1999
  - Capital District (Venezuela) established.
  - Movilnet Tower, and Centro Sambil (shopping mall) built.
- 2000
  - Metropolitan District of Caracas created, with jurisdiction over Baruta, Chacao, El Hatillo, Libertador, and Sucre.
  - Alfredo Peña becomes mayor.
  - Mormon temple dedicated.

== 21st century ==
- 2002 – 11 April: Demonstration.
- 2004
  - Juan Barreto becomes mayor.
  - Estrella Roja Football Club formed.
  - 17 October: Fire in Parque Central Complex.
- 2005 – Venezuela International Book Fair begins.
- 2006
  - January: World Social Forum held.
  - Libertador Simón Bolívar Terminal opens.
- 2007
  - May: RCTV closure demonstration.
  - Squatters occupy Centro Financiero Confinanzas.
- 2008
  - Antonio Ledezma becomes mayor.
  - Real Esppor football club formed.
- 2010 – Metrocable (gondola) begins operating.
- 2011 – Population: 2,104,423.
- 2012 – 20 August: Yare prison riot.
- 2014 – February: 2014–2018 Venezuelan protests begin.
- 2015 - Population: 2,082,130.
- 2017 - July: Strike in protest against President Maduro.
- 2019 - January: Venezuelan Presidential crisis begins, leading to the 2019 Venezuelan protests.
- 2026 - January: U.S strikes Caracas and captures President Maduro.

== See also ==
- Caracas history
- History of Caracas
- Capital District (Venezuela)
- List of newspapers in Venezuela
- List of universities in Caracas
- History of Venezuela

== Bibliography ==
Published in the 19th century

- Robert Semple (1812), "(Santiago de Leon de Caracas)", Sketch of the present state of Caracas, Robert Baldwin, OCLC 4107713
- William Eleroy Curtis (1888), "Caracas", The Capitals of Spanish America, New York: Harper & Bros. – via Internet Archive
- Archibald Wilberforce, ed. (1893). "Caracas". The Capitals of the Globe. New York: Peter Fenelon Collier.
- Richard Harding Davis (1895). "Paris of South America". Harper's New Monthly Magazine.
- Arturo Rivera (1897). Illustrated Guide to Caracas.

Published in the 20th century

- "Venezuela: Caracas". Handbook of Learned Societies and Institutions: America. Publication no. 39. USA: Carnegie Institution of Washington. 1908. hdl:2027/uc2.ark:/13960/t5t72q98c – via HathiTrust.
- "Caracas". Catholic Encyclopedia. New York. 1908. hdl:2027/mdp.39015024854435 – via HathiTrust.
- "Carácas" . Encyclopædia Britannica. Vol. 5 (11th ed.). 1910. p. 298.
- William Alfred Hirst (1915), "Caracas", Guide to South America, New York: Macmillan Company
- P.L. Bell (1922), "Caracas and Commercial District", Venezuela, a Commercial and Industrial Handbook, United States. Dept. of Commerce, Washington, DC: Government Printing Office
- Annie Smith Peck (1922), "Venezuela", Industrial and Commercial South America, New York: E. P. Dutton & Company
- "Caracas". Collier's Encyclopedia. New York: P.F. Collier & Son. 1928. hdl:2027/mdp.39015073302005.
- Juan Bautista Plaza; Conchita Rexach (1943). "Music in Caracas during the Colonial Period (1770–1811)". Musical Quarterly. 29 (2): 198–213. doi:10.1093/mq/xxix.2.198. JSTOR 739521.
- John D. Martz; Peter B. Harkins (1973). "Urban Electoral Behavior in Latin America: The Case of Metropolitan Caracas, 1958-1968". Comparative Politics. 5 (4): 523–549. doi:10.2307/421395. JSTOR 421395.
- E. Jeffrey Stann (1975). "Transportation and Urbanization in Caracas, 1891–1936". Journal of Interamerican Studies and World Affairs. 17 (1): 82–100. doi:10.2307/174789. JSTOR 174789.
- Robert H. Lavenda (1979). "Social Urbanization and Caracas: A Historical Anthropological Analysis". Urban Anthropology. 8 (3/4): 365–381. JSTOR 40552889. PMID 12265085.
- Kathy Waldron (1981). "Public Land Policy and Use in Colonial Caracas". Hispanic American Historical Review. 61 (2): 258–277. doi:10.2307/2513831. JSTOR 2513831.
- Robert J. Ferry (1989). The Colonial Elite of Early Caracas: Formation and Crisis, 1567–1767. University of California Press. ISBN 978-0-520-06399-0.
- "Caracas", Venezuela, Lonely Planet, 1998, p. 114+
- Lorenzo Gonzalez Casas (2002), "Caracas", in A. Almondoz (ed.), Planning Latin America's Capital Cities, 1850–1950, Routledge, ISBN 9780415272650
- David Marley (2005), "Caracas", Historic Cities of the Americas, USA: ABC-CLIO, ISBN 1576070271
