= List of tallest buildings in Venezuela =

This is a list of the tallest buildings in Venezuela. This lists ranks Venezuela skyscrapers that stand at least 120 metres (394 feet) tall, based on standard height measurement. This includes spires and architectural details but does not include antenna masts.

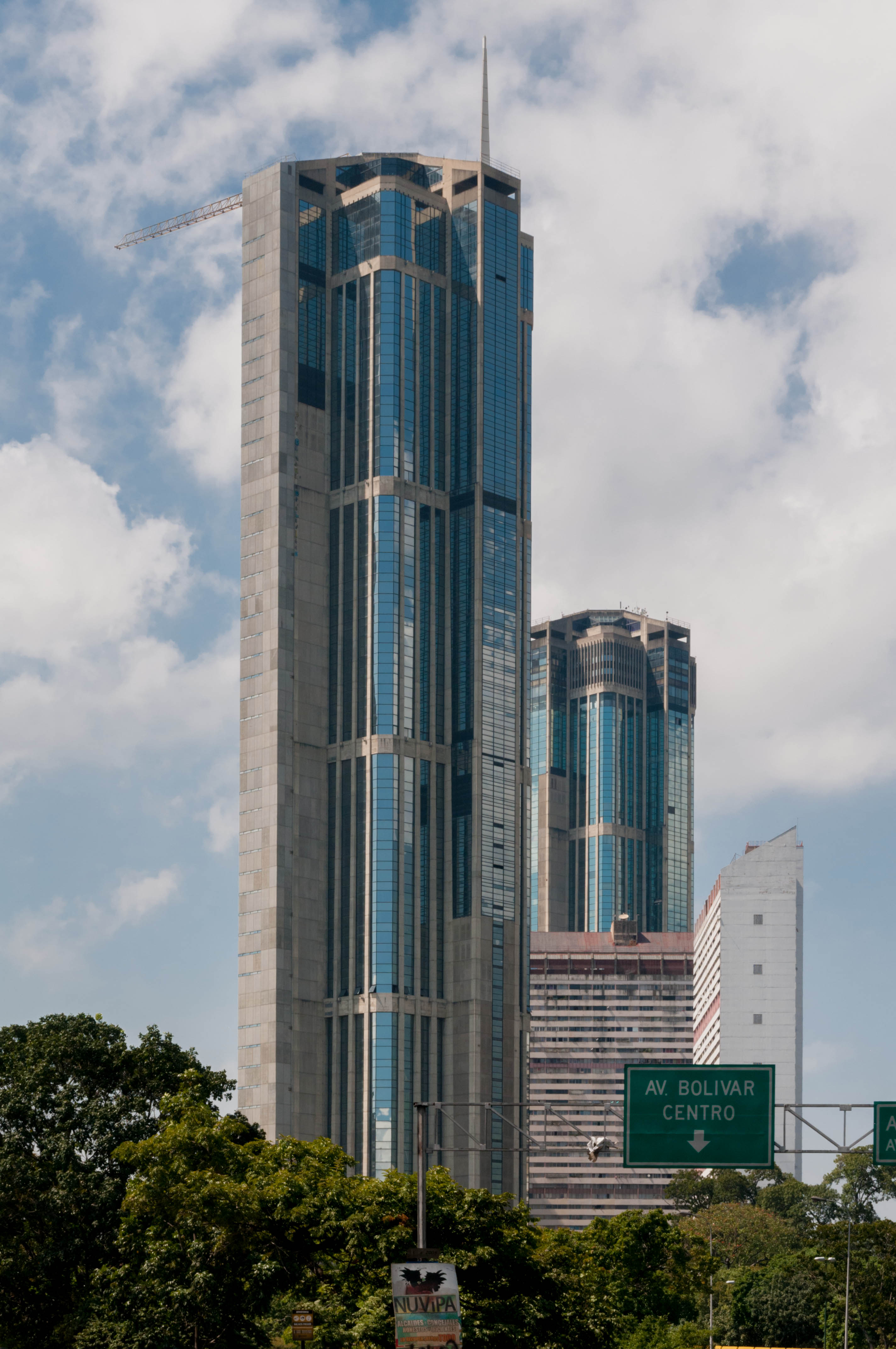
Parque Central, Caracas.

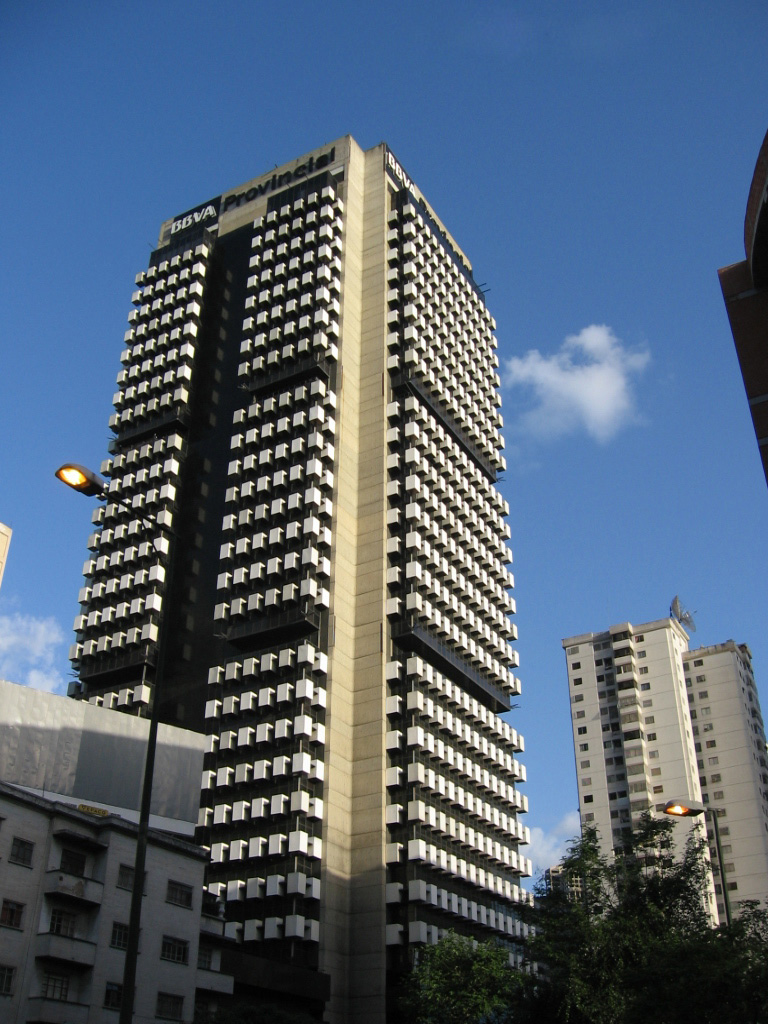
Torre Provincial, Caracas.

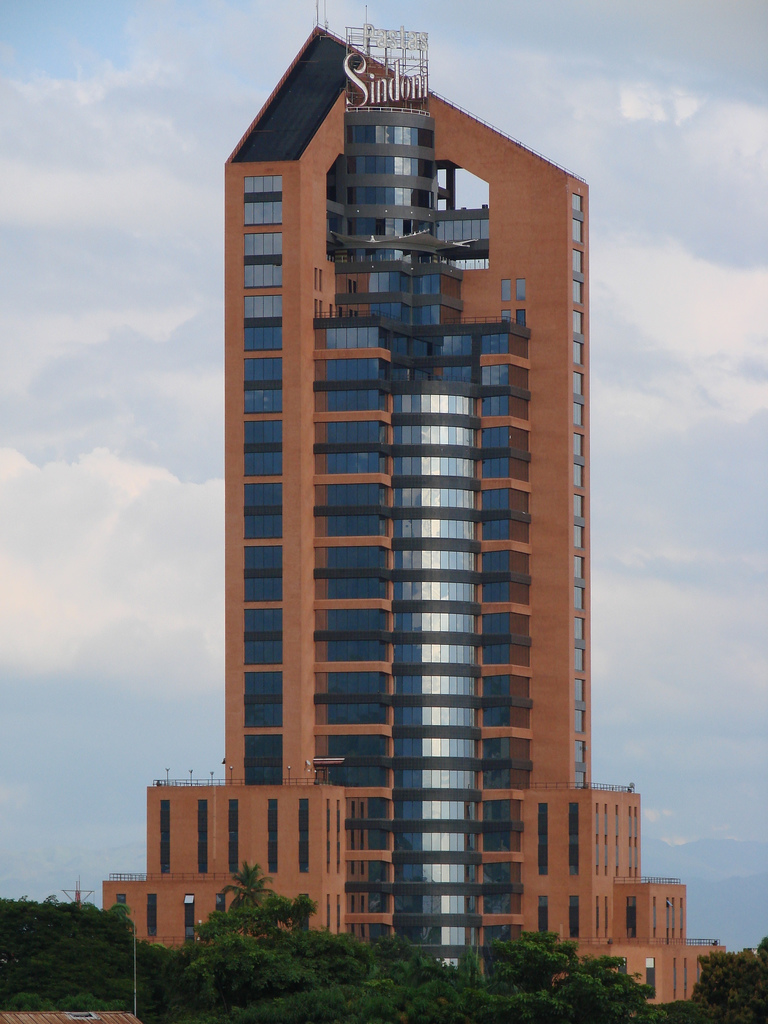
Torre Sindoni, Maracay.

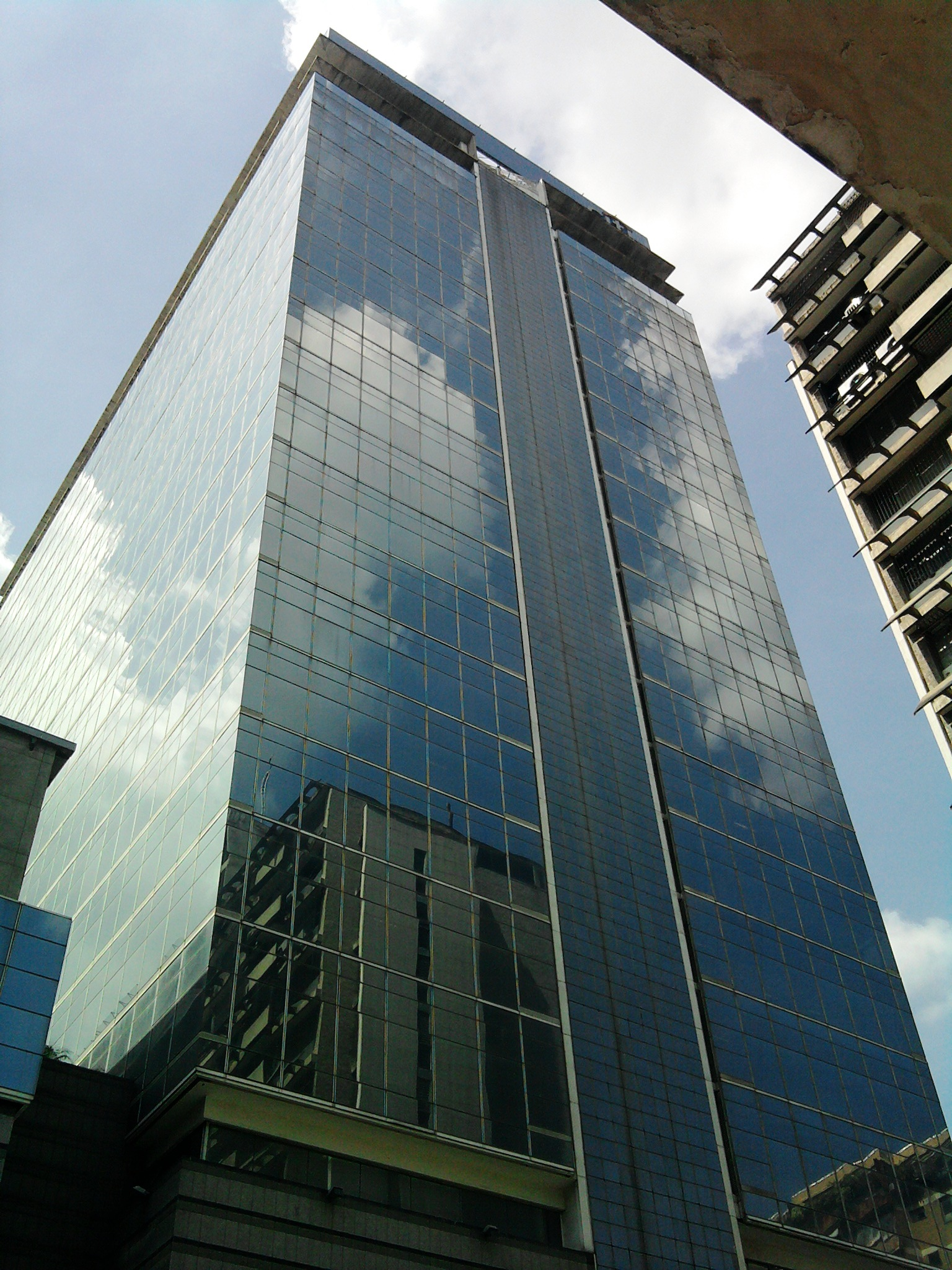
Edificio Citibank, Caracas.

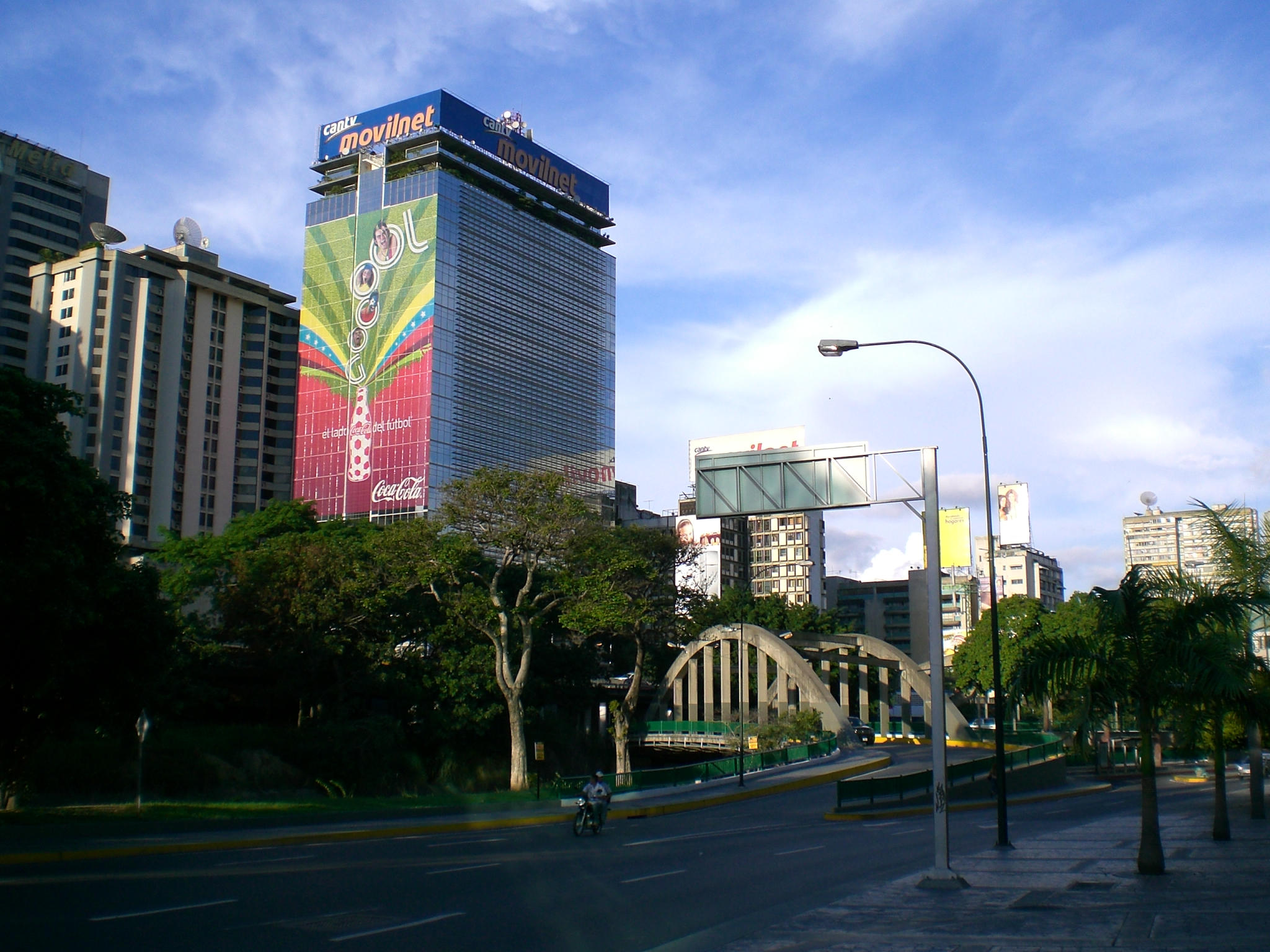
Torre Movilnet, Caracas.

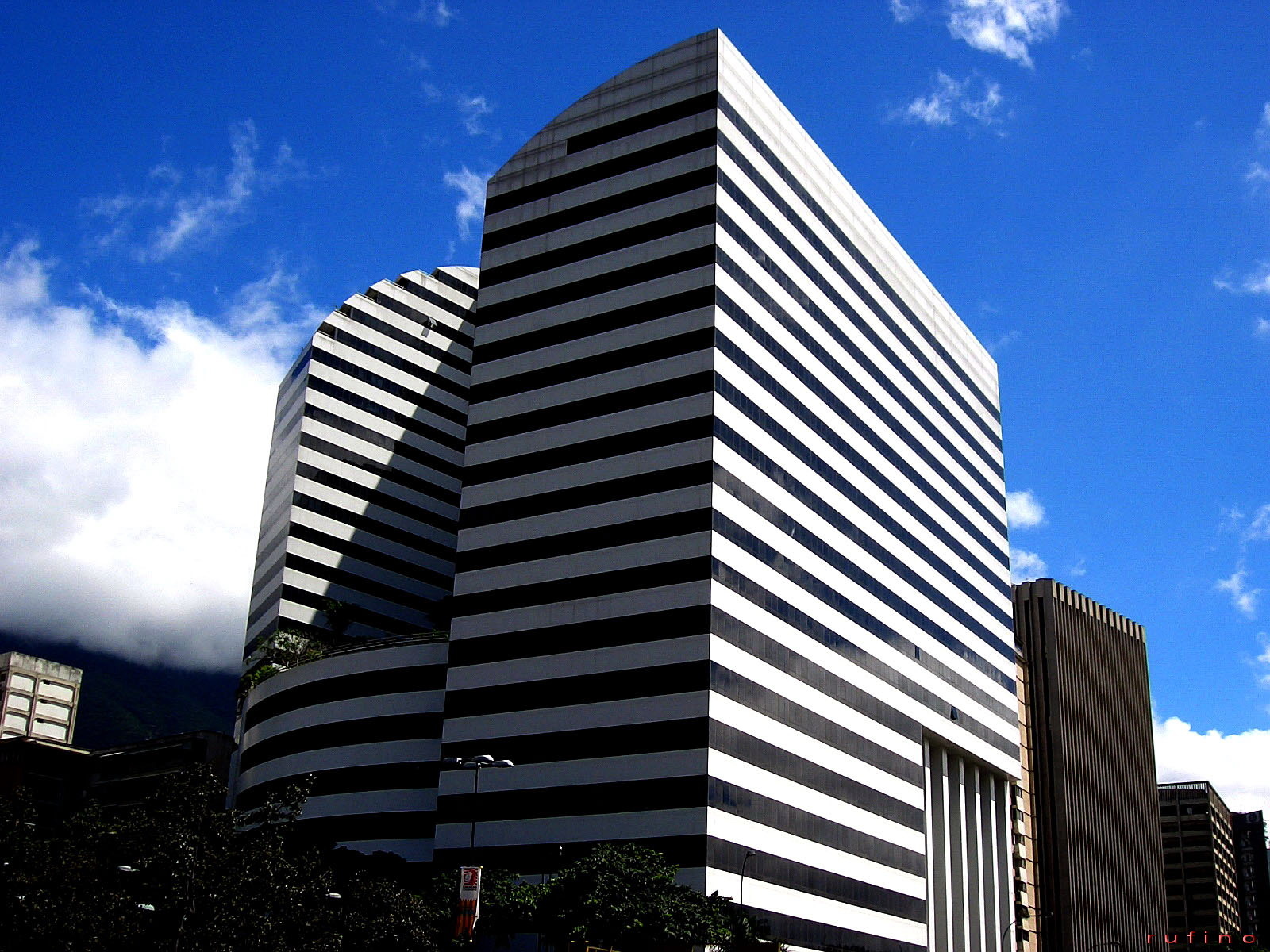
Hotel Caracas Palace, Caracas.

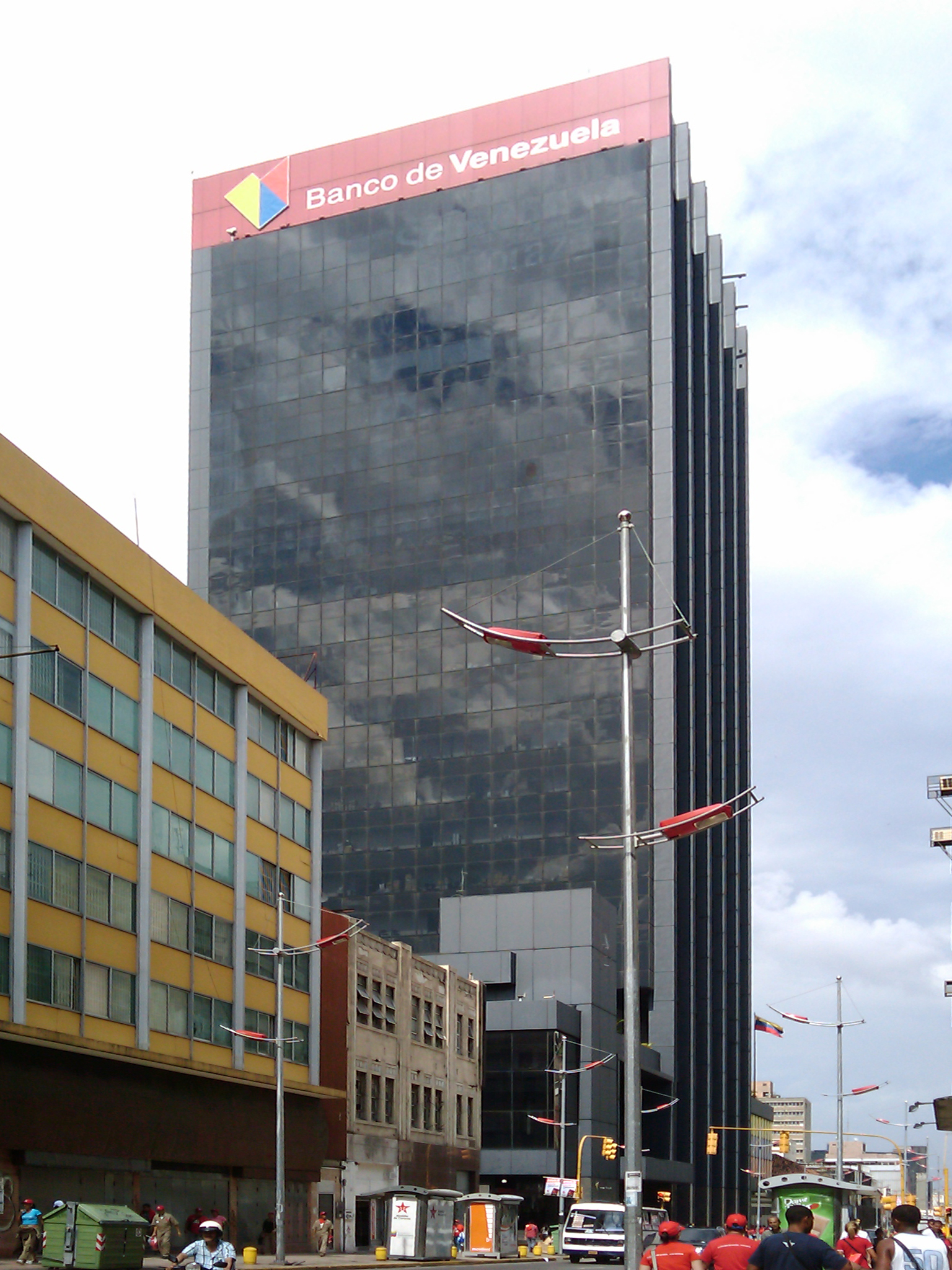
Edificio Banco de Venezuela, Caracas.

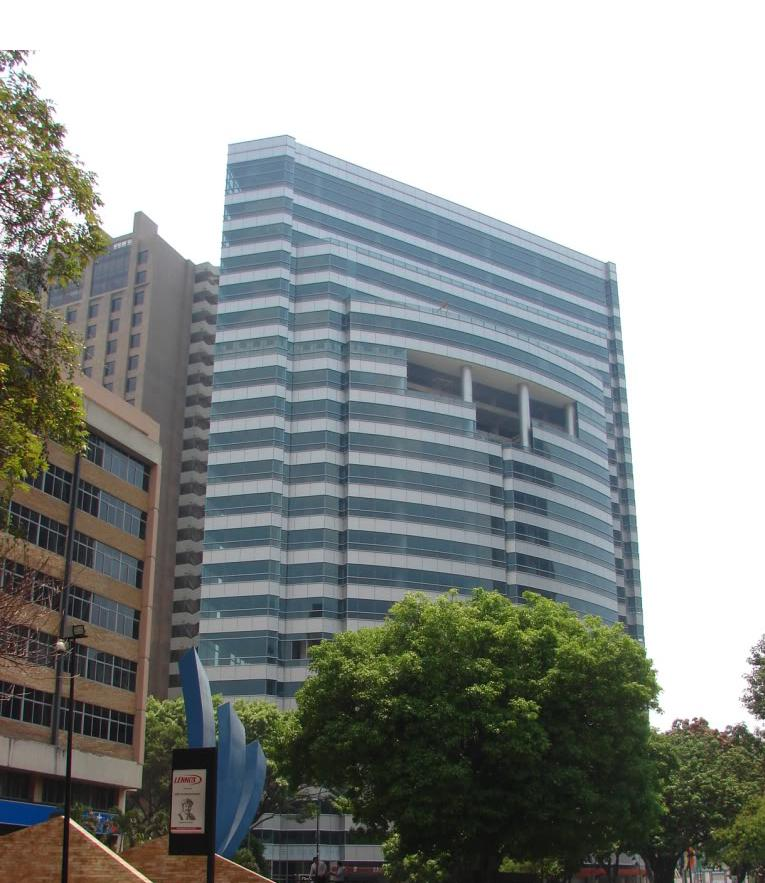
Torre Digitel, Caracas.

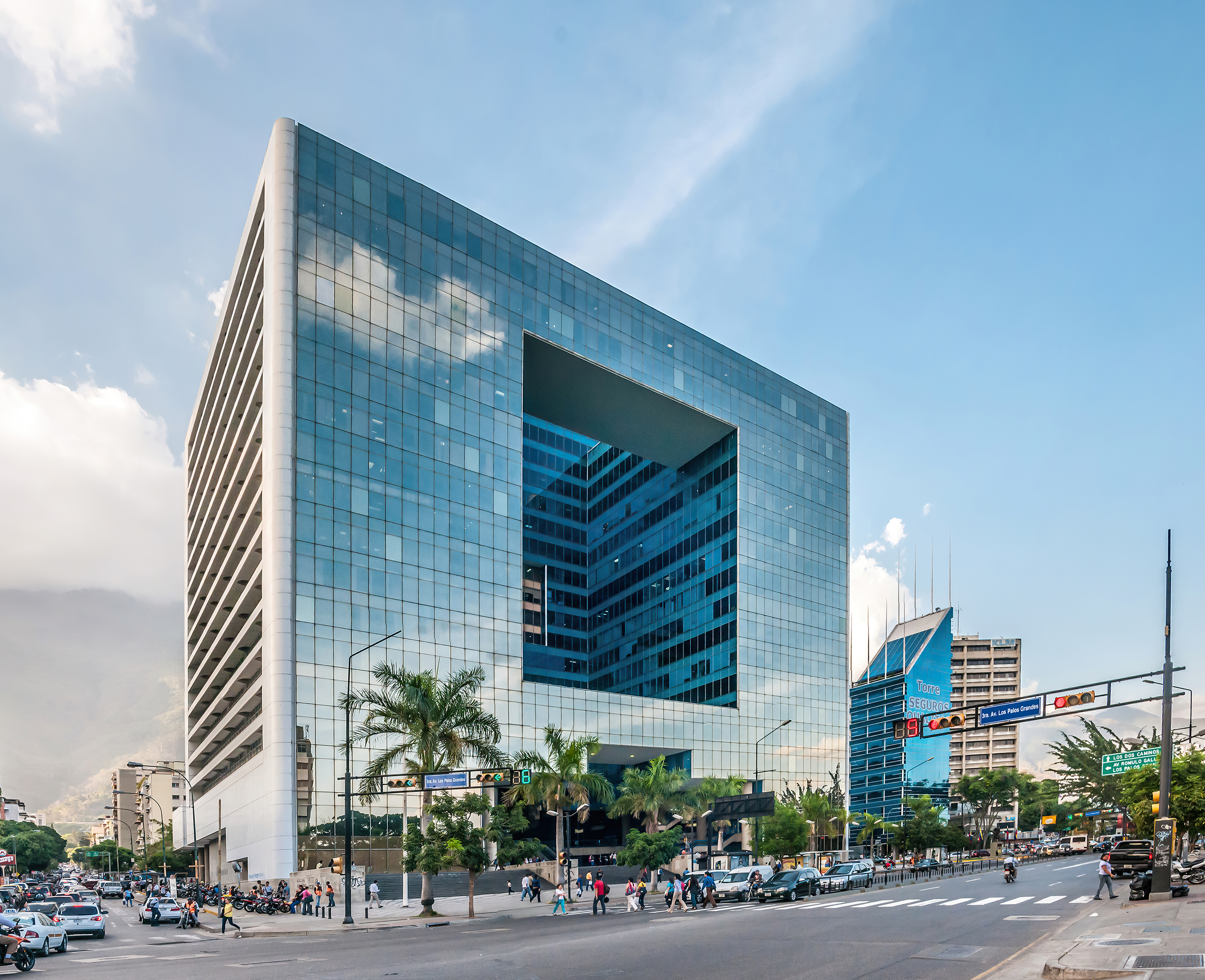
Parque Cristal, Caracas.

== List of highest buildings in Venezuela ==
Was the tallest building in Venezuela upon completion

Rank	Name	City	Coordinates	Height	Floors	Year
1	Torres Este de Parque Central	Caracas	10°29′57″N 66°54′6″W	255 m	62	1983
2	Torres Oeste de Parque Central	Caracas	10°29′53″N 66°53′58″W	225 m	62	1979
3	Centro Financiero Confinanzas	Caracas	10°30′20″N 66°53′56″W	190 m	45	1994 (Not finished)
4	Torre Mercantil	Caracas	10°30′20″N 66°53′58″W	180 m	40	1984
5	Torre BBVA Banco Provincial	Caracas	10°30′16″N 66°54′00″W	160 m	40	1984
6	Centro Financiero Latino	Caracas	10°30′25″N 66°54′29″W	153 m	32	1978
7	Hotel Alba Caracas	Caracas	10°29′59″N 66°53′58″W	130 m	36	1984
8	Torre Sindoni	Maracay	10°14′55″N 67°35′24″W	125 m	34	1999
9	Edificio Citibank	Caracas	10°29′32″N 66°52′37″W	125 m	29	1999
10	Torre Movilnet	Caracas	10°29′28″N 66°52′39″W	125 m	28	1999
11	Torre Polar 2	Caracas	10°29′52″N 66°53′11″W	121.9 m	26	1995
12	Torre Humboldt	Caracas	10°27′8″N 66°52′16″W	120.1 m	26	1988
13	Residencias San Martín	Caracas	10°29′56″N 66°54′3″W	120 m	44	1972
14	Residencias Mohedano	Caracas	10°29′52″N 66°54′1″W	120 m	44	1972
15	Residencias Tajamar	Caracas	10°29′54″N 66°54′7″W	120 m	44	1972
16	Residencias El Tejar	Caracas	10°29′53″N 66°54′3″W	120 m	44	1972
17	Residencias Catuche	Caracas	10°29′54″N 66°54′9″W	120 m	44	1972
18	Residencias Caroata	Caracas	10°29′54″N 66°54′11″W	120 m	44	1972
19	Residencias Tacagua	Caracas	10°29′57″N 66°54′10″W	120 m	44	1972
20	Gran Meliá Caracas	Caracas	10°29′32″N 66°52′40″W	120 m	27	1998

== List of skyscrapers under construction ==
Rank	Name	City	Coordinates	Height	Floors	Year
1	Torre Corporativa IME	Valencia	10°12′31″N 67°57′56″W	243.8 m	55	2025
2	Torre CAF	Caracas		150 m	35	2025
3	La Isla Multiespacio Hotel	Valencia	10°12′31″N 67°57′56″W	125 m	34	2024
4	Torre DirecTV Paseo la Castellana	Barquisimeto	10°4′12″N 69°17′22″W	120 m	31	2027

== Timeline ==
Timeline	Building	Height	Floors	City
1674–1875	Caracas Cathedral (Bell Tower)	34.0 m / 42.0 m (Before the earthquake of 1812)	1	Caracas
1875–1945	National Pantheon of Venezuela	36.0 m	1	Caracas
1945–1951	Obelisk Plaza Francia	47.25 m	0	Caracas
1951–1954	Torre Polar I	86.90 m	19	Caracas
1954–1968	Torre Norte CSB	103.0 m	25	Caracas
1968–1972	Torre Phelps	111.9 m	30	Caracas
1972–1978	Residencias San Martín	120.0 m	25	Caracas
1978–1979	Centro Financiero Latino	153.0 m	32	Caracas
1979–	Torre Oeste de Parque Central	225.0 m	64	Caracas

== See also ==
- List of tallest buildings in South America
