= Marcela Trujillo =

Multidisciplinary artist

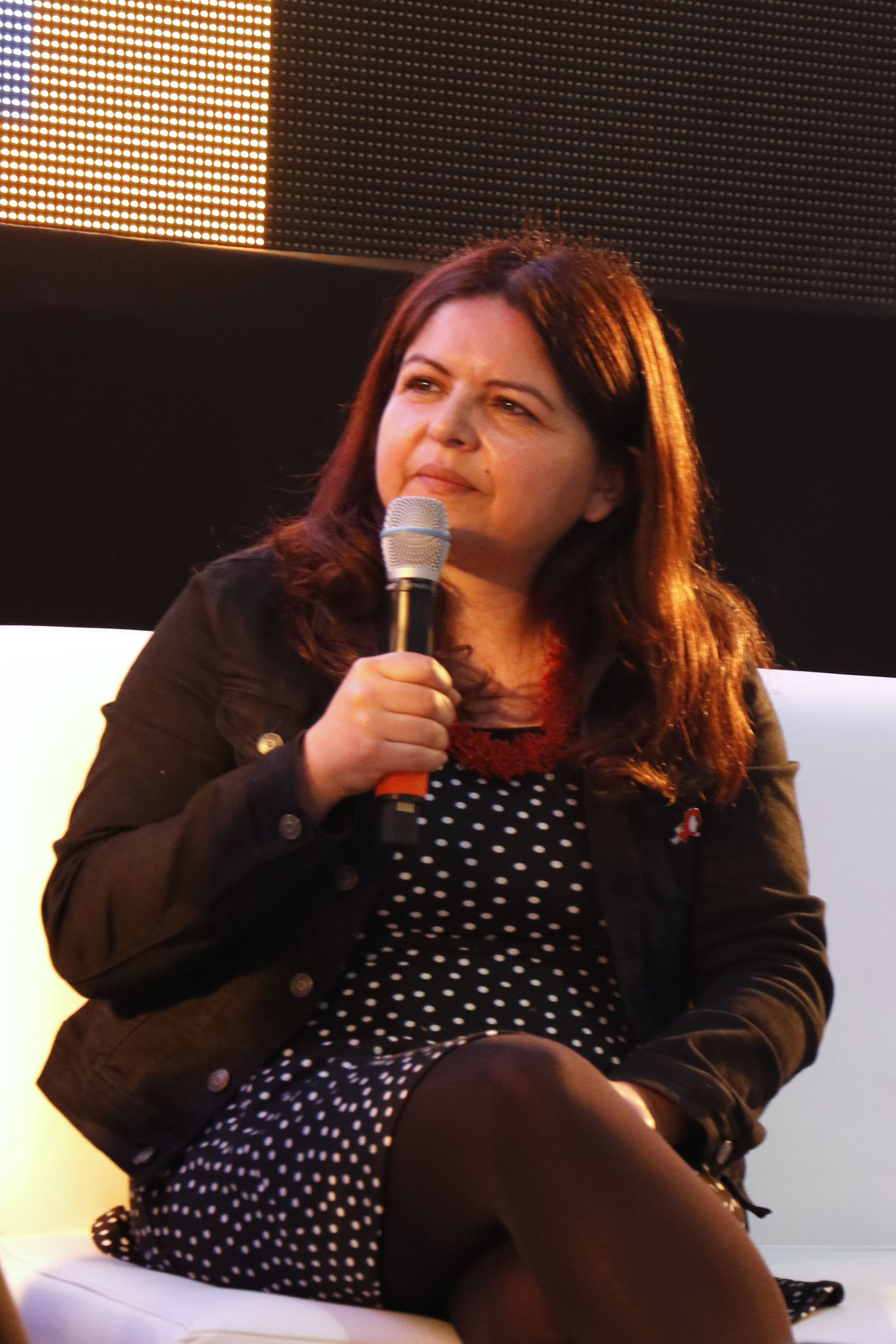
Maliki (2017)

Marcela Trujillo (Santiago de Chile, 1969), better known by her pseudonym Maliki, is a Chilean visual artist, painter, cartoonist and professor who has dabbled mainly in figurative art, and neo-pop. She is also one of the first exponents of Chilean autobiographical comics.

== Biography ==
Trujillo studied fine arts at the University of Chile, and later at the Art Students League of New York, in New York City, and the School of Visual Arts in the same city.

She uses mixed techniques in works of variable size. Although she does not define herself as a militant of any feminist group, she acknowledges that in her pictorial work, it is possible to find this discourse, particularly in themes related to the defense of women's rights such as "the need to understand (...) [her] reality as a woman in this society". Trujillo's pictorial work has focused on representing allegories of "female heroines in a futuristic perspective".

She published her first comics in the Chilean adult comics magazine Trauko (1989) and while living in New York City, she published her series "Maliki 4 ojos" in the weekly The Clinic (2002/2003). As a cartoonist, she published her comics in the newspaper El Desconcierto (2013) and in the online magazine Había una vez (2014/2015). She has been invited to numerous comic book festivals and events related to the dissemination of graphic storytelling (Caracas Book Fair, Venezuela, 2009; Latin American Comic Symposium, Stanford University, 2011; Comicópolis, Buenos Aires, Argentina, 2013; Lima en cuadritos, Lima, Peru, 2013).
