= Sindoni Tower =

Coordinates: 10°14′55″N 67°35′26″W

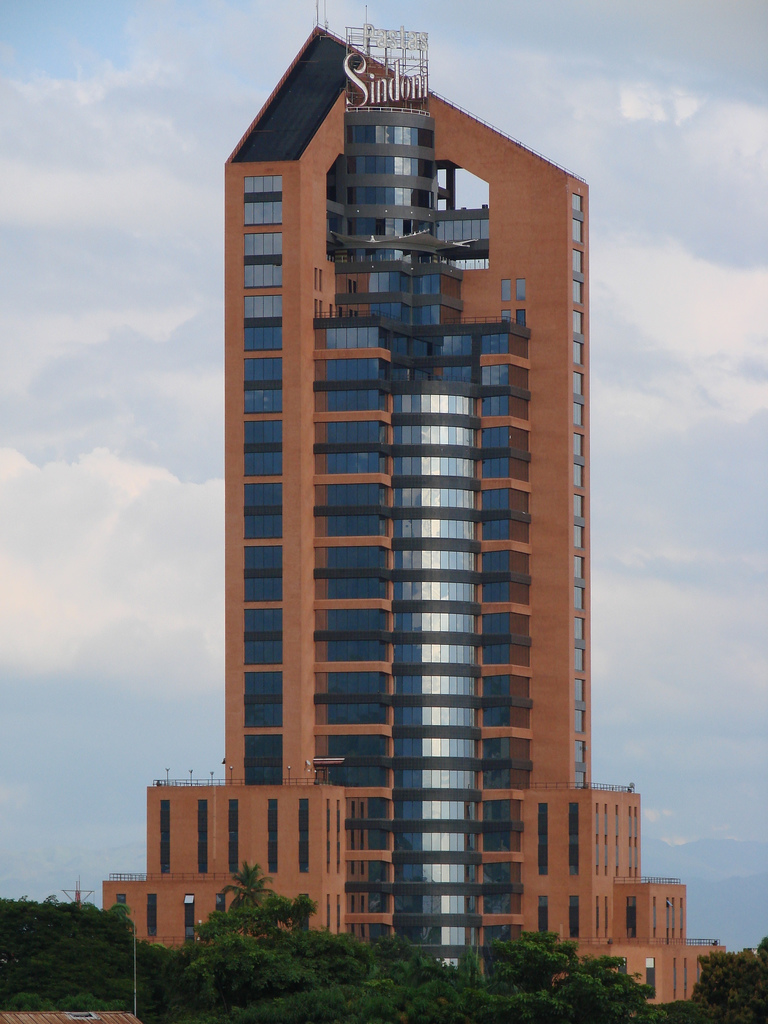

General information
- Status: Completed
- Type: Office
- Location: Maracay, Venezuela
- Completed: 1999
- Owner: Grupo de Empresas Sindoni C. A.

Height
- Roof: 125 m (410 ft)

Technical details
- Floor count: 32

The Sindoni Tower (also known as Filippo Sindoni Tower or the Torre Sindoni in Spanish) is a skyscraper located in the Venezuelan city of Maracay. It is the highest tower in the city. It has an estimated height of 125 meters, and about 32 floors, making it the eighth tallest building in Venezuela, as well as being one of the newest buildings in height. It was opened in 1999. The tower is mostly used as a commercial office space.

== See also ==
- List of tallest buildings in South America
- List of tallest buildings in Venezuela
