= Parque Central Complex fire =

Skyscraper fire in Caracas, Venezuela

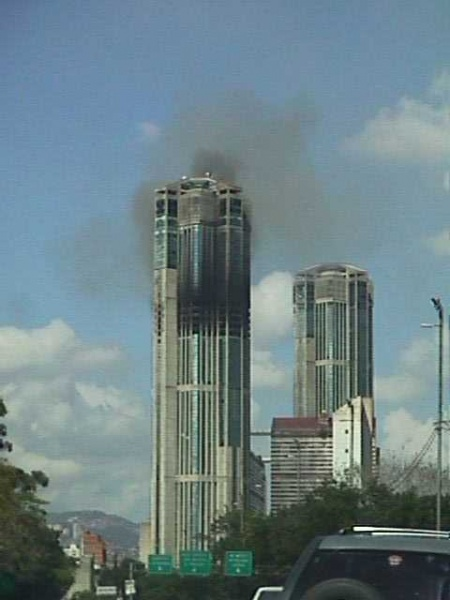
The tower ablaze in the fire of 2004

The Parque Central Complex fire was a fire on 17 October 2004, that destroyed almost one-third of the East Tower of the Parque Central Urban Complex in Caracas, Venezuela. At least 20 floors were completely destroyed by the fire, although the building was able to withstand more than 15 hours of fire without collapsing due to its strong structure.

== Fire ==
Just before midnight, 17 October 2004, a fire broke out in the East Tower, which housed government offices, one of the highest buildings in South America at the time. The fire affected the 34th floor to the 50th floor. The tower sustained major damage because firefighting efforts were hampered by non-working automatic sprinkler and standpipe systems. It was feared that the concrete-and-steel structure could be damaged severely enough to collapse, and internal firefighting efforts were pulled in the interest of safety. Two steel decks partially collapsed, and deflection in some steel beams was later found to be severe. The fire burned itself out in the early morning of 19 October.

=== Aftermath ===
Nine years later, in November 2013, there was a minor fire in the West Tower. The fire was on the 16th floor, in which 420 people were evacuated and 15 were rescued, with no fatalities. The fire was immediately controlled so that it did not affect the upper floors of the tower. Fire Department officials presumed that the fire occurred in a trash chute.

== Restoration ==
As part of the recovery plan for the East Tower, an antenna was installed at the end of 2012. The antenna has a height of 30 meters, an element that increases the height of the tower to 255 meters. However, since the antenna is not part of the main structure of the tower, it is not taken into account to redefine its height, so the building would remain at its original height of 225 meters. After eight years of reconstruction, it was not until 2013 that the work was completely finished.

Despite not being completed that year, it was possible to operate offices in the mezzanines belonging to the Public Prosecutor's Office, the SAIME civil registry, the Capital District government and the Ministry of Women, as well as on higher levels, although, beyond the 27th floor, the elevators are "out of service". The complex has a convention hall, restaurants and an observation deck located on the 53rd floor. As of 2015, the structure was operational, although its restoration continues. and the presence of abandonment inside the towers remained.
