= Basilica of St. Teresa =

Coordinates: 10.50175°N 66.91558°W

- Basílica de Santa Teresa
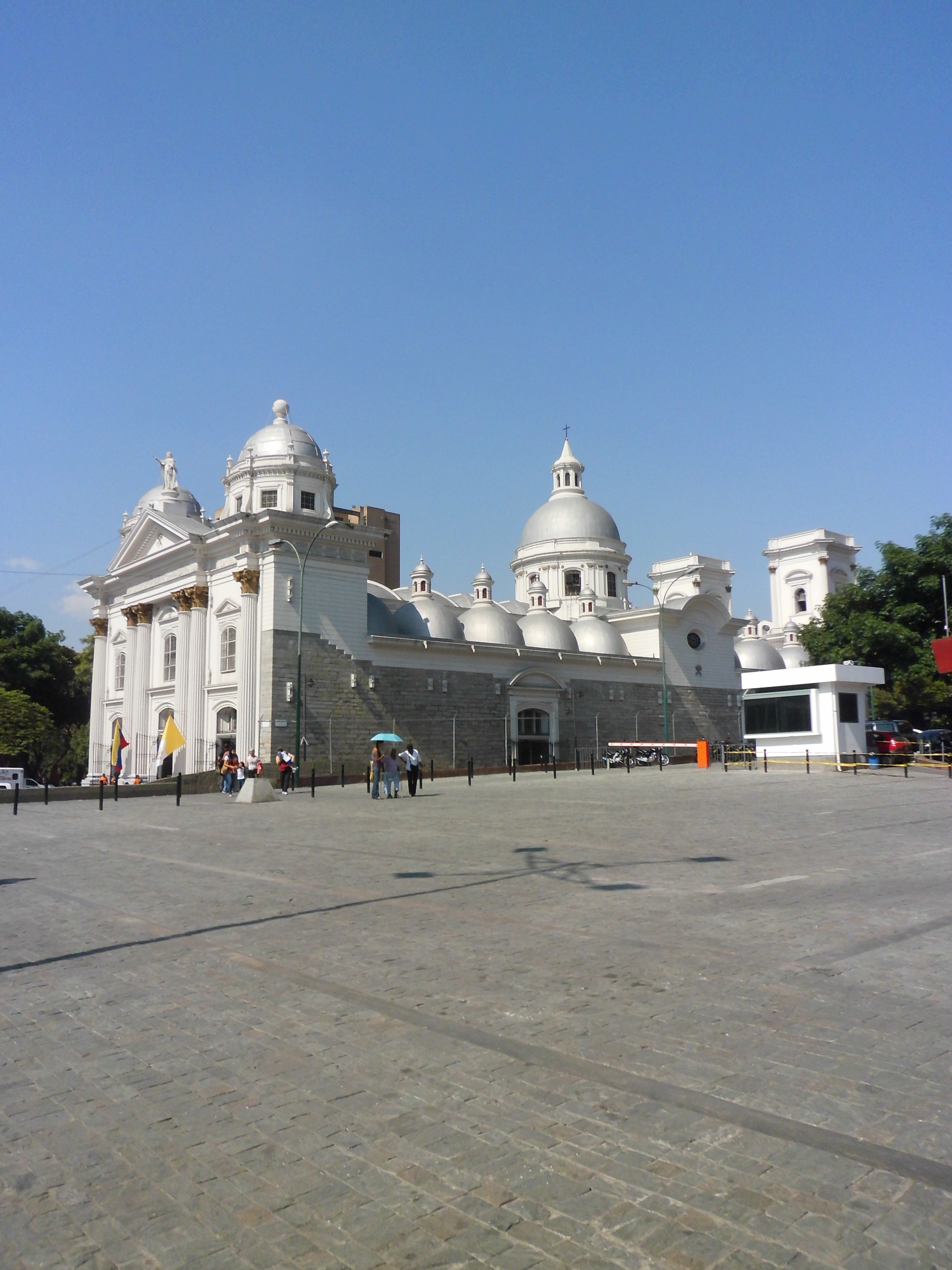
- Basilica of St. Teresa
- Location: Caracas
- Country: Venezuela
- Denomination: Roman Catholic Church

The Basilica of St. Teresa (Spanish: Basílica de Santa Teresa) It is one of the most important Catholic churches in Caracas, capital of Venezuela. It is the main center of veneration of the image of the Nazarene in San Pablo Easter, is located on the corner of La Palma and Santa Teresa in the city center in Santa Teresa Parish of Libertador Municipality.

This basilica is composed of two neoclassical churches joined together by a dome where it is placed under the high altar, the west facade is dedicated to Santa Ana and Santa Teresa east facade.

== History ==
The President Antonio Guzmán Blanco ordered the demolition of the church of San Felipe Neri and other Catholic churches of Caracas, but then ordered the construction of a monumental church in the same place that occupied the San Felipe Neri, in 1870 commissioning project architect Juan Hurtado Manrique, the execution works of the church started in 1877 and ended in 1881, on 28 October of that year is inaugurated the structure like Church of Santa Teresa in honor of his wife Doña Ana Teresa a devout Catholic.

On 9 April 1952, 50 people were trampled to death after someone shouted "Fire!". 40 people were arrested in connection with the crush.

On 9 December 1959 it was declared a National Historic Landmark.

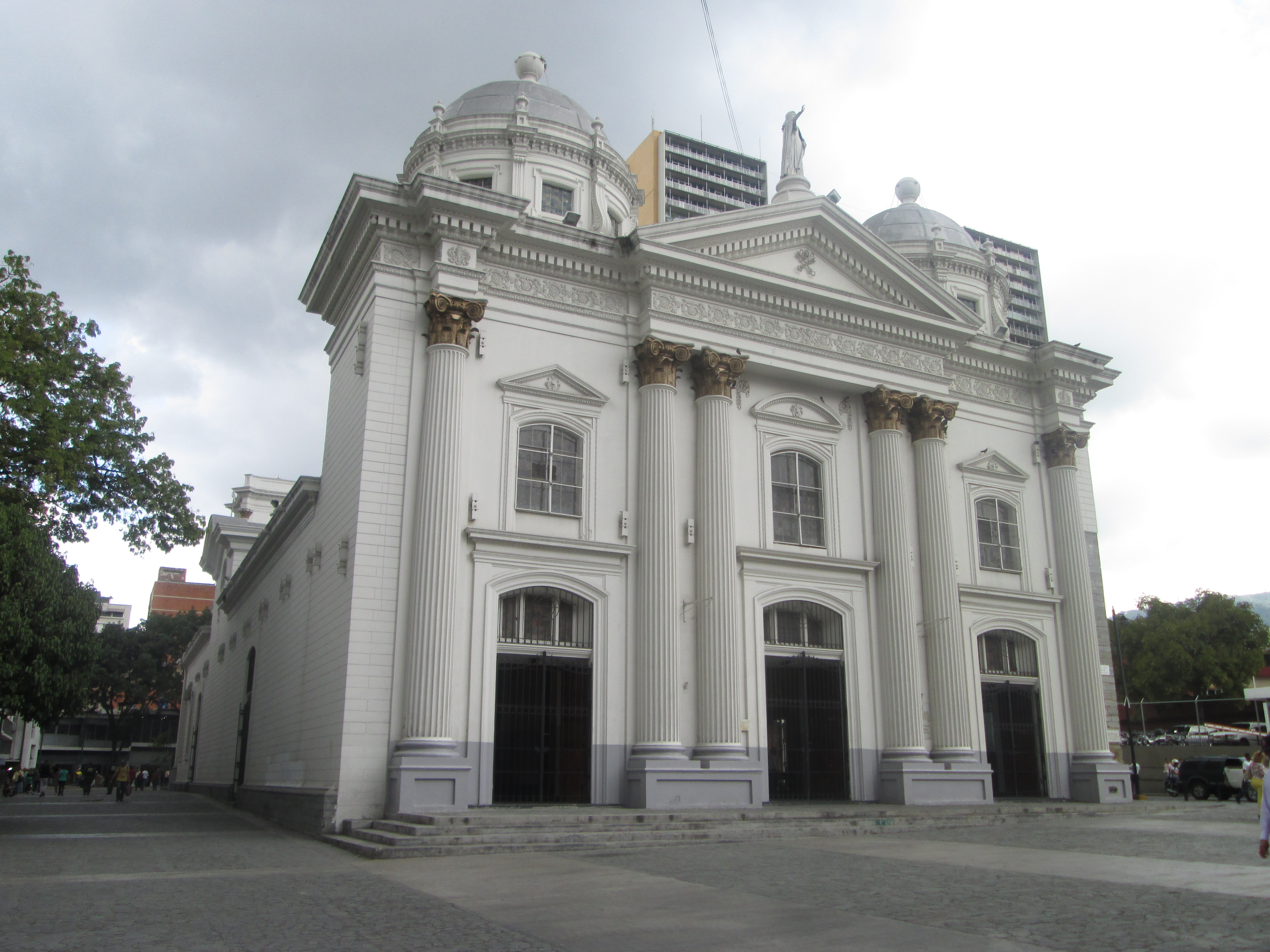
View of the facade

== See also ==
- Santa Teresa Church tragedy
- Roman Catholicism in Venezuela
- Basilica of Santa Capilla
