= Caracas Museum of Contemporary Art =

Art museum in Caracas, Venezuela

Caracas Museum of Contemporary Art Armando Reverón
- Museo de Arte Contemporáneo de Caracas Armando Reverón
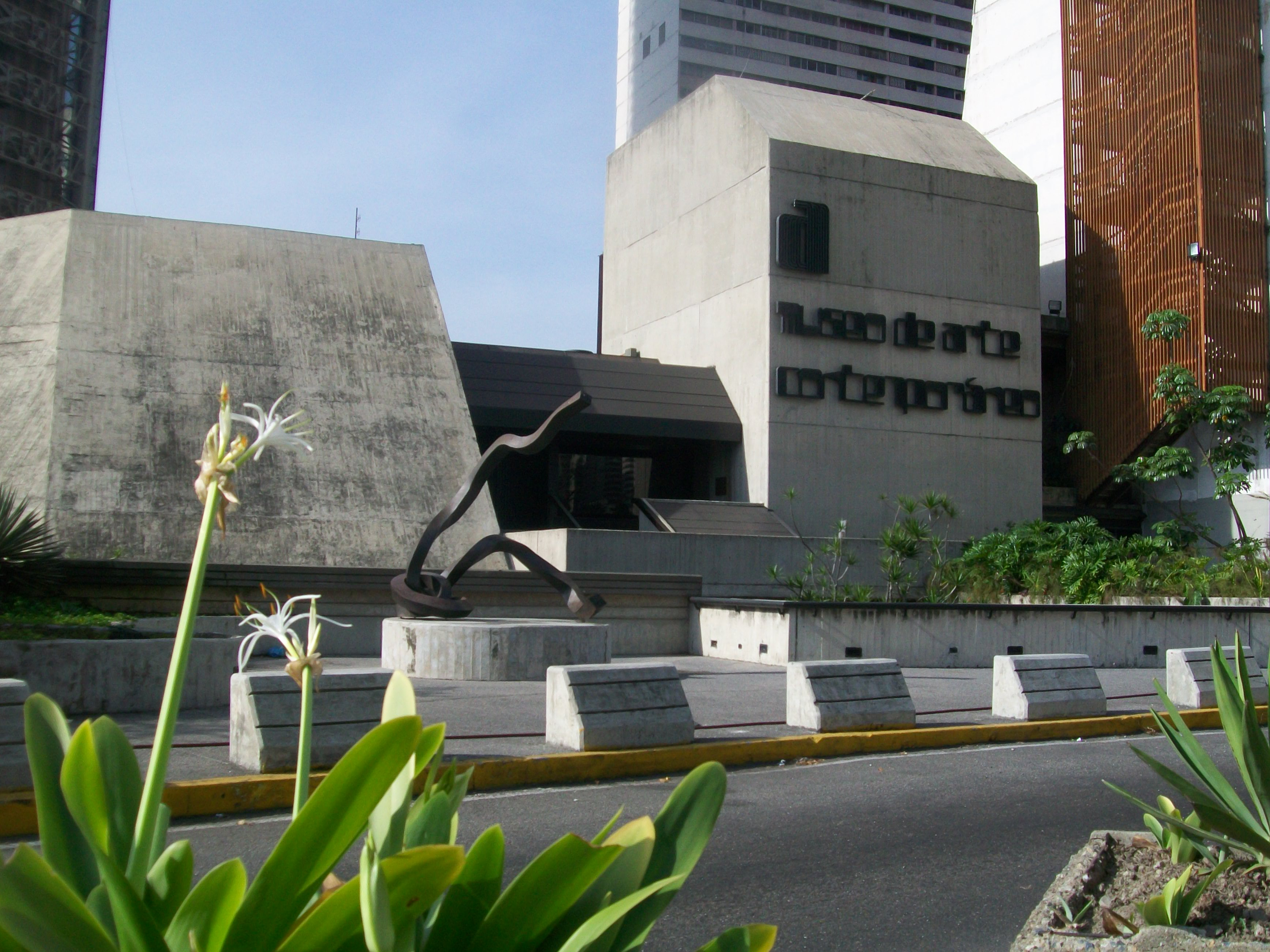
- Former name: Museo de Arte Contemporáneo de Caracas (1973–1990); Museo de Arte Contemporáneo de Caracas Sofía Ímber (1990–2006)
- Established: 30 August 1973
- Location: Parque Central Complex, Caracas, Venezuela
- Coordinates: 10°29′54″N 66°53′59″W
- Type: Art museum
- Collection size: 5,000
- Founder: Sofía Ímber
- Director: Edgar Álvarez Estrada
- Public transit access: Bellas Artes; Parque Central

Caracas Museum of Contemporary Art Armando Reverón (Spanish: Museo de Arte Contemporáneo de Caracas Armando Reverón, MACCAR), also known simply as the Caracas Museum of Contemporary Art (Spanish: Museo de Arte Contemporáneo de Caracas, MACC), is a museum of modern and contemporary art located in the Parque Central Complex in Caracas, Venezuela.

The museum was founded on 30 August 1973 by the journalist and art patron Sofía Ímber, who also served as its director from 1973 to her dismissal during the Chavist cultural revolution in 2001. It opened in 1974 and was the first museum in Venezuela to offer a specialist art library, a formal children's and adults' learning area, a special education department for the blind, and a multimedia arts centre.

The museum's collections contain 5,000 pieces of art, including 700 sculptures. It contains works by Pablo Picasso, Claude Monet, Wassily Kandinsky, Fernand Léger, Piet Mondrian, Andy Warhol, Francis Bacon, Alexander Calder, Jesús Rafael Soto, Henri Matisse, Marc Chagall, Marisol Escobar, Marcel Duchamp, Joan Miró, and Georges Braque.

== History ==
=== Early years and Sofia Ímber's directorship (1973–2001) ===
The museum was designed by Nikolajs Sidorkovs, an architect at Siso & Shaw & Associates, the company that had designed the surrounding Parque Central Complex. It repurposed an existing gallery, with further renovations and new rooms added in 1980, 1990 and 2002.

Sofía Ímber was appointed director of the museum at its foundation in 1973. Under her leadership, the MACC's collections grew rapidly and she oversaw numerous exhibitions. The museum also sought to connect with ordinary people through outreach programmes, such as holding art classes for local children and "art buses" which travelled to the city slums. To honour Ímber's work, Venezuelan president Carlos Andrés Pérez officially changed the name of the museum to Museo de Arte Contemporáneo de Caracas Sofía Ímber (MACCSI) in 1990. Ímber's name was removed from the museum in 2006, due to her criticism of the Chávez administration.

=== 2001–present ===
During a broadcast of Aló Presidente in January 2001, Venezuelan president Hugo Chávez dismissed director Sofía Ímber from her position. He claimed that under Ímber's leadership the museum had become elitist. By placing it under the government-controlled Fundación de Museos Nacionales, Chávez could use it to further his ideological aims. Journalists and art critics claim that this led to a narrower selection of art being displayed and purchased by the museum.

Several thefts have occurred in the history of the museum, most notably the theft of Henri Matisse's Odalisque in Red Pantaloons. The painting disappeared from the museum's vaults between 1998 and 2002, though journalist Marianela Balbi, in her book El rapto de la Odalisca, believes it was stolen between December 1999 and mid-2000, when the painting was moved due to the threat of flooding. The thieves replaced the original painting with a poor-quality forgery, which led to the theft going unnoticed for several years.

The Venezuelan Crisis has resulted in operational difficulties for the museum, including blackouts which have left the galleries without electricity or light. There have also been allegations of neglect and poor collection management, including damage from flooding, humidity and mould, as well as criticisms of poor security and the cancellations of catalogues and exhibitions. The museum closed for several months between 2021–2022, citing challenges posed by the COVID-19 pandemic. In addition, the surrounding Parque Central area has fallen into disrepair, reducing footfall and tourism in neighbourhood.

In December 2017 the museum was named after Venezuelan painter Armando Reverón. Since 2018, its director is Edgar Álvarez Estrada. Entry is free for the permanent collections and temporary exhibitions.

== Directors ==
- 1974–2001: Sofía Ímber
- 2001–2003: Rita Salvestrini
- 2003–2004: Carmen Hernández
- 2004–2005: Vivian Rivas
- 2005–2007: Luis Ángel Duque
- 2007–2008: María Luz Cárdenas
- 2008: Edgar Cruz
- 2010–2011: Luis Ángel Duque
- 2011–2013: Jacqueline Rousset
- 2013–2017: Daniel Briceño
- 2017–2018: Clemente Martinez
- 2018–present: Edgar Álvarez Estrada
