= Basilica of Santa Capilla =

Coordinates: 10.5062°N 66.914°W

- Basílica Menor Santa Capilla
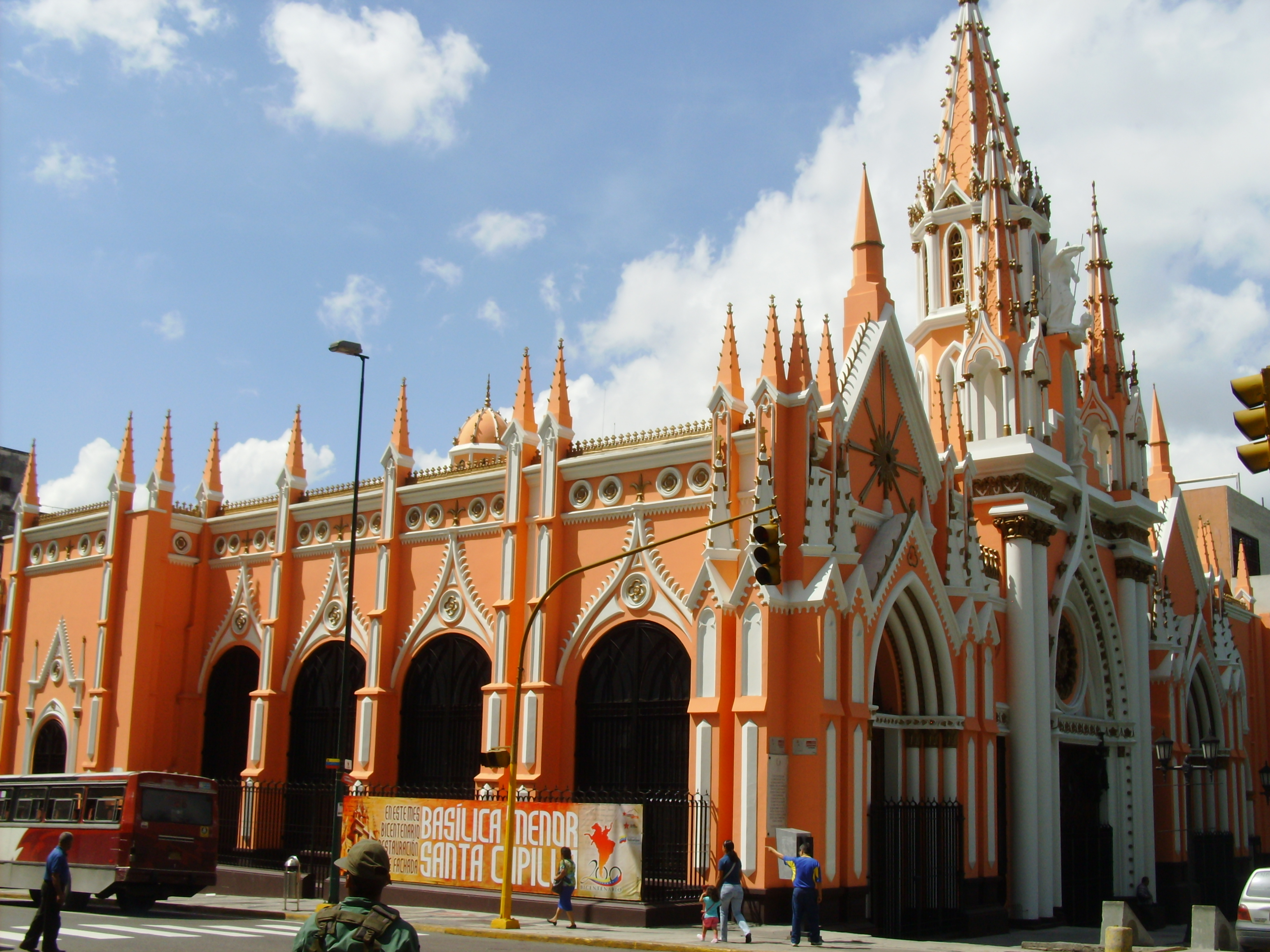
- Basilica of Santa Capilla
- Location: Caracas
- Country: Venezuela
- Denomination: Roman Catholic Church

The Basilica of Santa Capilla (Spanish: Basílica Menor Santa Capilla) It is a Roman Catholic basilica in Caracas, Venezuela located at the corner of Santa Capilla on Avenida Urdaneta. It is located in the historic center of the city, in the Cathedral Parish of Libertador Municipality. On February 16, 1979 was declared a National Historic Landmark.

Its construction was ordered by President Antonio Guzman Blanco in 1883, to the architect Juan Hurtado Manrique, with reference to the Sainte Chapelle in Paris. The new church of Santa Capilla replaced the old hermitage of San Sebastián that had been erected in 1568 and then dedicated to Saint Maurice in 1640, but only a year later is destroyed by an earthquake in 1667 it rebuilds the church with elements simple as wood and bricks. In 1812 another earthquake almost completely destroyed the church beginning its reconstruction.

In 1921 an expansion that included two aisles is made, and the August 5, 1926 is designated as Minor Basilica by Pope Pius XI. Inside the basilica they are buried some people.

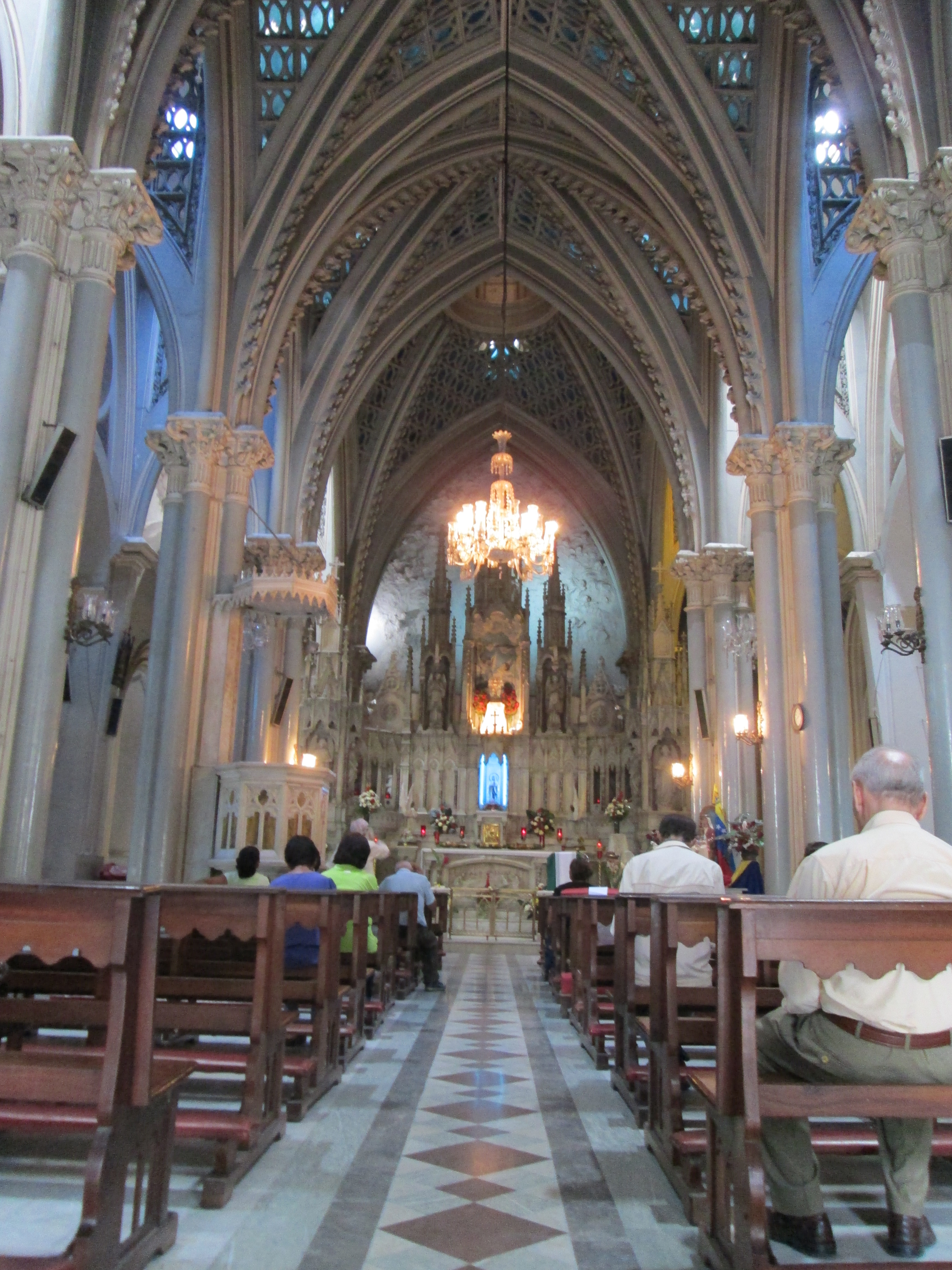
Internal view

== See also ==
- Roman Catholicism in Venezuela
- Basilica of the National Shrine of Our Lady of Coromoto
- Basilica of St. Teresa
