= Movilnet Tower =

- Torre Movilnet
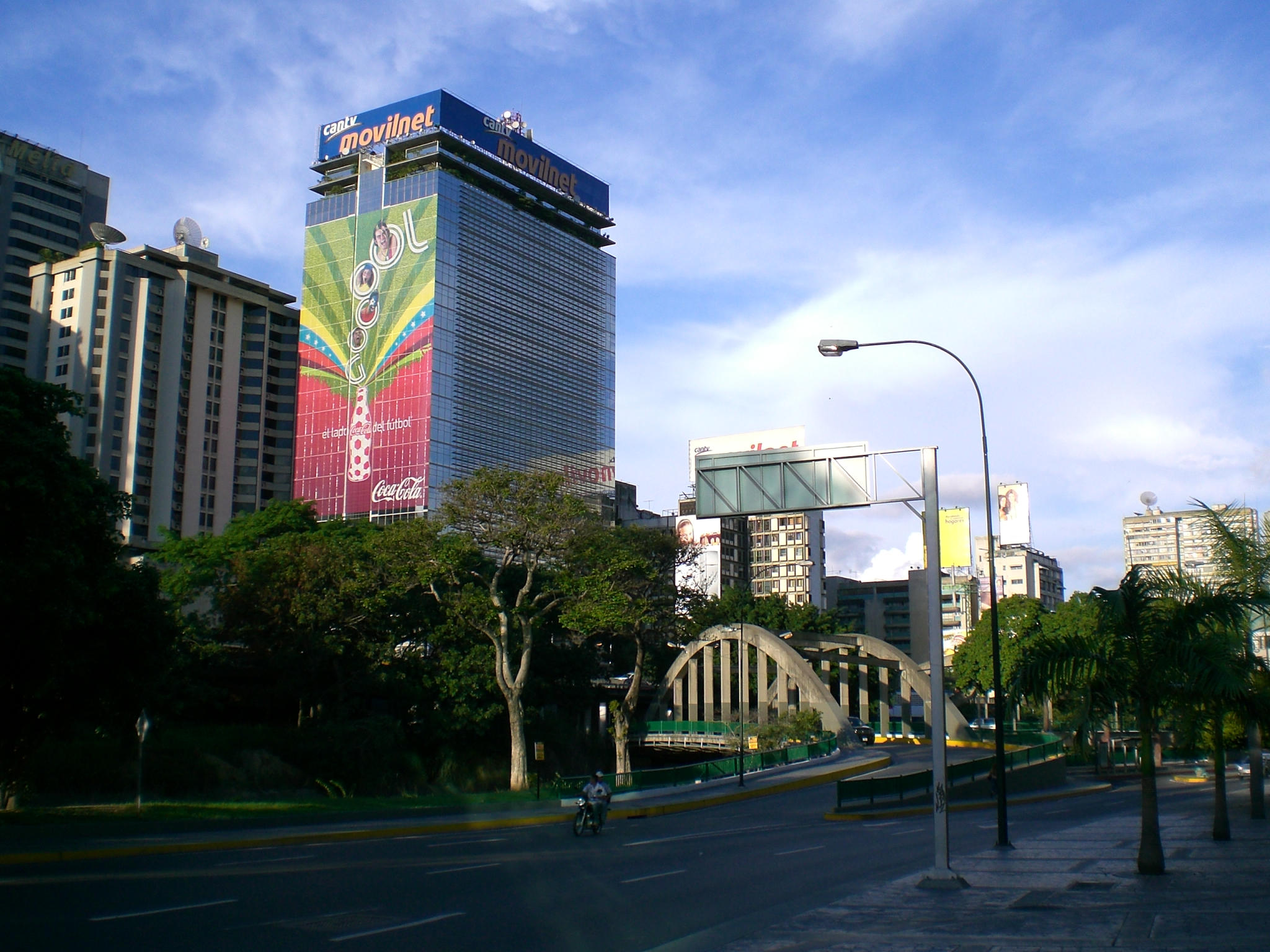
- Interactive map of the Movilnet Tower area

General information
- Status: Completed
- Type: Office
- Location: Caracas, Venezuela
- Completed: 1999
- Owner: Movilnet S. A. Compañía Anónima Nacional de Teléfonos de Venezuela (CANTV)

Height
- Roof: 125 m (410 ft)

Technical details
- Floor count: 28

The Movilnet Tower is an office skyscraper the stands at a height of 125 metres with 28 floors, located in the Francisco Fajardo Highway up to the Sabana Grande area in the parish El Recreo of Caracas, Venezuela.

== See also ==
- List of tallest buildings in South America
