= Venezuela International Book Fair =

Venezuela International Book Fair (Feria Internacional del Libro de Venezuela)
- Status: Active
- Venue: Rotary in Venezuela
- Country: Venezuela
- Inaugurated: 2005
- Attendance: 235,000 visitors
- Organiser: Instituto Autónomo Centro Nacional del Libro
- Website: www.cenal.gob.ve

The Venezuela International Book Fair (FILVEN in Spanish) is a national event organized as an initiative of the Venezuelan state since 2005 in various regions to promote reading culture and promote encounter between book readers and writers. The first editions of FILVEN were held only in Caracas, which followed the tradition of previous book fairs in Caracas dating from 1992. Years later, the fair began performing in various cities within the framework exhibition, on dates that did not necessarily coincide, during the same year. Regardless of the location and date, each regional fair retains the same name, slogan, edition number, year, honorees and image.

== Editions ==
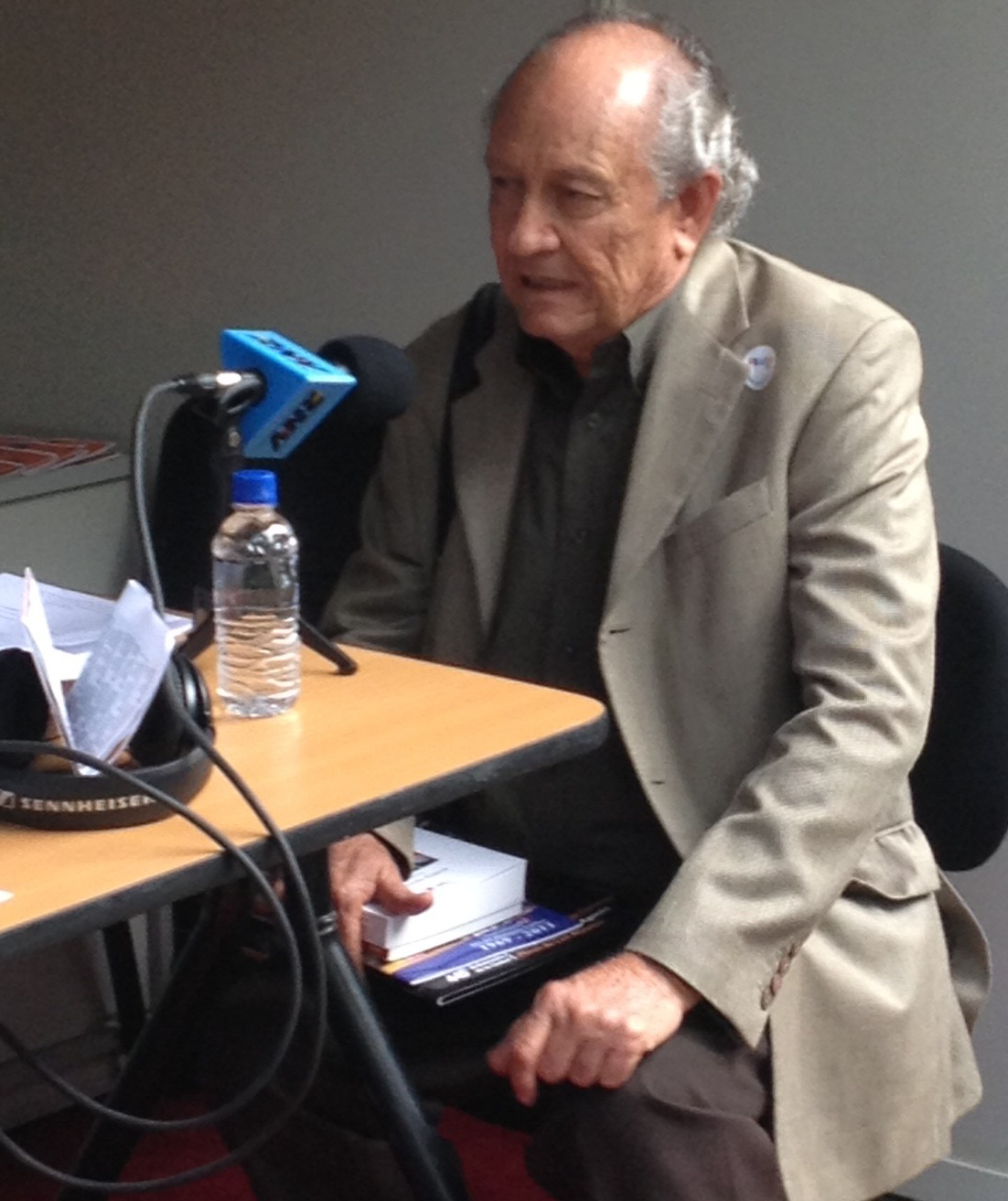
The poet Gustavo Pereira at FILVEN 2013

=== FILVEN 2005 ===
The first International Book Fair Venezuela, held now under this name, was held in Caracas for 10 days, from November 11 to 20, 2005. Representatives from 30 Latin American countries and over 60 international guests attended. The theme was "The Caribbean, a bridge of books, a sea of humanity".

=== FILVEN 2006 ===
The second International Book Fair was held in Caracas, Venezuela from November 9 to 19, 2006, an occasion on which tribute was paid to Cuba as a guest country. The Venezuelan poets Ramón Palomares, Mention National Poetry Prize for Literature 1974 and Victor Valera Mora, International Poetry Prize 2006 were also honored. The fair had 103 exhibition booths from Venezuelan publishers and 43 international publishers, and was visited by more than 80 renowned intellectuals.

=== FILVEN 2007 ===
The third International Book Fair Venezuela was conducted between October 3 and November 18, 2007, in 335 municipalities in all states of Venezuela, organized into chapters. The overall theme of the event was "the book release" and the topic of discussion was titled "America: A possible revolution", having Argentina as a guest country of honor. This year, publishers from 11 countries were linked in the "Network in Defense of Humanity" in order to contribute to the formation of emancipatory, critical and popular thought.

=== FILVEN 2008 ===
The fourth International Book Fair Venezuela took place across the country between November 7 and 16, 2008, with Ecuador as a guest of honor and Venezuelan's Stefania Mosca as an honored writer. The central theme of the event was "For a nation of readers" with more than 400 writers from 20 countries.

=== FILVEN 2009 ===
The fifth International Book Fair Venezuela took place in Caracas between November 12 and 21, 2009, with Bolivia as a guest of honor and Venezuelan José Manuel Briceño Guerrero as an honored writer. In this year there were 200 publishers and 50 international guests gave lectures and presented books, among other activities.

=== FILVEN 2010 ===
The sixth International Book Fair Venezuela was held in Caracas between November 13 and 22, 201. This year honored the Latin American countries celebrating their bicentennial of independence that year: Argentina, Chile, Colombia, Mexico and Venezuela. The motto of this year was "The people of the Great Homeland write their history"

=== FILVEN 2011 ===
The seventh International Book Fair Venezuela was held between March 19 and 27, 2011 in Caracas. This date was changed to avoid the rainy season. Its honored authors were Andrés Bello and Juan Germán Roscio, The theme for this year was "Glory to the fierce town" and was attended by 21 international publishers and 103 national publishers.

=== FILVEN 2012 ===
The eighth International Book Fair Venezuela was conducted between May 10 and July 29, 2012, throughout the country. The guest country of honor was Uruguay and the honored author was Luis Britto García. This year some 245 national and international publishers were represented.

=== FILVEN 2013 ===
The ninth International Book Fair Venezuela was conducted between April 24 and November 30, 2013, throughout the country

=== FILVEN 2014 ===
The tenth International Book Fair Venezuela was held between March 14 and 23, 2014 in Caracas. The guest country of honor was Brazil and the honored writer was César Chirinos. The theme of this edition was "Prospects and challenges of publication in Latin America." There were113 exhibitors that were represented nationally and 29 international exhibitors.
