= Centro Simón Bolívar Towers =

Buildings in the centre of Caracas

Coordinates: 10°30′10″N 66°54′58″W

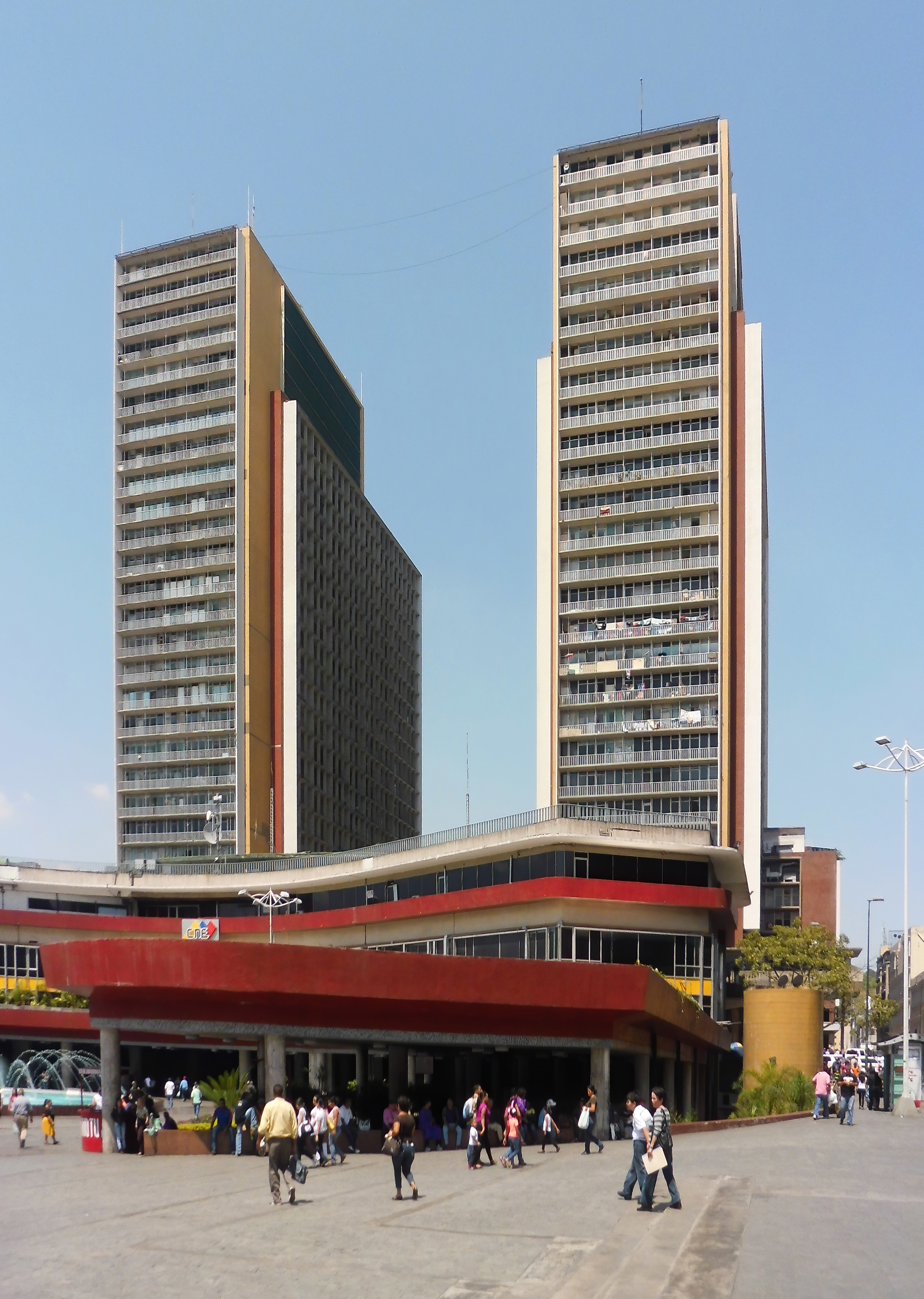
- Interactive map of the Centro Simón Bolívar Towers area

General information
- Status: Completed
- Type: Office
- Location: Caracas, Venezuela
- Construction started: 1948
- Completed: 1954
- Opening: December 6, 1954

Height
- Roof: 103 m (338 ft)

Technical details
- Floor count: 32

Design and construction
- Architect: Cipriano Domínguez
- Developer: Centro Simón Bolívar

The Centro Simón Bolívar Towers TCSB also known as the Towers of Silence is a building with a pair of 32-story towers, each measuring 103 meters in height, in El Silencio district, Caracas, Venezuela. Built during the time of the presidency of Marcos Pérez Jiménez, the TCSB was opened to the public on December 6, 1954.

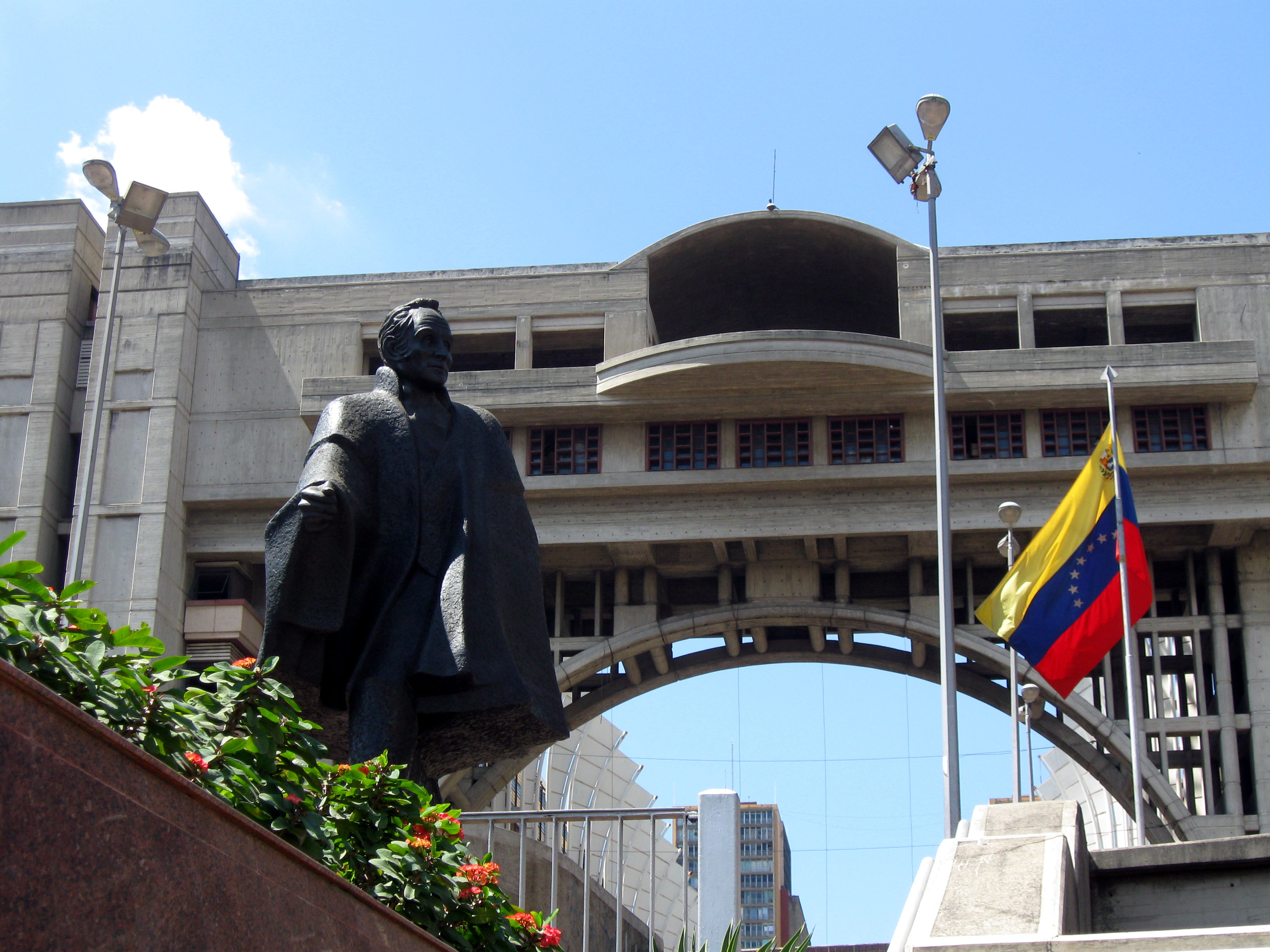
Towers of Simón Bolívar Center, as seen underneath the arch of the Palace of Justice, Caracas

== Features ==
The TCSB is an example of functionalist architecture that includes the concept of integrating artistic works into the building. When first built it was a symbol of Venezuelan national identity, of a country emerging from its agrarian and petroleum-based economy, at the beginning of its industrialization. The TCSB is thus imposed as a simple aesthetic symbol of modernity and of the long-term development facing the country.

The TCSB is suspended in the air above the ground on stilts, allowing the public to traverse beneath it unhindered. The symmetry of the building is rigorous, with the twin towers arising from two parallel wings, consisting of a system of plazas, walkways, porches, doorways, commercial areas and underground parking; the Bolivar Avenue passes underneath.

The towers occupied the title of the tallest twin towers in Venezuela until the construction of the towers of Parque Central Complex along the same road in the city of Caracas.

On February 7, 1982, the climber Dan Goodwin scaled the outside of the towers using only his hands and feet.

== Gallery ==
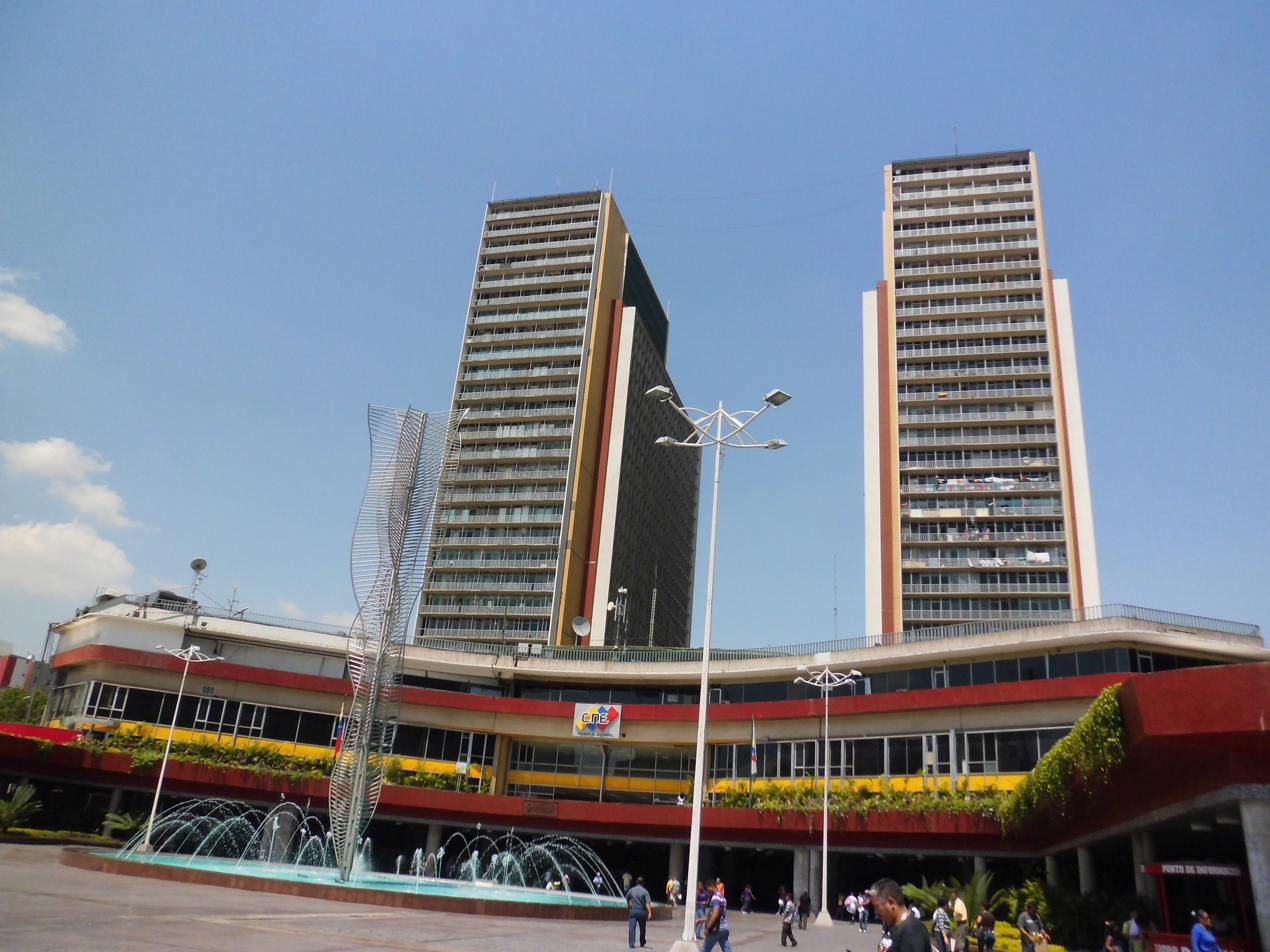
South and North Tower Simon Bolivar Center views from Diego Plaza Ibarra.

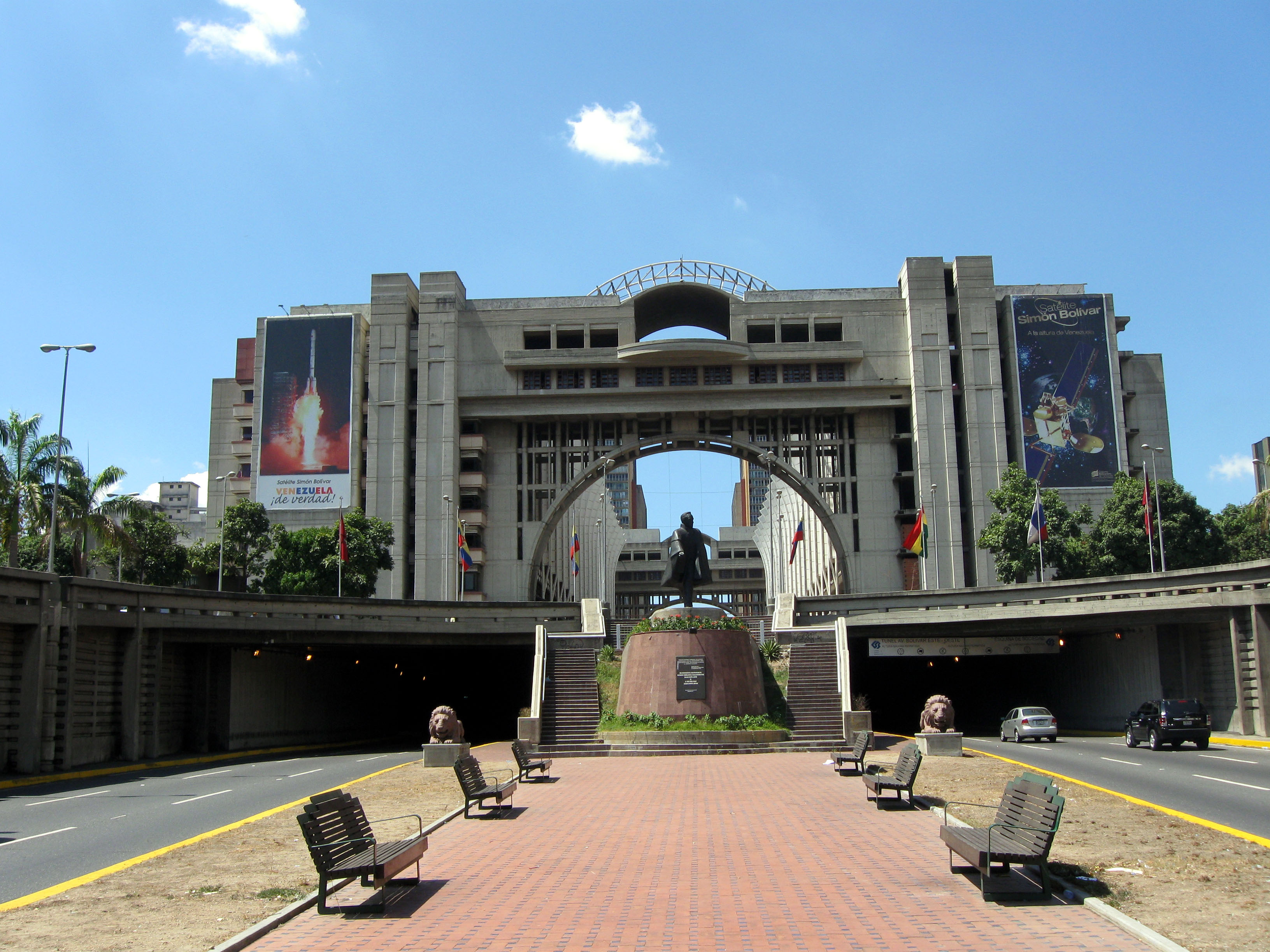
East façade from Avenida Bolivar.

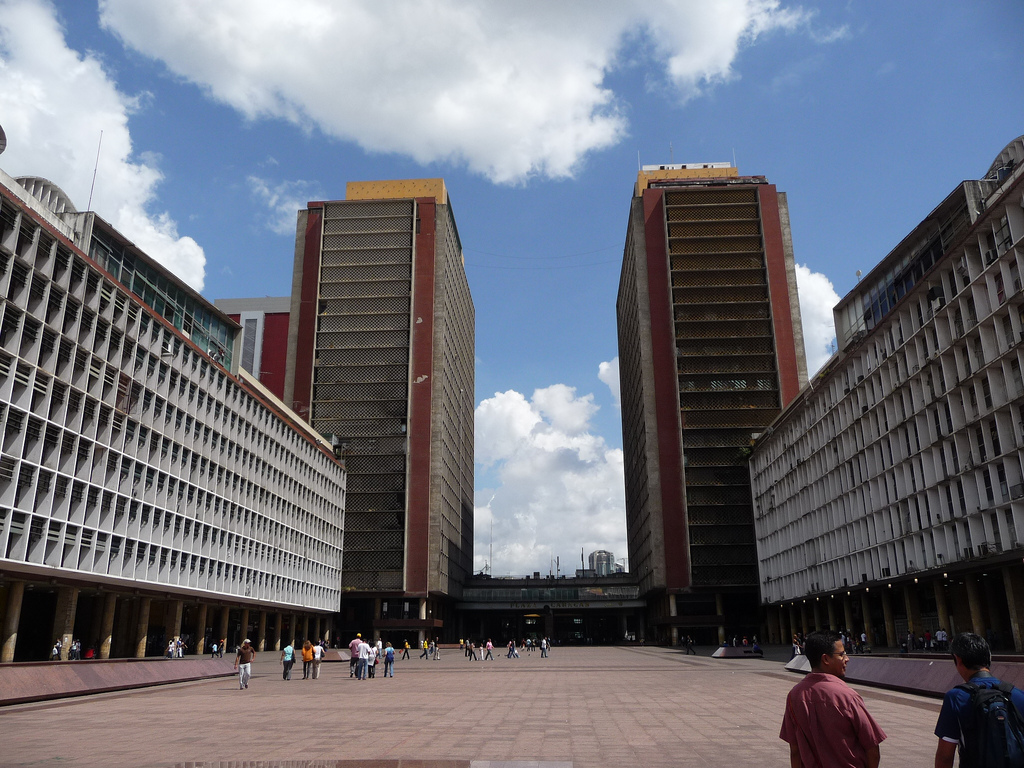
West facade, Plaza Caracas.

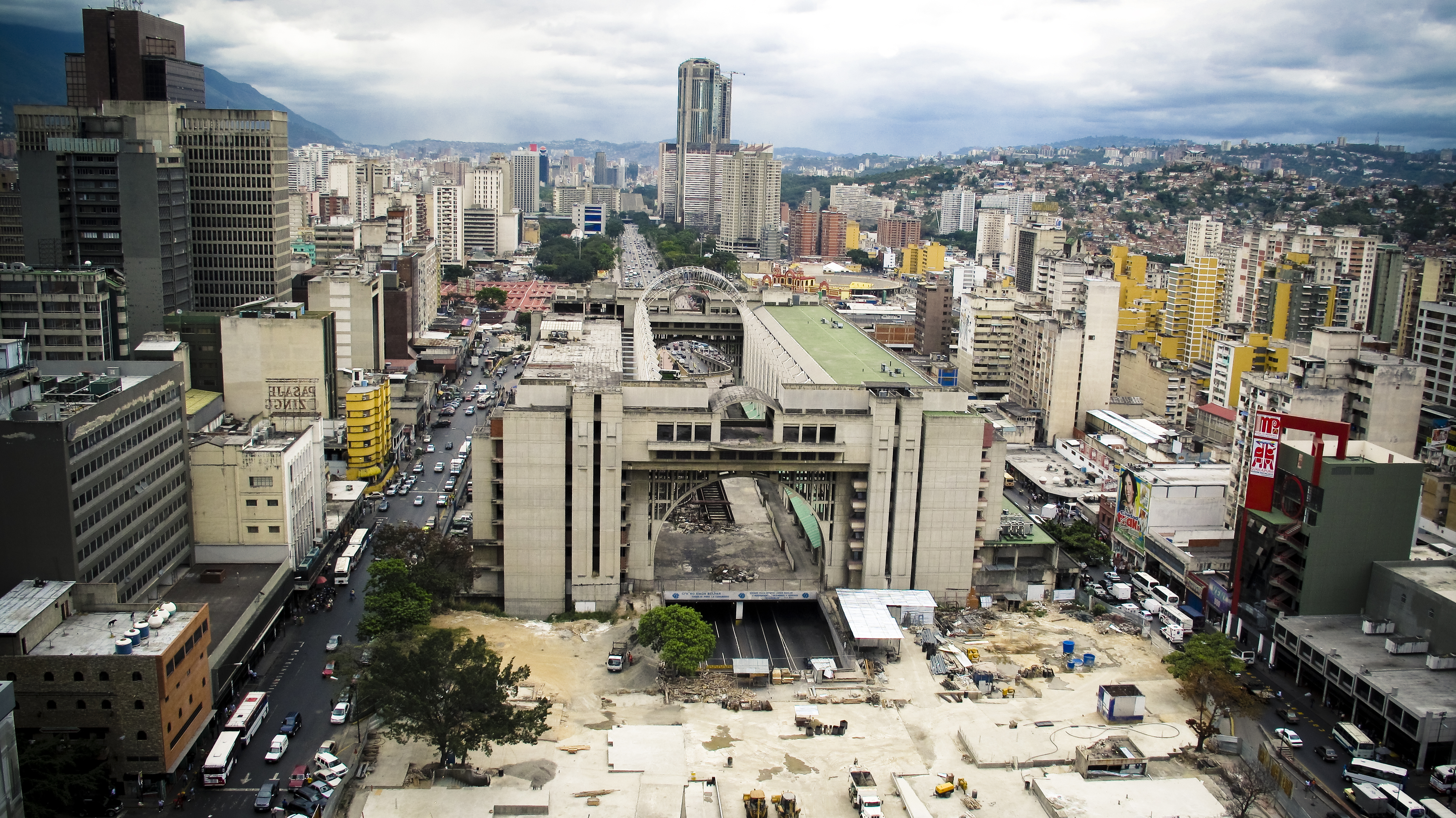
View of the reconstruction of the Plaza Diego Ibarra.

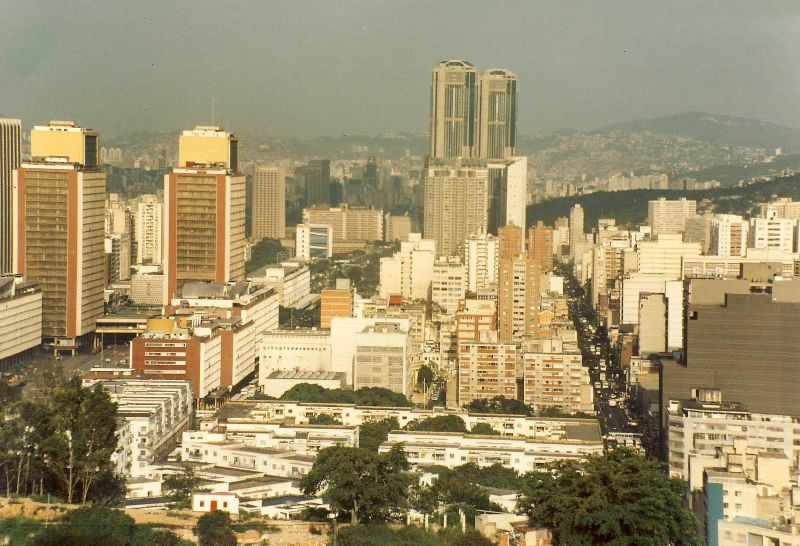
Having observed panaromica where Simon Bolivar Center towers from the west of the City.

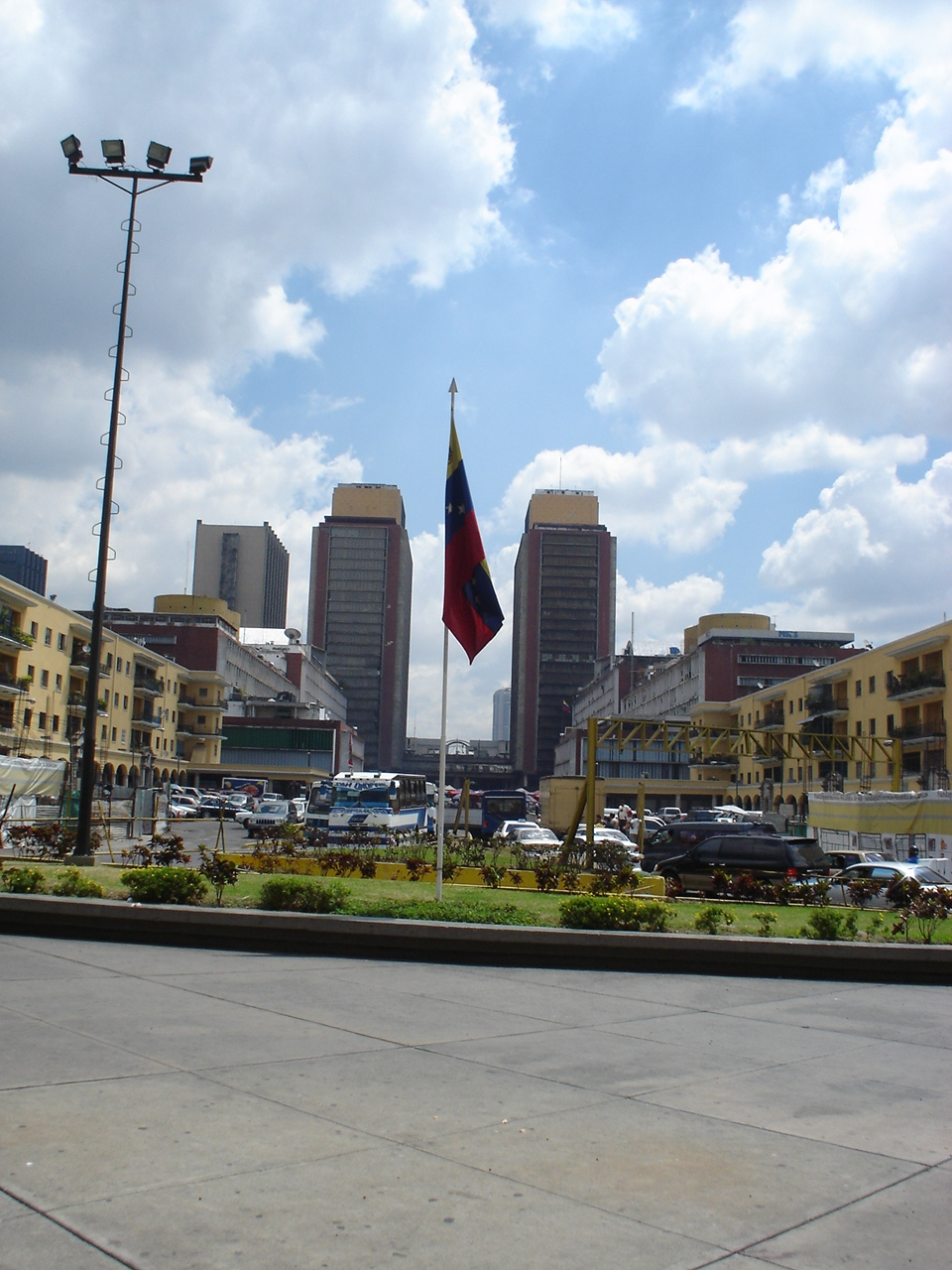
West Facade view from the Urbanisation El Silencio.

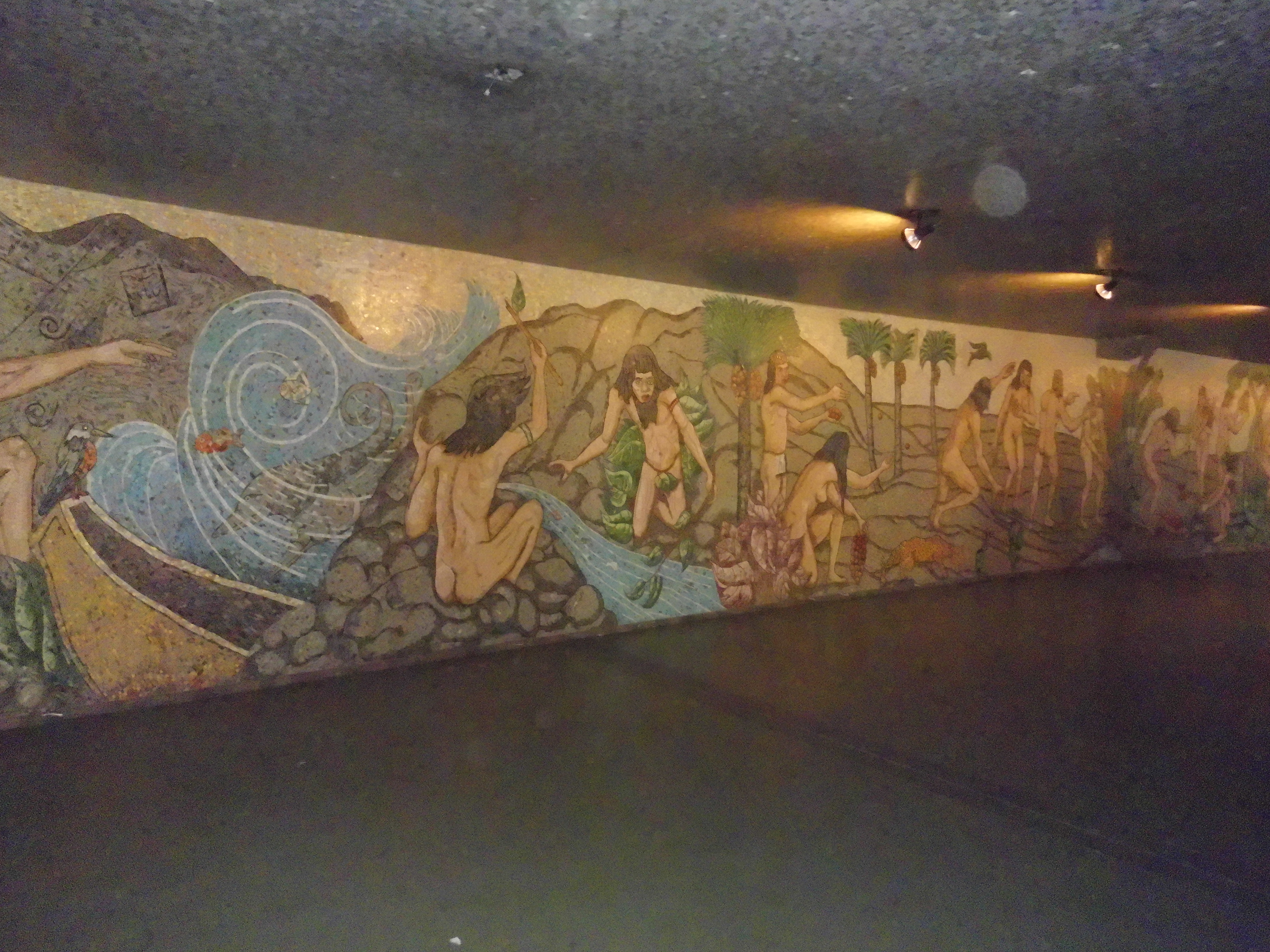
Mural The Myth of Amalivaca, work by artist César Rengifo.

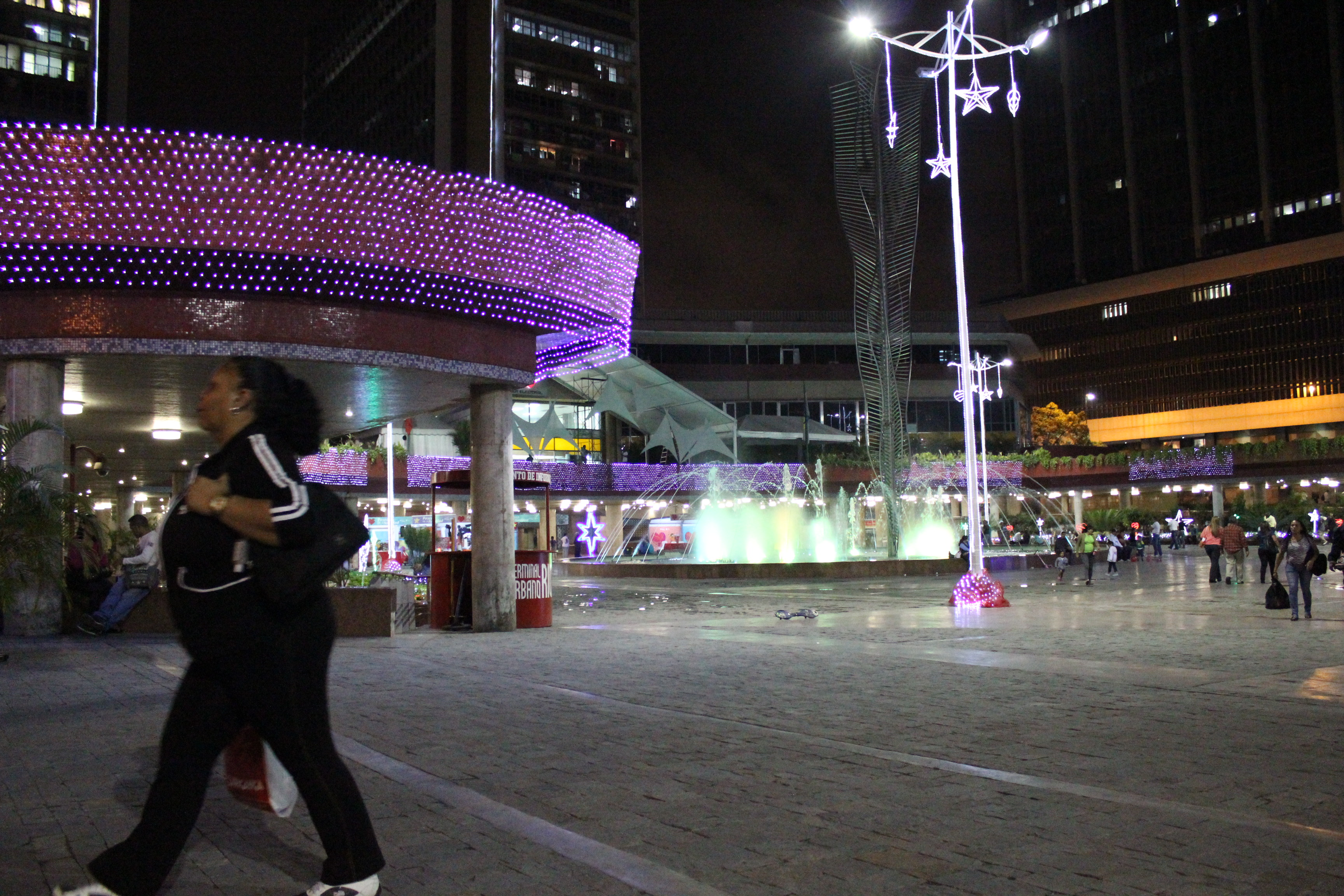
Night view of the Plaza Diego Ibarra
