= Parque Central Complex =

Mixed-use development in Caracas, Venezuela

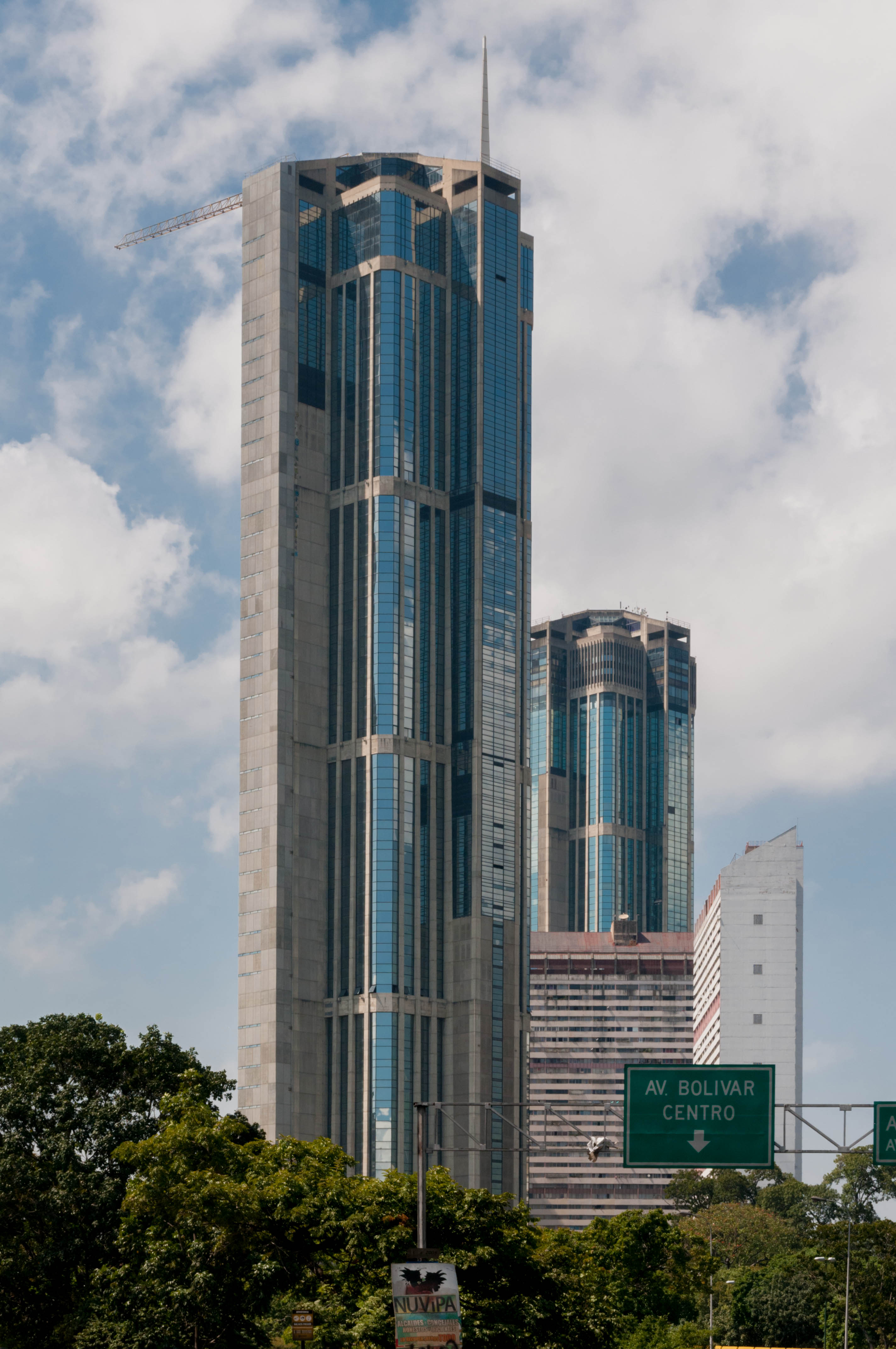
- Parque Central Complex

General information
- Status: Completed
- Type: Mixed-use
- Location: Caracas, Venezuela
- Coordinates: 10°29′53.9″N 66°54′04.7″W
- Construction started: 1970
- Completed: 1972 (Residential Buildings); 1979 (West Tower); 1983 (East Tower)
- Opening: 1983

Height
- Antenna spire: 255.0 m (836.6 ft)
- Roof: 225.0 m (738.2 ft) (Twin Towers); 127.0 m (416.7 ft) (Residential Buildings)

Technical details
- Floor count: 64 (Twin Towers); 45 (Residential Buildings)
- Floor area: 1,400 m^{2}
- Lifts/elevators: 26

Design and construction
- Architects: Henrique Siso Maury & Daniel Fernández-Shaw
- Developer: Centro Simón Bolívar
- Main contractor: Siso-Shaw & Associates

The Parque Central Complex is a housing, commercial and cultural development, implemented by Centro Simón Bolívar and located in El Conde in the center of the city of Caracas, Venezuela adjacent to Paseo Vargas.

Within the complex are the Parque Central Twin Towers, two skyscrapers that have for decades been an architectural icon of Caracas and its tallest buildings. From 1979 (when the West Tower was opened) until 2003, they held the title of tallest skyscrapers in Latin America until they were overtaken by Torre Mayor in Mexico City. Today (as of April 2020) the Parque Central Towers are South America's 6th tallest skyscrapers and the 22nd tallest in Latin America, after Torres Obispado in Monterrey, Gran Torre Santiago in Santiago (Chile), and many buildings in Panama City, Mexico City, and Balneário Camboriú. Parque Central towers were the tallest twin buildings in Latin America, though they have since been overtaken by the Edifício Yachthouse in Balneário Camboriú, Brazil.

Since its opening, Parque Central has been a point of reference in Caracas and is its main landmark. It houses many cultural and government institutions and is adjacent to the cultural district of museums in Caracas.

== History ==
In 1969, Enrique Delfino Arriens, engineer and CEO of the construction company Delpre CA, submitted a draft to the president of Central Park, Centro Simón Bolívar, for the construction of an urban development between Lecuna and Bolivar avenues of urbanization El Conde de Caracas during the period of then-President of the Republic Rafael Caldera.

In 1970, construction of the Tacagua, Caroata, Catuche, Tajamar, San Martín, El Tejar, Anauco and Mohedano towers was underway. All eight buildings were residential with 317 apartments each, and each building was 127 meters and 44-storeys tall. These buildings were finished in 1972, while two commercial and office towers, known as Central Park Towers, were constructed between 1970 and 1983. The Anauco apart-hotel became a 4-star Hilton in 1973 until 2003. Since then it has been administered by the Venezuelan government as the Anauco Suites.

The Central Park complex also houses the Museo de Arte Contemporaneo de Caracas, The Children's Museum of Caracas, The Plenary Hall, 8 conference rooms, a swimming academy, movie theaters, a heliport and a parish center, among others.

== The Twin Towers ==
The Twin Towers of Central Park or Central Park Towers are a pair of 225 m tall skyscrapers. Between the completion of the west tower in 1979 and the completion of Gran Torre Costanera in Santiago (topped out in 2012), the 59-storey skyscrapers were the tallest in South America. The east tower was completed in 1983, four years later. Until 2003, they were also the tallest in Latin America until surpassed by less than 1 meter by Torre Mayor in Mexico City.

The towers take their name from the green refuge in the heart of Caracas' urban jungle, but are in fact in the midst of a vast complex of office buildings and amenities. The view from inside offers panoramic access to the city and the surrounding mountains.

On February 14, 1982, high rise firefighting and rescue advocate Dan Goodwin, invited by Venezuelan television company Venevisión, climbed up the outside of the Parque Central Complex.

== Fire ==
Just before midnight, October 17, 2004, a fire broke out in the East Tower, which housed government offices. The fire affected regions from the 34th floor to the 50th floor. The tower sustained major damage because firefighting efforts were hampered by non-working automatic sprinkler and standpipe systems. It was feared that the concrete-and-steel structure could be damaged severely enough to collapse, and internal firefighting efforts were pulled in the interest of safety. Two steel decks partially collapsed, and deflection in some steel beams was later found to be severe. The fire burned itself out in the early morning of October 19.

Nine years later, on November 12, 2013 there was a minor fire in the West Tower, the fire was on the 16th floor. 420 people were evacuated and 15 were rescued. There were no fatalities. The fire was immediately controlled so that it did not affect the upper floors of the tower. Fire Department officials presumed that the fire occurred in a trash chute.

== Restoration of the East Tower ==
Part of the East Tower's recovery plan involved the installation of a 30-meter antenna representing the sword of Simón Bolívar. The antenna has a height of 30 meters, increasing the height of the tower to 255 meters. The West Tower did not receive an antenna, leaving the East Tower taller than the West Tower.

== See also ==
- List of tallest buildings in South America
- List of tallest twin buildings and structures in the world
- Centro Simón Bolívar Towers
