= Polar Towers =

Two-tower building complex in Venezuela

Coordinates: 10.4979°N 66.8865°W

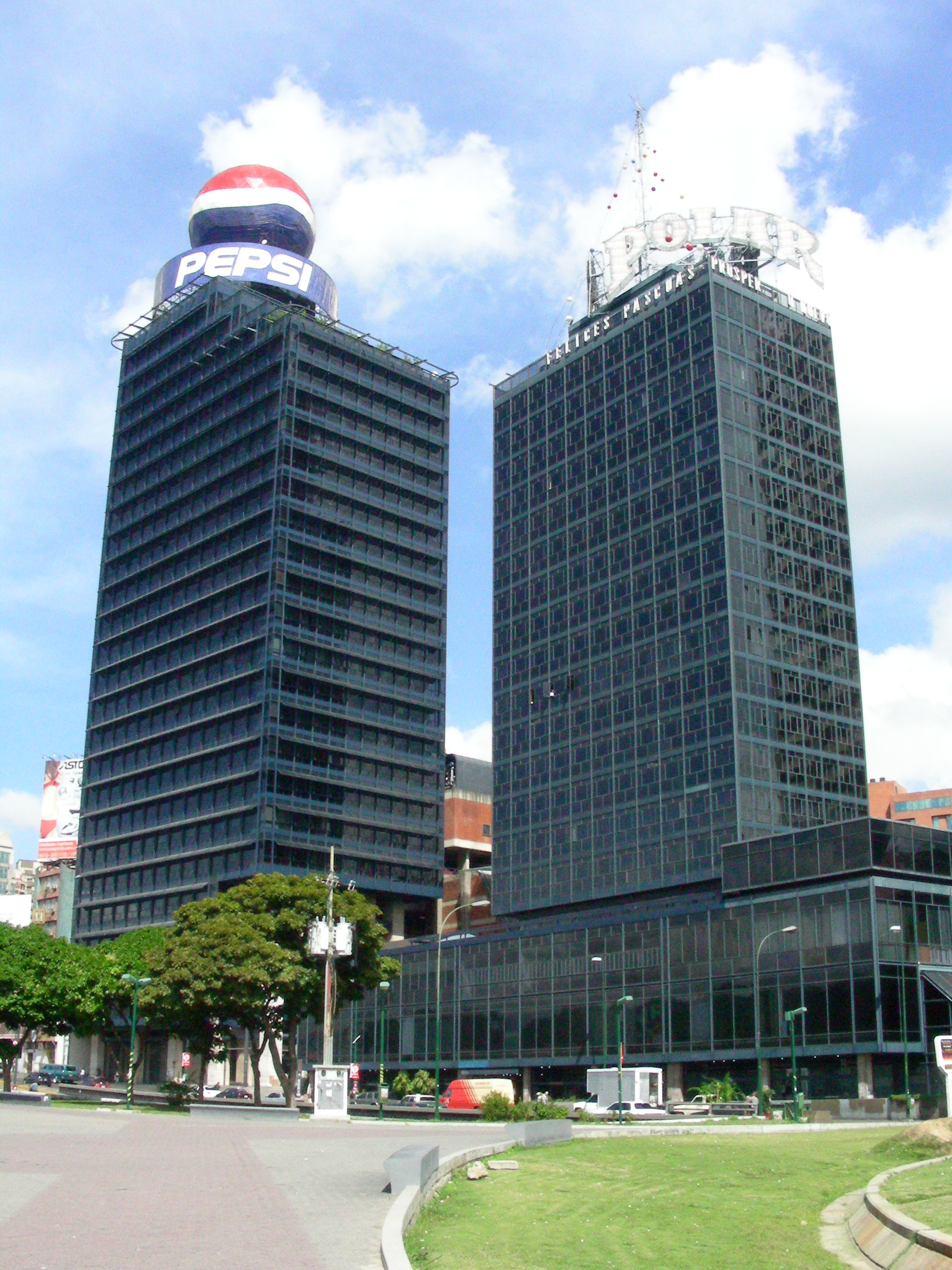
- Polar Towers in December 2007
- Interactive map of the Polar Towers area

General information
- Status: Completed
- Type: Office
- Location: Caracas, Venezuela
- Construction started: 1951 (East Tower); 1994 (West Tower)
- Completed: 1954; 72 years ago (East Tower); 1997; 29 years ago (West Tower)
- Owner: Empresas Polar C. A.

Height
- Roof: 86.9 m (285 ft) (East Tower); 121.9 m (400 ft) (West Tower)

Technical details
- Floor count: 17 (East Tower); 25 (West Tower)

Design and construction
- Architects: Martín Vegas Pacheco & Carlos Agell Architects

Polar Towers is a complex of two towers located in Plaza Venezuela, east of Caracas, Venezuela. It is the headquarters of Empresas Polar, and is formed by the east tower and the west tower.

== East tower ==
The east tower is 86 meters (282 ft) high and has 17 floors, covering a total area of 2,713 m^{2} (29,200 sq ft). Construction began in 1951 and ended in 1954 and is considered the first skyscraper built in Caracas for its innovative architecture.

== West tower ==
The west tower is 121 meters (397 ft) high and has 25 floors, covering a total area of 2,713 m^{2} (29,200 sq ft). Construction began in 1994 and ended in 1997, with an estimated cost of 2.5 billion old bolivars, equivalent to 2,500,000 Bs.F. It has 725 m^{2} (7,800 sq ft) of plants, parking for 575 vehicles, a convention center for 400 people, and a panoramic view of the Park Los Caobos and Botanical Garden.

The top of the west tower had advertising for Pepsi. In 2010 it was removed because its fragments were disintegrating after spending several years on the roof.
