= Provincial Tower =

- Centro Financiero Provincial
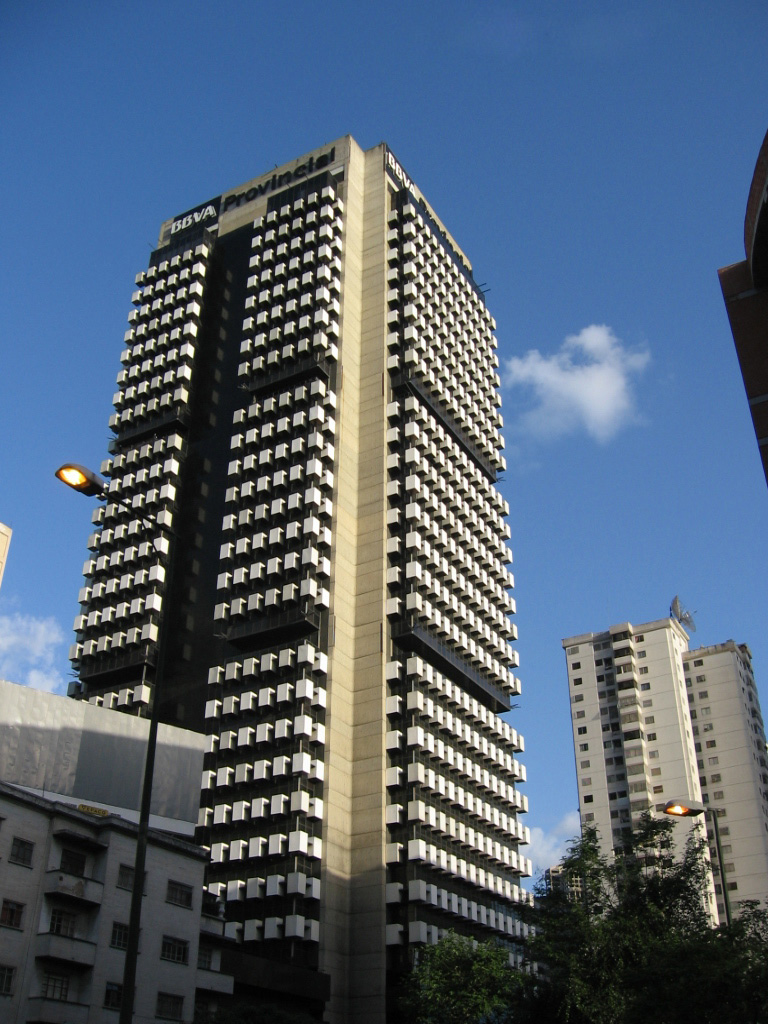
- Interactive map of the Provincial Tower area

General information
- Status: Completed
- Type: Office
- Location: Caracas, Venezuela
- Construction started: 1979
- Completed: 1984
- Owner: BBVA Banco Provincial C. A.

Height
- Roof: 159 m (522 ft)

Technical details
- Floor count: 40

The Provincial Tower (also known as Provincial Bank Tower, or BBVA Banco Provincial Tower) is a skyscraper located in the Venezuelan city of Caracas, stands out as the fifth-highest office tower in the city and Venezuela, was inaugurated in 1984, has 40 floors and is about 159 metres (522 ft) high, is located in the La Candelaria Parish, northwest of Libertador Municipality of Caracas.

This building does host a major private financial institutions operating in the country, the Provincial Bank which is controlled by the Spanish group Banco Bilbao Vizcaya or BBVA, hence after 1997 be called BBVA Provincial Bank Tower.

== See also ==
- List of tallest buildings in South America
