= List of Caracas Metro stations =

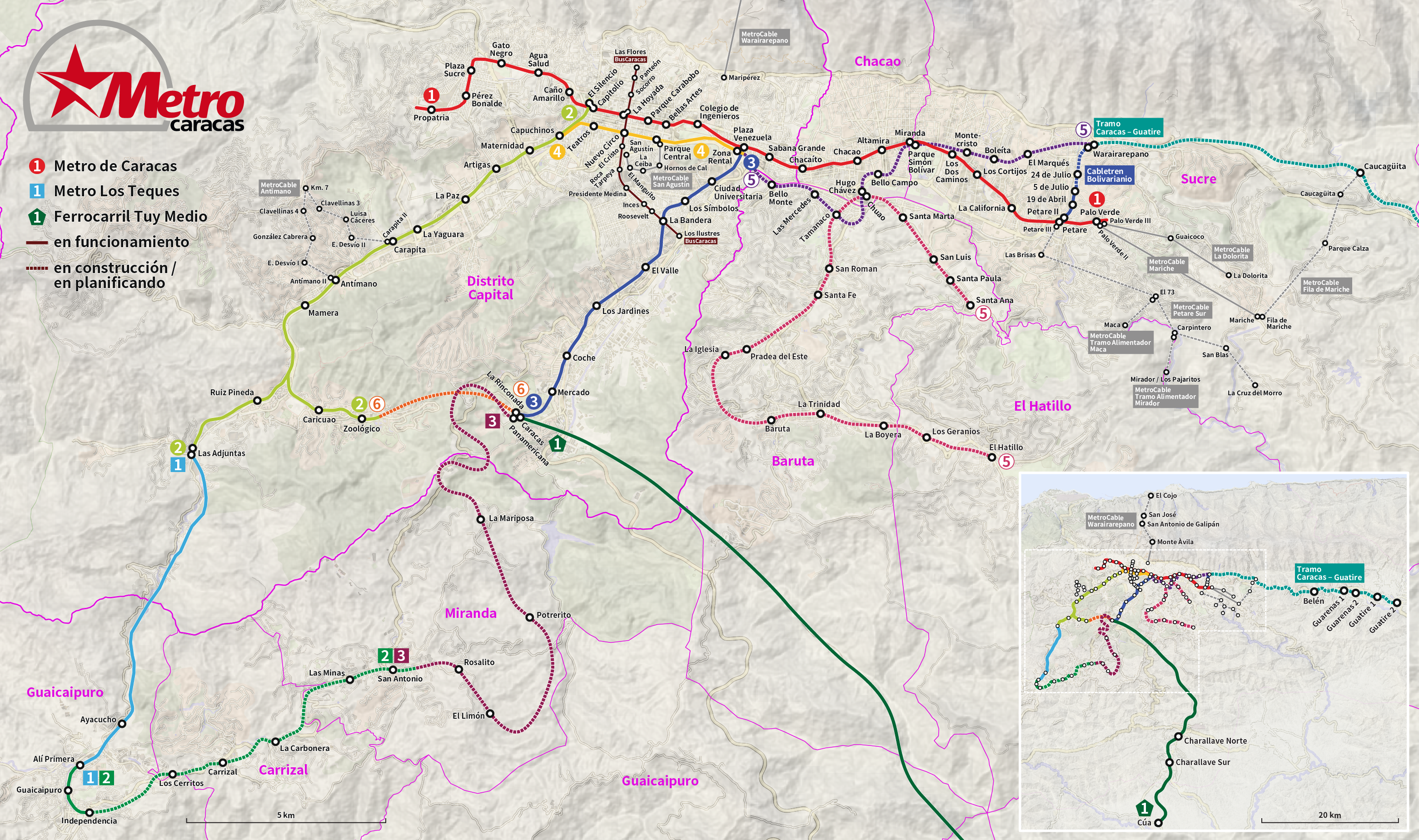
Map of the Caracas Metro, with current and future or under construction lines and stations (November 2016).

The Caracas Metro (referred as El Metro by locals) is a rapid transit system operating in Caracas, the capital of Venezuela. As of 2015, including Los Teques Metro, the Caracas Metro is made up of 52 stations.

Below is a list of the Caracas Metro lines and the stations that they serve.

== Line 1 (Red) ==
Line 1 of the Caracas Metro currently serves 22 stations, and has a route length of 20.4 kilometres (12.7 mi). Its initial section opened in 1983 as the city's first rapid transit line. It was extended thrice during the 1980s, reaching Palo Verde, current eastern terminus, in 1989.

- Propatria
- Pérez Bonalde
- Plaza Sucre
- Gato Negro
- Agua Salud
- Caño Amarillo
- Capitolio – transfer: Line 2 (via El Silencio)
- La Hoyada
- Parque Carabobo
- Bellas Artes
- Colegio de Ingenieros
- Plaza Venezuela – transfer: Line 3; Line 4 (via Zona Rental)
- Sabana Grande
- Chacaíto
- Chacao
- Altamira
- Miranda (formerly Parque del Este) – future point of transfer to Line 5
- Los Dos Caminos
- Los Cortijos
- La California
- Petare
- Palo Verde

== Line 2 (Green) ==
Line 2 operates on much of the same route that Line 4 does. From north-east to south-west its stations are:

- El Silencio – Point of transfer to Line 1
- Capuchinos – Point of transfer to Line 4
- Maternidad
- Artigas
- La Paz
- La Yaguara
- Carapita
- Antímano
- Mamera
- Caricuao
- Zoológico
- Ruiz Pineda
- Las Adjuntas – Transfer station for Los Teques Metro

== Line 3 (Blue) ==
Line 3 of the Caracas Metro currently serves 8 stations besides the interchange to Line 1, Plaza Venezuela, and has a route length of 10.4 kilometres (6.5 mi). It started revenue service between Plaza Venezuela and El Valle in 1994; it was later extended to La Rinconada in 2006, but this section did not become fully operational until 2010, with the opening of the three intermediate stations.

- Plaza Venezuela – transfer: Line 1; Line 4 (via Zona Rental)
- Ciudad Universitaria
- Los Símbolos
- La Bandera
- El Valle
- Los Jardines
- Coche
- Mercado
- La Rinconada – transfer: IFE railway station

== Line 4 (Yellow) ==
Line 4 operates on much of the same route that Line 2 does.

From east to west:

- Zona Rental – Point of transfer with Line 1 and Line 3
- Parque Central
- Nuevo Circo
- Teatros
- Capuchinos – Point of transfer to Line 2

== Line 5 (Purple) ==
This line is still under construction.

First phase – from west to east:

- Bello Monte
- Las Mercedes
- Tamanaco – Future point of transfer to Line 5
- Chuao
- Bello Campo
- Miranda/Hugo Chávez (formerly: Parque del Este II) – Point of transfer to Line 1

The following stations found in the City of Caracas are under construction, as part of the project known as the Guarenas / Guatire Metro:

- Miranda/Hugo Chávez (formerly: Parque del Este II) – Point of transfer to Line 1
- Montecristo
- Boleíta
- El Marqués
- Warairarepano – Point of transfer to the Guarenas / Guatire (light rail) line

== Line 6 (Orange) ==
Most of this line is still in planning. It will connect Line 2 and Line 3.

== Los Teques Metro (Cyan) ==
- Las Adjuntas – transfer station to Caracas Metro Line 2
- Alí Primera (formerly: El Tambor)
- Guaicaipuro
- Independencia
- Los Cerritos
- Carrizal
- Las Minas
- San Antonio

== Guarenas / Guatire (Teal) ==
This is a light rail line. The following stations are under construction, as part of the project known as the Guarenas / Guatire Metro:

- Warairarepano – Point of transfer to line Line 5 and the Cabletren of Petare
- Caucagüita
- Belén
- Guarenas I
- Guarenas II
- Guatire I
- Guatire II
