= Maternidad station =

Caracas metro station

Maternidad
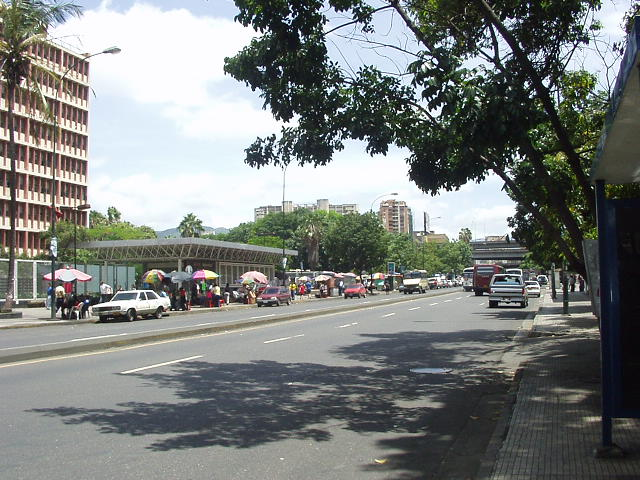
- Station in 2004

General information
- Location: San Juan parish, Municipio; Libertador, Capital District; Venezuela
- Coordinates: 10°29′42.1″N 66°55′59.7″W
- System: Caracas Metro rapid transit station
- Operator: C.A. Metro de Caracas
- Line: Line 2
- Platforms: 1 island platform
- Tracks: 2

Construction
- Structure type: underground

History
- Opened: 6 November 1988

Services
Preceding station	Caracas Metro	Following station
Capuchinos toward El Silencio	Line 2	Artigas toward Zoológico or Las Adjuntas
Location

Maternidad is a Caracas Metro station on Line 2. It was opened on 6 November 1988 as part of the extension of the line from La Paz to El Silencio. The station is between Capuchinos and Artigas.
