= Caricuao =

Caricuao Municipality Municipio Chacao
- Municipality
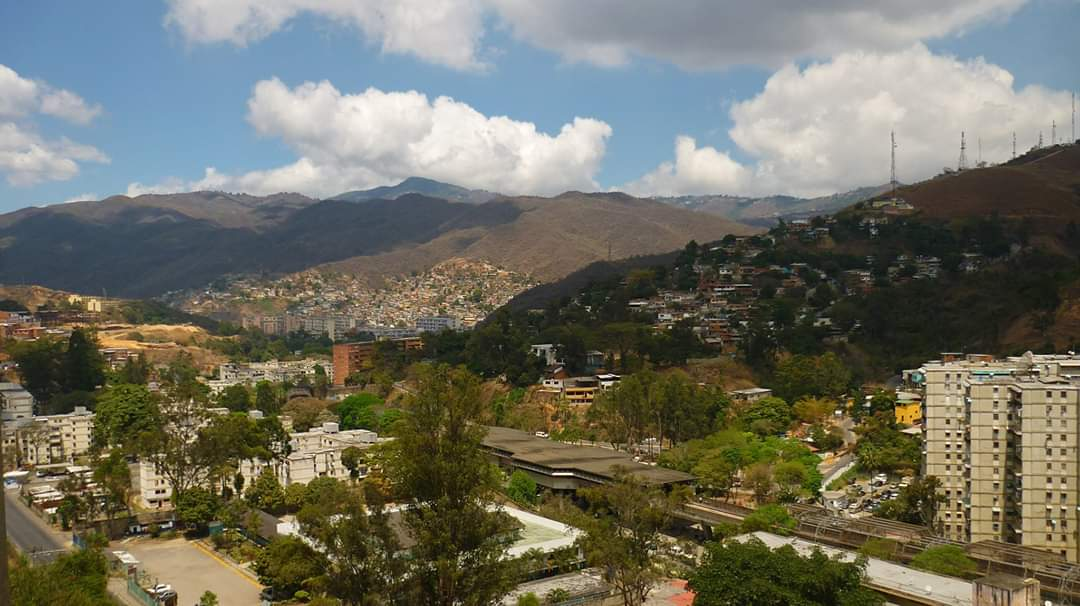
- Buildings in Chacao

- Location in Miranda

- Location in Venezuela
- Coordinates: 10°26′N 66°59′W
- Country: Venezuela
- State: Miranda
- Municipality: Libertador municipality
- Time zone: UTC−4 (VET)
- Area code(s): 0234

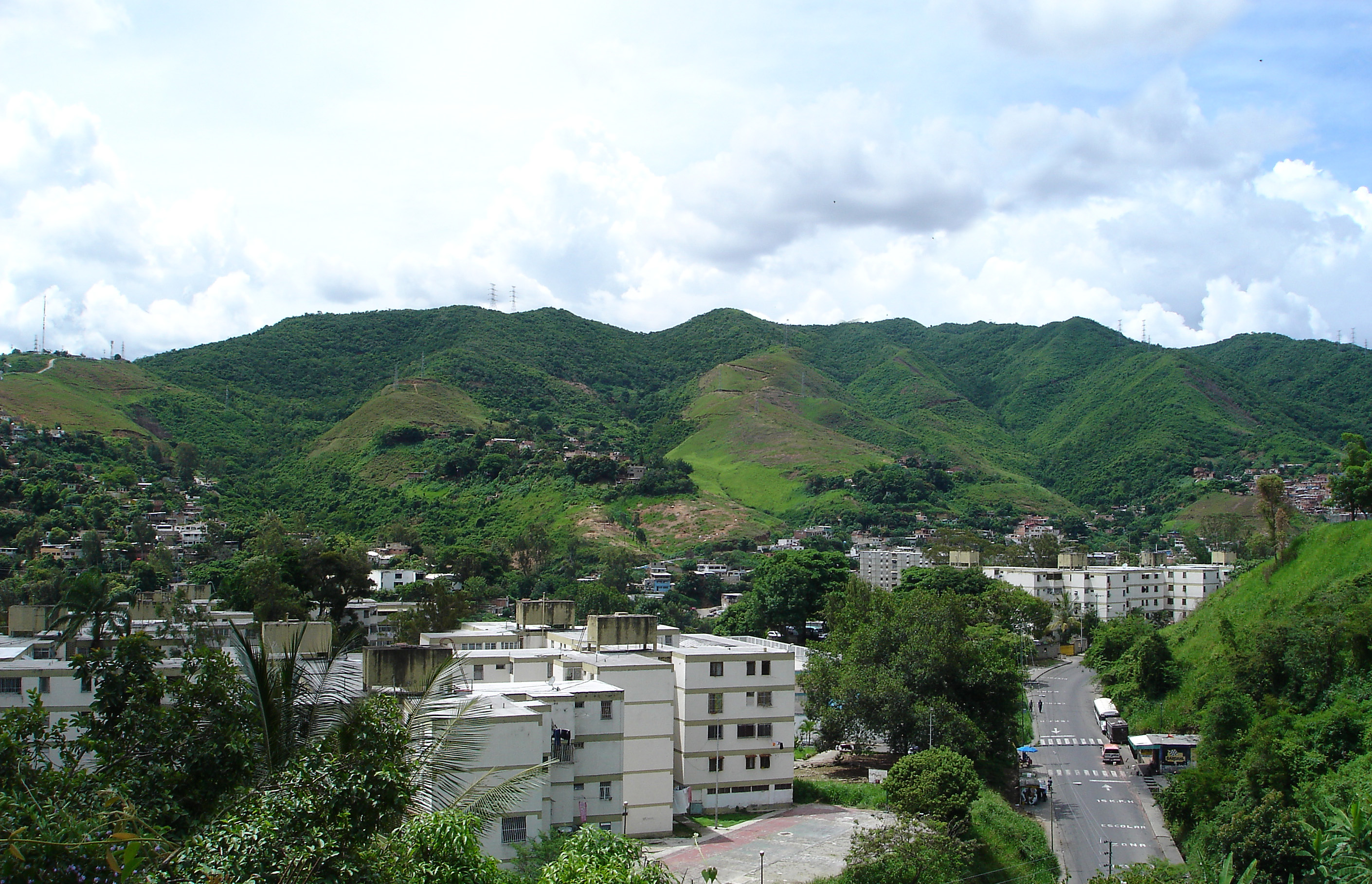
A view of Caricuao

Caricuao (Spanish pronunciation: [kaɾiˈkwao]) is a district of Caracas, Venezuela. It is part of Libertador municipality.

It is named after a powerful indigenous chief of the Caracas tribe, who fought bravely against the Spaniard Conquistadores; he and Tiuna chief were the first indigenous leaders to set up "armies" on their tribes to organize the battles against their enemies, the Spanish, to which they inflicted great losses as the native indigenous tribes were fighting the Spanish settlement.

Caricuao is known as the second vegetal reserve of Caracas. The most important public zoo of the capital, the Parque Zoológico Caricuao, is located there.

Since its foundation in 1961 it has had a strong cultural movement especially in the music, the first rocksteady, reggae and ska bands of Venezuela were born in this neighborhood, for this it is also known as "The Independent Republic of Reggae and Ska". From Caricuao broadcasts "Radio Perola", one of the most emblematic independent community radio stations in the nation.

Since it is a large neighborhood, it is possible to get there on several Caracas Metro stations on Line 2 (the green one) such as Caricuao, Ruiz Pineda, and Zoológico. A new subway line opened in October 2006 to connect Las Adjuntas, a neighboring suburb, and Caracas to Los Teques, capital city of Miranda State and an important pole of development.
