= Antímano =

District of Caracas, Venezuela

Coordinates: 10°28′N 66°58′W

Antímano's location in Caracas

Antímano is a district of Caracas, Venezuela. It is part of Libertador municipality. According to a 2007 estimate of the National Institute of Statistics of Venezuela, it had a population of 150,971 people in 2007.

== History ==
The name Antímano derives from a combination of the words Atamanona and Amatima, the names of two indigenous groups which lived in the area before the Spanish Conquest. Antímano was established in 1621 as an agricultural village, and remained rural until the first part of the twentieth century. Towards the end of the nineteenth century the Venezuelan President Antonio Guzmán Blanco built a country house in Antímano, calling it "La Pequeña Versalles" (Little Versailles). From the mid-1940s Antímano began to develop as an industrial zone, with the first factories producing Polar beer and Pepsi. The steel company Sidetur was founded here in 1948.

The house of Guzman Blanco fell into disuse for over 30 years (despite being declared a National Monument) and was eventually restored in 2004, the building being turned into a Sociocultural Complex, and its grounds converted into a sports facility with baseball, football and basketball fields.

Since it is a large neighborhood, it is possible to get there on a number of Caracas Metro stations on Line 2 (the green one) including Antímano, Carapita, and Mamera.
