= Mamera station =

Caracas metro station

Mamera
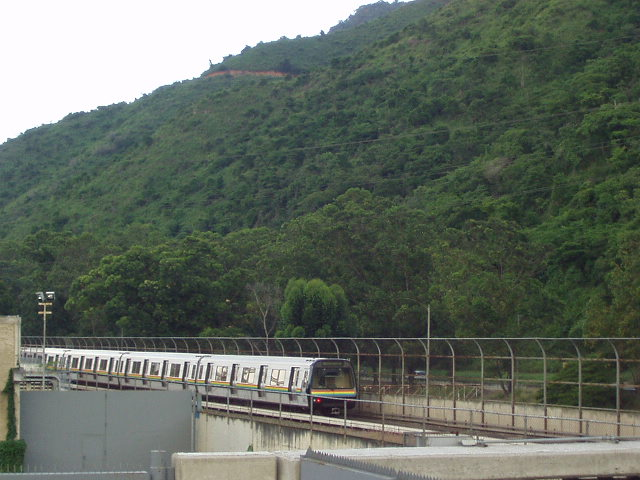
- Train approaching the station

General information
- Location: Antímano parish, Municipio; Libertador, Capital District; Venezuela
- Coordinates: 10°27′32.6″N 66°59′11.8″W
- System: Caracas Metro rapid transit station
- Operator: C.A. Metro de Caracas
- Line: Line 2
- Platforms: 2 side platforms
- Tracks: 2

Construction
- Structure type: at grade

History
- Opened: 4 October 1987

Services
| Preceding station | Caracas Metro | Following station |
|---|---|---|
| Antímano toward El Silencio | Line 2 | Caricuao toward Zoológico |
| Antímano toward El Silencio | Line 2 | Ruiz Pineda toward Las Adjuntas |
Location

Mamera is a Caracas Metro station on Line 2. It was opened on 4 October 1987 as part of the inaugural section of Line 2 from La Paz to Las Adjuntas and Zoológico. Here, the line branches into two. The previous station is Antímano, the next station in the direction Zoológico is Caricuao, the next station in the direction Las Adjuntas is Ruiz Pineda.
