= Ciudad Universitaria station (Caracas) =

Caracas metro station

Ciudad Universitaria
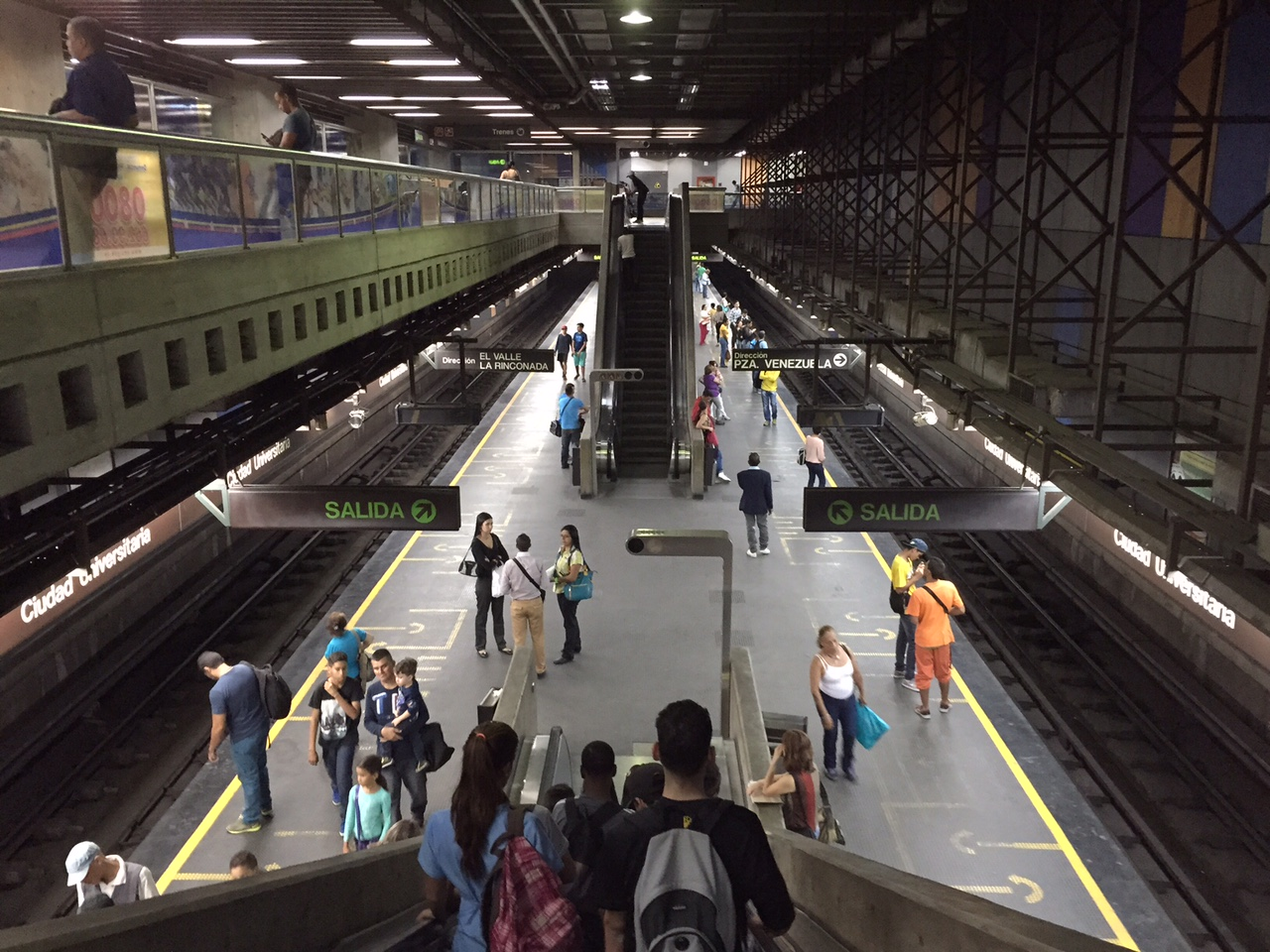
- Descending to the platform level

General information
- Location: Paseo Los Ilustres / Plaza Las Tres Gracias / University City of Caracas, Los Chaguaramos; San Pedro parish, Municipio Libertador, Capital District; Venezuela
- Coordinates: 10°29′17″N 66°53′21″W
- System: Caracas Metro rapid transit station
- Operator: C.A. Metro de Caracas
- Platforms: 1 island platform
- Tracks: 2
- Connections: Metrobús: 921

Construction
- Structure type: underground
- Accessible: Escalator available

Other information
- Station code: UCV

History
- Opened: 18 December 1994

Services
Preceding station	Caracas Metro	Following station
Plaza Venezuela Terminus	Line 3	Los Símbolos toward La Rinconada
Location

Ciudad Universitaria is a Caracas Metro station on Line 3. It was opened on 18 December 1994 as part of the inaugural section of Line 3 from Plaza Venezuela to El Valle. The station is between Plaza Venezuela and Los Símbolos.

The station serves the University City of Caracas and surrounding neighborhood on the south side of the campus. It is often used to access sporting, educational, cultural and entertainment events that take place at the University City, and for visiting the Olympic Stadium, the Aula Magna or the University Stadium.

== Structure ==
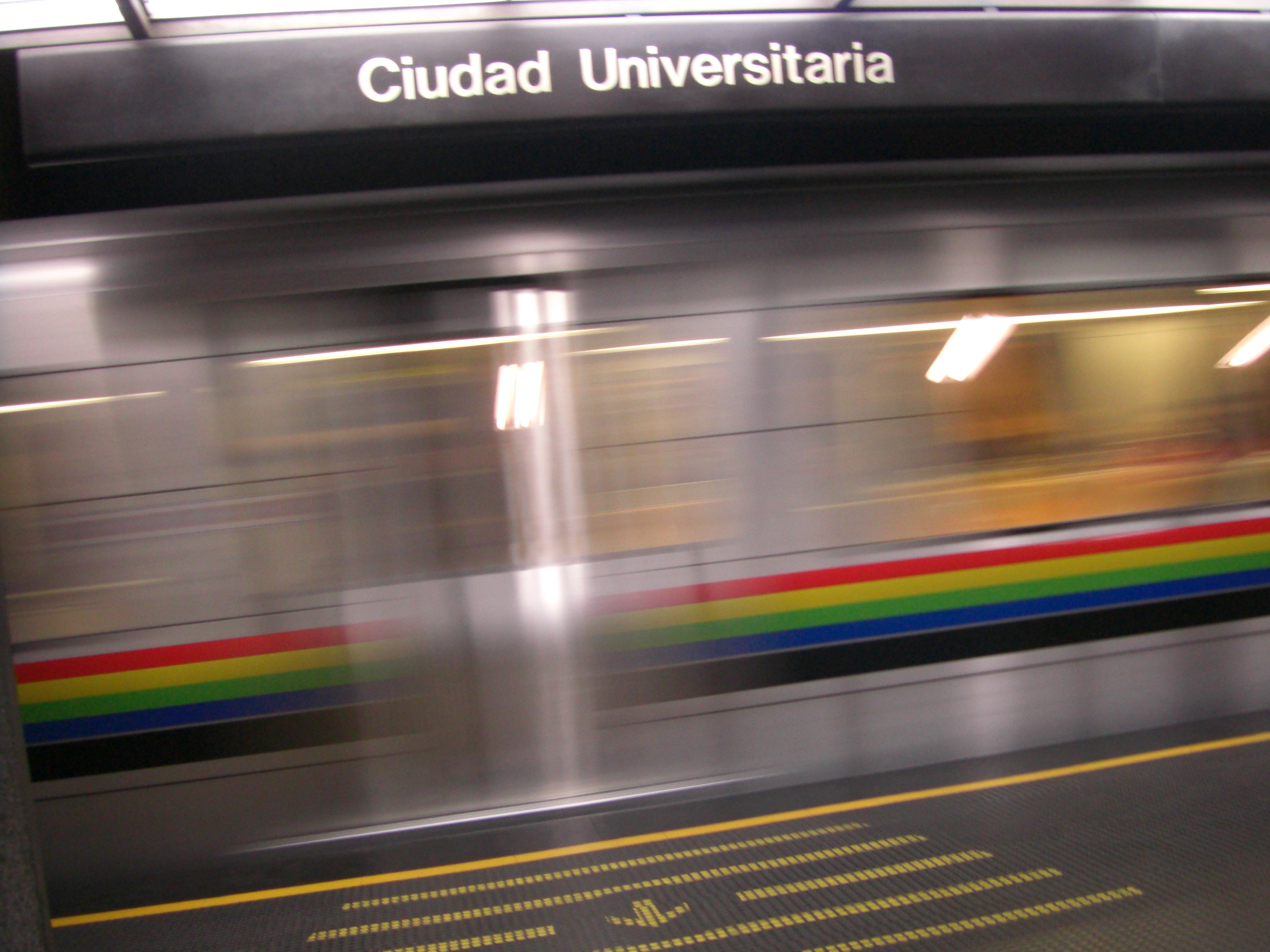
A train with the distinct rainbow of Caracas public transport passes the station

The station has two tracks, which operate the extended line 3 of the Caracas Metro, and four exits. Two exits face the campus of UCV, one faces a nearby plaza (Plaza Las Tres Gracias), and one faces a main public avenue (Los Ilustres).

== Incidents ==
There have been several incidents and cause for closure at the station. For example, a deterioration of technology. In 2016, the station was closed whilst operational facilities were restored.

The station was briefly closed on different occasions during student protests in 2017. During a series of local protests in Plaza Las Tres Gracias and Plaza Venezuela, the station and surrounding roads were closed in January 2018. In February 2018 it was evacuated, which Venezuelan media reported as a preventative action.

Overcrowding on the metro has also caused incidents at the station, including in August 2018 when a child became trapped in the closing doors of a train, which wasn't stopped until after entering a tunnel that the girl's body was smashed against the wall to. The occupants of the train were taken off, with the line closed to allow them to walk to the UCV station.

In the morning of 25 July 2019, the station was closed for two hours. It was revealed that the station and another one closed that morning, Palo Verde, experienced electrical failures and were closed to allow engineers to fix the problem.
