= Antímano station =

Caracas metro station

Antímano
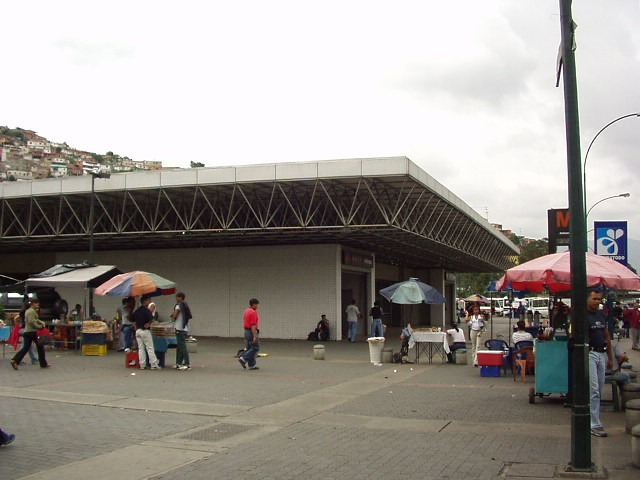
- The station building

General information
- Location: Antímano parish, Municipio; Libertador, Capital District; Venezuela
- Coordinates: 10°27′56.1″N 66°58′43.2″W
- System: Caracas Metro rapid transit station
- Operator: C.A. Metro de Caracas
- Line: Line 2
- Platforms: 2 side platforms
- Tracks: 2

Construction
- Structure type: underground

History
- Opened: 4 October 1987

Services
Preceding station	Caracas Metro	Following station
Carapita toward El Silencio	Line 2	Mamera toward Zoológico or Las Adjuntas
Location

Antímano is a Caracas Metro station on Line 2. It was opened on 4 October 1987 as part of the inaugural section of Line 2 from La Paz to Las Adjuntas and Zoológico. The station is between Carapita and Mamera.
