= Artigas station =

Caracas metro station

Artigas
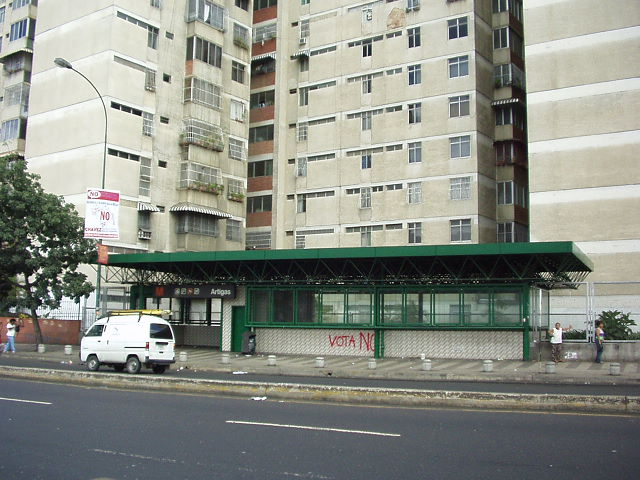
- Access to the station on Avenida San Martín

General information
- Location: San Juan and El Paraíso parishes, Municipio Libertador, Capital District; Venezuela
- Coordinates: 10°29′28.1″N 66°56′26.2″W
- System: Caracas Metro rapid transit station
- Operator: C.A. Metro de Caracas
- Line: Line 2
- Platforms: 1 island platform
- Tracks: 2

Construction
- Structure type: underground

History
- Opened: 6 November 1988

Services
Preceding station	Caracas Metro	Following station
Maternidad toward El Silencio	Line 2	La Paz toward Zoológico or Las Adjuntas
Location

Artigas is a Caracas Metro station on Line 2. It was opened on 6 November 1988 as part of the extension of the line from La Paz to El Silencio. The station is between Maternidad and La Paz.
