= Los Símbolos station =

Caracas metro station

Los Símbolos
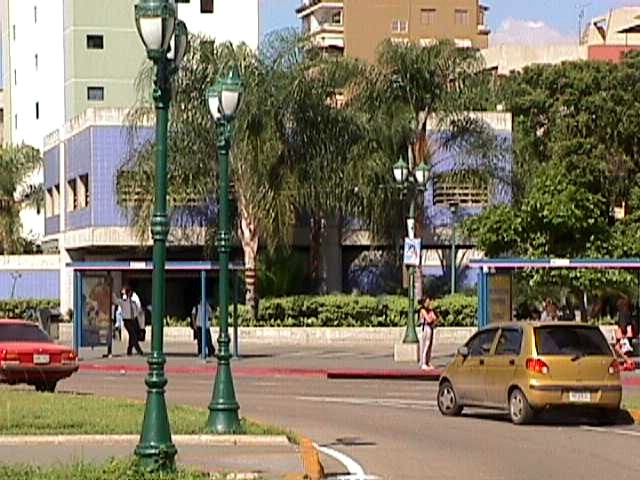
- View of the station

General information
- Location: San Pedro parish, Municipio; Libertador, Capital District; Venezuela
- Coordinates: 10°28′57.9″N 66°53′46.7″W
- System: Caracas Metro rapid transit station
- Operator: C.A. Metro de Caracas
- Line: Line 3
- Platforms: 1 island platform
- Tracks: 2

Construction
- Structure type: underground

History
- Opened: 18 December 1994

Services
Preceding station	Caracas Metro	Following station
Ciudad Universitaria toward Plaza Venezuela	Line 3	La Bandera toward La Rinconada
Location

Los Símbolos is a Caracas Metro station on Line 3. It was opened on 18 December 1994 as part of the inaugural section of Line 3 from Plaza Venezuela to El Valle. The station is between Ciudad Universitaria and La Bandera.
