= Ruiz Pineda station =

Caracas metro station

Ruiz Pineda
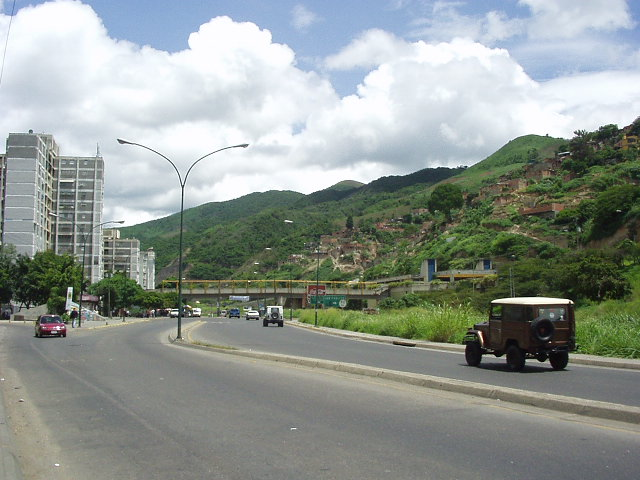
- Station in 2004

General information
- Location: Venezuela
- Coordinates: 10°25′13.6″N 66°59′49.9″W
- System: Caracas Metro station
- Operator: C.A. Metro de Caracas
- Line: Line 2
- Platforms: 2 side platforms
- Tracks: 2

History
- Opened: 4 October 1987

Services
Preceding station	Caracas Metro	Following station
Mamera toward El Silencio	Line 2	Las Adjuntas Terminus
Location

Ruiz Pineda is a Caracas Metro station on Line 2. It was opened on October 4th 1987 as part of the inaugural section of Line 2 from La Paz to Las Adjuntas and Zoológico, on the branch leading to Las Adjuntas. The station is between Mamera and Las Adjuntas.
