= Coche station =

Caracas metro station

Coche
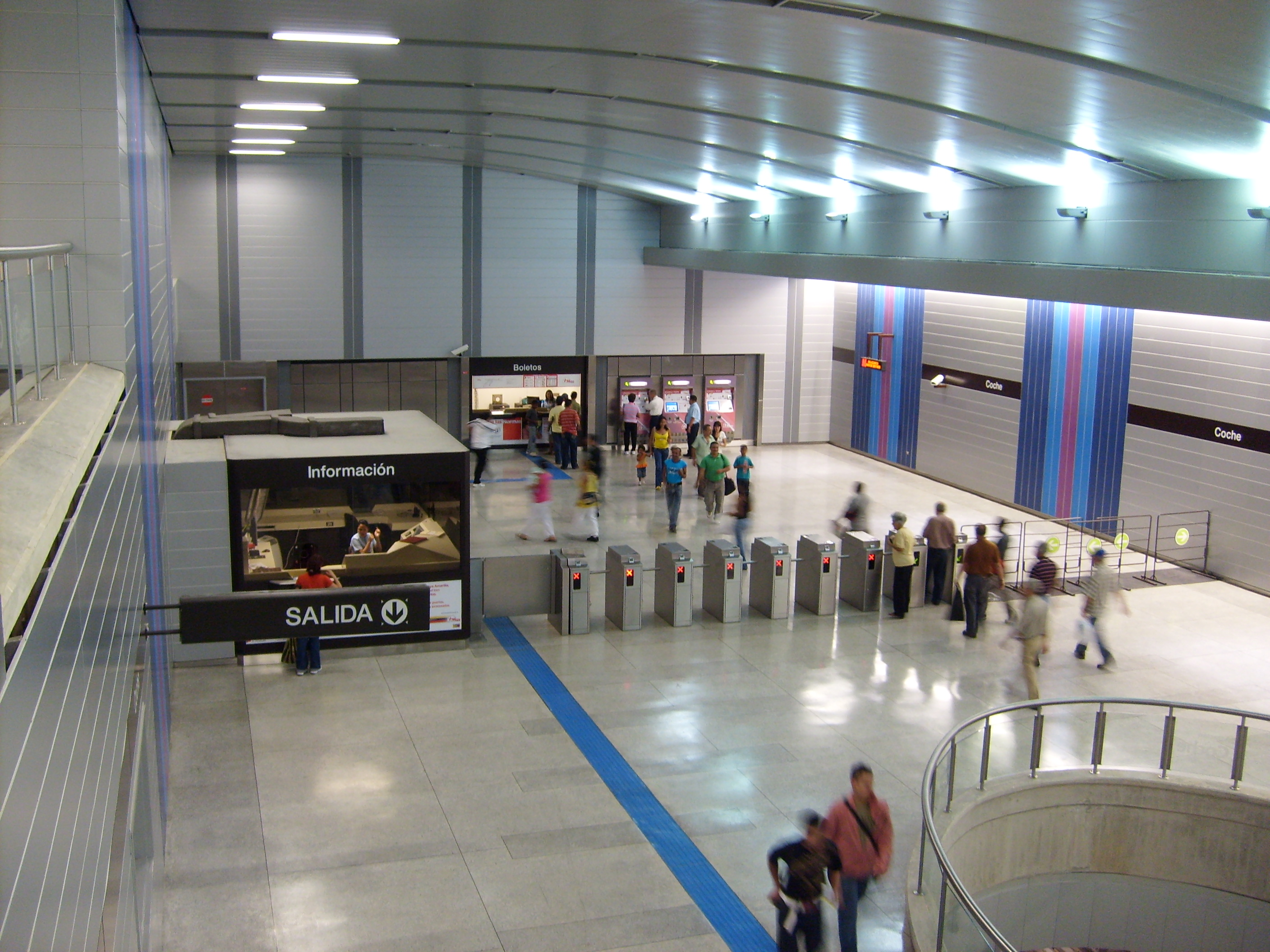

General information
- Location: Venezuela
- Coordinates: 10°26′51.4″N 66°55′26.1″W
- System: Caracas Metro station
- Line: Line 3

History
- Opened: 9 January 2010

Services
Preceding station	Caracas Metro	Following station
Los Jardines toward Plaza Venezuela	Line 3	Mercado toward La Rinconada
Location

Coche is a Caracas Metro station on Line 3. It was opened on 9 January 2010 on the section of the line between El Valle and La Rinconada, which was opened earlier without intermediate stations. The station is located between Los Jardines and Mercado.
