= Caricuao station =

Caracas metro station

Caricuao
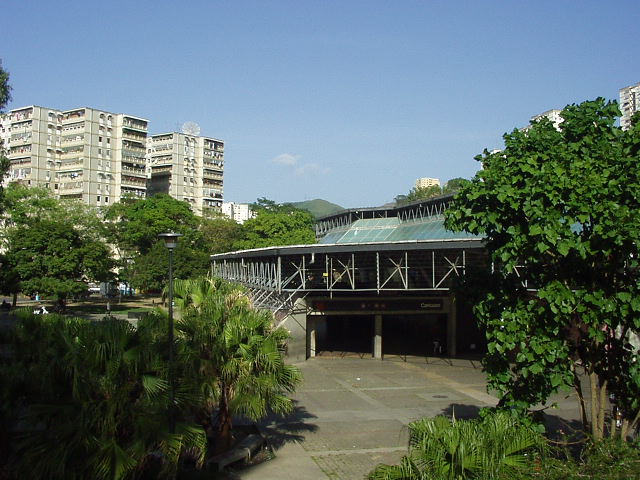
- Station in 2004

General information
- Location: Venezuela
- Coordinates: 10°26′05.1″N 66°58′52.6″W
- System: Caracas Metro station
- Operator: C.A. Metro de Caracas
- Line: Line 2
- Platforms: 2 side platforms
- Tracks: 2

History
- Opened: 4 October 1987

Services
Preceding station	Caracas Metro	Following station
Mamera toward El Silencio	Line 2	Zoológico Terminus
Location

Caricuao is a Caracas Metro station on Line 2. It was opened on 4 October 1987 as part of the inaugural section of Line 2 from La Paz to Las Adjuntas and Zoológico, on the branch leading to Zoológico. The station is between Mamera and Zoológico.

The station is located in the district of Caricuao, hence the name.
