= Carapita station =

Caracas metro station

Carapita

General information
- Location: Antímano parish, Municipio; Libertador, Capital District; Venezuela
- Coordinates: 10°28′14.7″N 66°58′15.7″W
- System: Caracas Metro rapid transit station
- Operator: C.A. Metro de Caracas
- Line: Line 2
- Platforms: 2 side platforms
- Tracks: 2

Construction
- Structure type: underground

History
- Opened: 4 October 1987

Services
| Preceding station | Caracas Metro | Following station |
|---|---|---|
| La Yaguara toward El Silencio | Line 2 | Antímano toward Zoológico or Las Adjuntas |
Location

Carapita is a Caracas Metro station on Line 2. It was opened on 4 October 1987 as part of the inaugural section of Line 2 from La Paz to Las Adjuntas and Zoológico. The station is between La Yaguara and Antímano.
