= La Bandera station =

Caracas metro station

La Bandera
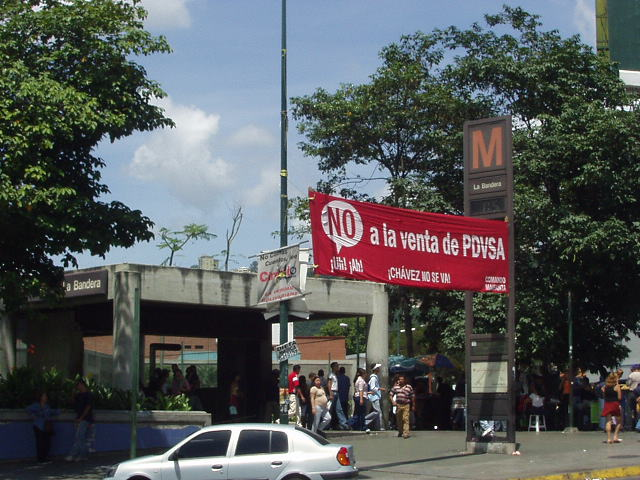

General information
- Location: Venezuela
- Coordinates: 10°28′43.3″N 66°54′05.4″W
- System: Caracas Metro station
- Line: Line 3

History
- Opened: 18 December 1994

Services
Preceding station	Caracas Metro	Following station
Los Símbolos toward Plaza Venezuela	Line 3	El Valle toward La Rinconada
Location

La Bandera is a Caracas Metro station on Line 3. It was opened on 18 December 1994 as part of the inaugural section of Line 3 from Plaza Venezuela to El Valle. The station is between Los Símbolos and El Valle.
