= Nuevo Circo station =

Caracas metro station

Nuevo Circo
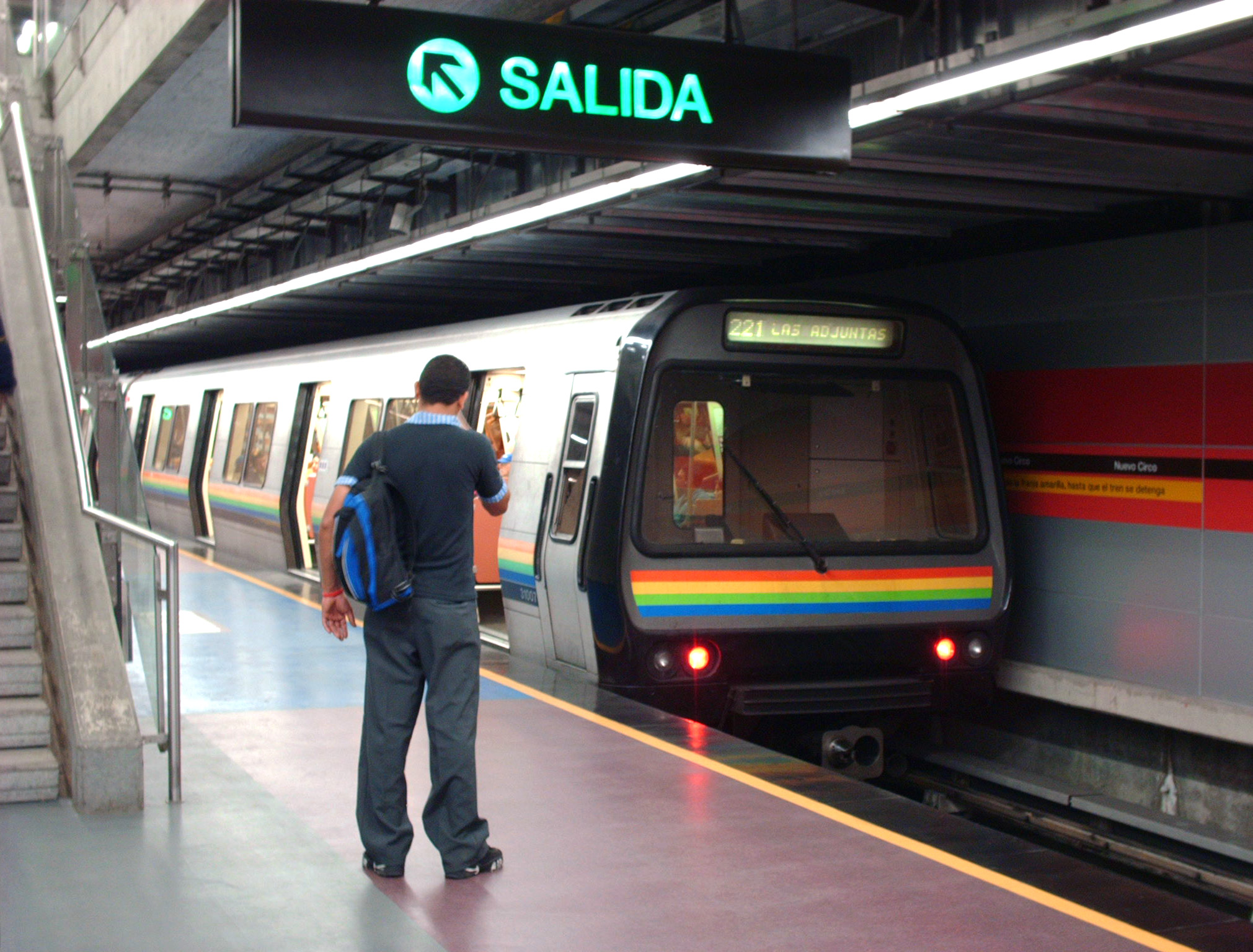

General information
- Location: Venezuela
- Coordinates: 10°30′00.6″N 66°54′31.5″W
- System: Caracas Metro station
- Line: Line 4

History
- Opened: 19 July 2006

Services
Preceding station	Caracas Metro	Following station
Teatros toward Capuchinos	Line 4	Parque Central toward Zona Rental
Location

Nuevo Circo is a Caracas Metro station on Line 4. It was opened on 19 July 2006 as part of the inaugural section of the line between Capuchinos and Zona Rental. The station is located between Teatros and Parque Central.
