= Mercado station =

Caracas metro station

Mercado
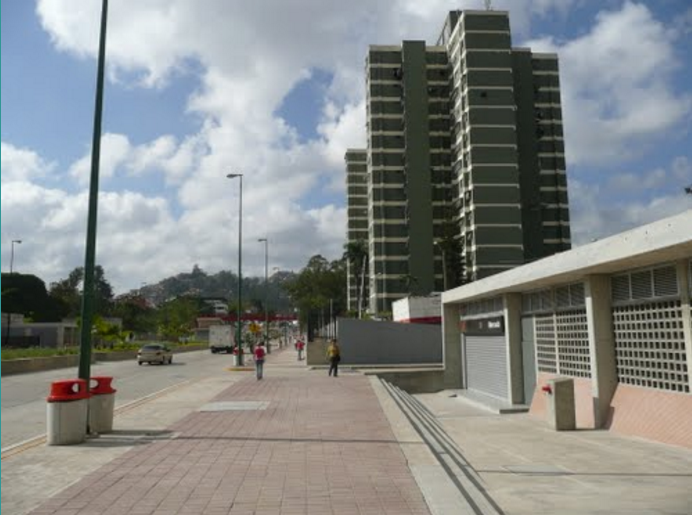
- Station in 2016

General information
- Location: Venezuela
- Coordinates: 10°26′22.9″N 66°55′36.6″W
- System: Caracas Metro station
- Operator: C.A. Metro de Caracas
- Line: Line 3
- Platforms: 1 island platform
- Tracks: 2

Construction
- Structure type: underground

History
- Opened: 9 January 2010

Services
Preceding station	Caracas Metro	Following station
Coche toward Plaza Venezuela	Line 3	La Rinconada Terminus
Location

Mercado is a Caracas Metro station on Line 3. It was opened on 9 January 2010 on the section of the line between El Valle and La Rinconada, which started operations earlier without intermediate stations. The station is located between Coche and La Rinconada.
