= Los Jardines station (Caracas) =

Metro station in Caracas, Venezuela

Los Jardines
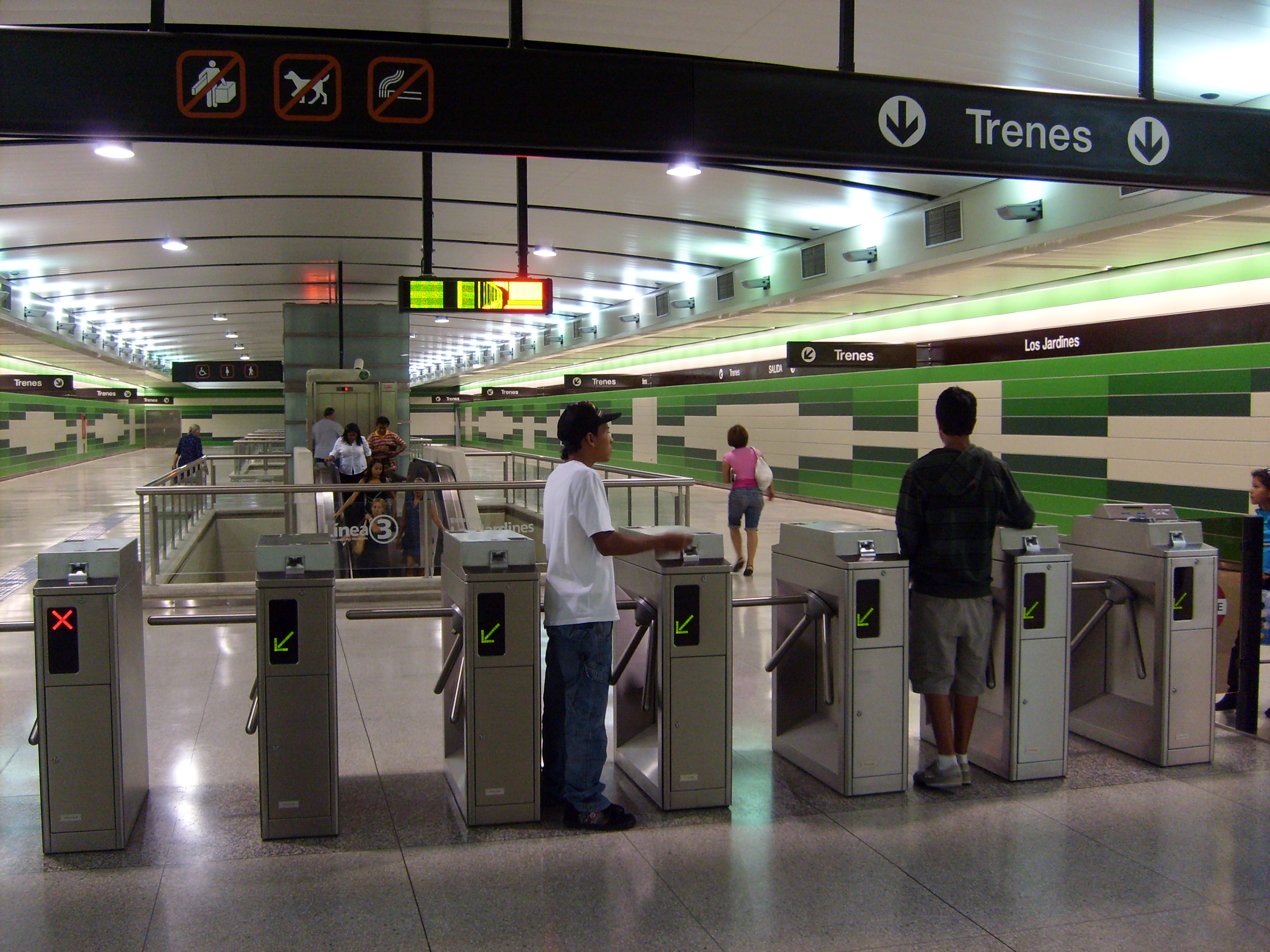

General information
- Location: Venezuela
- Coordinates: 10°27′33.4″N 66°54′59.7″W
- System: Caracas Metro station
- Line: Line 3

History
- Opened: 9 January 2010

Services
Preceding station	Caracas Metro	Following station
El Valle toward Plaza Venezuela	Line 3	Coche toward La Rinconada
Location

Los Jardines is a Caracas Metro station on Line 3. It was opened on 9 January 2010 on the section of the line between El Valle and La Rinconada, which was opened earlier without intermediate stations. The station is located between El Valle and Coche.
