= José González-Lander =

Venezuelan engineer (1933–2000)

- José González-Lander in 1987
- Born: November 13, 1933; Caracas, Venezuela
- Died: January 18, 2000 (aged 66); Caracas, Venezuela

Jose Gonzalez-Lander (November 13, 1933 – January 18, 2000) was a Caracas, Venezuela born engineer credited for leading the planning, design and construction of the Caracas Metro during an uninterrupted period of more than thirty years, from 1966 to 1997.

== Early life ==
José Octaviano González Lander was born in the La Pastora neighborhood of Caracas to Octaviano González Benatuil (1901–1948) an accountant and Josefina Lander Fernández (1902–1994). Josefina was first cousin to First Lady Menca de Leoni, wife to President Raúl Leoni. Gonzalez-Lander had a younger brother, Alfredo, an attorney, and a younger sister María Josefina. In January 1948, his father died of a stroke when he was 14 years old. He attended the Escuela Experimental Venezuela (elementary) and the Liceo Andrés Bello (secondary school) graduating in 1950.

== Civil Service ==
Mr. Gonzalez-Lander dedicated his life to public service rising through the ranks of the Ministry of Public Works where he started as an assistant engineer when he was in his freshman year in engineering school. He graduated in 1958 with a degree in Civil Engineering from Universidad Central de Venezuela in Caracas. His graduation was delayed almost two years due to student unrest during the final years of General Marcos Pérez Jiménez' dictatorship. The Venezuelan government granted him a scholarship to attend graduate school at the Massachusetts Institute of Technology where he concentrated in Transportation Engineering and Economics.

On his return to Venezuela Mr. Gonzalez-Lander was put in charge of the Ministry of Public Works' Office of Transportation Planning where he spearheaded the design of the backbone of the future Caracas Metro system, a 20 km underground double track rail line connecting the East and West ends of the city. This effort would expand for 10 years before the project could muster enough public support for its construction. Between 1974 and 1977, at the beginning of the first administration of President Carlos Andres Pérez, he served in a Vice Minister role as General Director of Roadways.

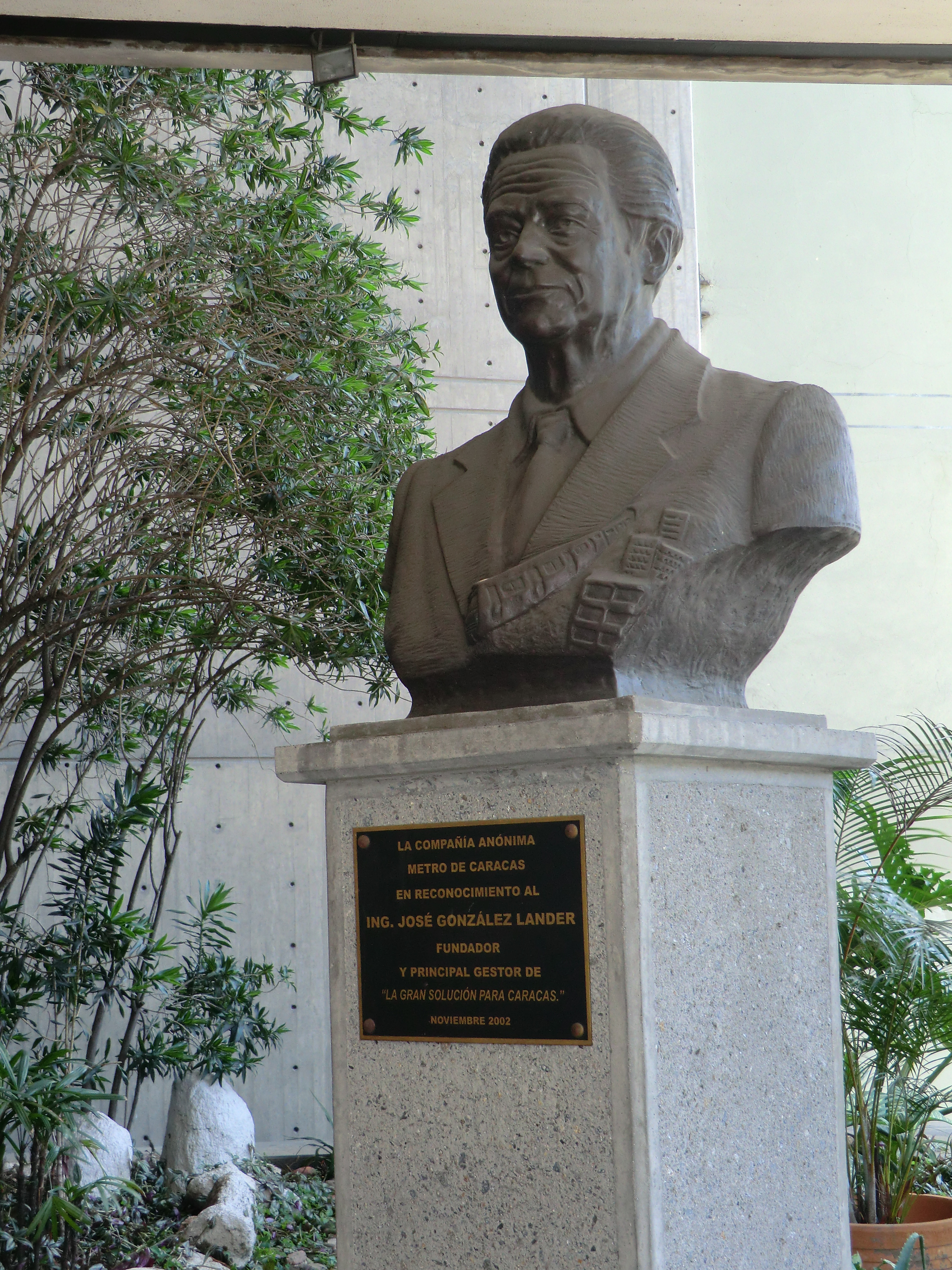
José González Lander bust at the entrance of the "Jose Gonzalez-Lander" building near the Caracas Metro La Hoyada Station.

Caracas' rapid growth as a result of the oil boom of the 1970s strained the capacity of the city's road network and the need for a rapid transit system became evident as automotive traffic along its modern expressways became chaotic. The government of President Pérez decided to provide full political and financial support to the construction of this complex project. The man selected to head this effort was Jose Gonzalez-Lander who, in 1977, founded the Compañía Anónima Metro de Caracas, an independent government enterprise that would plan and execute the construction of the system and would operate it once completed (similar to an American Transit Authority.)

This was one of the most ambitious infrastructure projects undertaken in the country since the Guri Dam was started in the 1960s. Construction of the first phase was very successful and revenue service started on January 2, 1983. The success of the project was in large measure attributed to Mr. Gonzalez-Lander's and his team's technical and managerial skills. In a country where most public endeavors are stifled by poor management and charges of corruption, the Caracas Metro and Mr. Gonzalez-Lander became an example to follow.

During his 20 years at the helm of the company, Gonzalez Lander oversaw the construction of the first line and of two branches (see List of Caracas Metro stations.) The last rail line completed under his management was opened to revenue service in 1994 (Line No. 3); he also oversaw the increase of the rail car fleet for Lines 1 and 2. The success of the company continued during the operation of the system with the creation of Metrobus, a network of feeder buses which replicated the efficiency of the underground service and gained the praise of all its users. This became the only centrally controlled network of high capacity buses in the city where, up to that point, surface transportation was provided by driver-owned jitneys. During his tenure the company also laid the foundation for the future growth of the system establishing an expansion program for the year 2010 that included two additional Metro corridors and two extensions of existing lines.

Mr. Gonzalez-Lander retired in 1997 and received the honorary title of President Emeritus of the company he founded.

== International ==
Mr. González-Lander traveled extensively heading Venezuela's delegations in multiple international organizations specialized in public transportation and urban development. Between 1974 and 1979 he presided the executive committee of the Pan-American Highway Congress. In October 1980, Gonzalez-Lander was invited by Eno Center for Transportation to participate in a panel to review the Transportation Systems in the Americas. The Caracas Metro, under his leadership, helped create the Latin American Association of Metros and Undergrounds (ALAMYS) which had its first conference in Caracas in 1986. He was also an active member of the International Association of Public Transport (UITP) where he was member of the executive committee and guest speaker on various occasions.

== Recognitions ==
Gonzalez-Lander received multiple decorations during his professional career, most notably the Orden Francisco de Miranda and Orden Libertador from the Venezuelan government; the Ordre National de la Légion d'Honneur from the French Government; the Ordine al Merito della Repubblica Italiana from the Italian Government; and Commander of the Order of Orange-Nassau which he received from the hands of Queen Beatrix of the Netherlands.

== Personal life ==
His family and close friends called him by his childhood nickname of "Pepito". He married Maria Isabel Marcano Camino in Caracas in 1960 and had two children. Except for the time the couple spent in Boston, MA during his graduate studies, the family always lived in Caracas. Gonzalez-Lander was also an accomplished amateur painter. During a period of 18 years he painted dozens of oil canvases mostly depicting urban scenes of early twentieth century Caracas and many portraits of his family. Many of his friends and colleagues remember with amusement his 1971 bright yellow VW beetle which he drove on weekends around the city. His health took a downward turn in his early sixties partly a result of years of cigarette smoking.

He died in Caracas on January 18, 2000, at the age of 66.

== Legacy ==
On December 2, 1998, the City of Caracas opened the "Ingeniero José González Lander" West Bus Terminal better known as La Bandera due to its location.

In his honor, the building that houses Metro's Operations Control Center and its training facilities was named "Jose Gonzalez Lander."

On June 22, 2000, a children's park in the Caracas neighborhood of Colinas de Bello Monte was named José Gonzalez Lander. The Mayor of the Municipality of Baruta, at the time Ms. Ivonne Attas, was present at the dedication ceremony which included the unveiling of a bust statue in his likeness (since removed.)

On July 22, 2021, the Venezuelan Society of Engineers (Colegio de Ingenieros de Venezuela) added the name of Mr. Gonzalez Lander to the walls of the society's Hall of Honor. The president of the society, Mr. Enzo Betancourt, and the French ambassador to Venezuela, Mr. Romain Nadal, were keynote speakers at the ceremony.
