= Capuchinos station =

Caracas Metro station in Venezuela

Capuchinos
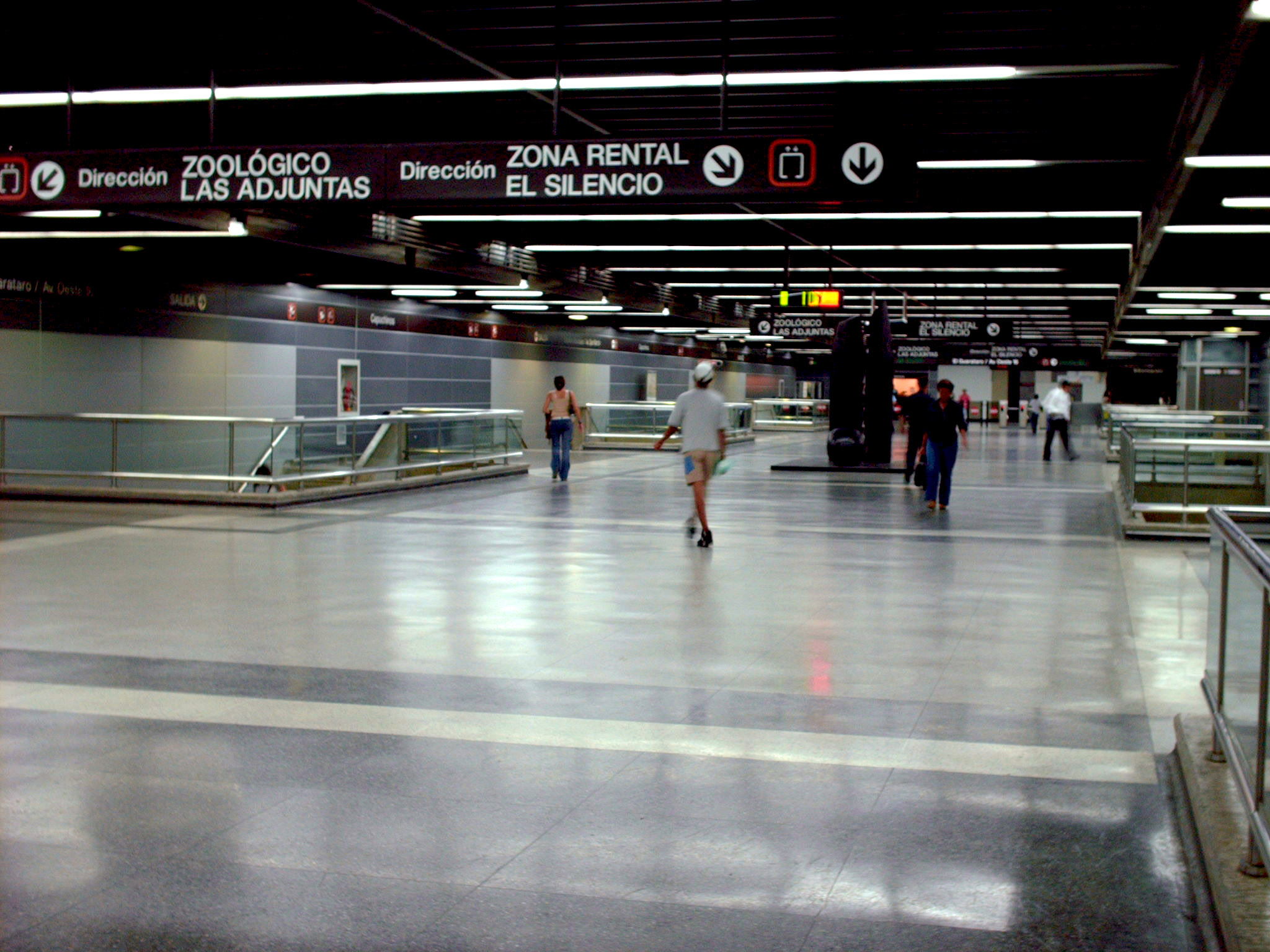
- Interior of the station

General information
- Location: San Juan parish, Municipio; Libertador, Capital District; Venezuela
- Coordinates: 10°29′54″N 66°55′33.1″W
- System: Caracas Metro rapid transit station
- Operator: C.A. Metro de Caracas
- Line: Line 2, Line 4
- Platforms: 2 island platforms
- Tracks: 4

Construction
- Structure type: underground

History
- Opened: 6 November 1988

Services
Preceding station	Caracas Metro	Following station
El Silencio Terminus	Line 2	Maternidad toward Zoológico or Las Adjuntas
through to Line 2 via Maternidad	Line 4	Teatros toward Zona Rental
Location

Capuchinos is a Caracas Metro station on Lines 2 and 4. The Line 2 station was opened on 6 November 1988 as part of the extension of the line from La Paz to El Silencio station. The station is between El Silencio and Maternidad.
