= Teatros station =

Caracas metro station

Teatros
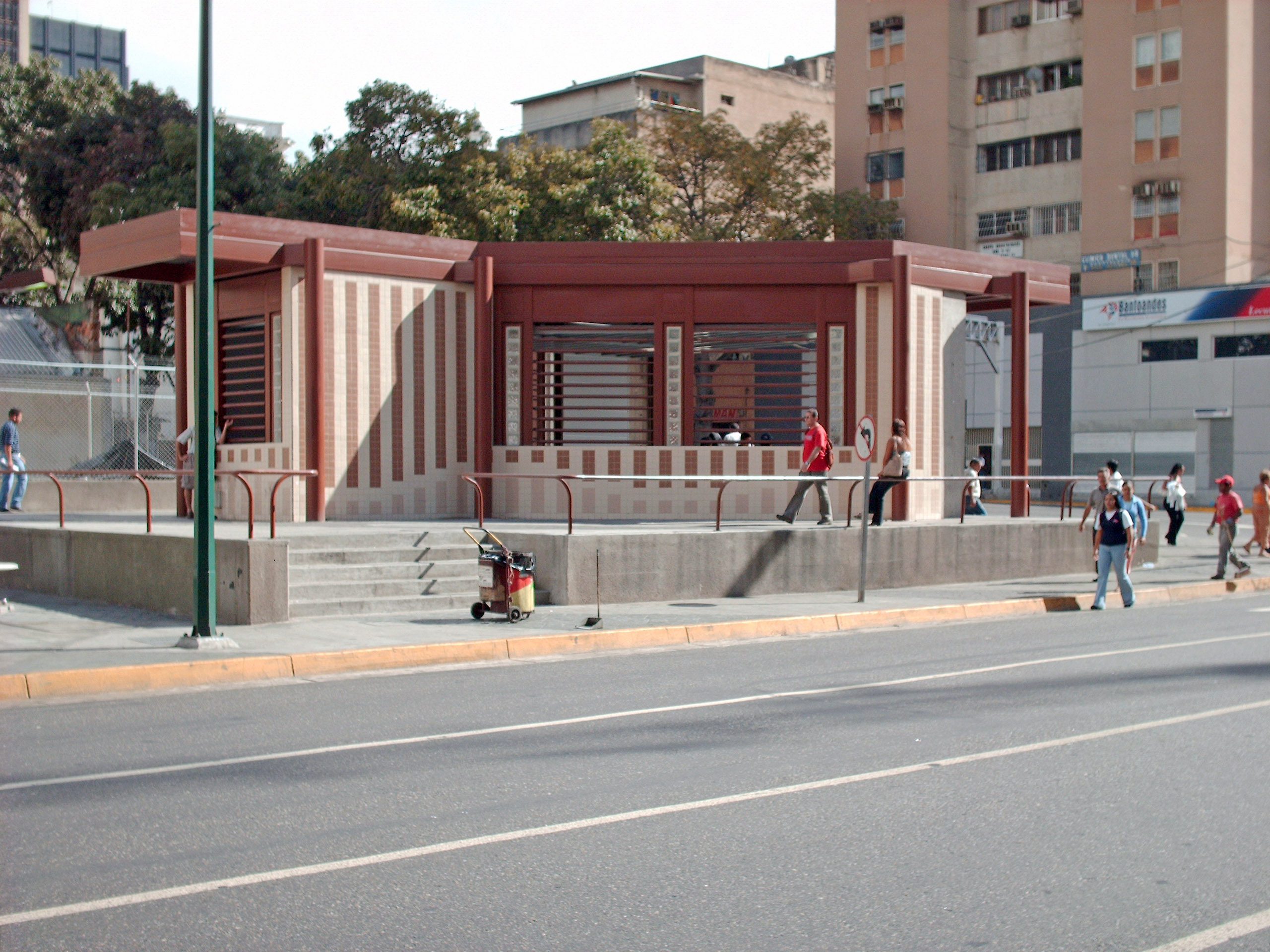
- Access to the station on Avenida Lecuna

General information
- Location: Santa Teresa parish, Municipio; Libertador, Capital District; Venezuela
- Coordinates: 10°30′04.4″N 66°55′01.8″W
- System: Caracas Metro rapid transit station
- Operator: C.A. Metro de Caracas
- Line: Line 4
- Platforms: 1 island platform
- Tracks: 2

Construction
- Structure type: underground

History
- Opened: 19 July 2006

Services
Preceding station	Caracas Metro	Following station
Capuchinos Terminus	Line 4	Nuevo Circo toward Zona Rental
Location

Teatros is a Caracas Metro station on Line 4. It was opened on 19 July 2006 as part of the inaugural section of the line between Capuchinos and Zona Rental. The station is located between Capuchinos and Nuevo Circo.
