= Guarenas-Guatire =

Guarenas-Guatire may refer to:

== Places ==
- Guarenas-Guatire, a conurbation located in Miranda state (Venezuela) and part of the Greater Caracas Area.

== Transport ==
- Guarenas / Guatire Metro, a dual subway / light rail system project to connect the twin cities and intermediate communities to Caracas
