= Bello Monte station =

Caracas metro station

Bello Monte
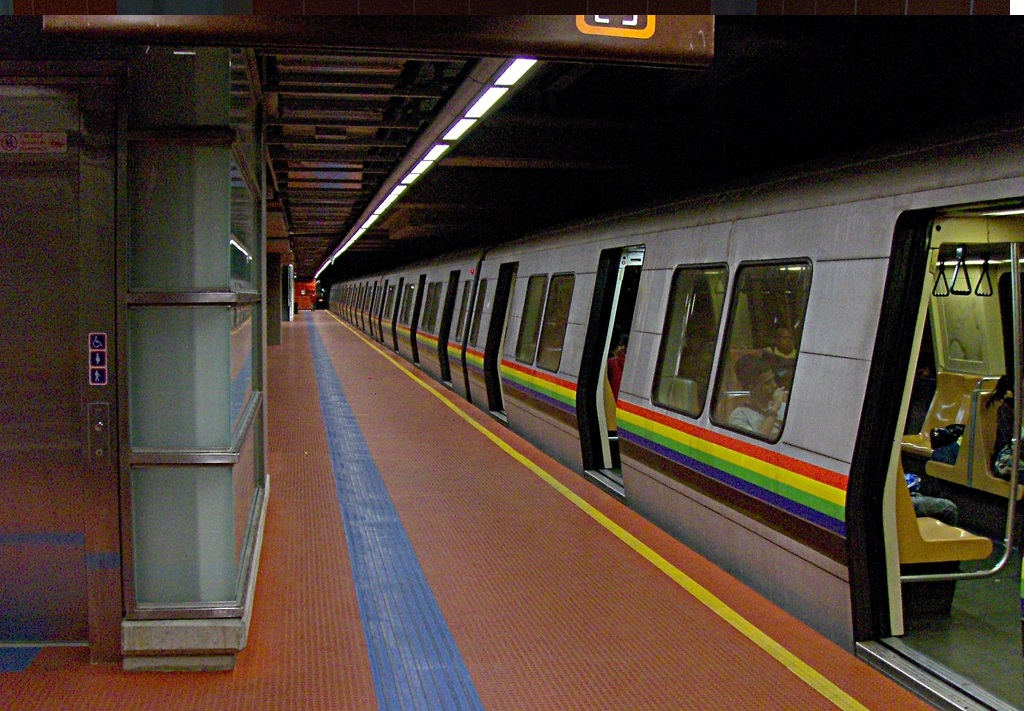

General information
- Location: Venezuela
- Coordinates: 10°29′13.8″N 66°52′28″W
- System: Caracas Metro station
- Line: Line 5

History
- Opened: 3 November 2015

Services
Preceding station	Caracas Metro	Following station
Zona Rental Terminus	Line 5	Terminus
Location

Bello Monte is a Caracas Metro station on Line 5. It is an eastern terminus of the line. The station was opened on 3 November 2015 as part of the first section of the line, which only included two stations — Zona Rental and Bello Monte. The name of the station originates from Bello Monte, a neighborhood where the station is located.

== History ==
Line 5 began construction in 2007 with Bello Monte station being one of ten planned stations on the line, but it was the only new station to open in 2015.

The station was predicted to serve 80,000 people daily when it opened.
