= Parque Central station =

Caracas metro station

Parque Central
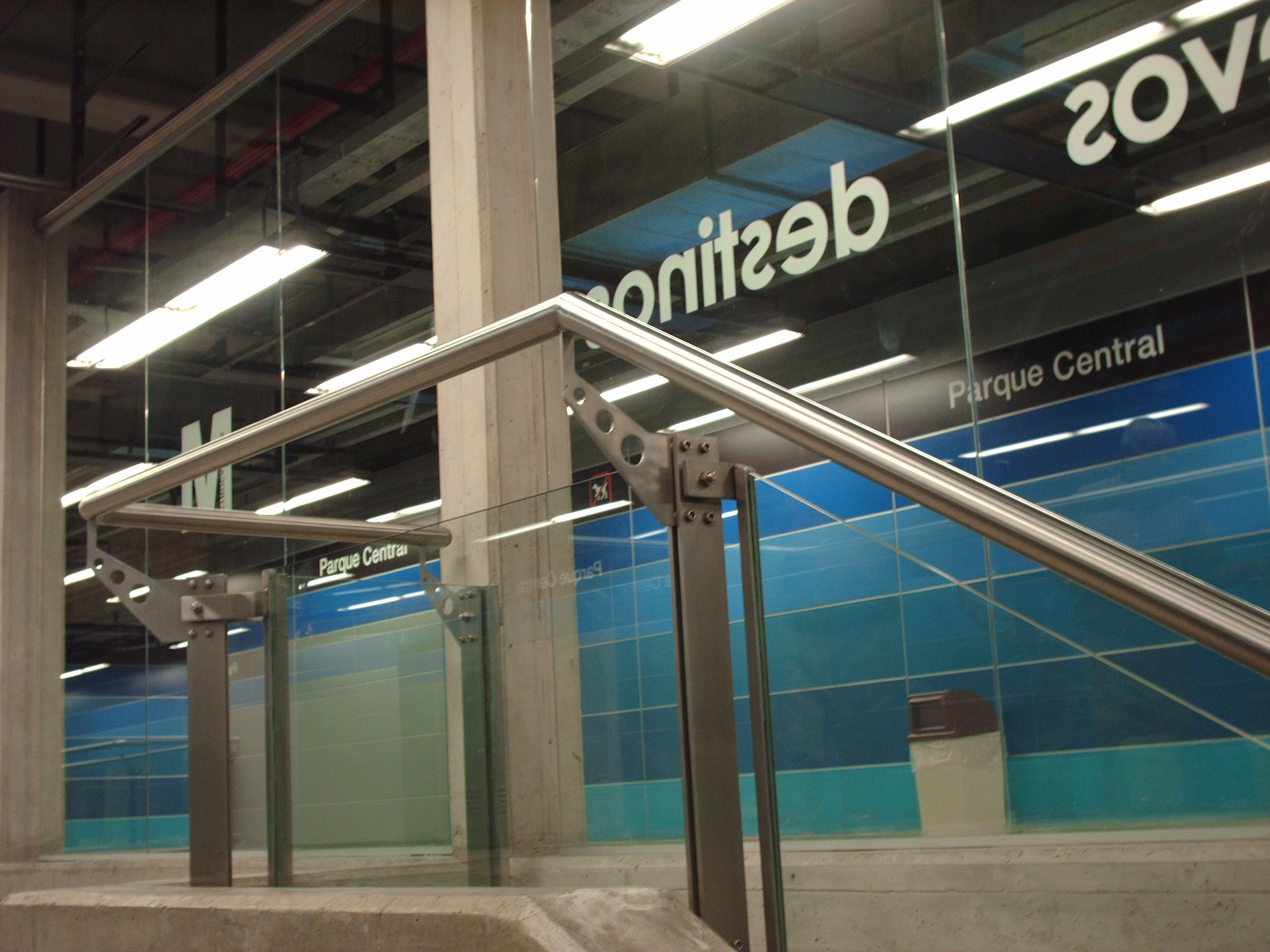

General information
- Location: Venezuela
- Coordinates: 10°29′54.5″N 66°53′58.5″W
- System: Caracas Metro station
- Line: Line 4

History
- Opened: 19 July 2006

Services
Preceding station	Caracas Metro	Following station
Nuevo Circo toward Capuchinos	Line 4	Zona Rental Terminus
Location

Parque Central is a Caracas Metro station on Line 4. It was opened on 19 July 2006 as part of the inaugural section of the line between Capuchinos and Zona Rental. The station is located between Nuevo Circo and Zona Rental.
