= Larosa =

LaRosa is a common surname, meaning "the rose" in Italian. LaRosa is a common surname within Sicilian families, and is of Cantabrian-Castilian origin. Larrosa is the Aragonese form of this surname.

== People with the surname ==
- Guy LaRosa (born 1912), American concert pianist
- Guy William (Bill) LaRosa (born 1946), American businessman
- Eugenio La Rosa (born 1962), Peruvian footballer
- Guillermo La Rosa (born 1952), Peruvian footballer
- Vincenzo La Rosa (1941-2014) Italian archaeologist
- Isabel LaRosa (born 2004), Cuban-American singer
- Julius La Rosa (1930-2016), American singer
- Liliana La Rosa (born 1964), Peruvian nurse and academic
- Luca La Rosa (born 1988), Italian footballer
- Maria LaRosa (born 1976), American meteorologist
- Tara LaRosa (born 1978), American mixed martial artist

== See also ==
- LaRosa's Pizzeria
- La Rösa, a hamlet in the upper part of the Val Poschiavo in the canton of Graubünden, Switzerland
- V. La Rosa and Sons Macaroni Company (La Rosa brand of macaroni)
