= Guarenas / Guatire Metro =

Metro/light rail project in Caracas, Venezuela

Guarenas / Guatire Metro is a combined metro/light rail project of the Caracas Metro to connect the twin cities of the Guarenas-Guatire conurbation and intermediate communities to Caracas, Venezuela.

== Overview ==
The 2 billion dollar project aimed to accommodate 125,000 daily users consists of 2 distinct parts the urban metro line and suburban light rail line. Construction started on March 18, 2007 with a planned completion projected for late July 2012. The opening date was later changed to 2015 and then to 2016. As of November 2022, there is no official opening date.

== Lines ==
The metro portion of the project will have the following four stations (part of Line 5):

- Miranda/Hugo Chávez (existing station on Line 1; formerly: Parque del Este II)
- Montecristo
- Boleíta
- El Marqués
- Warairarepano (transfer station for the light rail portion; formerly: Guaraira Repano)

The light rail portion will have the following stations:

- Warairarepano (transfer station for the metro portion; formerly: Guaraira Repano)
- Caucaugüita
- Belén
- Guarenas I
- Guarenas II
- Guatire I
- Guatire II

== See also ==
- IAFE – Venezuelan National Railway
