= Caracas Metrobus =

Public transit system in Venezuela

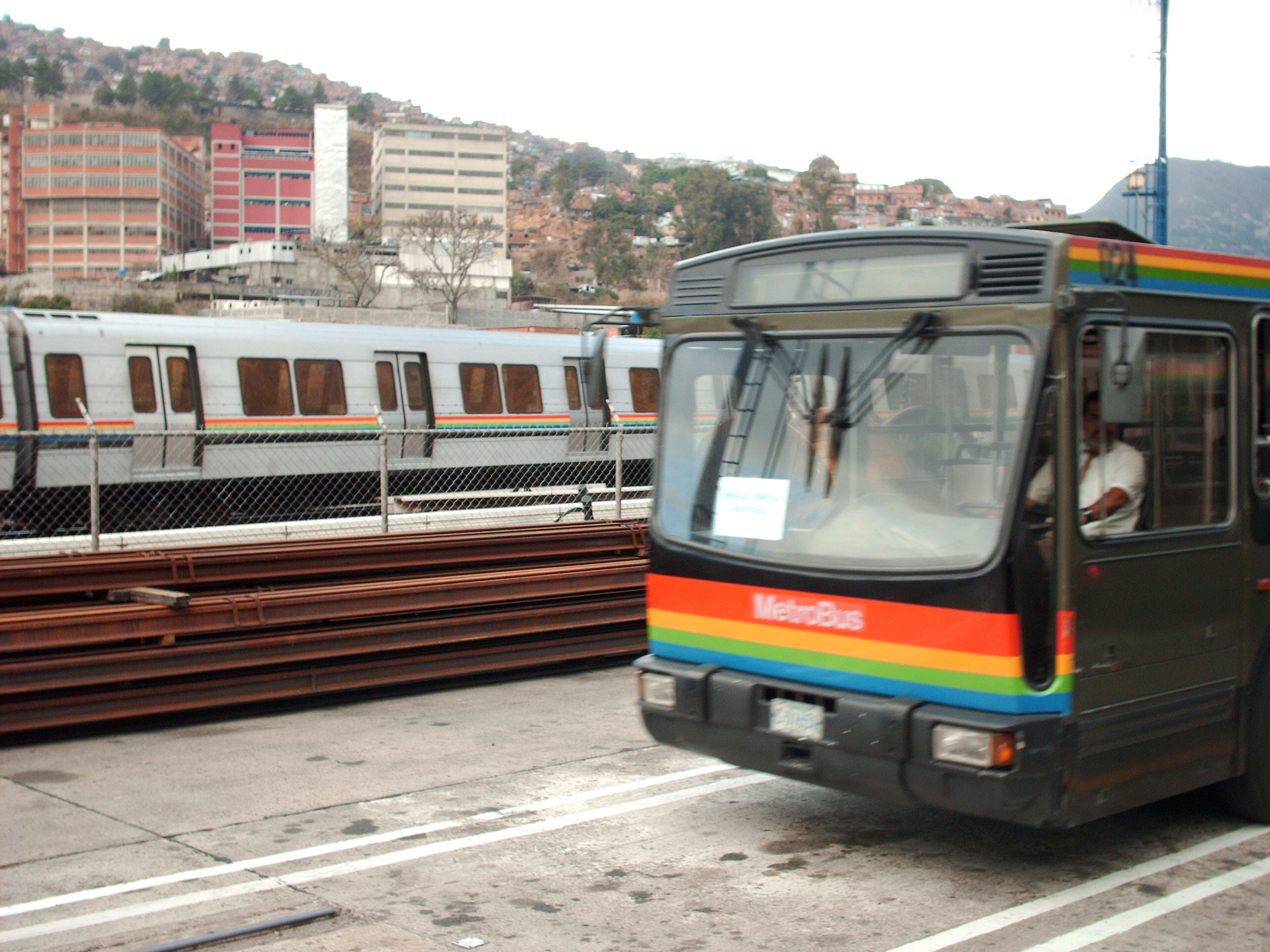
Metrobus and Metro

The Caracas Metrobus is a public transit system in Venezuela. The bus network consists of 20 urban and 4 suburban routes which connect to the nearby cities of Los Teques, Guarenas, Guatire and San Antonio de Los Altos. At present, it consists of a fleet of 220 buses.
