= Zona Rental station =

Caracas metro station

Zona Rental
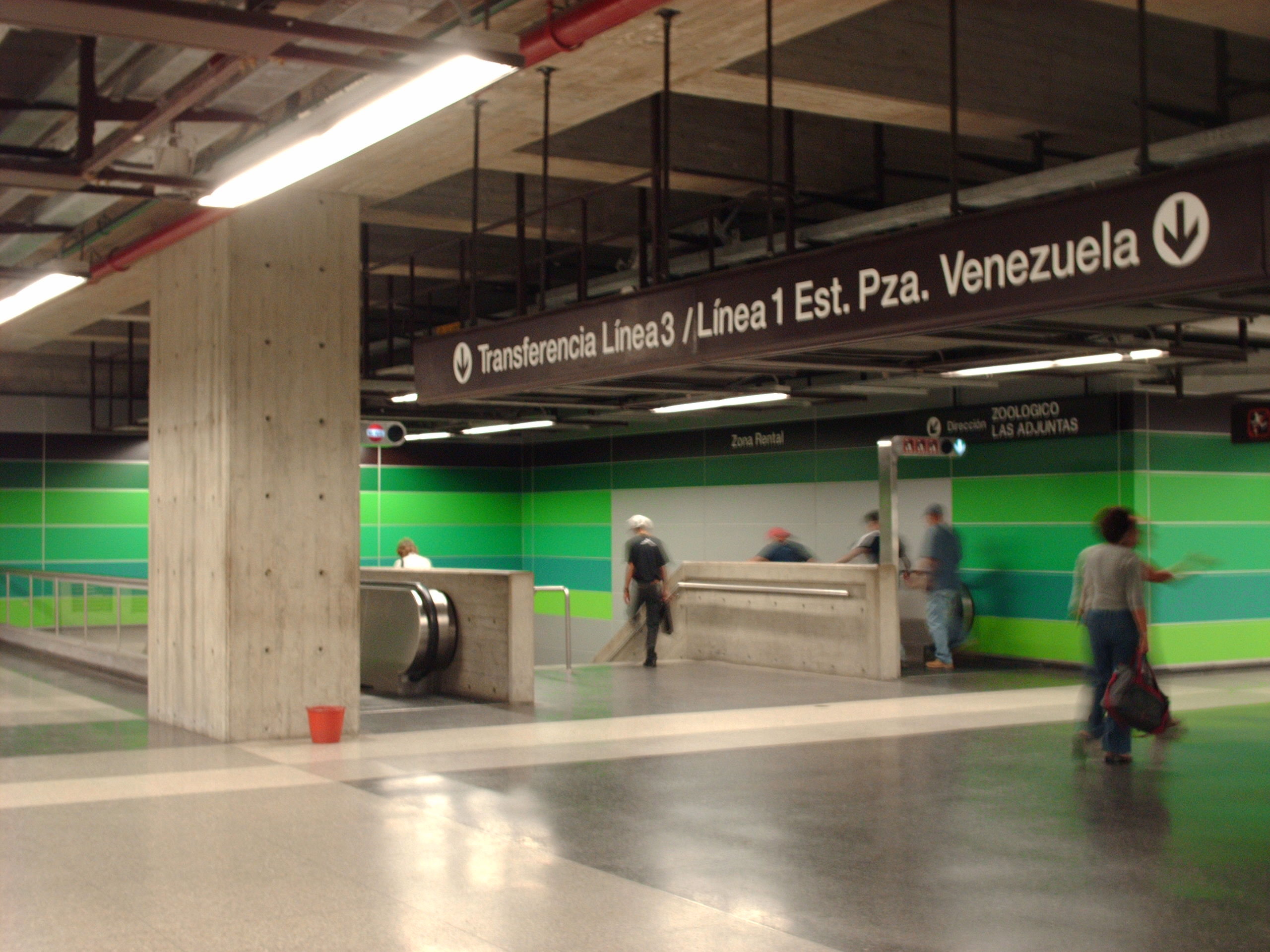

General information
- Location: Venezuela
- Coordinates: 10°29′41.9″N 66°52′58.6″W
- System: Caracas Metro station
- Line: Line 4, Line 5

History
- Opened: 19 July 2006

Services
Preceding station	Caracas Metro	Following station
Parque Central toward Capuchinos	Line 4	Terminus
Terminus	Line 5	Bello Monte Terminus
Location

Zona Rental is a Caracas Metro station on Lines 4 and 5. It is a terminus of both lines. Line 4 station was opened on 19 July 2006 as part of the inaugural section of the line between Capuchinos and Zona Rental. The adjacent station is station is Parque Central. On 3 November 2015 the first section of Line 5 was opened. It consists of only two stations, Zona Rental and Bello Monte.
