= El Valle station =

Caracas metro station

El Valle
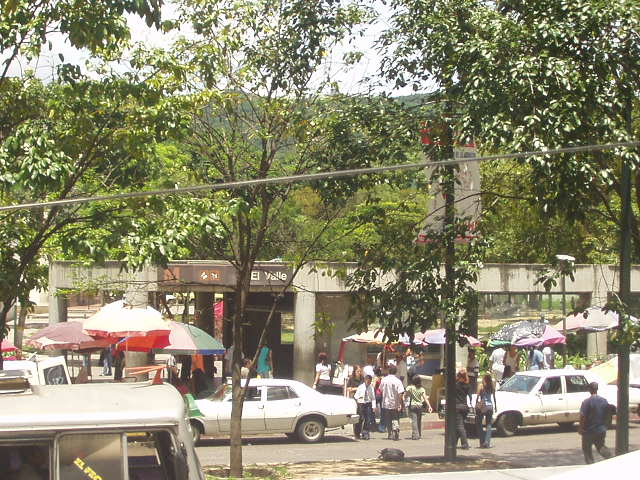
- Station in 2004

General information
- Location: Venezuela
- Coordinates: 10°28′07.3″N 66°54′16.5″W
- System: Caracas Metro station
- Line: Line 3

History
- Opened: 18 December 1994

Services
Preceding station	Caracas Metro	Following station
La Bandera toward Plaza Venezuela	Line 3	Los Jardines toward La Rinconada
Location

El Valle is a Caracas Metro station on Line 3. It was opened on 18 December 1994 as the southern terminus of the inaugural section of Line 3 from Plaza Venezuela to El Valle. The station is between La Bandera and Los Jardines. On 15 October 2006 the line was extended south to La Rinconada, but the intermediate stations were only opened on 9 January 2010.
