= Plaza Venezuela station =

Caracas metro station

Plaza Venezuela
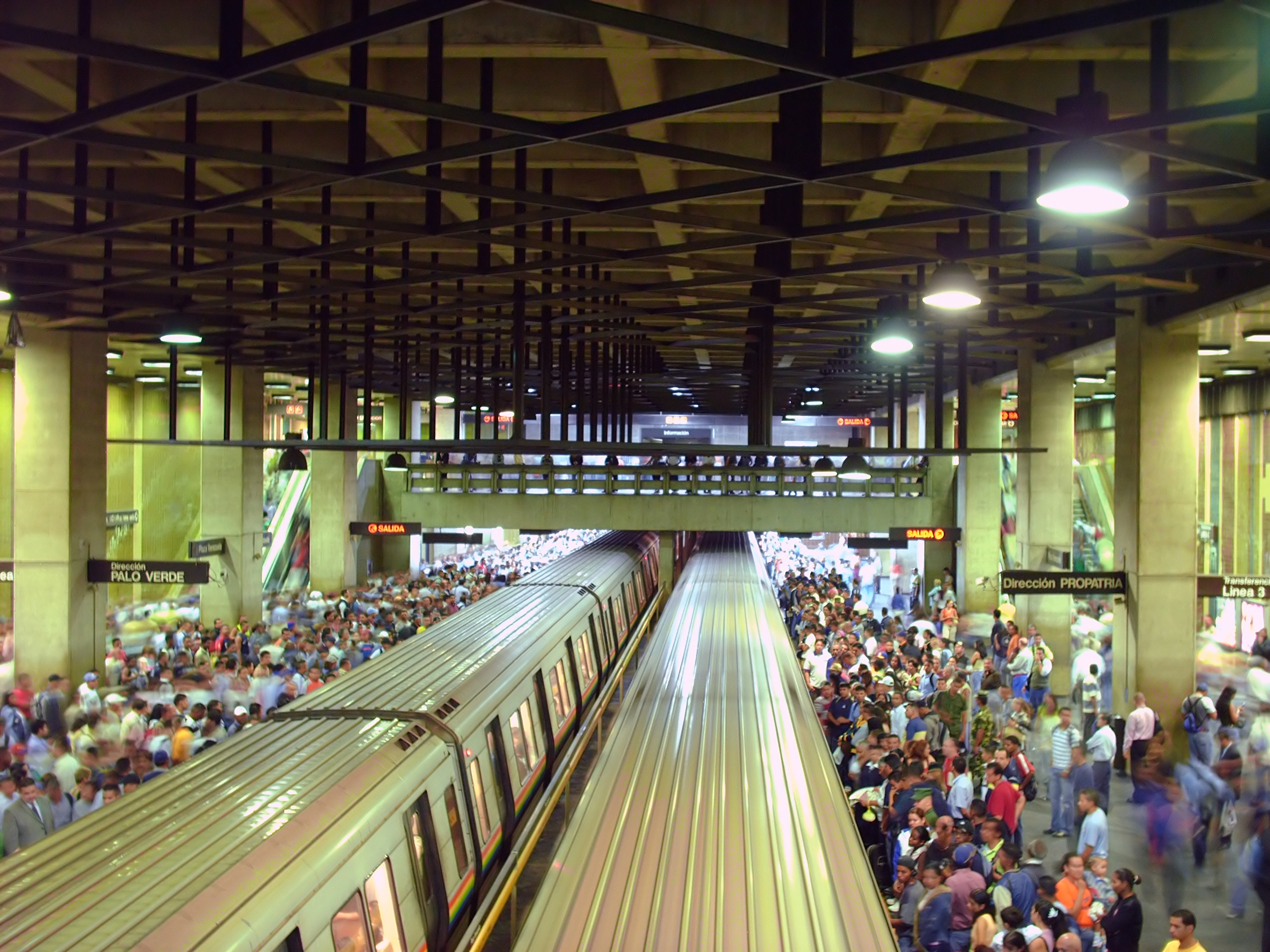
- The platforms of Line 1

General information
- Location: El Recreo parish, Municipio; Libertador, Capital District; Venezuela
- Coordinates: 10°29′46″N 66°52′54.9″W
- System: Caracas Metro rapid transit station
- Operator: C.A. Metro de Caracas
- Line: Line 1, Line 3
- Platforms: 2 side platforms (upper level); 2 side platforms (lower level)
- Tracks: 4 (2 on each level)
- Connections: Line 4

Construction
- Structure type: underground

History
- Opened: 27 March 1983

Services
Preceding station	Caracas Metro	Following station
Colegio de Ingenieros toward Propatria	Line 1	Sabana Grande toward Palo Verde
Terminus	Line 3	Ciudad Universitaria toward La Rinconada
Location

Plaza Venezuela is a Caracas Metro station on Lines 1 and 3. The Line 1 station was opened on 27 March 1983 as part of the extension of the line from La Hoyada to Chacaíto. The station is between Colegio de Ingenieros and Sabana Grande.

The Line 3 station was opened on 18 December 1994 as the northern terminus of the inaugural section of the line, from Plaza Venezuela to El Valle. The adjacent station is Ciudad Universitaria.

The name of the station originates from nearby Plaza Venezuela.
