= La Rinconada station =

Metro station in Caracas, Venezuela

La Rinconada

General information
- Location: La Rinconada, Caracas; Venezuela
- Coordinates: 10°26′03.1″N 66°56′11.9″W
- System: Caracas Metro station
- Line: Line 3

History
- Opened: 15 October 2006

Services
| Preceding station | Caracas Metro | Following station |
|---|---|---|
| Mercado toward Plaza Venezuela | Line 3 | Terminus |
Location

La Rinconada is a Caracas Metro station on Line 3. It is the southern terminus of the line.

== History ==
It was opened on 15 October 2006 as part of the extension of Line 3 from El Valle to La Rinconada. An adjacent commuter rail station, Libertador Simón Bolívar Terminal opened at the same time and serves towns in the Tuy Valley.

The intermediate stations of Line 3 were only opened on 9 January 2010. The adjacent station is Mercado.
