= La Paz station (Caracas) =

Caracas Metro station in Venezuela

La Paz
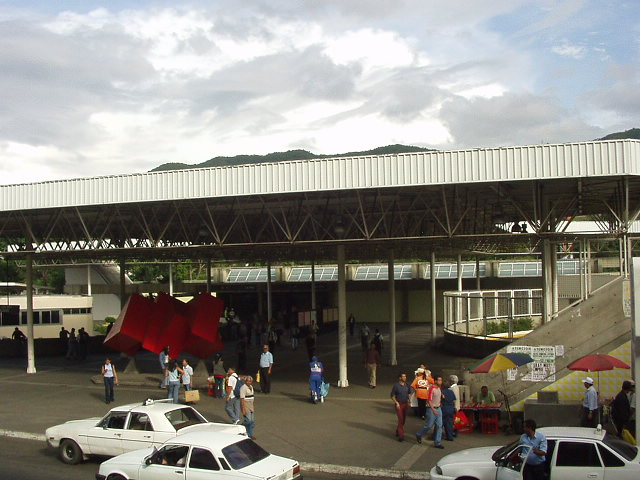
- Station in 2004

General information
- Location: El Paraíso parish, Municipio; Libertador, Capital District; Venezuela
- Coordinates: 10°29′06.8″N 66°56′48.3″W
- System: Caracas Metro rapid transit station
- Operator: C.A. Metro de Caracas
- Line: Line 2
- Platforms: 2 side platforms
- Tracks: 2

Construction
- Structure type: underground

History
- Opened: 4 October 1987

Services
Preceding station	Caracas Metro	Following station
Artigas toward El Silencio	Line 2	La Yaguara toward Zoológico or Las Adjuntas
Location

La Paz is a Caracas Metro station on Line 2. It was opened on 4 October 1987 as part of the inaugural section of Line 2 from La Paz to Las Adjuntas and Zoológico. The station served as the northern terminus of Line 2 until 6 November 1988, when the line was extended to El Silencio. The station is between Artigas and La Yaguara.
