= El Silencio station =

Caracas metro station in Venezuela

El Silencio
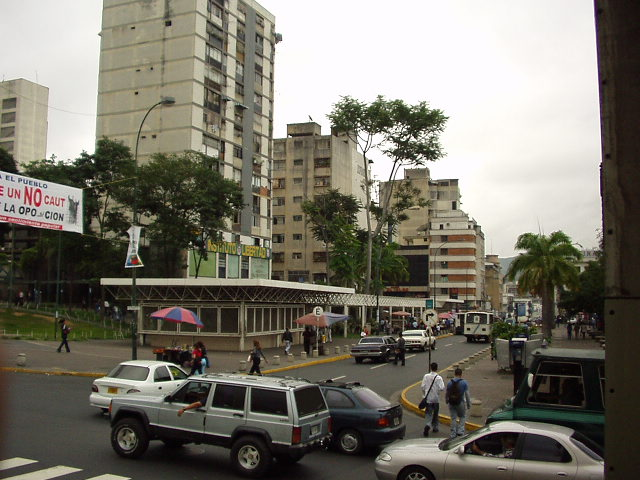
- Station in 2004

General information
- Location: Catedral parish, Municipio; Libertador, Capital District; Venezuela
- Coordinates: 10°30′20.0″N 66°55′08.0″W
- System: Caracas Metro rapid transit station
- Operator: C.A. Metro de Caracas
- Line: Line 2
- Platforms: 2 side platforms
- Tracks: 2
- Connections: Line 1

Construction
- Structure type: underground

History
- Opened: 6 November 1988

Services
| Preceding station | Caracas Metro | Following station |
|---|---|---|
| Terminus | Line 2 | Capuchinos toward Zoológico or Las Adjuntas |
Location

El Silencio is a Caracas Metro station on Line 2. It was opened on 6 November 1988 as part of the extension of Line 2 from La Paz to El Silencio. The station serves as the northern terminus of the line and it is a transfer station, connected with Line 1 via Capitolio. The following station is Capuchinos.

It is named after the El Silencio neighborhood, built by Carlos Raúl Villanueva.

In February 2019, the station burned in a large fire of unknown origin.
