= Zoológico station =

Caracas metro station

Zoológico
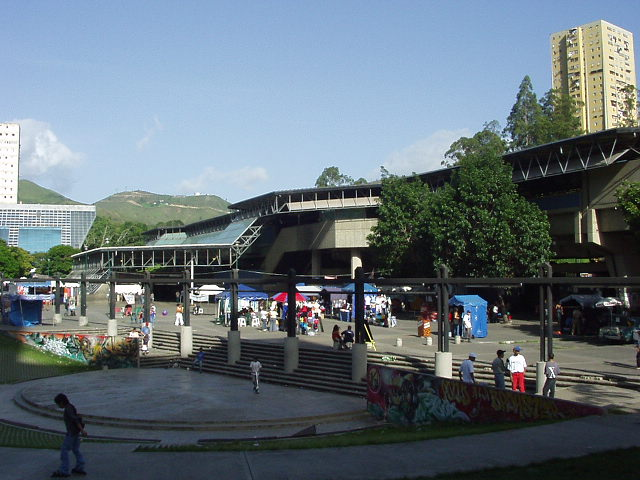
- Station in 2004

General information
- Location: Venezuela
- Coordinates: 10°25′58.5″N 66°58′22.3″W
- System: Caracas Metro station
- Operator: C.A. Metro de Caracas
- Line: Line 2
- Platforms: 2 side platforms
- Tracks: 2

History
- Opened: 4 October 1987

Services
Preceding station	Caracas Metro	Following station
Caricuao toward El Silencio	Line 2	Terminus
Location

Zoológico is a Caracas Metro station on Line 2. It was opened on 4 October 1987 as part of the inaugural section of Line 2 from La Paz to Las Adjuntas and Zoológico. It serves as the terminus of one of the two southern branches of the line. The adjacent station is Caricuao.
