= Las Adjuntas station =

Caracas metro station

Las Adjuntas
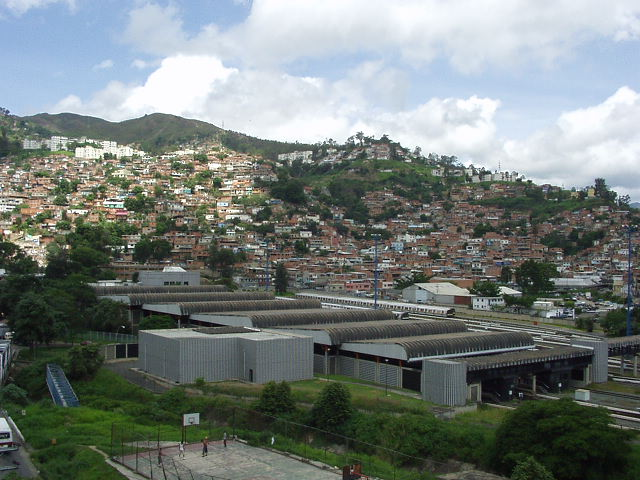
- Station in 2018

General information
- Location: Venezuela
- Coordinates: 10°25′33.4″N 67°00′45.8″W
- System: Caracas Metro station
- Line: Line 2

History
- Opened: 4 October 1987

Services
Preceding station	Caracas Metro	Following station
Ruiz Pineda toward El Silencio	Line 2	Terminus
Terminus	Los Teques Metro	Ayacucho toward Independencia
Location

Las Adjuntas is a common station shared by two Venezuelan metro lines of the Caracas Metro and the Los Teques Metro. The station has two platforms that are connected by three pedestrian overpasses. Each platform serves up to two trains from their respective metro lines. The metro station was opened on 4 October 1987 as part of the inaugural section of Line 2 from La Paz to Las Adjuntas and Zoológico. The adjacent station is Ruiz Pineda.
