= Caracas Metro =

Rapid transit system in Venezuela

Overview
- Native name: Metro de Caracas
- Locale: Caracas, Venezuela
- Transit type: Rapid transit
- Number of lines: 4 (+ Los Teques Metro)
- Number of stations: 46 (51 incl. Los Teques Metro) (Note: Counting transfer stations between lines only once.)
- Daily ridership: 1,200,000 (February 2025)

Operation
- Began operation: January 2, 1983; 43 years ago
- Operator: C.A. Metro de Caracas

Technical
- System length: 54.1 km (33.6 mi); 63.6 km (39.5 mi) (incl. Los Teques Metro)
- Track gauge: 1,435 mm (4 ft 8 1/2 in) standard gauge
- Electrification: 750 V DC third rail

The Caracas Metro (Spanish: Metro de Caracas) is a mass rapid transit system serving Caracas, Venezuela. It opened in 1983 and currently has 48 stations.

== History ==
It was constructed and is operated by Compañía Anónima Metro de Caracas, a government-owned company that was founded in 1977 by José González-Lander who headed the project for more than thirty years since the early planning stages in the 1960s. Its motto is "Somos parte de tu vida" (translated as 'We are part of your life'). In 1978 MTA – New York City Transit's R46 #816 (now 5866) was shipped from the Pullman Standard's plant as a sample of rolling stock to be used for the new metro system that was under construction at the time.

It was inaugurated on January 2, 1983 with 11.5 km (7.1 mi) and currently the total length of the railway reaches 63.6 km (39.5 mi). Its purpose is to contribute to the development of collective transportation in Caracas and its immediate area, through the planning, construction, and commercial exploitation of an integrated transportation system. The C. A. Metro de Caracas is in charge of its construction, operation and exploitation as a decentralized public body attached to the Ministry of People's Power for Land Transportation.

As a consequence of the Crisis in Venezuela, by October 2018 it was estimated that 25% of the Caracas Metro trains were out of service due to lack of maintenance. In 2020, nine of them remain operational. Forty-eight trains on Line 1; six of 44 on Line 2; and four of 16 on Line 3; which, together with electrical failures, causes users to experience permanent delays. In 2022, the Caracas Metro only had 23 of the 169 trains operational.

The system has 48 stations. The company is run by Major General Juan Carlos Du Bolay Perozo.

== Lines ==
Diagram of the metro network integrated with other public transport services in Greater Caracas

The Caracas Metro currently has the following lines in operation:

Line	Section	Length	Stations	Transfer Stations	Notes
1	Propatria ↔ Palo Verde	20.4 km	22	4	The original 8 station line began operations on Jan. 2, 1983 and expanded 3 more times; the latest and final rail expansion of this line occurred on Nov. 19, 1989. The Capitolio station was redesigned to allow passenger transfer by way of a passageway to and from the El Silencio station. Also the Plaza Venezuela station was twice remodelled, first to accommodate line 3 transfer (1994) and later a passageway to the Zona Rental station (2006).
2	El Silencio ↔ Zoológico	17.8 km	13	3	A short run service was opened Oct 4, 1987 and fully expanded to El Silencio on Nov 6, 1988. The original line use has changed; before Line 4 opened on July 18, 2006, the train from the terminal station El Silencio served both Las Adjuntas and Zoológico terminal stations.
3	Plaza Venezuela ↔ La Rinconada	10.4 km	8	2	The original line opened in Dec. 18, 1994 and operated between Plaza Venezuela and El Valle. In 2006 an extension to La Rinconada began to operate partially (Users had to transfer trains at El Valle stations). In 2010 three new stations were inaugurated and the line became fully operational between Plaza Venezuela and La Rinconada.
4	Zona Rental ↔ Capuchinos ( ↔ Las Adjuntas)	5.5 km	5	3	Shortly after Line 4 was opened, it was co-named line 2, at this time Caracas Metro makes no distinction between the 2 separate lines other than that they serve distinct terminal stations.
TOTAL:		54.1 km	48		
Los Teques Metro	Las Adjuntas ↔ Independencia	11.2 km	5	1	Opened in 2006. Also operated by Metro de Caracas. Effectively operates as an extension of Line 2/4.

Former logo of Caracas Metro

These lines were built between 1978 and 2006. Line 2 has four terminal stations.

Part of Line 2 was constructed as Line 4, but after its inauguration it was renamed Line 2. One must transfer on Line 3 at El Valle station to continue the ride.

Former logo of Caracas Metro

Construction of the first phase of Line 4 (now officially renamed Line 2) started in 2001; this line runs parallel to Line 1 to the south, and connects Plaza Venezuela station on Line 1 with Capuchinos station on Line 2. It is expected to provide much needed relief to congestion along this segment of Line 1 where most of Metro's ridership is concentrated.

== Commuter rail transfer points ==
Inauguration of Caracas Metro by president Luis Herrera Campins, January 2, 1983

Metrobus logo

Construction was begun on the Los Teques Metro from Caracas Metro Las Adjuntas station (the expanded station with independent platforms connected by overhead walkways is now common to both metro systems) to the suburban city of Los Teques Alí Primera (formerly called El Tambor) station in 2001 and completed November 3, 2006.

=== IFE ===
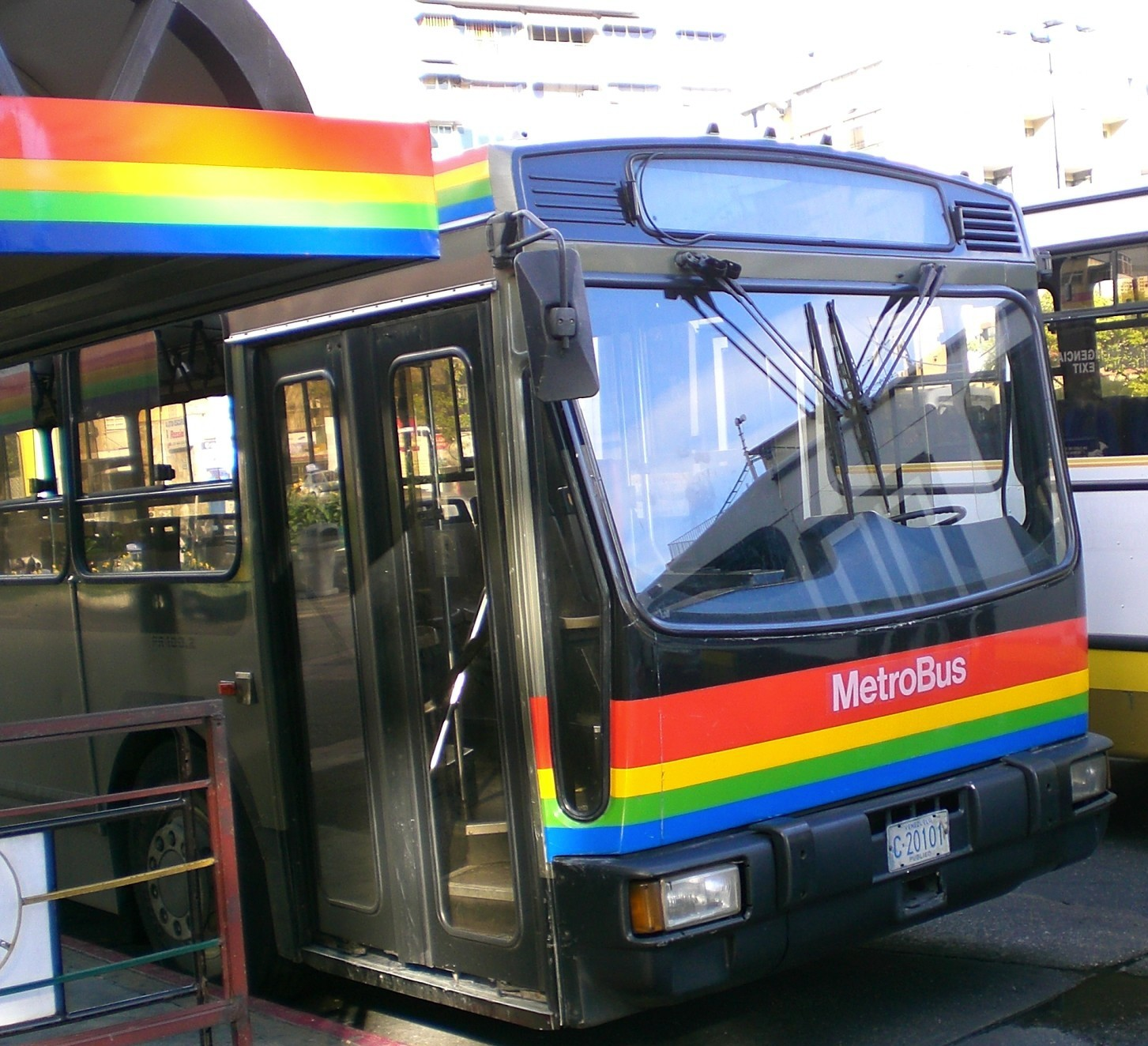
Metrobus unit

Line 3 station La Rinconada is the interchange station between the Caracas Metro and the Caracas train station Libertador Simón Bolívar, where connections can be made to and from Charallave and Cúa.

=== Guarenas/Guatire Metro ===
The Guarenas / Guatire Metro is a new line with the intention of providing access to the eastern suburban communities. Both subsystems would allow for transfers at the Guaraira Repano (Petare North) station. In December 2006, the government awarded a 2 billion dollar contract for the construction of the new line between a soon-to-be-built Caracas Metro Parque del Este II station and the nearby twin cities of Guarenas/Guatire, with completion set for July 2012. However, by November 2012, only 7% of the metro project had been completed, and the completion date had slipped to at least 2016. As of November 2022, there is no official opening date.

== Services ==
=== Metrobus ===
The system possesses a complementary bus transit network called the Metrobus, which covers 20 urban routes and four suburban routes, with the aim of transporting users to other popular destinations in the Greater Caracas area that are not reached by the metro, including bedroom communities close to the city.

=== External ticket sale ===
A modality implanted by the enterprise is the wholesale of tickets used in the Metro and in the Metrobús. A number of tickets is sold to some middlemen, and from there to authorized points of sale, such as kiosks and other commercial establishments. This allows Metro users to buy tickets outside of the stations, thus making them more widely available. The points of sale formally authorized for these operations are identified with the Metroseñal (Metro-sign). Tickets sold at such locals have a price discount of 3%.

== Fares and types of tickets ==
The values for tickets depend mostly on the number of travels the user has planned. There are also special prices for students, and fares differ for the Metrobús usage. The types of tickets and their pricings are listed below.

In 2018, the metro became free to ride. While Metro de Caracas said this was because of a passenger number assessment, workers revealed that the government had not given the company hard money for over a year, and they could not import paper to print tickets, necessitating unlocked turnstiles.

	Type	Coverage	Fare	Notes
Metro	One Way	One journey	Bs.F 4.00	Valid for all stations
Metro	Return Trip	Two journeys	Bs.F 8.00	Valid for all stations
Metro	One Way Metro Los Teques	One journey	Bs.F 8.00	Valid for all stations and Metro Los Teques
Metro	Multi-Abono	10 journeys	Bs.F 36.00	1 free ride AND valid for all stations
Metro	Multi-Abono Metro Los Teques	10 journeys, for the Metro and Metro Los Teques	Bs.F 72.00	Not available for external sale
Metrobús	Simple Integrated	Metro and one urban Metrobús route journey	Bs.F 6.00	
Metrobús	Simple Integrated	Metro and one of the suburban Metrobús route journey	Bs.F 6.00	Guarenas, La Guaira, La Rosa, San Antonio and Los Teques.
Metrobús	Multi-Abono Integrated	10 journeys, for the Metro and Metrobús	Bs.F 54.00	Not available for external sale

== Future expansions ==
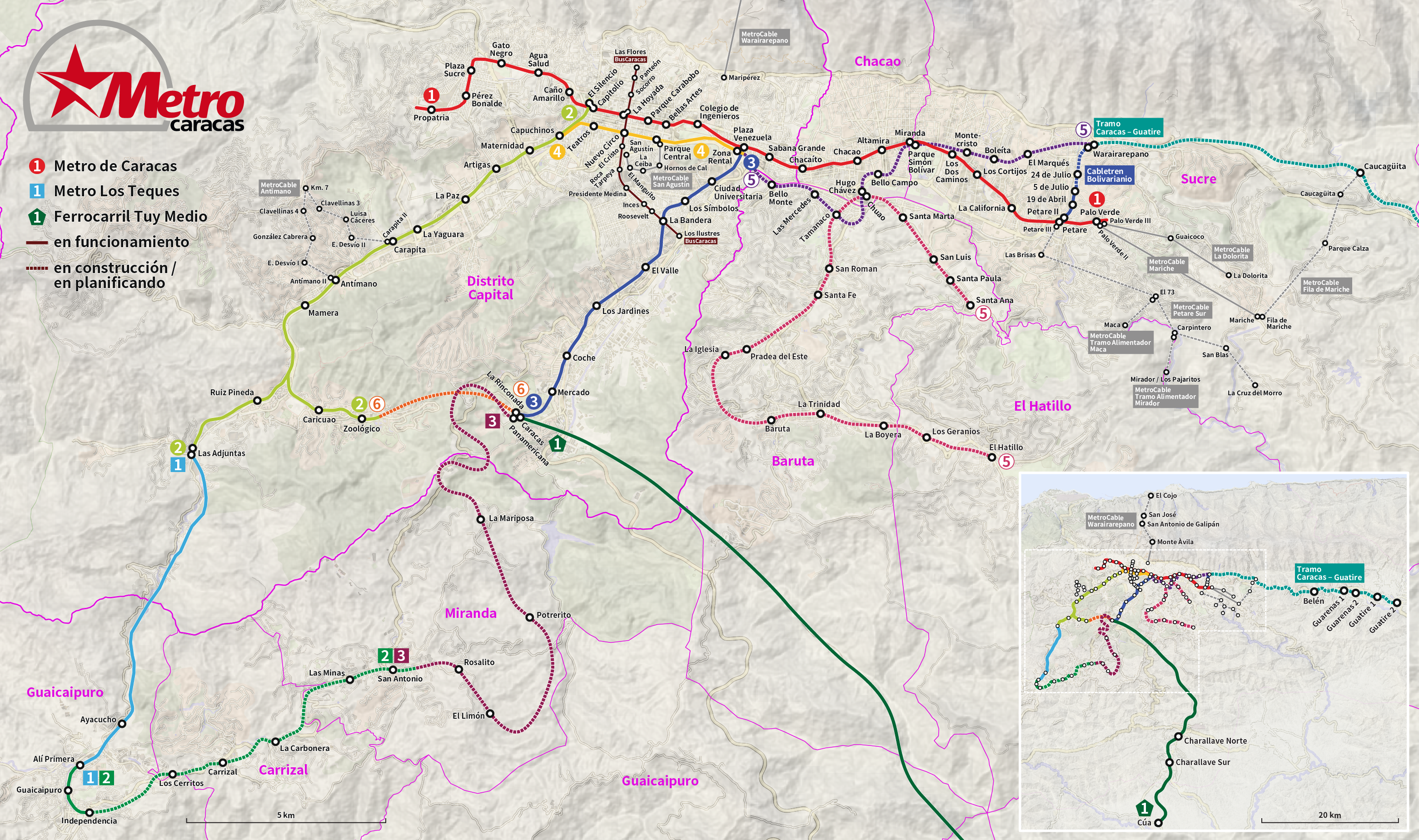
Map of the Caracas Metro, with current and future or under construction lines and stations (November 2016)

The next phases of the Line 2 extension (also known as Line 5 during construction phase) were to be constructed with an opening planned for 2012. The first project, a 7.5 km (4.7 mi) extension, includes six new stations in Bello Monte, Las Mercedes, Tamanaco, Chuao, Bello Campo and Parque del Este II station. A separate project was to be carried out simultaneously, an additional 6.7 km (4.2 mi) Line 2 extension (also known as Line 5 or Metro Guarenas-Guatire Urban Route during the construction phase) with four additional stations in Montecristo, Boleíta, El Marques and terminal/transfer station La Urbina (Petare Norte).

The La Urbina station was also destined to be the Caracas Guarenas-Guatire light rail transfer point. This 31.4 km (19.5 mi) long section was originally assigned funds for a 2012 completion.

Long term proposals include expanding the system with two more lines: Line 5 (15 km (9.3 mi) long) to southeast Caracas, and Line 6 (17 km (11 mi)) that would run parallel to Line 1 to the north.

== Incidents ==
- On July 30, 2007, a collision took place that killed one person and injured 11 others. It was on Line 1 at Plaza Sucre station at 9:09 a.m. when a train headed in the Propatria direction stopped on the platform. It was hit from behind by another traveling in the same direction. Although there has been much speculation about the cause of the accident, it is clear that there was a defect in the emergency braking system; the operational control centre from the La Hoyada station never activated the automatic braking mechanism when a train approaches a second train.
- On November 12, 2010, 33 people were arrested after staging a protest at Propatria Station over increasingly deteriorating service on the Metro.
- On 23 January 2017, several thousand Venezuelans protested throughout the country. The government had also cordoned of the planned march areas with police and closed all subway and transportation systems to the area.
- During the 2017 protests, it was common for the government to close Metro stations. On 4 April, 12 subway stations were closed; on 8 April, 16 subway stations and 19 Caracas Metrobus routes were closed. On 13 April, 27 stations were closed, and on 26 April the Metro was closed completely after being open for two hours, along with the suspension of the Metrobus and Bus Caracas services.
- On 5 February 2018, after a protests because of the delay of the Metro, tear gas was fired in the subway, causing the service to be suspended for 25 minutes.
- On 14 February 2018, Metro users had to walk across the subway tunnels after an electric failure.
- In July 2018, the Metro stopped issuing tickets as they ran out of paper for printing the tickets.
- In October 2018, it was announced that 25% of Caracas Metro trains were out of service due to a lack of maintenance.
- In March 2019, the metro was out of service for several days due to an energy blackout caused by the poor political and economic situation in the country.

== See also ==
- List of Caracas Metro stations
- List of Latin American rail transit systems by ridership
- List of metro systems
