= List of metropolitan areas in Venezuela =

List of metropolitan areas in Venezuela according to the Instituto Nacional de Estadistica (2013).

== Metropolitan areas ==
rank	metropolitan areas	core cities	states	population (2013)	Land area	Population density in km2 (2013)	Image
1	Greater Caracas	Caracas	Capital District, Miranda, Vargas	5,243,301	4715.1	1,223.41	
1	Metropolitan District of Caracas	Caracas, Petare, Baruta, Chacao, El Hatillo	Capital District and Miranda	3,273,863	777.1	4212.9	
1	Valles del Tuy Metropolitan Area	Ocumare del Tuy, Charallave, Santa Teresa del Tuy, Cúa	Miranda	754,081	1694	445.14	
1	Guarenas-Guatire conurbation	Guarenas, Guatire	Miranda	473,728	558	848.97	
1	Altos Mirandinos Metropolitan Area	Los Teques, San Antonio de Los Altos	Miranda	454,929	744	611.46	
1	Litoral Varguense conurbation	Maiquetia, Catia La Mar, Caraballeda, La Guaira	Vargas	341,325	942	362.34	
2	Maracaibo Metropolitan Area	Maracaibo, San Francisco, Jesús Enrique Lossada, Mara, La Cañada de Urdaneta	Zulia	2,487,471	9,010	276.07	
3	Valencia Metropolitan Area	Valencia, San Diego, Naguanagua, Tocuyito, San Joaquín, Güigüe, Mariara, Los Guayos, Guacara	Carabobo	2,074,329	2,799	741.09	
4	Barquisimeto Metropolitan Area	Barquisimeto, Cabudare	Lara	1,291,670	3,200	403.64	
5	Maracay Metropolitan Area	Maracay, Cagua, Turmero, El Limón, Santa Cruz, Palo Negro, Santa Ritz	Aragua	1,249,704	832.57	1,501	
6	Ciudad Guayana	Puerto Ordaz, San Félix	Bolívar	851,071	1,612	527.95	
7	Barcelona-Puerto La Cruz Metropolitan Area	Barcelona, Puerto La Cruz, Lechería, Guanta	Anzóategui	801,071	2,029	394.81	
7	Barcelona	Simón Bolívar Municipality	Anzóategui	465,989	1,706	273.14	
7	Puerto La Cruz	Sotillo Municipality	Anzóategui	272,231	244	1,115.70	
7	Lechería	Diego Bautista Urbaneja Municipality	Anzóategui	29,767	12	2,480.58	
7	Guanta	Guanta Municipality	Anzóategui	33,835	67	505	
8	Costa Oriental del Lago	Cabimas, Ciudad Ojeda, Lagunillas, Los Puertos de Altagracia,	Zulia	758,957	8,251	91.98	
8	-	Cabimas	Zulia	280,171	604	463.85	
8	-	Ciudad Ojeda-El Danto-Tía Juana-Lagunillas	Zulia	261,404	1,233	212	
8	-	Los Puertos de Altagracia-Sabaneta de Palmas	Zulia	76,243	1,966	38.78	
8	-	Mene Grande	Zulia	61,960	2,816	22	
8	-	Bachaquero	Zulia	48,402	1,127	42.94	
8	-	Santa Rita	Zulia	30,777	505	60.90	
9	San Cristóbal Metropolitan Area	San Cristóbal, Táriba, Palmira, Cordero, Capacho Viejo, Capacho Nuevo, San Josecito	Táchira	628,627	963	652.77	
10	Maturín	-	Monagas	472,909	(no exact data for city/urban area)	-	
11	Mérida Metropolitan Area	Mérida, Tabay, Ejido, Lagunillas	Mérida	447,269	2,636	169.67	
12	Acarigua-Araure Metropolitan Area	Acarigua, Araure	Portuguesa	393,854	1,065	369.81	
13	Ciudad Bolívar	-	Bolívar	380,953	585	65.10	
14	Cumaná	-	Sucre	374,706	598	626.59	
15	Barinas	Barinas, Barinitas	Barinas	355,413	-	-	
