= Litoral Varguense conurbation =

Conurbation in Vargas (La Guaira) State, Venezuela

Litoral Varguense (Litoral Central)
- Conurbation
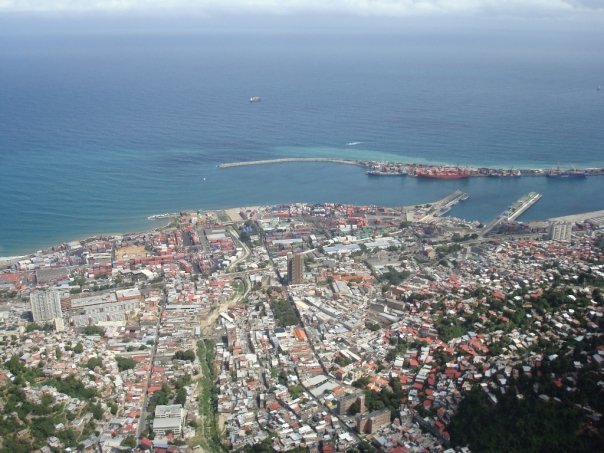
- La Guaira

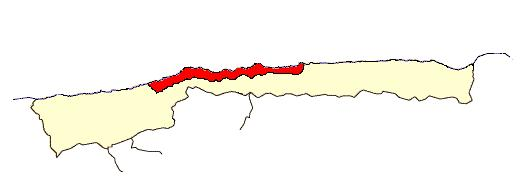
- Map of Litoral Varguense conurbation
- Country: Venezuela
- State: Vargas
- Largest Cities: Maiquetia; Catia La Mar; Carayaca; Caraballeda; La Guaira

Area
  - Metro: 942 km^{2} (364 sq mi)

Population
  - Metro: 341,325
  - Metro density: 362.34/km^{2} (938.5/sq mi)
- Time zone: UTC-4:30 (VST)

Litoral Varguense conurbation (Spanish: Conurbación del Litoral Varguense is a metropolitan area in Vargas, Venezuela, that includes 10 parishes, it is part of the Greater Caracas Area. It has a population of 341,325 inhabitants.

== Cities ==
The principal cities of the area are (2013):

1. Maiquetia (it holds the parishes of Maiquetia, Carlos Soublette and Urimare) (pop. 118,807)
2. Catia La Mar (pop. 98,487)
3. Carayaca (pop. 40,096)
4. Caraballeda (pop. 29,982)
5. La Guaira (pop. 20,228)
6. Macuto (pop. 15,562)
7. Naiguatá (pop. 14,516)

== Parishes ==
The 10 parishes of the area are:

Municipality	Area (km^{2})	Population 2013	Population density 2013 (/km^{2})
Caraballeda	67	29,982	447,49
Carayaca	475	40,096	84.41
Carlos Soublette	7	41,964	5,994.8
Catia La Mar	38	98,487	2,591.76
El Junko	20	3,647	182,35
La Guaira	14	20,228	1,444.85
Macuto	32	15,562	486.31
Maiquetia	22	34,049	1,547.68
Naiguatá	241	14,516	60.23
Urimare	26	42,794	1,645.92
Litoral Varguense conurbation	942	341,325	362.34

== Tourism ==
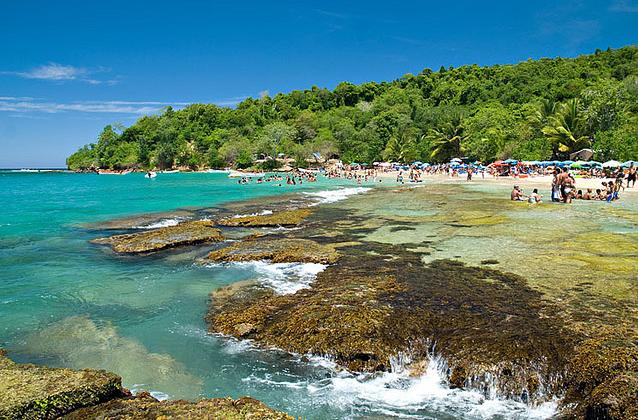
Tourism is vital to economy of the conurbation.

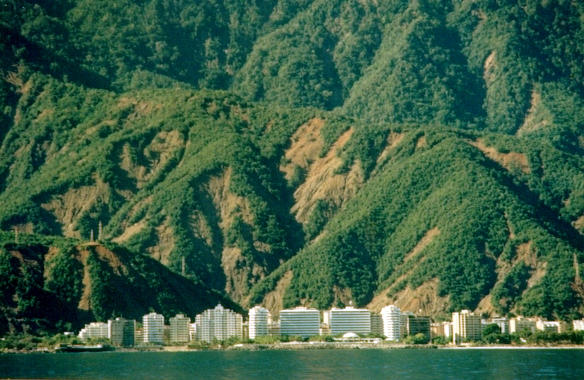
Skyline in Caraballeda.

=== Beaches ===
- Aeropuerto
- Caruao
- La Punta
- Marina Grande
- Punta Care
- Anare
- Catia La Mar
- La Sabana
- Naiguatá
- Quebrada Seca
- Arrecífe
- Chichiriviche
- La Salina
- Oricao
- San Luis
- Bahía Marina
- Chuspa
- La Zorra
- Oritapo
- Sheraton
- Bikini
- Círculo Militar
- Larga
- Osma
- Taguao
- Buchón
- El Burro
- Los ángeles
- Pantaleta
- Tarma
- Camurí Chico
- El Chorrito
- Los Caracas
- Paraíso
- Todasana
- Candileja
- El Farallón
- Los Cocos
- Puerto Carayaca
- Urama
- Caribito
- Escondida
- Macuto
- Puerto Cruz
- Verde

== See also ==
- Greater Caracas
- List of metropolitan areas of Venezuela
