= Metropolitan Region of Caracas =

Metropolitan Region of Caracas (Greater Caracas) Región Metropolitana de Caracas (Gran Caracas)
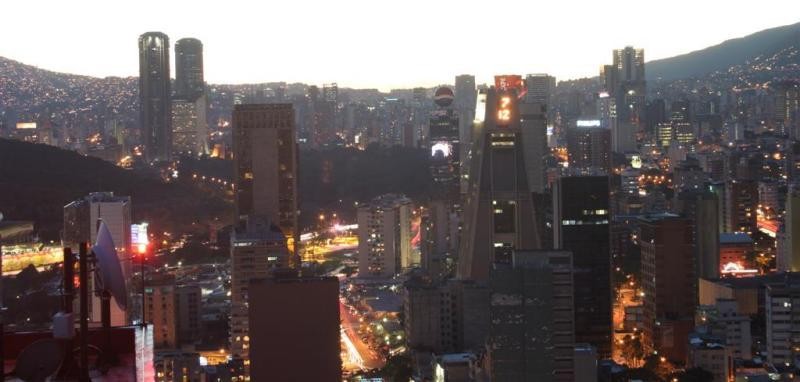
- Caracas
- Interactive map of Metropolitan Region of Caracas (Greater Caracas)
- Country: Venezuela
- State: Caracas; Miranda; Vargas
- Largest Cities: Caracas; Petare; Baruta; Los Teques; Guarenas; Guatire; Ocumare del Tuy

Area
  - Metro: 4,715.1 km^{2} (1,820.5 sq mi)
- Highest elevation: 2,200 m (7,200 ft)
- Lowest elevation: 25 m (82 ft)

Population
  - Metro: 5,297,026
  - Metro density: 1,123.41/km^{2} (2,909.6/sq mi)
- Time zone: UTC-4:30 (VST)

Metropolitan Region of Caracas (MRC) or Greater Caracas (GC) (Spanish: Región Metropolitana de Caracas; RMC or Gran Caracas; GC) is the urban agglomeration comprising the Metropolitan District of Caracas and the adjacent 11 municipalities over Miranda and Vargas state in Venezuela. Thus, it does not constitute a single administrative unit. The conurbation spreads south, west, east and north of Caracas. It has a population of 5,243,301.

== Geography ==
=== Metropolitan divisions ===
The Metropolitan Region of Caracas consists of five distinct metropolitan divisions/conurbations, subdividing the region into five divisions.

Metropolitan Divisions	2011 Census Population	Area (km^{2})	Density (pop/km^{2})	Major cities
Metropolitan District of Caracas	2,946,955	777,1 km^{2}	4212.9/km^{2}	Caracas
Valles del Tuy Metropolitan Area	754,081	1694 km^{2}	445.14/km^{2}	Ocumare del Tuy, Charallave, Santa Teresa del Tuy, Cúa
Guarenas-Guatire Metropolitan Area	473,728	558 km^{2}	848.97/km^{2}	Guatire, Guarenas
Altos Mirandinos Metropolitan Area	454,929	744 km^{2}	611.46/km^{2}	Los Teques, San Antonio de Los Altos
Litoral Varguense conurbation	341,325	942 km^{2}	362.34/km^{2}	La Guaira, Maiquetia, Catia La Mar, Caraballeda
Metropolitan Region of Caracas (MRC)	4,832,026	4715.1 km^{2}	1,223.41/km^{2}	

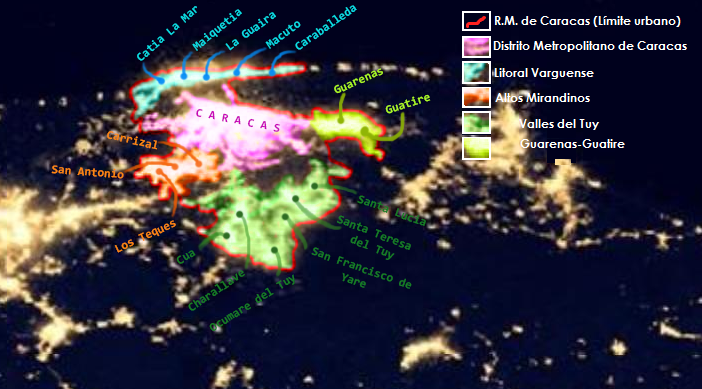
Satellite image of the Metropolitan Region of Caracas and its conurbations at night and its conurbations
