= Flag of La Guaira =

Venezuelan state flag

Flag of La Guaira

La Guaira in Venezuela

The flag of La Guaira, one of the 23 states of Venezuela, has six stripes – two horizontal (white, blue) on the hoist side, and four vertical (yellow, red, white, blue). The blue horizontal stripe is a third of the height of the white horizontal stripe. In the centre of the white horizontal stripe there is a symbol of a glowing sun with a humanized face, whilst in the blue horizontal stripe there are four white five-pointed stars.

== Gual and España conspiracy ==
The design of the La Guaira state flag is based on a flag designed by Manuel Gual and sewn by hand by Josefa Joaquina Sánchez. In 1797 Gual and the husband of Sánchez, José María España, were preparing to organize a revolt in La Guaira against Spanish colonial rule in Venezuela. Preparing for a struggle for independence Gual designed a quadricolour flag and composed a hymn inspired by the Marseillaise. But the plot was revealed to the Spanish authorities, and on the night of July 13, 1797 the Gual residence was raided. At the house the Spanish forces discovered the quadricolour flag and found documents authored by Gual, including a letter to a friend, outlining the symbolism of the flag. The quadricolour flag from the Gual and España conspiracy was the earliest flag design of the Venezuelan movement for independence.

== Symbolism ==
Gual intended for the four colours of the flag to represent the four races of Venezuela – Indians, blacks, pardos (browns) and whites. The four white stars reflect the union of the four provinces that would become independent - Caracas, Province of Cumaná, Guyana and Maracaibo. The sun would represents the wisdom which all republicans should have in order to act in just manner and the equality that should prevail (in the sense that the rays of the sun shines on all humans alike). Moreover, it was to intended symbolize the ideals of liberty, equality, property and security.

== Adoption as state flag ==
The flag of Gual and España was adopted as the flag of the Vargas municipality in 1997, in connection with the bicentennial commemorations of the Gual and España conspiracy. It became the state flag after the Vargas municipality was awarded statehood in 1998. In 2019 the name of Vargas state was changed to La Guaira state.
