= Bartolomé Mata Vásquez =

Venezuelan politician (born 1923)

Bartolomé Mata Vásquez is a Venezuelan lawyer, writer, public official and politician.

He was born in Juan Griego on April 4, 1923. He was the son of José Asunción Mata Doumolín and Blasina Vásquez. He attended primary school in the Litoral Varguense, and secondary school in Caracas and La Asunción. He obtained a Law Degree from the Central University of Venezuela in 1947, and then went on to study Mercantile Law and Management in the United States. He would go on to obtain a doctorate in Political Science from UCV. Mata Vásquez married Magdalena Villalba on March 12, 1948. The couple would have eight children.

Mata Vásquez rose to political prominence during the rule of Marcos Pérez Jiménez. In October 1949 Mata Vásquez was named Secretary of Government of the state of Nueva Esparta in the administration of the Governor Heraclio Narváez Alfonzo. He represented Nueva Esparta in the National Congress. In the 1952 Venezuelan Constituent Assembly election, Mata Vásquez was elected as the sole delegate from the Federal Territory of Delta Amacuro. Mata Vásquez served as interim governor of Portuguesa between December 10, 1952 and January 3, 1953. He founded and served as the director of the weekly newspaper El Insular.

Mata Vásquez settled in Caracas. He served as Deputy Political Director of the Ministry of Internal Relations and as First Vice President of the Lawyers' College of Venezuela.

Mata Vásquez held a number of posts in the Catholic establishment in Venezuela. As of 1985 he was part of the Economic Affairs Council of the church. As of the 1980s and 1990s he worked as the Administrative Manager of INPRECLERO. In 1990, as the Legal Advisor of the Episcopal Conference of Venezuela, he petitioned Empresas Polar to begin to produce a Venezuelan sacramental wine. He served as Member of the International Board of Serra International.

His written works include Luisa Cáceres de Arismendi: heroína, patriota y mártir, Patria Venezolana, Validez de una Letra de Cambio, Matasiete no fue una batalla, Derecho hogareño and Rubí.
