= Guarenas-Guatire conurbation =

Guarenas-Guatire conurbation (Guarenas-Guatire Metropolitan Area) Conurbación Guarenas-Guatire Area Metropolitana de Guarenas-Guatire
- Conurbation
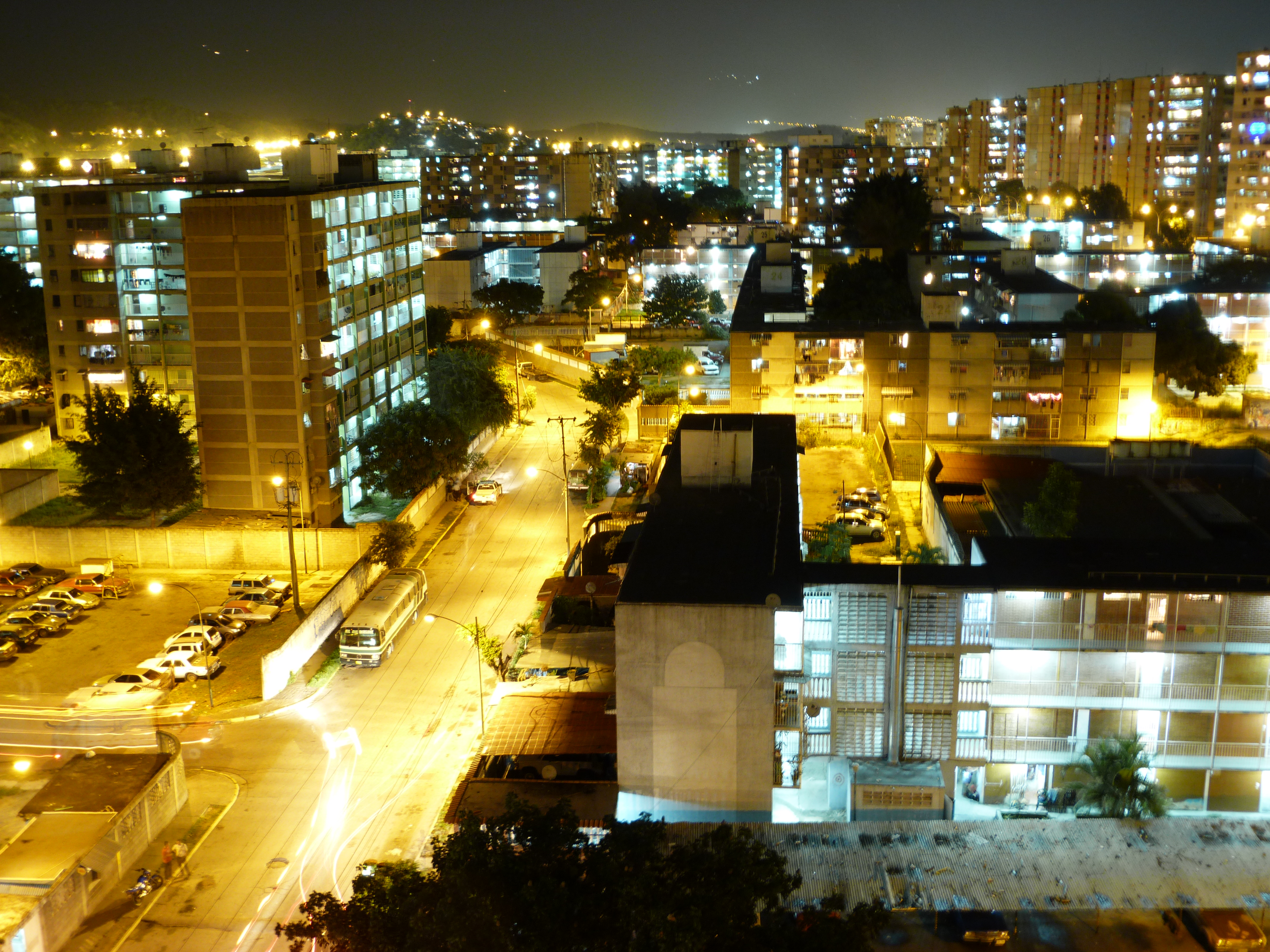
- 27 de Febrero neighborhood in Guarenas
- Country: Venezuela
- State: Miranda
- Largest Cities: Guarenas; Guatire

Area
  - Metro: 558 km^{2} (215 sq mi)

Population
  - Metro: 488,000
  - Metro density: 848.97/km^{2} (2,198.8/sq mi)
- Time zone: UTC-4:30 (VST)

Guarenas-Guatire conurbation or Guarenas-Guatire metropolitan area (Spanish: Conurbación Guarenas-Guatire or Area Metropolitana de Guarenas-Guatire), also known as El Nuevo Este de Caracas (New East of Caracas), is a conurbation area in Miranda, Venezuela, that includes 2 municipalities, it is part of the Greater Caracas Area. It has a population of approximately 488,000 inhabitants.

== Cities ==
The principal cities of the area are (2013):

1. Guarenas (pop. 264,290)
2. Guatire (pop. 159,725)
3. Araira (pop. 49,713)

== Municipalities ==
The 2 municipalities of the area are:

Municipality	Area (km^{2})	Population 2013	Population density 2013 (/km^{2})
Plaza	180	264,290	1,468.27
Zamora	378	209,438	554.06
Guarenas-Guatire conurbation	558	473,728	848.97

== Transportation ==
The Guarenas / Guatire Metro is a dual subway / light rail system project to connect the twin cities and intermediate communities to Caracas.

== See also ==
- Greater Caracas
- List of metropolitan areas of Venezuela
