= Naiguatá =

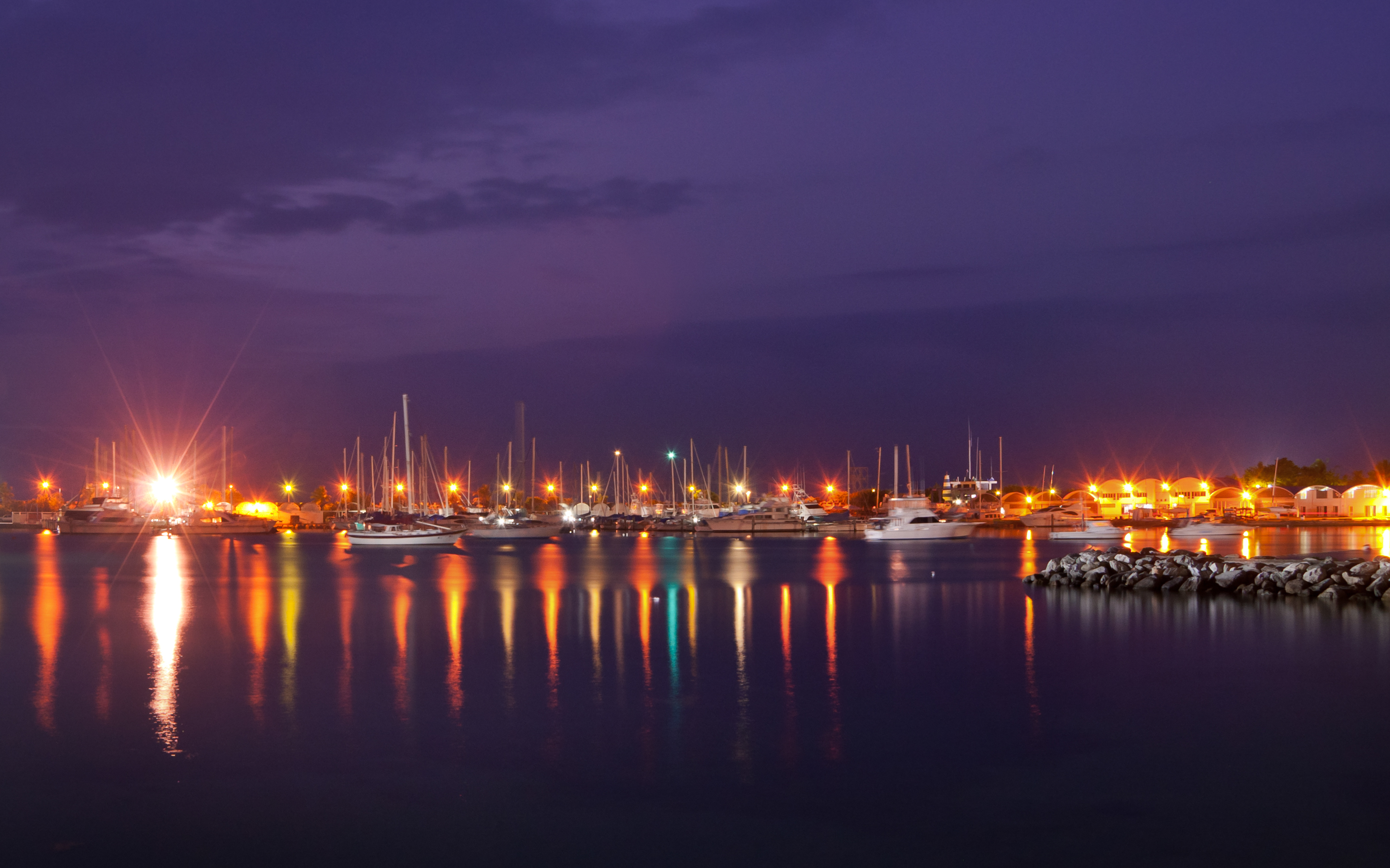

- Location within Venezuela
- Coordinates: 10°37′N 66°44′W
- Country: Venezuela
- State: Vargas
- Municipality: Vargas

Area
  - Total: 241 km^{2} (93 sq mi)

Population (2013)
  - Total: 14,516
- Time zone: VST
- Climate: BSh

Naiguatá is a city located in Vargas, Venezuela. It is part of the Litoral Varguense conurbation.
