= Barcelona-Puerto La Cruz =

Greater Barcelona (Barcelona-Puerto La Cruz Metropolitan Area) Gran Barcelona Area Metropolitana de Barcelona-Puerto La Cruz
- Conurbation
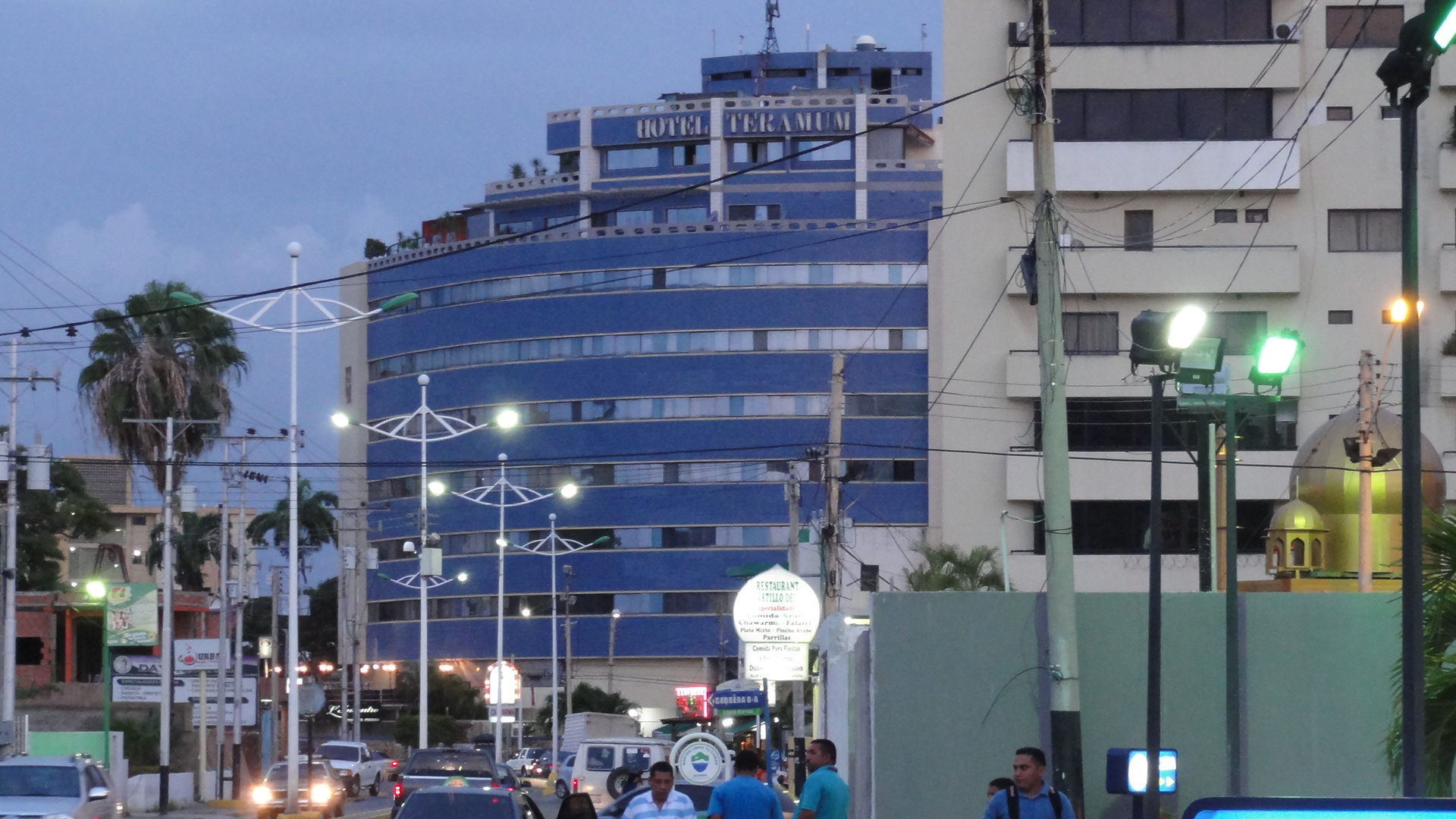
- Lechería Downtown
- Interactive map of Greater Barcelona (Barcelona-Puerto La Cruz Metropolitan Area)
- Country: Venezuela
- State: Anzoátegui
- Largest Cities: Barcelona; Puerto La Cruz; Lechería; Guanta

Area
  - Metro: 2,029 km^{2} (783 sq mi)

Population
  - Metro: 801,071
  - Metro density: 394.81/km^{2} (1,022.6/sq mi)
- Time zone: UTC−4 (VET)

The Barcelona-Puerto La Cruz Metropolitan Area, better known as Greater Barcelona, is a Venezuelan conurbation formed by the localities of Barcelona (capital of the Anzoátegui State), Puerto La Cruz, Guanta and Lecheria, forming one of the largest metropolitan areas of the country. Although the state's public powers are in Barcelona, its economic, social and political activities exceed its geographical limits without forming a formally established political division. It has a population of 801,071 inhabitants, being the biggest urban agglomeration in the North-Eastern Region, and the 7th in Venezuela.

== See also ==
- List of metropolitan areas of Venezuela
