= Josefa Joaquina Sánchez =

Venezuelan revolutionary (1765–1813)

Josefa Joaquina Sánchez Bastidas
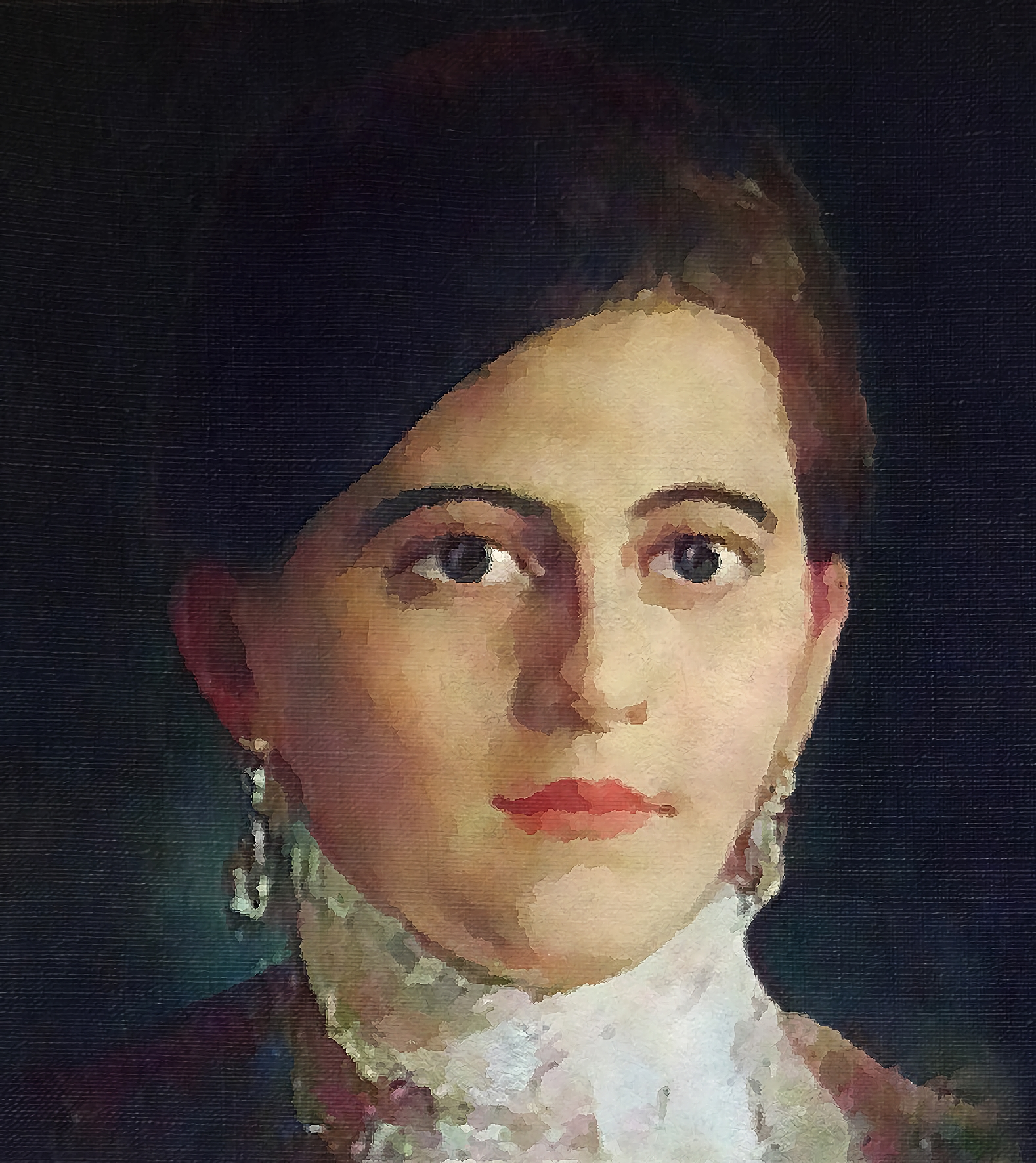
- Born: October 18, 1765; La Guaira, Venezuela
- Died: 1813 (47 years); Cumaná, Venezuela
- Known for: Embroiderer of the first flag of Venezuela, heroine of the Venezuelan War of Independence
- Spouse: José María España

Josefa Joaquina Sánchez Bastidas (La Guaira, 18 October 1765 – Cumaná, 1813) was a Venezuelan woman who participated in the Gual and España conspiracy organized by her husband, the Venezuelan military officer José María España. She is primarily remembered for promoting the conspiracy and for creating the flag of the revolutionary movement, which has led her to be considered the "embroiderer of the first flag of Venezuela".

== Biography ==
Josefa Joaquina Sánchez was born on October 18, 1765 in the port of La Guaira, Venezuela, daughter of Joaquín Sánchez and Juana Bastidas.

On July 27, 1783, she married the Venezuelan military officer José María España , with whom she had nine children, one of whom died while in prison. Along with her husband, she became involved in the Gual and España Conspiracy, which aimed to incite the Venezuelan population to take up arms and liberate themselves from Spanish rule. Sánchez was responsible for copying the revolutionary movement's documents and making the flags that the revolutionaries would use. For this reason, she is considered the "embroiderer of the first flag of Venezuela ."

On May 8, 1799, her husband was murdered by Spanish authorities, who hanged his body as a warning to other conspirators. Days earlier, Sánchez had been interrogated by Venezuelan officials regarding Spain, after a black slave named Rafael España betrayed them.

After her husband's death, she was arrested and taken to Caracas, where months later she received her prison sentence of eight years, which she would serve in the Casa Hospicio de Caracas. However, in 1808, at the end of her sentence, she was banished from Cumaná along with her children. Once the Venezuelan independence process began, she returned to Venezuela and applied for a pension from the government. She died in 1813.
