= La Guaira (state) =

- State of Venezuela
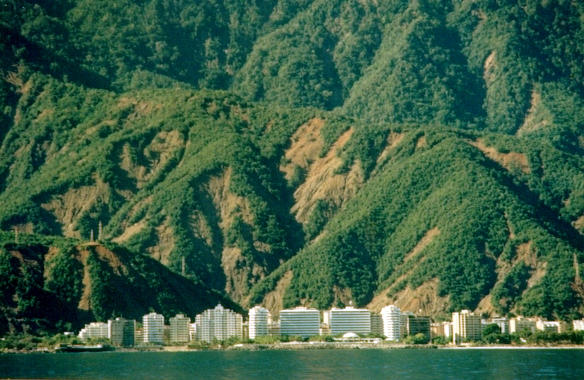

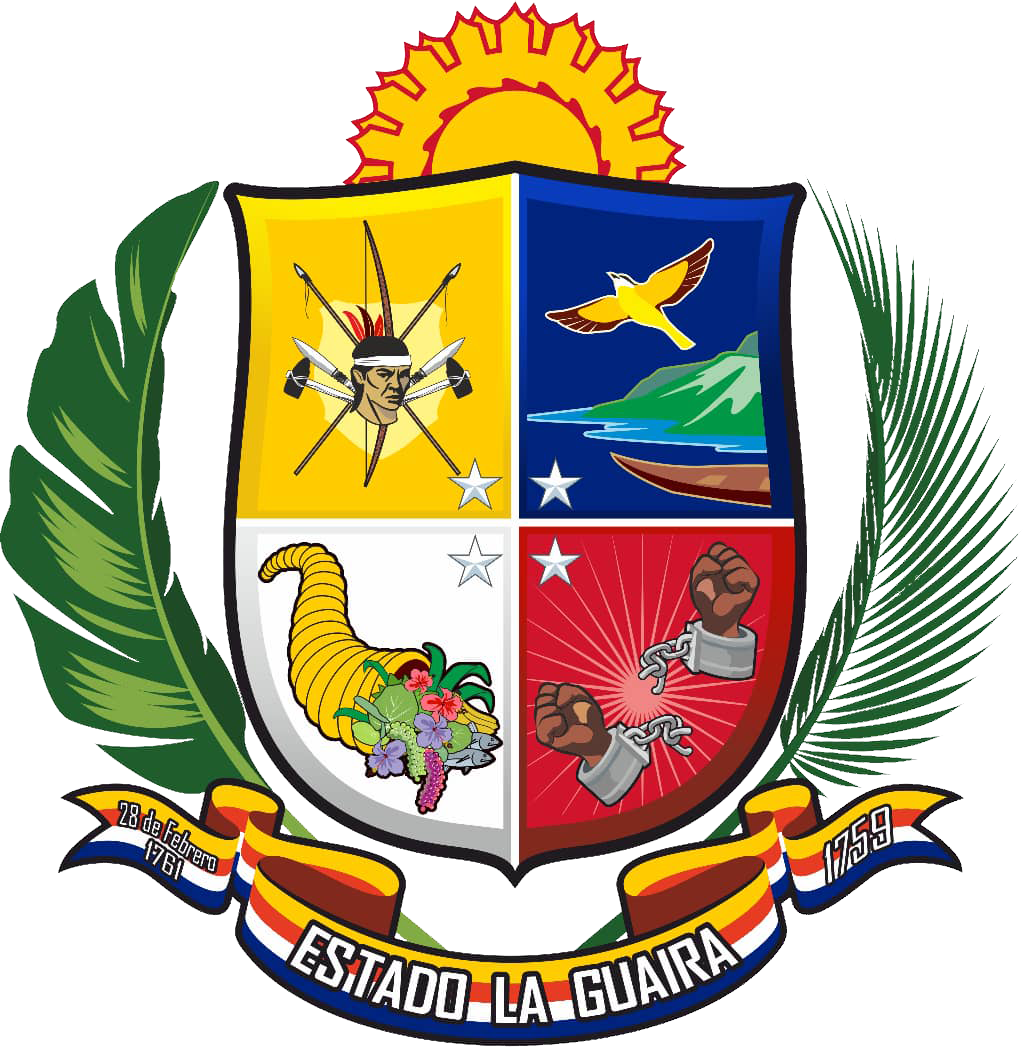
- Flag Coat of arms
- Motto: Igualdad, Libertad, Prosperidad y Seguridad (English: Equality, Liberty, Prosperity and Security)
- Anthem: Carmañola Americana
- Location within Venezuela
- Coordinates: 10.572°N 66.88°W
- Country: Venezuela
- Created: 1998
- Capital: La Guaira

Government
  - Body: Legislative Council
  - Governor: José Alejandro Terán

Area
  - Total: 1,172 km^{2} (453 sq mi)
  - Rank: 22nd
- 0.16% of Venezuela

Population (2011 census)
  - Total: 352,920
  - Rank: 21st
- 1.29% of Venezuela
- Demonym: guaireño
- Time zone: UTC−4 (VET)
- ISO 3166 code: VE-X
- Emblematic tree: Uva de Playa (Coccoloba uvífera)
- HDI (2019): 0.732 high · 5th of 24
- Website: www.estadovargas.gob.ve

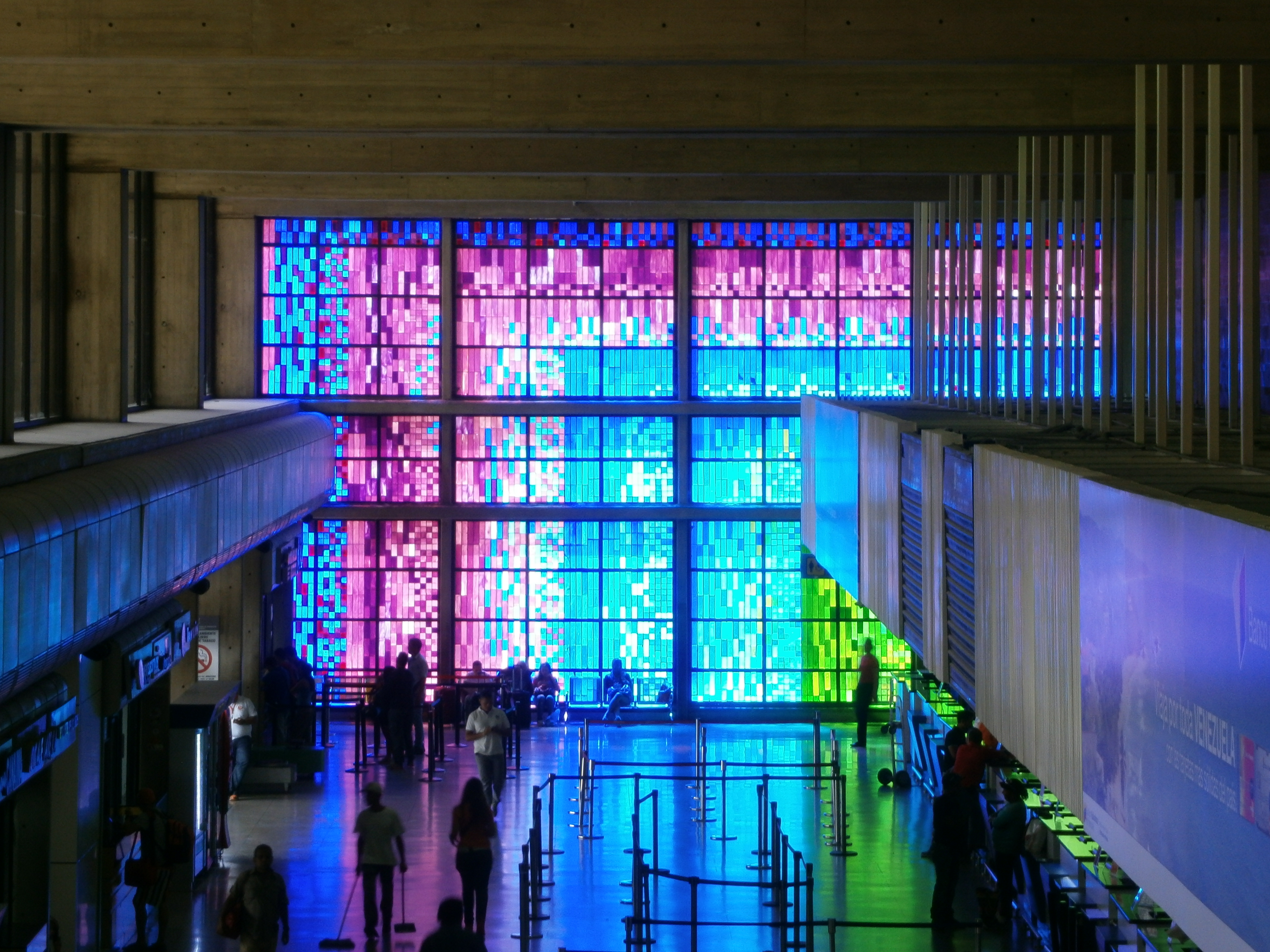
Simón Bolívar International Airport, La Guaira State

La Guaira, known until 2019 as Vargas (Spanish: [βaɾɣas]), is one of the 23 states of Venezuela.

Formerly named after Venezuela's first civilian president, José María Vargas, the state comprises a coastal region in the north of Venezuela, bordering Aragua to the west, Miranda to the east, the Caribbean Sea to the north and the Capital District to the south. It is home to both the country's largest seaport and airport. The state capital and largest city is La Guaira followed by Catia La Mar and Maiquetía. The Litoral Varguense conurbation is the principal urban agglomeration in the state, which is part of the Greater Caracas Area.

In 1999, the geographic center of the state suffered major floods and landslides, known as La Tragedia de Vargas (the Vargas tragedy), causing major losses of life and property, and resulting in forced population movements, including the virtual disappearance of some small towns. Thousands died, and many more fled the area to other states. The state's name was changed on 14 June 2019 to La Guaira.

On 24 June 2026, two large earthquakes devastated the state, with reports indicating that up to 80% of all structures in the state had collapsed.

== History ==
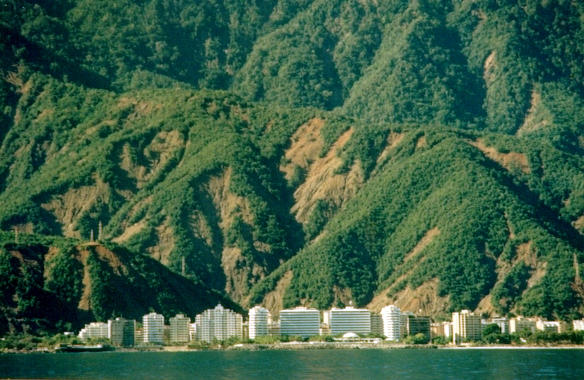
A section of the La Guaira state after the 1999 Tragedy - notice the scars in the mountains due to the mudslides.

=== Origin ===
It was the Arauaco natives who first inhabited the central coast and then the western part of Venezuela. However, 500 years before the arrival of Christopher Columbus, they were displaced, in some places by the Caribs, settled on these coasts. The state of La Guaira later became the great Tarma nation, extended between Puerto Maya and the Valles del Tuy, populated by natives, who spoke a Cariban language.

=== Spanish colonization ===
A mestizo Guaiquerí, Francisco Fajardo, arrived in 1555 and founded La Villa del Rosario. The outrages committed against the aborigines by the Spaniards who accompanied him made his attempt at peaceful conquest fail. As a consequence of this, the aboriginal congress held in the Uveros de Macuto and called by the chief Guaicamacuto, sought to expel Francisco Fajardo from the occupied territory, showing signs of primitive sessions of republican democracy.

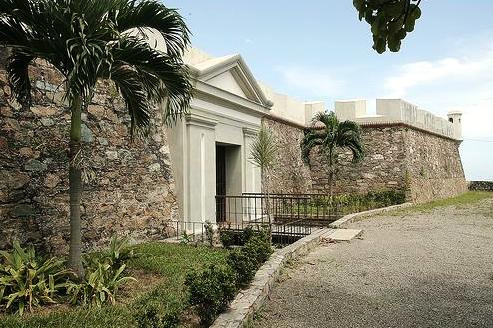
Fuerte El Vigía built by the Spanish at the beginning of the 18th century

=== Territorial history ===
This political-territorial region has suffered important changes over the years. Its territory (Aguado and Vargas) was part of the province of Caracas, during the whole colonial period.

According to the decree of March 9, 1864, by Marshal Juan Crisóstomo Falcón, the organization of the Federal District is established in the following terms: "Article 2.- The Federal District, whose capital is Caracas, is made up of the former cantons of Caracas, La Guaira and Maiquetía, which will form Departments under the names of "El Libertador", "Vargas" and "Aguado", with Caracas, La Guaira and Maiquetía as their respective capitals. Their limits, those indicated by the law of April 28, 1856, on territorial division". In 1868, Vargas became part, together with the Libertador Department, of the State of Bolivar (current territory of the State of Miranda, Capital District and State of La Guaira together). In 1879, through the agreement of April 30, the twenty states of the Union (of the United States of Venezuela) were reduced to seven large states, the reduction being governed by the Law of April 28, 1856, which established the last sectional demarcation, by which the State of the center is created, composed of Bolivar, Guzmán Blanco, Guárico, Apure and Nueva Esparta, becoming, on April 27, 1881, the "State Guzmán Blanco" composed only of Bolivar, Aragua, Guárico, Nueva Esparta and the department Vargas of the Federal District. In 1889, a year after Antonio Guzmán Blanco left power definitively, it was decided in a new territorial reorganization, to rename the Guzmán Blanco State with the name of "Estado Miranda", excluding from this new arrangement what was the province of Aragua.

In 1909 both Vargas and Aguado were incorporated into Federal District. In 1936 Aguado and Vargas merged into one Department: Vargas. Until 1987, it kept the name and conditions of department, when by decree of 1986 it became Vargas Municipality.

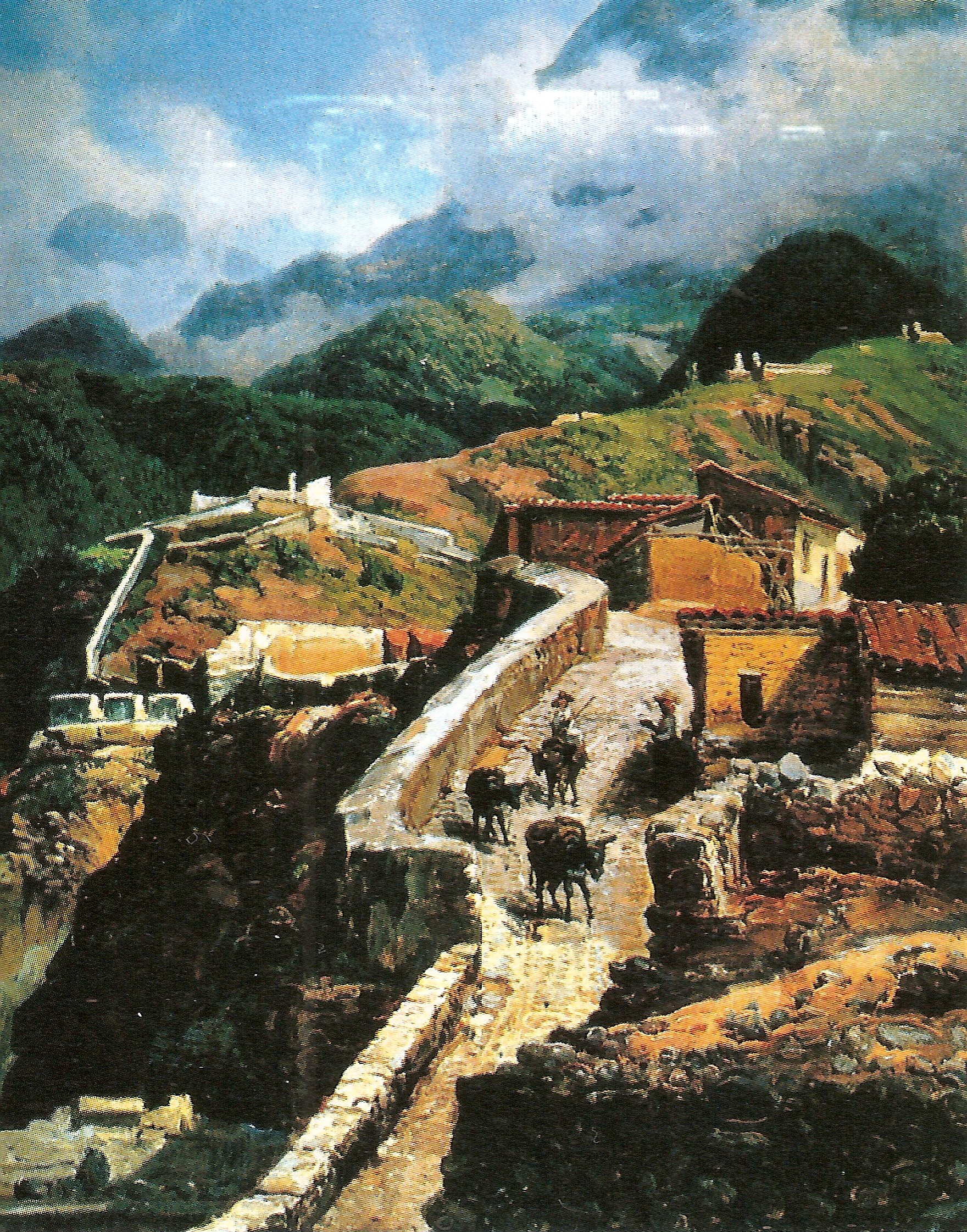
Oil painting of La Guaira City between 1842 and 1845 by Ferdinand Bellermann

In the 1990s, the autonomist demands that desired the state of La Guaira as a territory differentiated from the Federal District politically and economically increased. In 1998, the government of Rafael Caldera decreed the municipality of Vargas as autonomous, separate from the Federal District, with the status of Federal Territory, and shortly thereafter it definitively became the 23rd state in the nation. The creation of the state of La Guaira has motivated the appearance of new autonomist movements in other regions of the country, as in the case of the municipality Páez in the state of Apure, which has more geographical aspects similar to Táchira than to the rest of Apure. In the past, the state of La Guaira has sought to have the jurisdiction of the Archipelago of Los Roques totally transferred to the state. There are also proposals to subdivide the state into 2 or 3 municipalities, which currently only has a single municipal entity.

=== Recent history ===
This region of Venezuela has undergone important changes over the years, and while the geographical borders have remained, the territorial delineation has varied. The area was previously one of the departments of the Venezuela's Federal District (the other being the Libertador department, now Libertador Municipality), and the governor of this region was chosen by the national government. The area later evolved into a municipality, but was still dependent on the governor of the Federal District. In the 1990s there were increased calls for Vargas to become a separate entity, distinct from Federal District. In 1998 the government of Rafael Caldera decreed Vargas as an independent municipality, separate from the Federal District, with the statute of Federal Territory. Shortly after it became the 23rd state of Venezuela.

In mid-December 1999, after several days of ever-increasing rains pouring over the Cordillera de la Costa Central and the piedmont within the span of 24 hours along the coastline for about 45 km (28 mi), the state suffered from massive floods which resulted in severe losses of life and property. In its wake as of December 16, the surviving population witnessed the massive destruction of most of the state infrastructure, including the collapse of most roads, bridges, housings, public and private buildings, and of basic services as electricity and communications; in which thousands were killed or missing. Official estimates some 50,000 dead or missing, but the real figure may be much higher. In the following weeks nearly the entire state's population was displaced. Locals refer to the December 1999 disaster as "La Tragedia de Vargas" (the Vargas Tragedy). Such climatic phenomenon (of extraordinarily high rainfall levels) appears to be periodical, having a cycle of about 70 years, and probably has occurred hundreds, perhaps thousands of times since the distant past.

On June 24, 2026, at 18:04 VET, two major earthquakes of magnitude 7.2 and 7.5, occurred just 39 seconds apart in northern Venezuela. La Guaira State is thought to have sustained the worst loss of life and damage to buildings and infrastructure in the region. The pair of earthquakes killed at least 5,300 people and injured 11,200 more.

== Geography ==
The state of La Guaira is located in the coastal-mountain region, north of the state of Miranda and the capital district. Previously, La Guaira belonged to the federal district, but since 1998, this municipality has been elevated to a state.

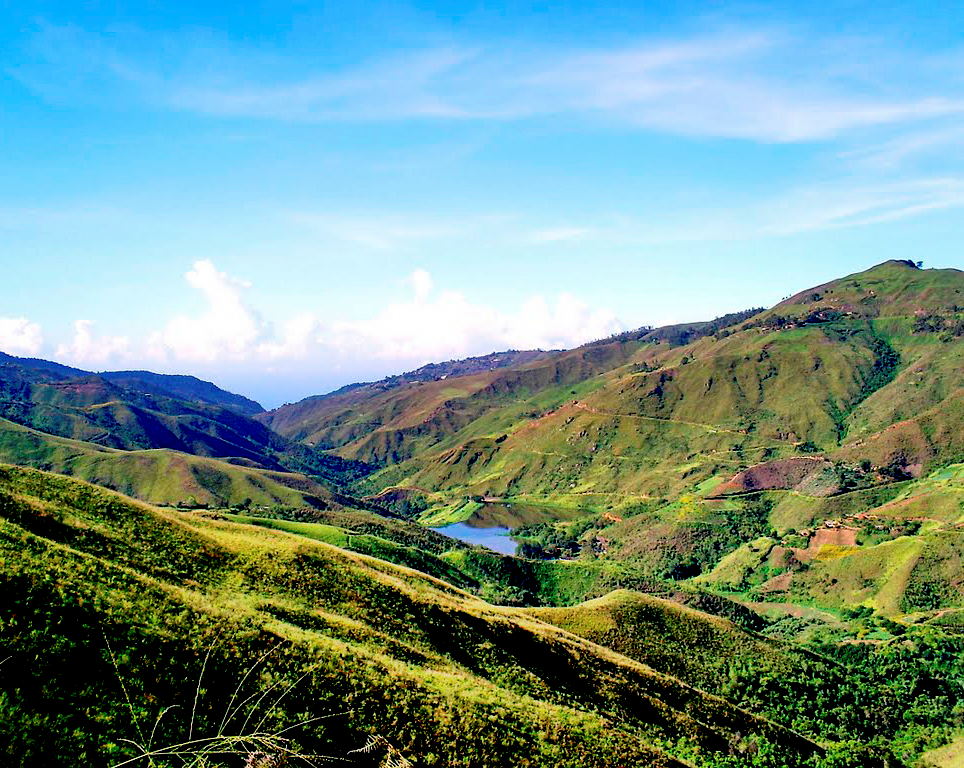
Carayaca Parish, La Guaira State

This state has only one municipality, the municipality of Vargas, which is divided into eleven parishes. The state government and the municipality's mayor's office are in the same jurisdiction.

The space comprised by the Vargas state is generally elongated, presenting its maximum amplitude in the extreme west towards Carayaca, to then reduce considerably in the center, around the urban centers of Maiquetía and Macuto. From La Guaira it begins to expand again in an almost symmetrical way up to its eastern limit. The state has an area of 1,497 square kilometers (0.13% of the national territory); in fact, it is the second state with the smallest territorial area in the country and represents 12.28% of the capital region. The entity has the following limits: to the north with the Caribbean Sea, to the south with the state of Miranda in the extreme southeast, the Capital District in the central sector and the state of Aragua in the extreme southwest; to the east with the state Miranda (the Chuspa River is the natural border), and to the west with the state of Aragua (Moralera Creek and the Maya River define the boundary with this state).

=== Geopolitical division ===
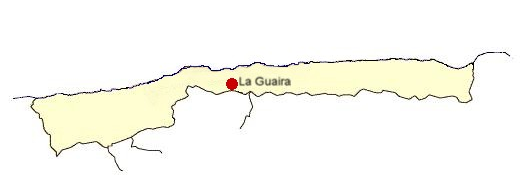
La Guaira state map

La Guaira state covers a total surface area of 1,497 km^{2} (578 sq mi).

=== Municipality ===
1. Vargas (La Guaira)

=== Parishes ===
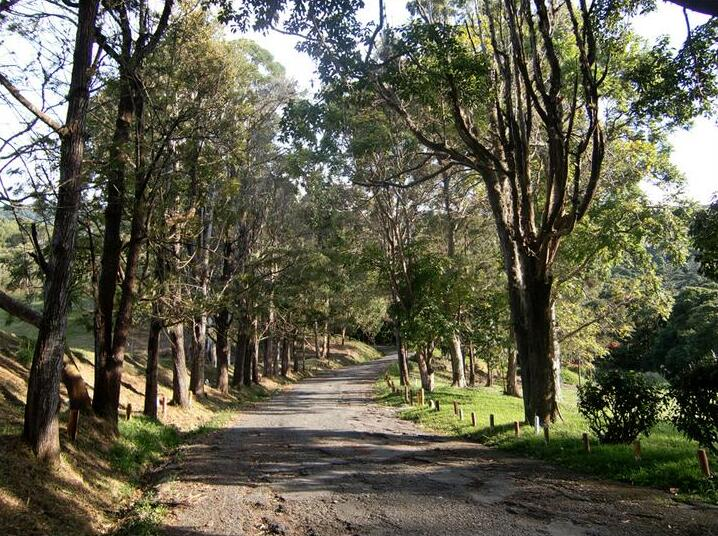
El Junko Parish, La Guaira State

- Caraballeda
- Carayaca
- Carlos Soublette (Maiquetía)
- Caruao (La Sabana)
- Catia La Mar
- El Junko
- La Guaira
- Macuto
- Maiquetía
- Naiguatá

=== Climate ===
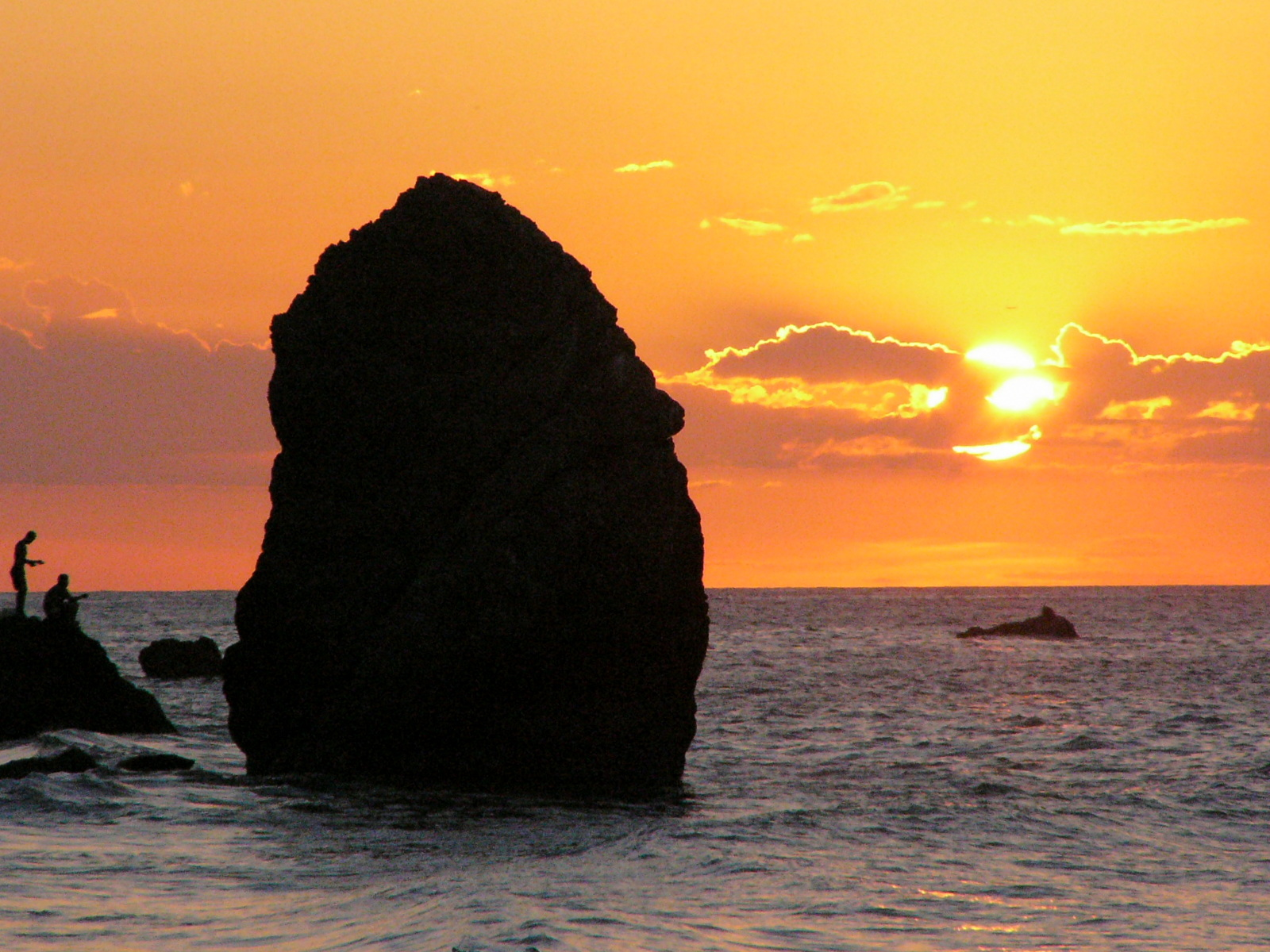
Sunset in Los Caracas, La Guaira State

The climate of the state is a factor that generates strong territorial contrasts, since it varies according to the altitudinal levels. In general, the climate is arid tropical, in the high zones of Galipán, Carayaca and El Junko it is temperate tropical due to the altitude, the humid tropical climate with little rain is characterized in the rest of the territory. In the areas below 400 m.a.s.l., high temperatures predominate presenting an average of 26.1 °C with infrequent rainfall. From this level, temperatures are more moderate, with an annual average of 14.7 °C and more frequent and intense rainfall. The average annual temperature of La Guaira is 28 °C, with scarce daily and annual thermal amplitudes.23

Thus, for the different altitudes in the region, the following characteristics are found for the different altitudinal floors, such as

1.Tropical: It presents an altitude that varies between 0 and 600 m.a.s.l. with an annual average temperature of 25.4 and 26.1 °C. In these climates they have registered average values of precipitation in the following spaces:

- Puerto Maya - Arrecife (600 mm/year).
- Mamo (325 mm/year).
- Maiquetía - Anare (600–800 mm/year).
- Los Caracas - La Sabana (1100 – 1500 mm/year).
- Caruao - Chuspa (1800mm/year).

2. Low Pre-Mountain and High Pre-Mountain: It presents an altitude that varies between 600 and 1600 m.a.s.l. with an annual average temperature of 18 and 24 °C. In these climates they have registered average values of precipitation in:

- Carayaca - Petaquire (850 – 900 mm/year)

3. Low Mountain: It presents an altitude that varies between 1600 and 2400 m.s.n.m.

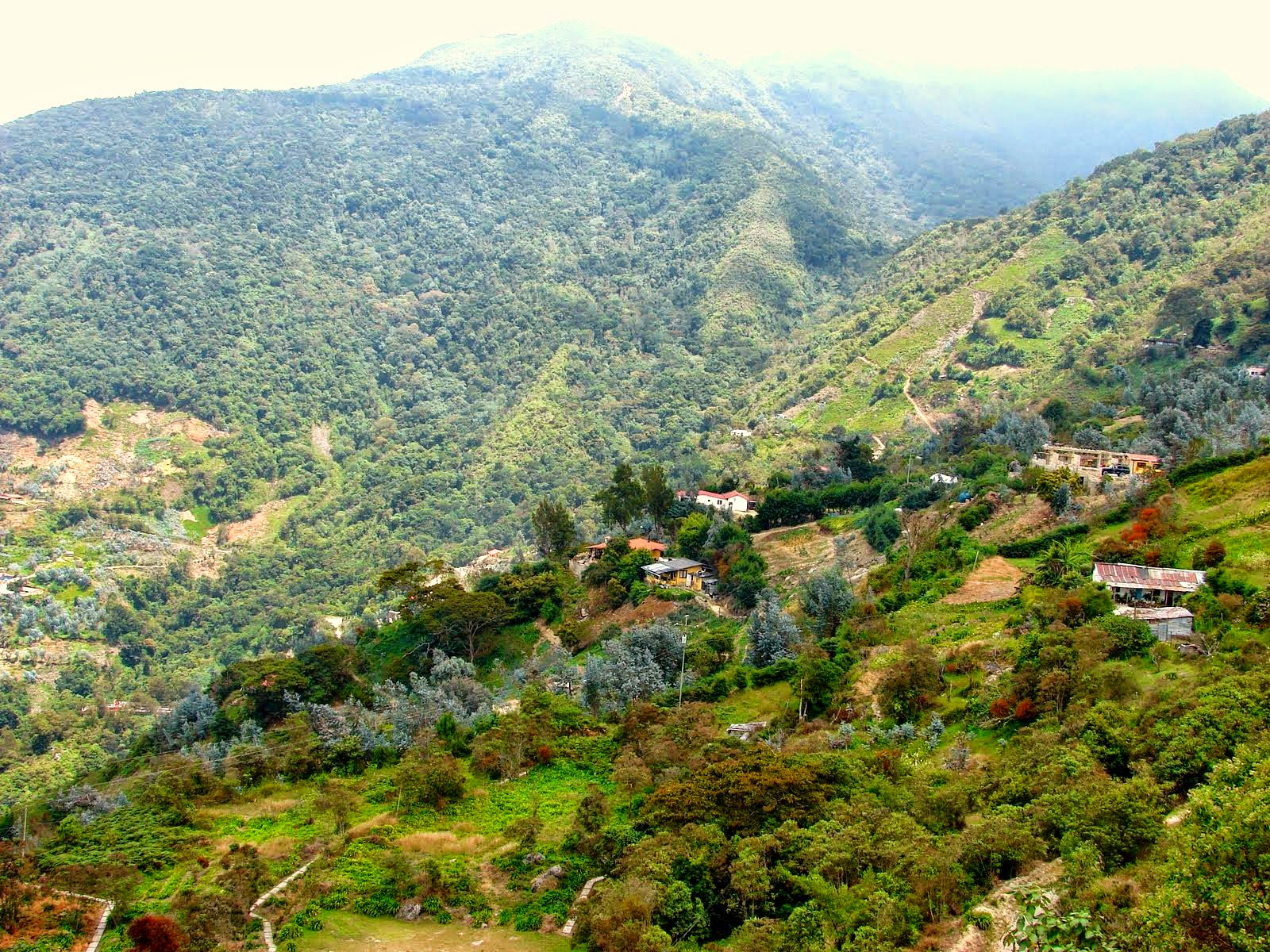
Galipan, La Guaira State

==== Precipitation ====
From the data of monthly average precipitation for a group of representative meteorological stations of the Vargas state, there is a predominance of wet months almost all year round, except for December to March. The seasons with the highest average monthly rainfall records are Caruao and El Portachuelo, where the wet weight is equal to or greater than 10 months. In the coastal plain and foothills, average monthly rainfall records are low throughout the year, with the Mamo season recording the driest period from January to March.

==== Temperatures ====
The analysis of the geographical distribution of the annual average temperature is carried out based on the stations with available records, being these the ones located in the coastal area. For the mountainous zone, we adapted the equation of correlation between the average temperature of an area in degrees Celsius and the height above sea level. of the sea, according to the equation: Average 27.6 °C (average level 0.6) / 100.

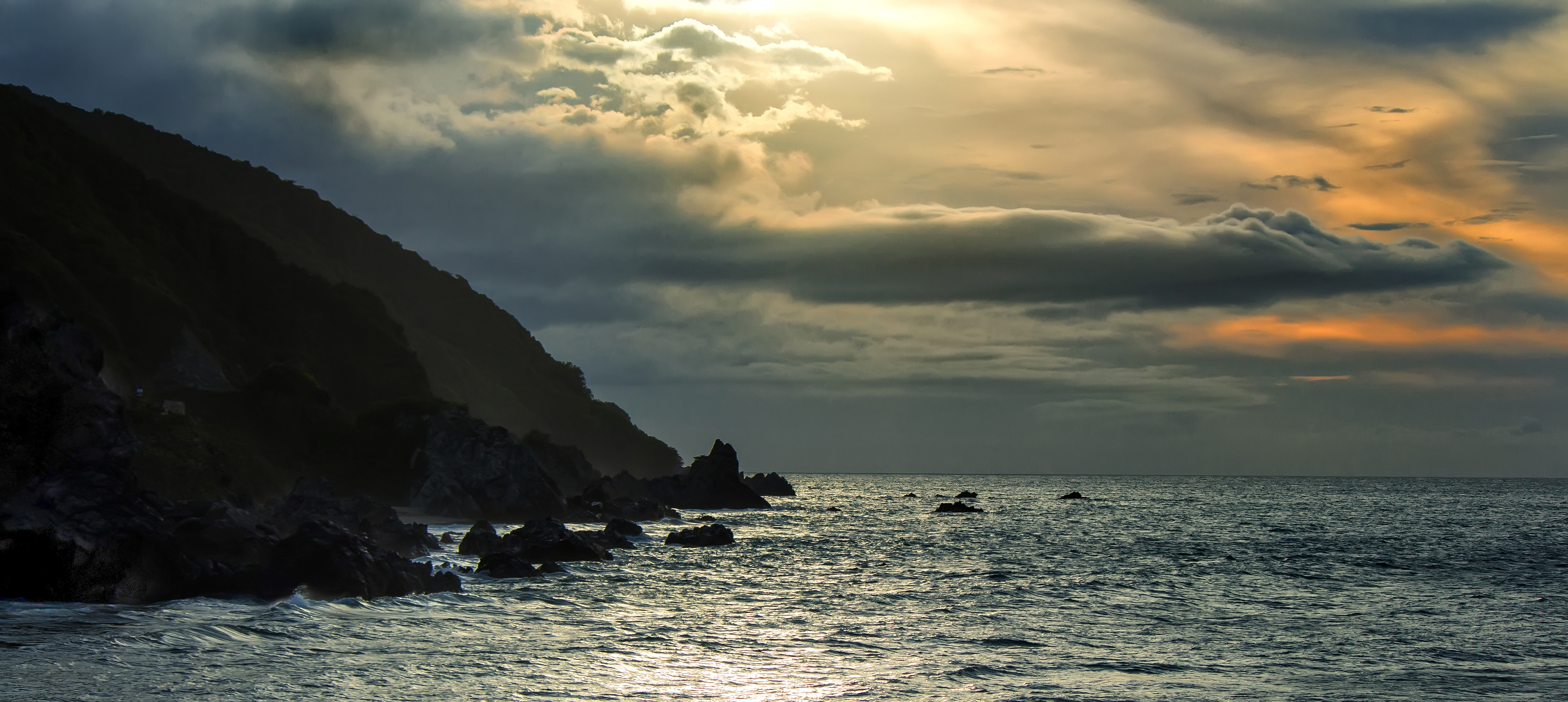
State Coast

==== Zones ====
From the recorded and estimated values, three clearly defined zones are interpreted: a coastal zone with high annual average temperatures, which range from 25.4 °C to 26.1 °C. An intermediate mountainous zone (from 972 meters above sea level to 1300 meters above sea level), which presents temperatures ranging from 18.4 °C to 21.2 °C; and another higher mountainous zone with heights between 1787 meters above sea level and 2101 meters above sea level, where relatively low temperatures of 13.9 °C are registered in Alto de Ño León and 15.8 °C in the next high station of Colonia Tovar, located in the state of Aragua.

=== Relief ===
The state consists almost entirely of coastlines as it faces the Caribbean Sea, but in the south of the state, is the Avila hill, icon of the state and Caracas, of the Cordillera de la Costa with peaks that exceed 2,000 m as Naiguatá Peak (2,765 m asl). It is home to Galipán, the highest population in La Guaira State, (partly because there is another part of Caracas and another part of Miranda State).

=== Geology ===
It corresponds to the one developed in the Coastal Range. It has as a geological limit the La Victoria Fault, where the rocks of the Gran Caracas group outcrop, on the igneous-metamorphic basement of the Sebastopol Complex of the lower Paleozoic, which is constituted by gneissic granite and chlorite schist. The formations are also located: Peña de Mora belonging to the Mesozoic, the Todasana Magmatic Complex of the upper Cretaceous, the Las Pailas formation of the late Pliocene, and the Abyssinian formation, composed of marine sediments.

=== Hydrography ===
The state is a kind of terminal for the rivers of Caracas and other populations because several rivers in the state flow into the Caribbean Sea, almost all of them are ravines of the Avila Hill.

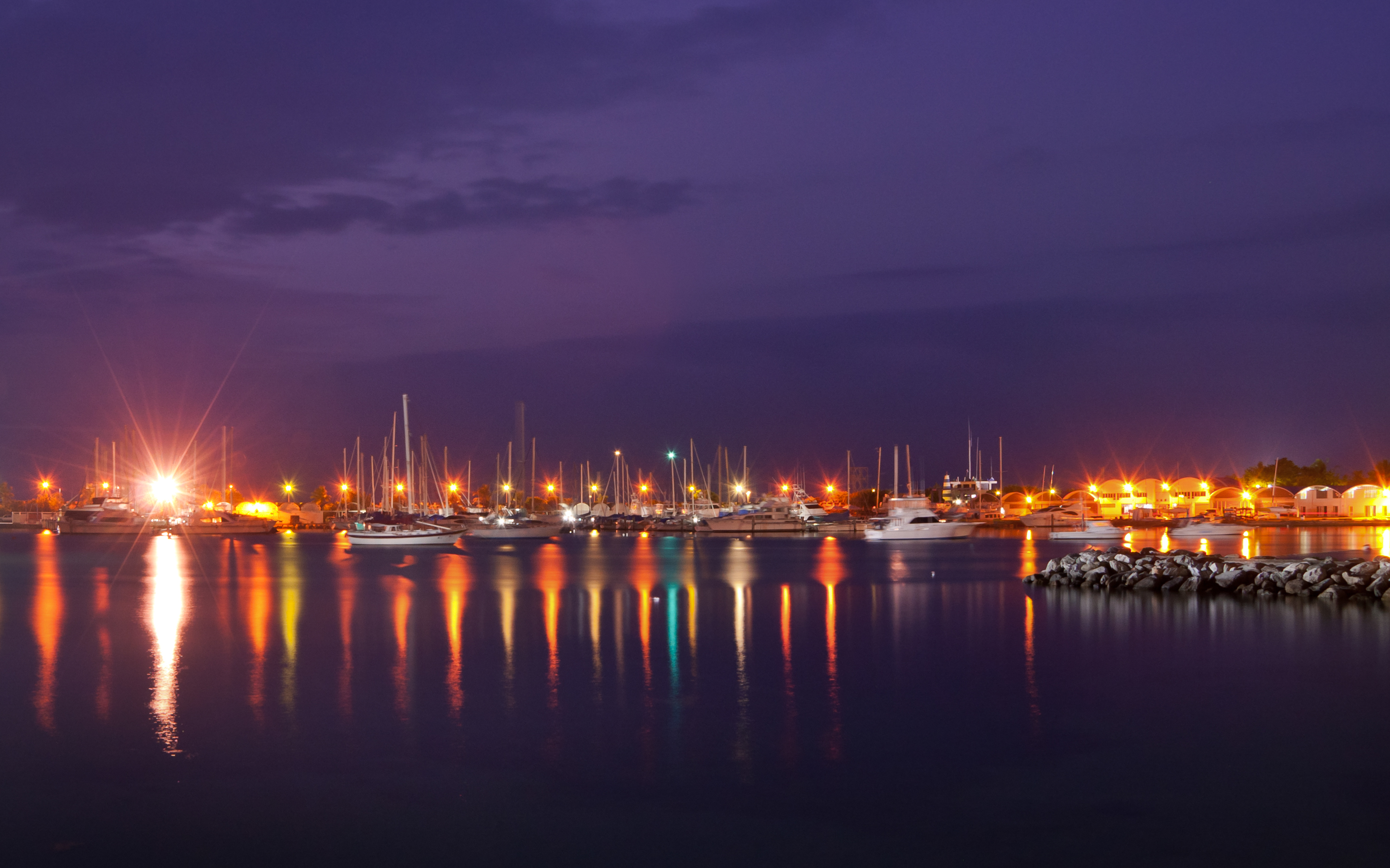
Naiguatá, view of the dock after the sunset

Some rivers in the state of La Guaira are:

- Limón.
- Caruao.
- Chuspa.
- Naiguatá.
- La Vega.
- Tacagua
- Mamo
- Pantano

In the state there are streams with the same name of some rivers in the area for simply being in the middle of the route of these water bodies.

=== Soils ===
Considering as unit of analysis the mountainous system of the Coast, of which the Vargas state is part, the predominant type of soil in this unit is the Haplustults, whose main characteristics are: moderately deep (from 75 cm to 100 cm), of medium to fine textures, increasing its clay content with depth. It is moderately stony, with medium to high contents of organic matter in the surface horizons. Drainage varies from well to excessively drained.

Based on the soil-forming factors and the predominant type of reference soil (Haplustults), in the entity the Haplargids and Torriorthents soil types were identified in the areas near the coast, where the humidity conditions are critical. In areas with higher slopes, Udorthents soils are classified, and in areas with lower slopes, the Paleustults. In areas with lower temperatures, typical of the mountain landscape, evolved and deep soils are identified as the Haplohumuslts. In areas of higher humidity, such as those at the extremes of the state, Hapludults soils are classified.

=== Vegetation ===
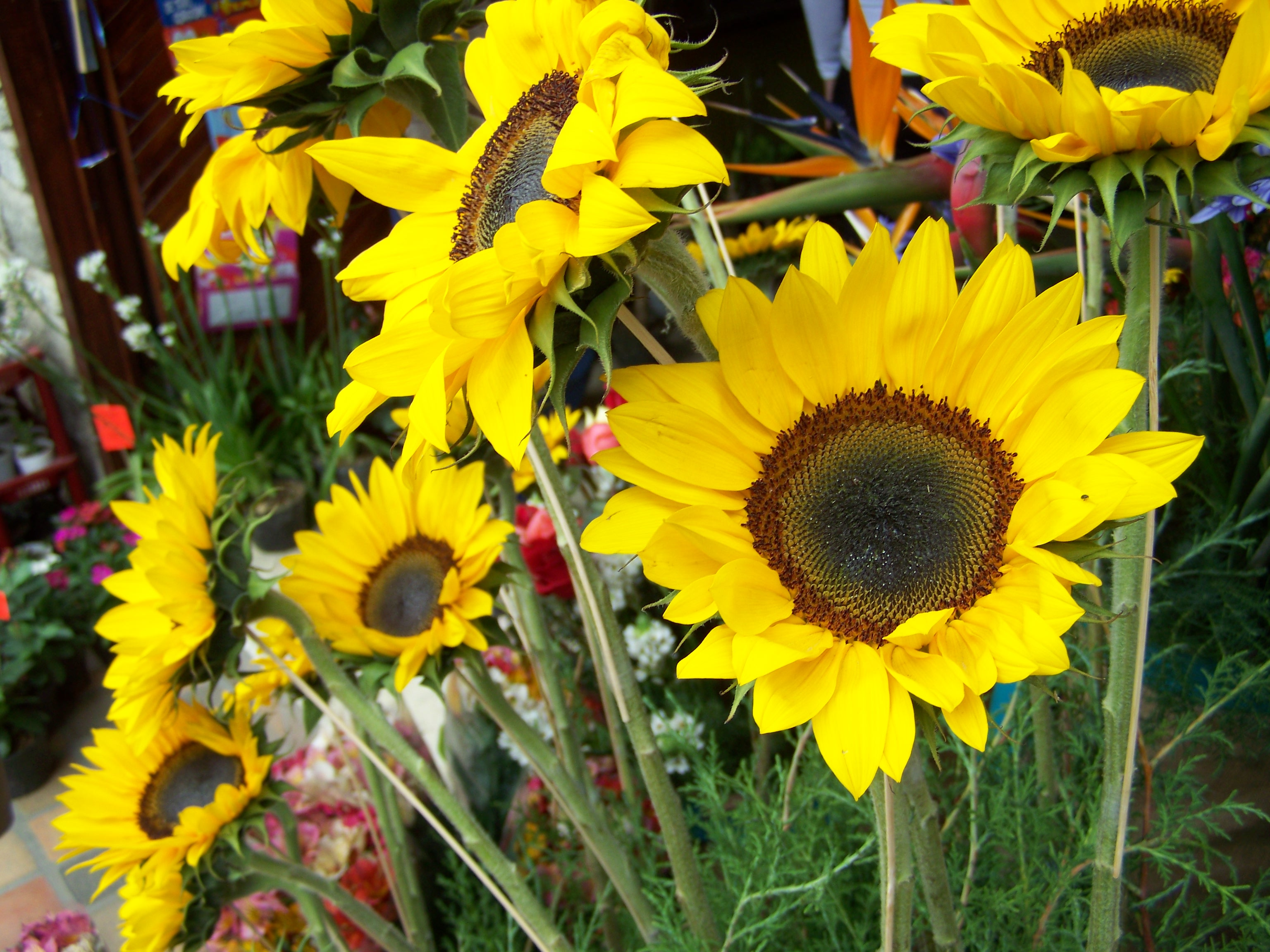
Flowers in the mountainous area of the state

Adopting Otto Huber's classification of plant formations, the plant landscape varguense is quite contrasted, being identified from the altitudinal base to 100 meters above sea level coastal vegetation of the halophilic and psamophilic herbaceous type, and bushes coastal xerophiles. Next, and according to the altitudinal succession, we observe thorny xerophytic shrubs (cardinal and spiny) of very variable density and low altitude (2–5 m); it is followed by the troopophilic basimontane forest, deciduous, transitional vegetation of the lowland species by the mountain species. Then, in the submontane belt extends the ombrophile forest, seasonal semideciduous (trade winds forests). It is followed by a well-developed strip of submontane to evergreen mountain forests, called coastal cloud forests, dense forests with several medium to high tree strata. Finally, at the upper limit of the forest, from 2,200 meters above sea level, the areas of coastal shrubby moors are identified.

=== Biodiversity ===
The biodiversity of the state of Vargas is as rich and varied as its natural spaces. In the southwestern section of the state, in the mountainous zone of the cloud forest, there is a great variety of tree species, among the most exuberant are trees such as granadillo (Prumnopitys harmsiana), Sapium sp. and cedar (Cedrela Montana). Of this last species is a specimen called "the giant cedar", which has a height of 47 meters and a diameter of 22 meters, located in the La Florida peak (2,240 meters above sea level). Another impressive tree in the area is the niño (Gyranthera caribensis), endemic to the Coastal Range. There are numerous species of guamos (Inga sp.), Protium sp., Alchornea triplinervia and Micropholis crotonoides, and palms such as the striking prapa (Wettinia praemorsa). In the hillside areas you can observe the majestic royal palms (Ceroxylon interruptum), palmetto (Euterpe predatoria), molinillo (Chamaedorea pinnatifrons) and araque (Dictyocaryum fuscum). Others Important species are the orchids, especially the Christmas orchid (Masdevallia tovarensis), an endemic species of the natural monument Agustin Codazzi.

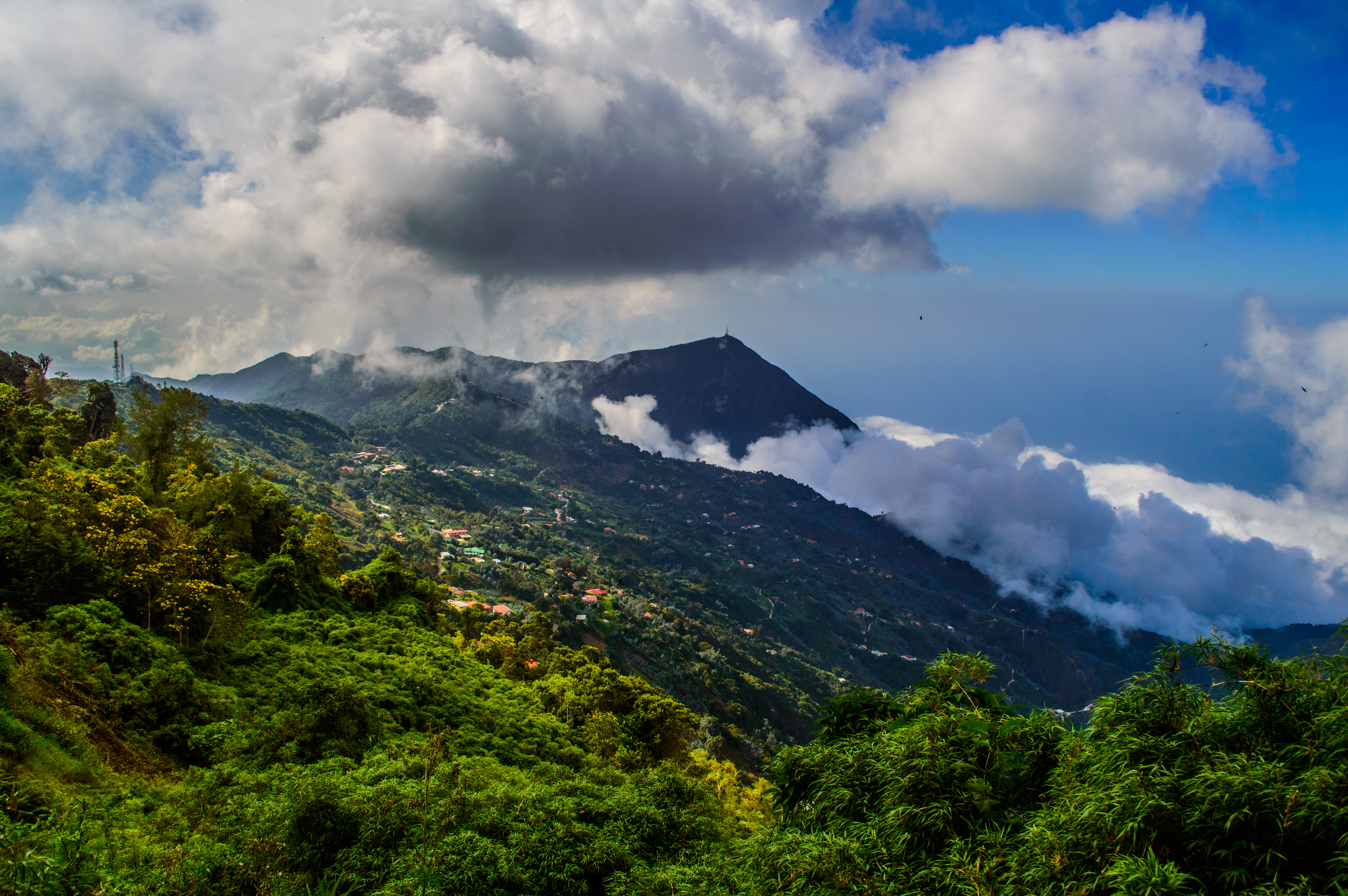
Picacho de Galipan, La Guaira State

== Government and politics ==
Like other states, the structure of the government of Vargas is laid out in the Constitution, the highest law in the state.

It is an autonomous state and politically equal to the rest of the Venezuelan federation, it organizes its administration and public powers through the constitution of the State of La Guaira, dictated by the Legislative Council, and which was sanctioned on August 23, 2001, entering into force on August 30, 2001, when it was published in the Official State Gazette.

=== Executive Power ===
It is composed of the governor and a group of state secretaries appointed by him to assist him in the management of the government. The governor is elected by the people by direct and secret vote for a period of four years and with the possibility of immediate reelection for equal periods, being in charge of the state administration.

Since the elevation to the category of federal state, the state has chosen its governors in direct elections, before 1998 its governor was the same of the disappeared Federal District.

The current state government has been headed since 2021 by José Manuel Suárez.

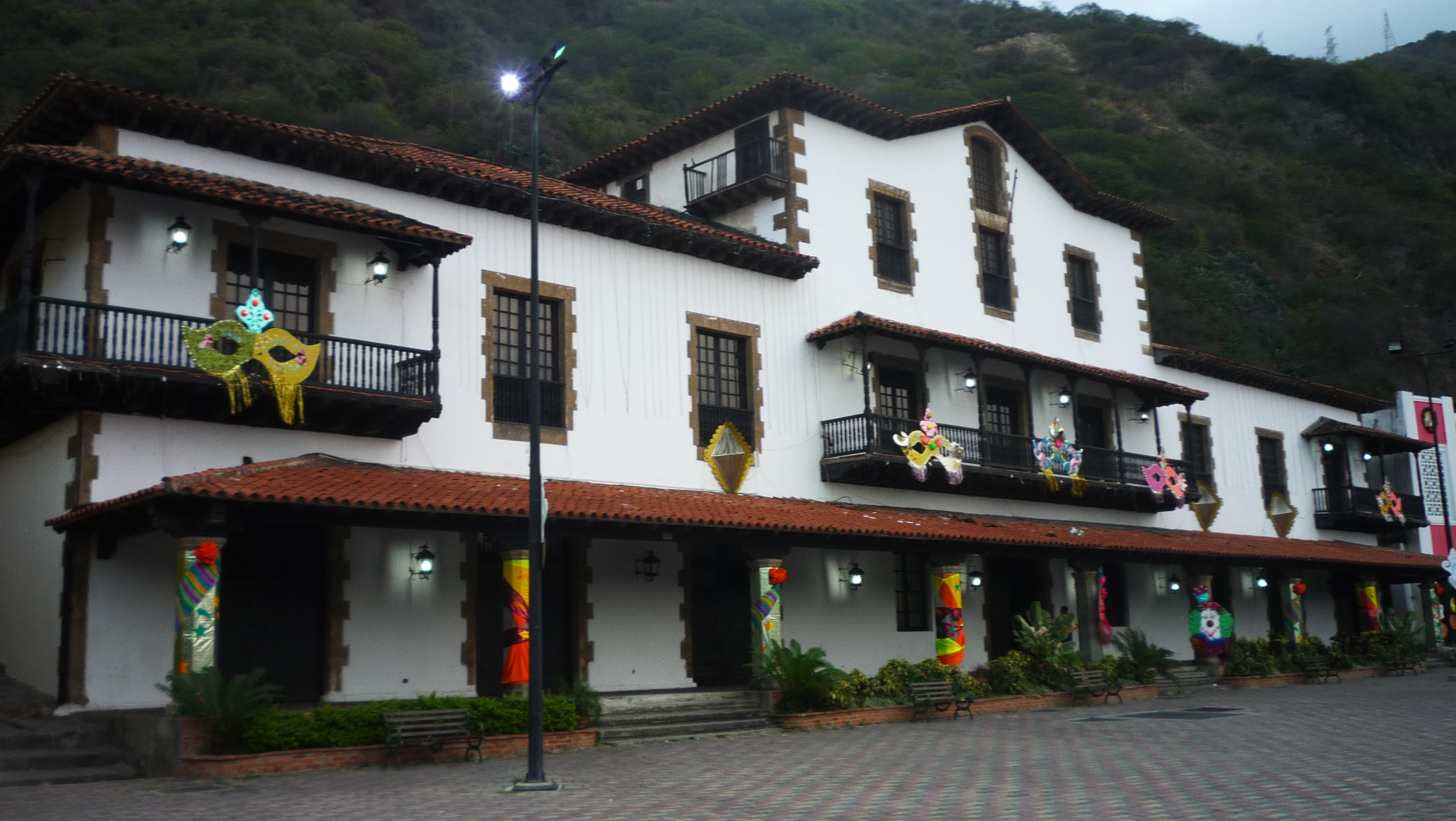
Casa Guipuzcoana, seat of the state government

=== Legislative Power ===
The state legislature falls to the Legislative Council of the State of La Guaira, a unicameral parliament, elected by the people through direct and secret vote every four years, and they can be reelected for consecutive periods, under a system of proportional representation of the population of the state and its municipalities. Since the last elections, the state has had 7 deputies, of which 1 belongs to the opposition and 6 to the government.

=== Vargas Police ===
Like the other 23 federal entities of Venezuela, the State maintains its own police force, which is supported and complemented by the National Police and the Venezuelan National Guard.

== Demographics ==
Historical population
Year	Pop.	±% p.a.
1873	19,226	—
1881	24,262	+2.95%
1891	26,110	+0.74%
1920	32,896	+0.80%
1926	39,961	+3.30%
1936	46,349	+1.49%
1941	53,387	+2.87%
1950	85,889	+5.43%
1961	141,270	+4.63%
1971	202,137	+3.65%
1981	253,841	+2.30%
1990	280,439	+1.11%
2001	298,109	+0.56%
2011	352,920	+1.70%
Source: "XIV CENSO NACIONAL DE POBLACIÓN Y VIVIENDA - Resultados por Entidad Federal y Municipio del Estado Vargas" (PDF). Instituto Nacional de Estadística.

=== Race and ethnicity ===
According to the 2011 Census, the racial composition of the population was:

Racial composition	Population	%
Mestizo	—N/a	48.1
White	153,252	44.7
Black	19,199	5.6
Other race	—N/a	1.6

== Tourism ==
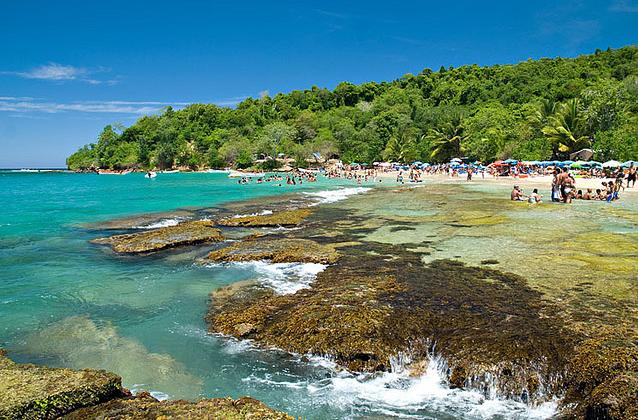
Tourism is vital to economy of the La Guaira state.

The tourist resource in the state is conformed by natural attractions, contributed by the contrast that exists between the sea and the mountains. From the coast, a mountainous relief houses natural riches. In the entity there is a great number of natural beaches and spas, predominantly those of natural origin. The latter are less visited due to their remoteness and difficult accessibility from Caracas, except the natural beaches near Punta Gorda, Tanaguarena, Camurí Grande and Los Caracas.

On the other hand, the resorts are located in more accessible places, providing the public with some service infrastructure. Among the most popular are Playa Grande (Catia La Mar), Macuto, Camurí Chico, Playa Los Ángeles and Naiguatá.

In addition to beach areas, there are other natural options with potential for to carry out ecotourism activities, close to the beaches and associated with the enjoyment of rivers and surrounding mountains to the coast. Among the most prominent are mentioned, in the sense east–west: Chuspa, Caruao, La Sabana, Urama, Todasana, Oritapo, Osma, Los Caracas, Anare, Puerto Carayaca, Uricao, Chichiriviche, Puerto Cruz and Puerto Maya.

Many of the resources available in the state are being used by the intensive recreation and tourism in both the mountain and coastal areas; it is mention: Oricao Club Campestre, Club Tanaguarena, Club Camurí Grande, Club Puerto Azul, Ciudad Vacacional Los Caracas, Altos de Lagunazo, areas adjacent to the Humboldt Hotel and Caraballeda golf courses. In the agricultural area of Galipán, several restaurants and rural recreation sites have been implemented, of which the Museo de Piedra Marina Soñadora, one of the most visited in the area, stands out. There is also a recreational park in the state of Vargas bordering the town of El Junquito, located in the municipality of Libertador, equipped with services for intensive enjoyment of the open field; the Metropolitan Recreational Park El Junquito was created according to presidential decree No. 913 published in the Official Gazette No. 30,693 on 18 May 1975.

=== Beaches ===
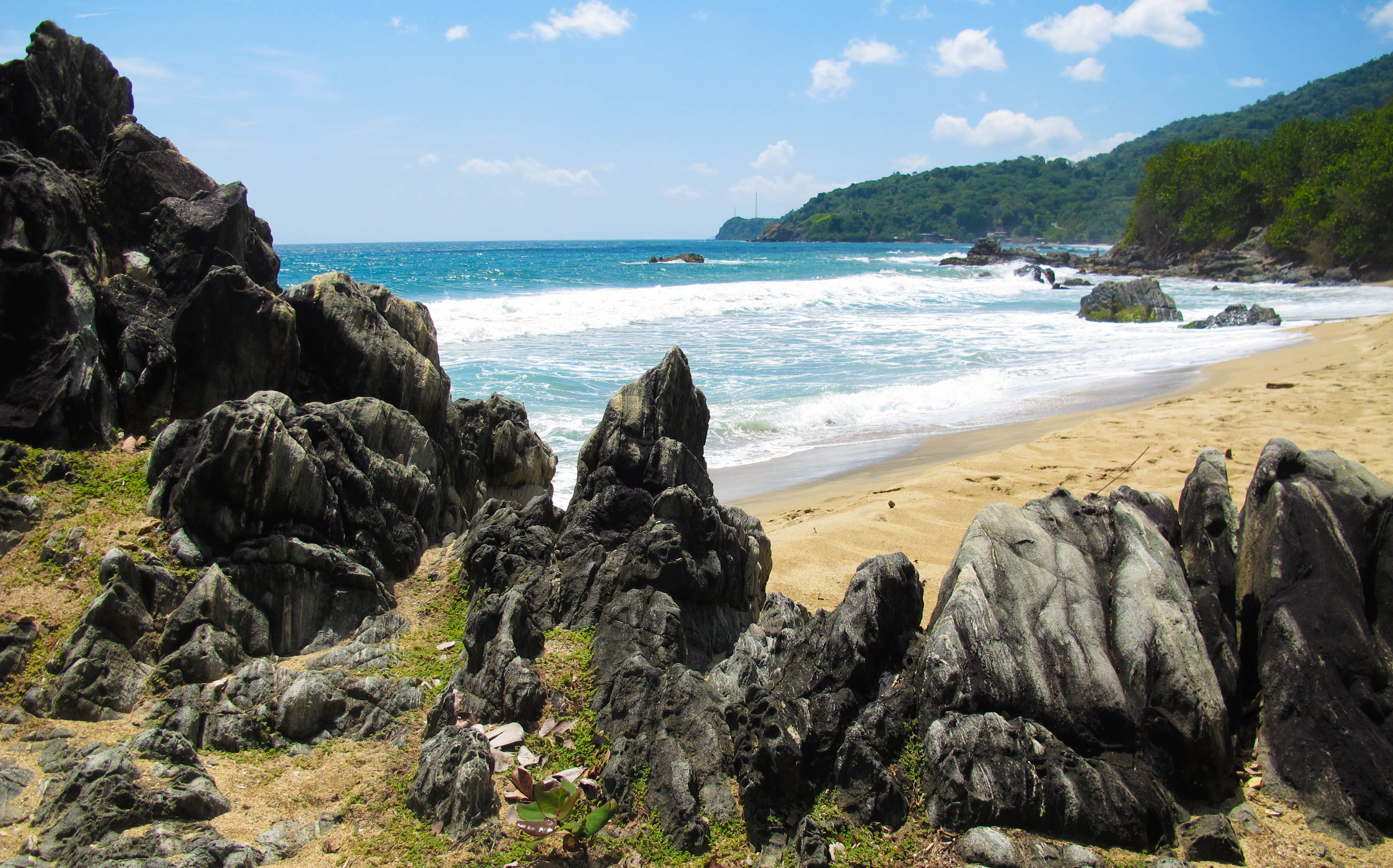
Larga Beach, La Guaira State

- Aeropuerto
- Caruao
- La Punta
- Marina Grande
- Punta Care
- Anare
- Catia La Mar
- La Sabana
- Naiguatá
- Quebrada Seca
- Arrecífe
- Chichiriviche
- La Salina
- Oricao
- San Luis
- Bahía Marina
- Chuspa
- La Zorra
- Oritapo
- Sheraton
- Bikini
- Círculo Militar
- Larga
- Osma
- Taguao
- Buchón
- El Burro
- Los ángeles
- Pantaleta
- Tarma
- Camurí Chico
- El Chorrito
- Los Caracas
- Paraíso
- Todasana
- Candileja
- El Farallón
- Los Cocos
- Puerto Carayaca
- Urama
- Caribito
- Escondida
- Macuto
- Puerto Cruz
- Verde

=== Historical Sites ===
- La Casa Guipuzcoana: This imposing colonial construction was built between 1734 and 1736 on the instructions of King Philip V. The specific function of the Real Compañía Guipuzcoana de Caracas was to defend the coasts and trade of Venezuela. Now it is the current seat of the La Guaira State Government.
- Fuerte San Carlos: Its construction dates from 1769, according to the project of Miguel Roncali, who was at that time Count of Roncali. However, for its construction, pieces from another fortress that according to Enrique Rivodó existed in 1604 were used. The fortress is designed in the shape of a star, it was designated National Historic Monument in 1876.
- Fortress El Vigía: It was built at the beginning of the 18th century, by Don Francisco Alberreo. From there it announced with the sound of the bells and the flags of elevation, the arrival of the ships to the port, its view is impressive.
- Colonial Zone of La Guaira: On June 29, 1589, don Diego de Osorio y Villegas founded the town of San Pedro de La Guaira, today these colonial buildings, with their facades and large windows can be seen in the parish.
- Castle of Las Salinas: It was built on the land of the García Laucarce family. Francisco Tabeayo was the one who built the bases of the Castle that initially would be a small construction compared to the current one. The upper floors were built later, for an inn or hotel project. The Castle was not finished because they prohibited to continue the work, since who gave the permissions was asking for an additional commission. The prohibition was alleged in that the land where it was settled was unstable.

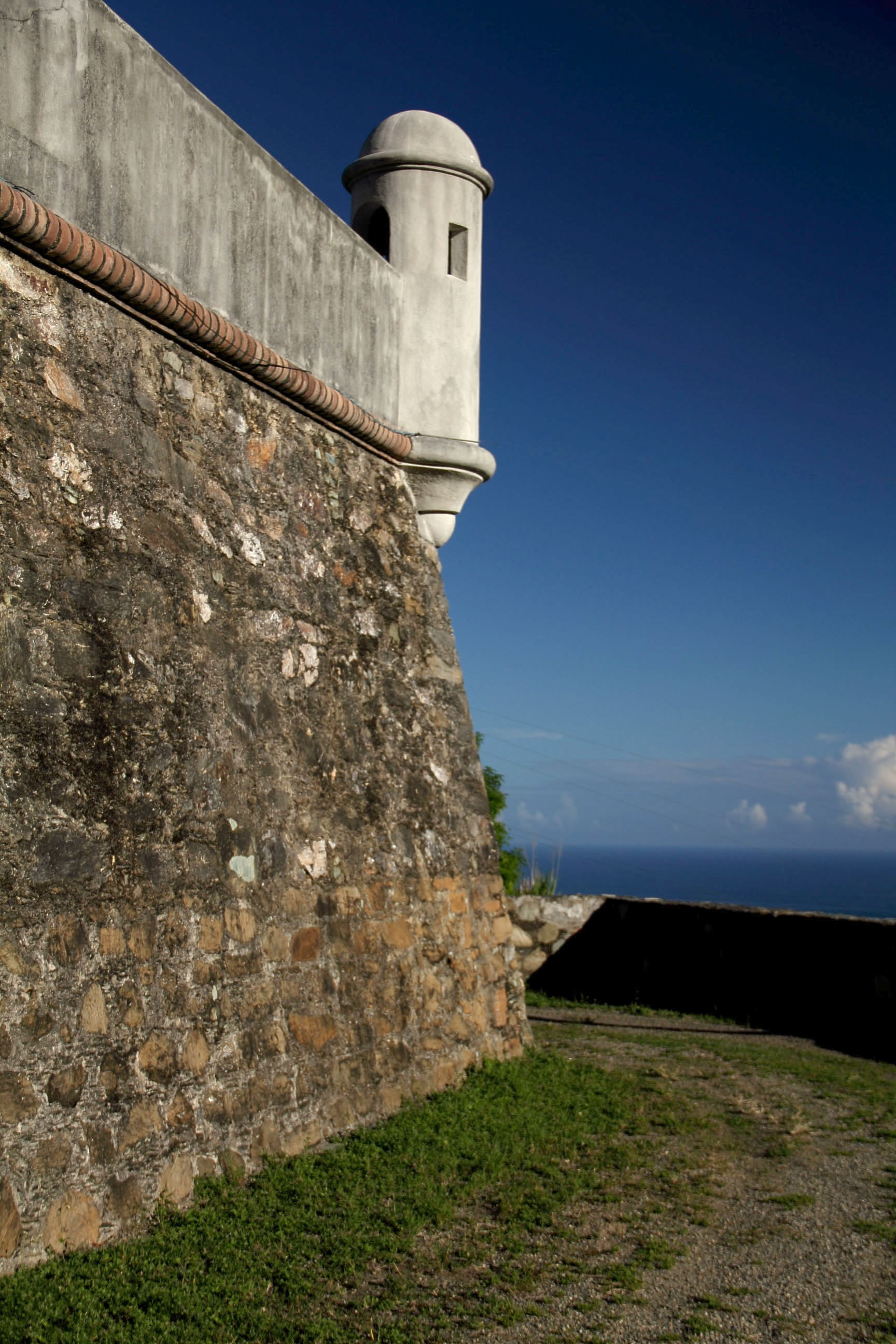
Fort of San Carlos, built by the Spanish during the second half of the 18th century

=== Museums ===
- Ateneo de La Guaira: The 18th-century building consists of three levels, of which the lower one is a basement and the upper one an attic. In the headquarters of the Ateneo, the Triangle Theater operates.
- Archaeological Museum of Panarigua: Archaeologist Luis Laffer founded this museum in Plan La Ansermera de Carayaca with the purpose of protecting for future generations the petroglyphs found in various sectors of El Limón and some archaeological collections from Margarita, Valencia and Falcón.
- Museum of the Dreaming Marine Stones, San José de Galipán: On June 30, 1990, this museum was inaugurated by the authorities of the Simón Bolívar University, the Association of Journalists and the Prefecture of the Vargas municipality. It is considered the first museum of ecological art in the world in its style.
- Armando Reverón Museum: located in the Sector Las 15 Letras, which inspired Armando Reverón, whose home (Castillete) was transformed into a museum in 1974. The Armando Reverón Museum Foundation has a collection of original paintings and a large number of objects made by the artist.
- Gal Gallery: it is a cultural reference in Chuspa and in the whole state of La Guaira. Its name derives from the artist Froilán Colina, who signs all his works Gal, in reference to his nickname, Galopo. In its installations are exposed samples of the artists of the sector.
- Museum of the Truth: Institution founded by Luis Kafella in Todasana whose main purpose is to promote art and at the same time, to make this museum an instrument to create conscience, to inform and to prevent the young people who visit it. In the museum there are sculptures of didactic and moral character in which a moral or a lesson of life is always enclosed

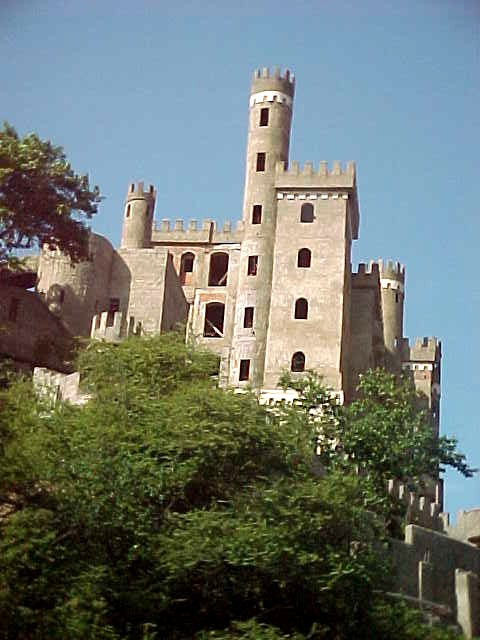
Las Salinas Castle, Tacoa

== Culture ==
=== Cultural Heritage ===
Within the state exists "The Individual Creation", a series of autonomous manifestations within the region and they are constituted in definitive as people of cultural relevance, for what their inhabitants devote themselves to the literature, to the interpretative creations, call the singer-songwriter, musicians and dances, many of the collections, the patrimonial carriers and to the artistic creations; among those that stand out inside a great range:

=== Bolivarian Society of La Guaira House ===
It is considered a place of interest for debates, talks and discussions of knowledge with the studies of the history of Venezuela; headquarters of the Bolivarian Society of La Guaira. Located and conforms within what is the peripheries within the historical real helmet of the Guaira, right there is the Library "Adam Jose Seijas" and it is estimated that the Property was constructed during the times of the Colonization; It is characterized for having a patio in its interior as the main axis, and that around it are the offices next to its rooms, the Stables at the end of it, and that to both sides are the warehouse, bedrooms or rooms, but that in its interior have doors of closings in wood or of lock, and with an annex like conference room for with the different sessions of the center; It is worth mentioning that the structure is of a single floor with its wooden roofs in tiles, with its main door in wood with lattice, together with its three windows also in wood and wrought in iron, whose facade is of pure frieze. It is worth mentioning that also within the Bolivarian Society House of La Guayra, it houses the sections and activities for the Lions Club and the Rotary Club.

=== Celebrations ===
==== Descent of the Magi ====
Every January 6, after the children make a written request for a toy from the Three Kings, leaving the requested gift on their shoes. This tradition keeps alive the childish illusion.

==== Virgin of Candelaria ====
Every year, on February 2, the Patron Saint's Day of the Virgin of Candelaria in its context is made up of the popular religious behavior of the social collectivities. The dance groups, costumes, masks and bands of musicians lead to expressions of overflowing festive sensibility. Finally, the Candlemas Festival has been gaining national space, recreating the Puno patron saint festival in Arequipa, Lima, places where the residents of the Altiplano express their cultural identity. People can go sightseeing in the areas.

==== The Burial of the Sardine ====
It is celebrated on Ash Wednesday, after Carnival, and is charged with irreverence, ambiguous characters with inverted roles and expressions of relaxation. In the beginning it was associated with the custom of burying a pig's rib called sardine, symbolizing the prohibition of eating meat during the days of Lent.

There are those who believe that the burial of the sardine was a way of attracting abundant fishing and fertility of the animals before a new cycle of reproduction, but it is also considered a typical festival of carnivals because it is a time when it is normally allowed to do everything that is prohibited and the manifestation also acquires these characteristics. It is in itself a parody, simulating the passage of a burial in the streets of the town.

==== Saint Joseph's Day ====
Like so many other traditions in the state, the feast of St. Joseph is celebrated on March 19.

==== Dancing Devils of Naiguatá ====
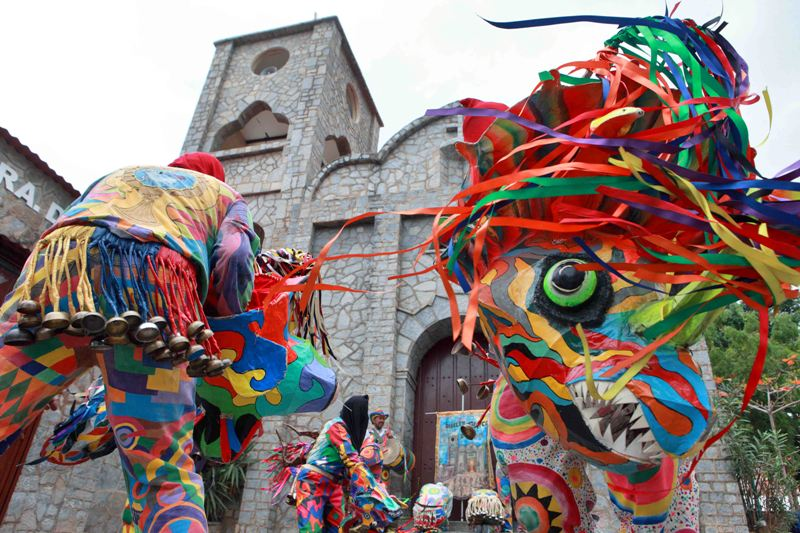
Diablos Danzantes de Naiguatá

The dancing devils of Corpus Christi, along with 11 other brotherhoods in the country, entered the representative list of Intangible Cultural Heritage of Humanity approved by the United Nations Educational, Scientific and Cultural Organization (UNESCO) in Paris on December 6, 2012.25 This is the legacy of the first inhabitants of Naiguatá, a product of racial and cultural crossbreeding. In this magical-religious celebration of Corpus Christi, the Holy Sacrament of the Altar is worshipped in a festival of marked religious syncretism with the dance of hundreds of Devils dancing all over the town, making their tradition last in time and never to be forgotten. They identify themselves by painting their own costumes, wearing white pants and a white shirt, painted with crosses, stripes and circles, figures that prevent the evil one from dominating them. The masks are mostly marine animals. They wear crossed scapulars, carry holy palm crosses and crucifixes. They do not wear a cape or a mandator.

==== Feast of the Holy Innocents ====
Every December 28, the Catholic Church commemorates the death of the Holy Innocents in honor of the children killed by order of King Herod. In the Middle Ages this rite was linked to another more pagan rite known as the "Feast of the Fools", celebrated on the days between Christmas and New Year. This fusion of history, religion and paganism has in turn led to a series of celebrations in various regions of the world that include costumes, typical music and the congregation of communities to participate.

==== Feast of St. John the Baptist ====
In Venezuela, it is a tradition in this population that the celebration begins on the eve of the day of San Juan Bautista, that is, on June 23 at night. At the beginning of the afternoon, the drummers begin with the execution of the mine drum and the curbata, located at one side of the square. Already at night, in a nearby house where the small image of San Juan Bautista is found, in its niche well decorated with colored papers, flowers, fabrics and palms, the drummers arrive and begin to "intone" in front of the saint to begin the first wake.

== Sports ==
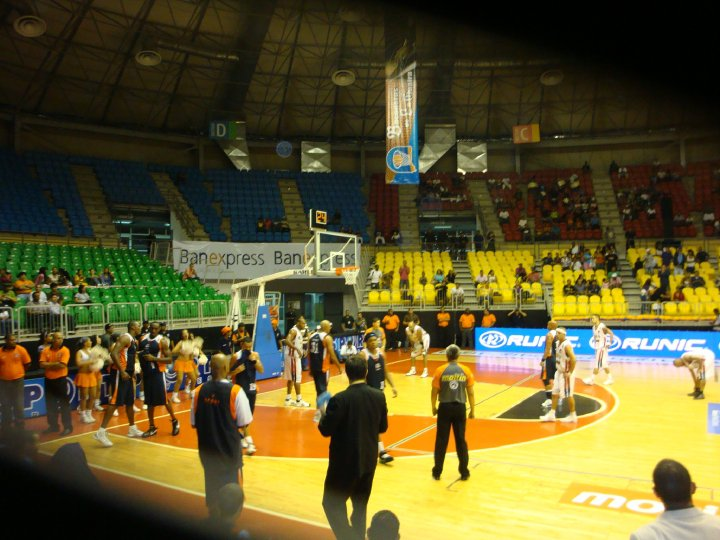
José María Vargas Dome during a local league basketball game

In the State of La Guaira, various sports are practiced, the most popular disciplines being Baseball, Basketball, Volleyball and Soccer. Among the soccer teams we can mention the Deportivo La Guaira Fútbol Club that plays in the First Division of Venezuela. While Baseball the state is represented by Los Tiburones de La Guaira which plays in the Venezuelan professional baseball league or LVBP (for its acronym in Spanish).

Among the most important sports facilities we can name the Jose Maria Vargas Dome (used for sports such as Basketball, Volleyball or indoor soccer), the Forum Stadium in La Guaira (or La Guaira Baseball Stadium), the Cesar Nieves Stadium in Catia La Mar, the Hugo Chávez Beach Coliseum and the Sports Complex in Mare Abajo. The State has organized numerous sports events among which the 2019 Bolivarian Beach Games and the 2014 South American Beach Games can be mentioned.

== See also ==
- Venezuela
- States of Venezuela
- 1999 Vargas mudslide catastrophe
- Dancing devils of Corpus Christi
