= Chuspa =

- Location within Venezuela
- Coordinates: 10°36′59″N 66°18′47″W
- Country: Venezuela
- State: Vargas
- Founded: 1555

Population
  - Total: 3,918
- Time zone: UTC-4:30 (VST)
  - Summer (DST): UTC-4:30 (not observed)
- Postal code: 1166
- Area code: 0231
- Climate: Am

Chuspa is a village in the Venezuelan state of Vargas. The village is mainly a fishermen's location with some tourist attractions. It is connected through a coast road with La Guaira and Higuerote. The town is located at the side of the Chuspa river.

== History ==
Conquistador Francisco Fajardo arrived to this place in 1555 in his quest to control the Caracas region. Cocoa plantations were established in the Chuspa Valley during the Colonial time. During the 17th century plantation owners brought in African slaves in increasing numbers. The Chuspa region had about 200000 cocoa trees by the second half of the 19th century.

On 18 November 1813 a sea battle between the pro-independence and the Spanish forces took place between Puerto Francés and Chuspa. The pro-independence troops, led by Manuel Piar, ended up defeating the royalists.

== Infrastructure ==
=== Tourism ===
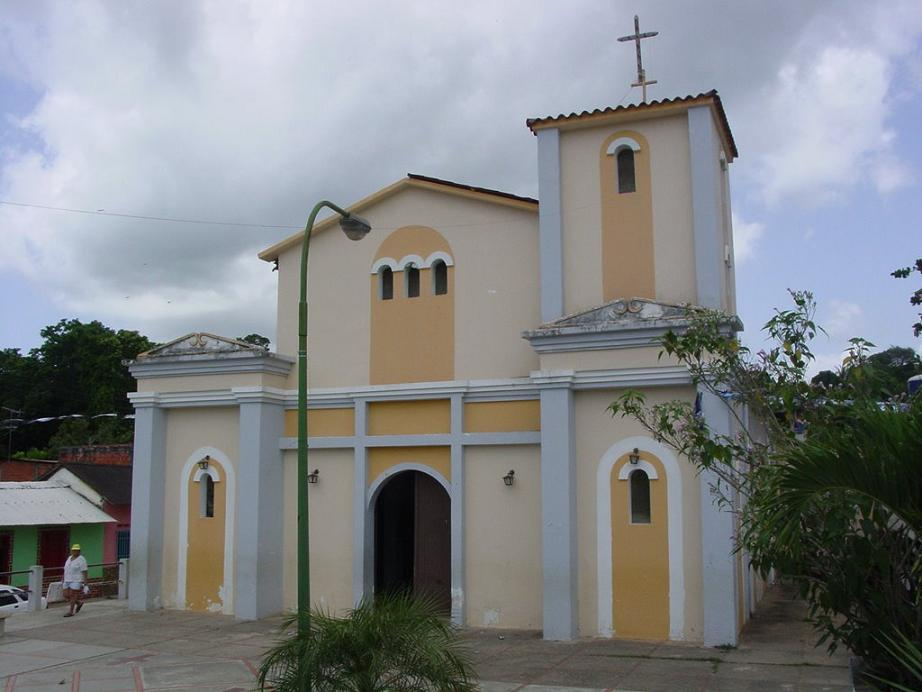
Church Chuspa

There is a small port used by fishermen and small tourist companies. Several hostels and restaurants can be found over the place. There is a 230-metre long beach in front of Chuspa. Tourists can hire a boat and reach within 10 to 15 minutes larger beaches like Caribe, Los Indios, Capino and Mono Manso in Miranda state. There is an internet café.

=== Education and culture ===
Chuspa has a school and a kindergarten. It also has a public library.
