= Vargas Municipality =

Vargas Municipality Municipio Vargas
- Municipality
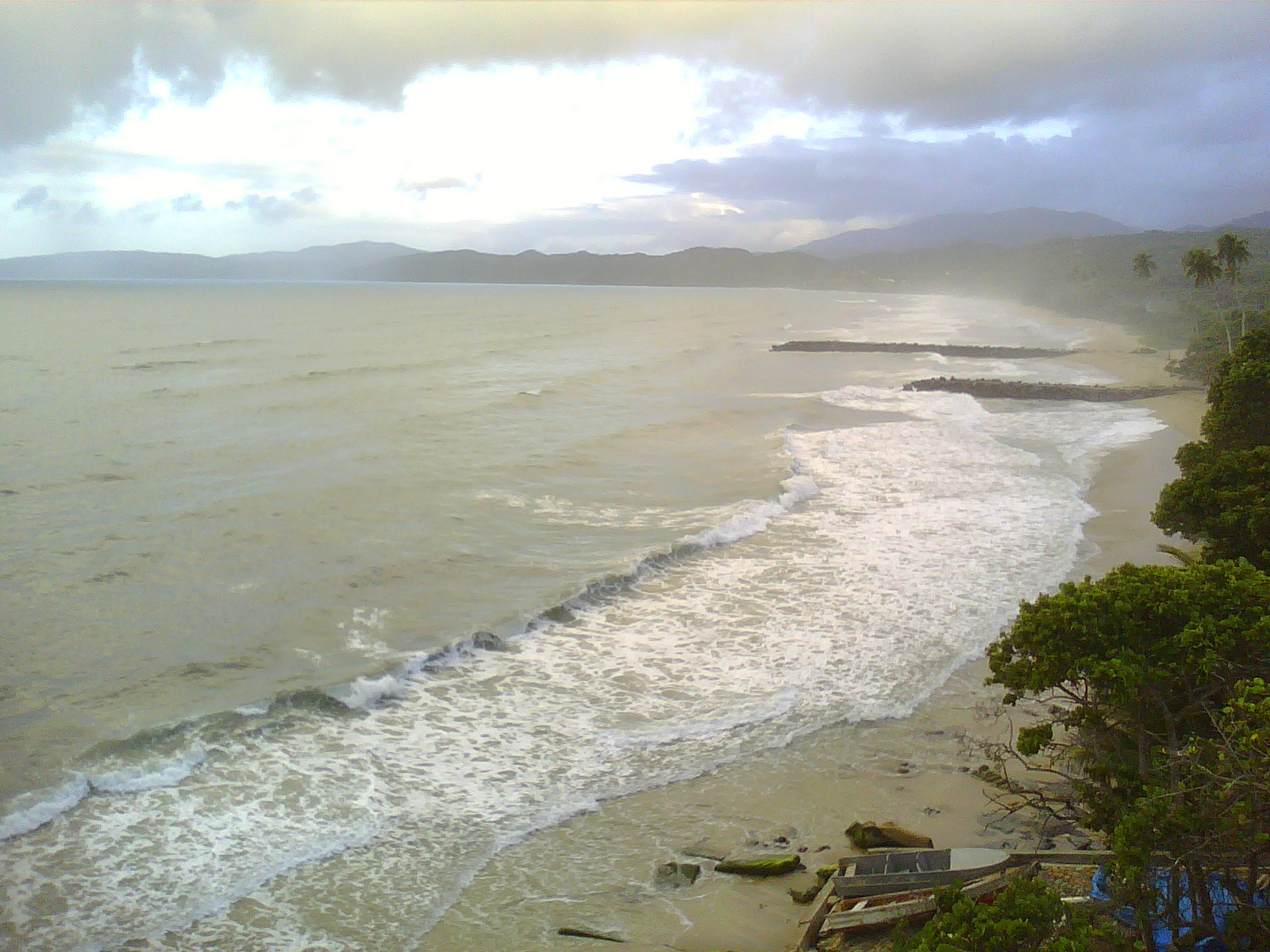
- Playa La Sabana, La Sabana, Vargas

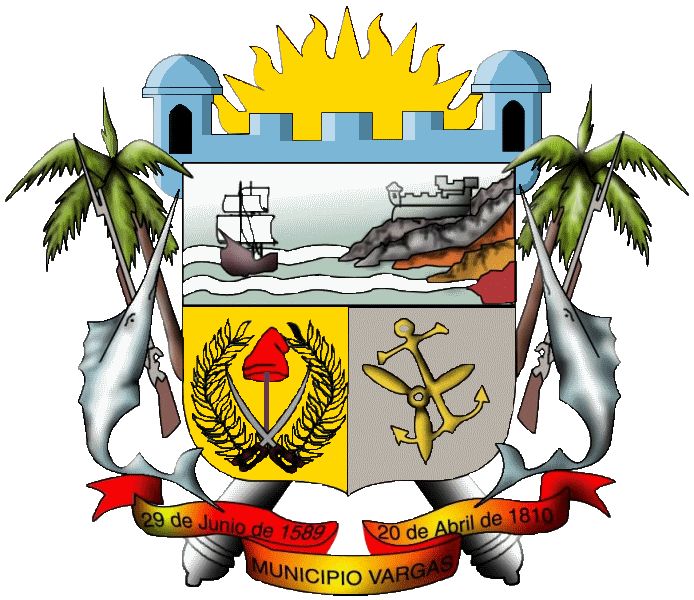
- Coat of arms

- Location in La Guaira

- Location in Venezuela
- Coordinates: 10°36′00″N 66°55′59″W
- Country: Venezuela
- State: La Guaira
- Municipal seat: La Guaira

Government
  - Mayor: José Manuel Suárez Maldonado (PSUV)

Area
  - Total: 1,172 km^{2} (453 sq mi)

Population (2011)
  - Total: 352,920
  - Density: 301.1/km^{2} (779.9/sq mi)
- Time zone: UTC−4 (VET)
- Area code(s): 0212

Vargas Municipality is the only municipality of the La Guaira state in Venezuela.

== Parishes and villages ==
=== Parishes ===
Parishes	Area	Population (2011)
Caraballeda	67 km²	67,683
Carayaca	475 km²	49,248
Carlos Soublette	7 km²	52,005
Caruao	229 km²	7233
Catia La Mar	38 km²	112,444
El Junko	20 km²	12,688
La Guaira	14 km²	25,724
Macuto	32 km²	25,506
Maiquetía	22 km²	50,985
Naiguatá	241 km²	20,099
Urimare	26 km²	63,209

=== Villages ===
- La Sabana
