= Carayaca =

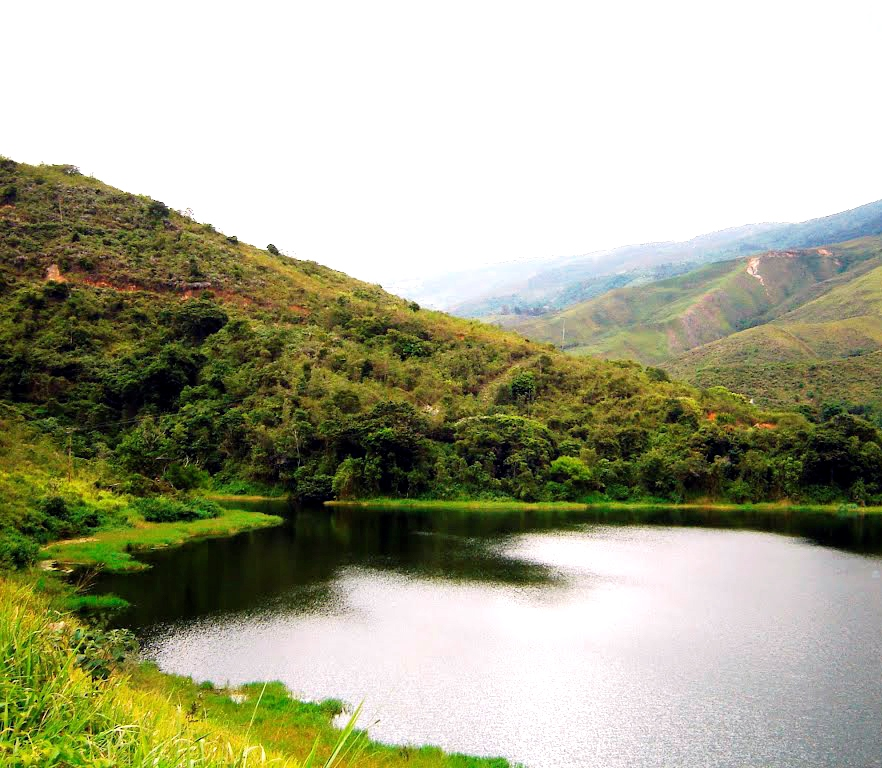

- Location within Venezuela
- Coordinates: 10°31′56″N 67°6′57″W
- Country: Venezuela
- State: Vargas
- Municipality: Vargas

Area
  - Total: 475 km^{2} (183 sq mi)

Population (2013)
  - Total: 40,096
- Time zone: VST
- Climate: BSh

Carayaca is a city located in Vargas, Venezuela.
