= Catia La Mar =

City and port in Vargas State, Venezuela

- City
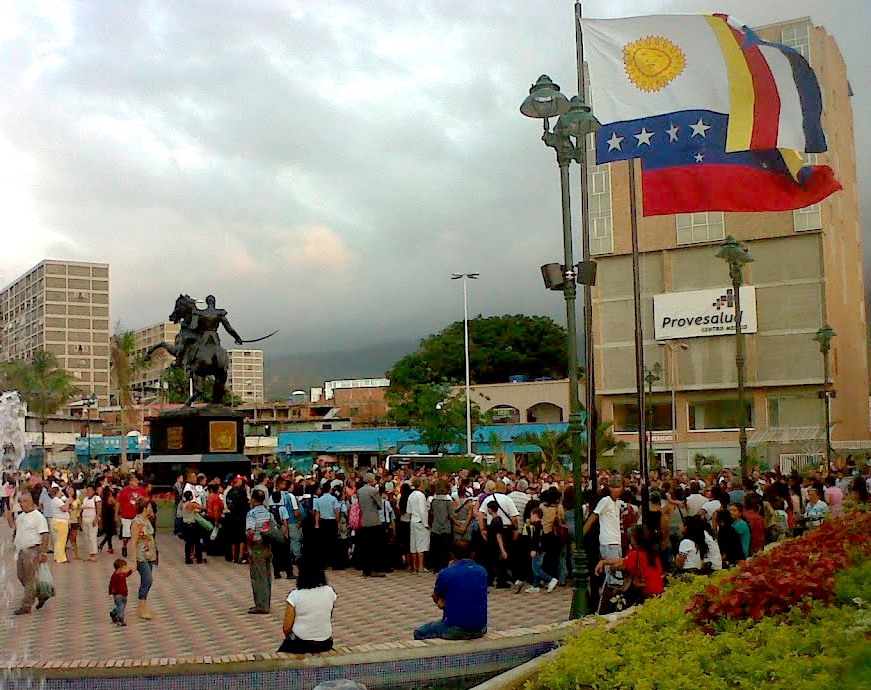
- Catia La Mar Mayor Square (Plaza Mayor de Catia La Mar)

- Location within Venezuela Location within the Caribbean Location within South America
- Coordinates: 10°36′N 67°02′W
- Country: Venezuela
- State: La Guaira
- Municipality: Vargas

Area
  - Total: 38 km^{2} (15 sq mi)

Population (2019)
  - Total: 141,900
  - Density: 3,700/km^{2} (9,700/sq mi)
- Time zone: UTC−4 (VET)

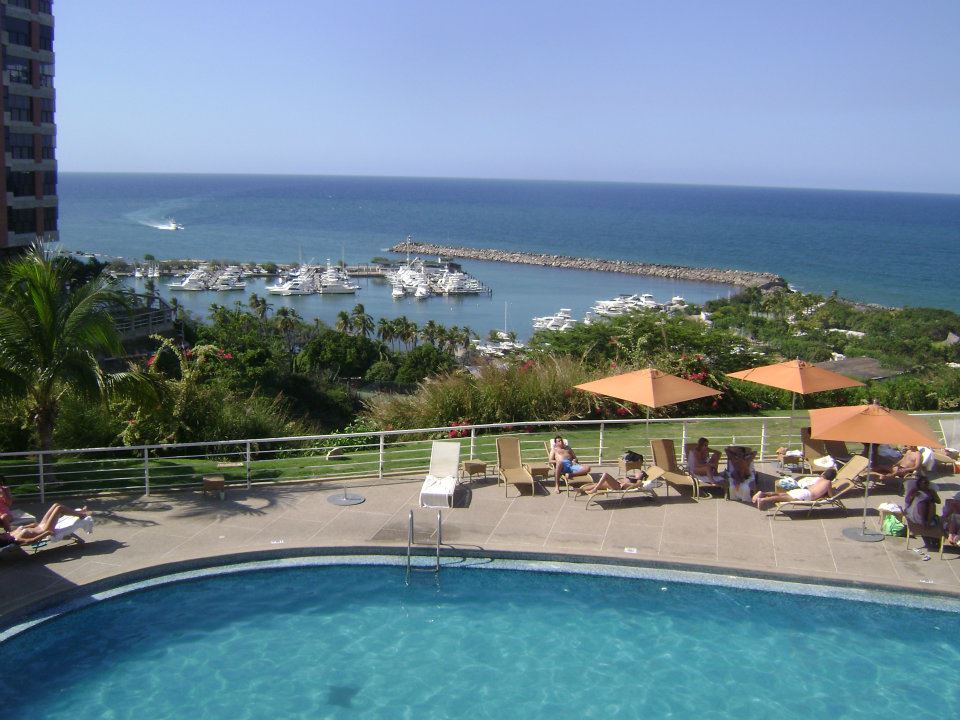
Beach in Catia La Mar

Catia La Mar is a city and port in the municipality of Vargas, in the Venezuelan state of La Guaira (also previously called Vargas). It is Maiquetía's neighbor to the west.

Catia la Mar is about 10 minutes from Simón Bolívar International Airport, Venezuela's main airport.

Named after the 16th-century cacique Catia, contemporary of Guaicaipuro, founded in 1558 by Francisco Fajardo with the name of "La Villa de Catia", currently called Catia la Mar. The city hosts a naval academy and university, a fishing port called La Zorra, and several beaches (Costa Dorada, Playa La Zorra, Playa Candilejas, Puerto Viejo). Its main neighborhoods are Atlantida, Playa Grande, Páez, Ezequiel Zamora, La Lucha, and La Soublette.

According to the 2011 population census, the city had 85,366 inhabitants, making it the most populous of the 11 parishes in La Guaira.

The city was affected by the 1999 Vargas tragedy, by 2026 United States strikes in Venezuela and 2026 Venezuela earthquakes.

== See also ==
- Caribbean South America
- Venezuelan Caribbean
