= Caraballeda =

- Parish
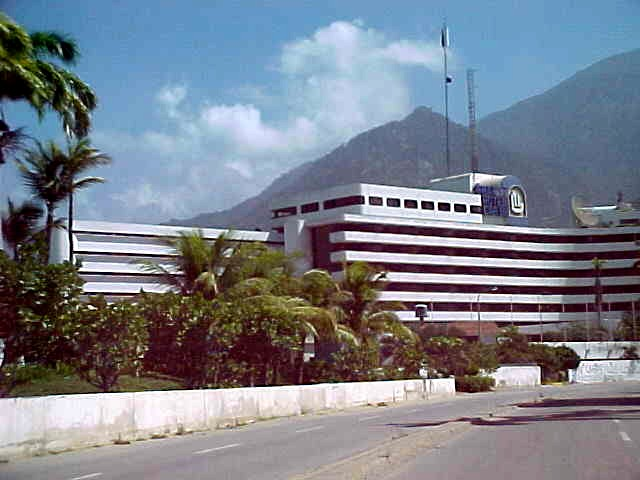

- Location in Venezuela
- Coordinates: 10°36′47″N 66°51′02″W
- Country: Venezuela
- State: La Guaira State
- Municipality: Vargas
- Founded: 1568

Population (2011)
  - Total: 48,622
- Time zone: VST
- Postal Code: 1165

Caraballeda is a Venezuelan town, capital of the parish of the same name La Guaira state. It is located on the Venezuelan central coast, facing the Caribbean Sea. It was devastated by flood and mudslides in December 1999, and by earthquakes in June 2026.

The area of Caraballeda, located in a highly seismic zone, is 82.1 square kilometres (31.7 sq mi).

== History ==
Caraballeda was founded as the original port for the capital, Caracas, by Captain Diego de Losada in early 1568. The name is derived from the Carballeda Virgin, patron saint of the town of Rionegro del Puente in Zamora, Spain, which was the birthplace of Diego de Losada.

Caraballeda was granted considerable privileges of self-government by the Spanish Cabinet. For eighteen years the city did well, and was one of the most prosperous in the colony; but in 1586 the governor of Venezuela, Don Luis de Rojas y Mendoza, a tyrant, attempted to take the power of appointing Caraballeda's officials. Rather than submit, most of the city's inhabitants abandoned their houses and fields and wandered off. The successor of Rojas endeavoured to persuade them back again, but in vain. Afterwards, as a port was necessary, La Guaira, six miles to the west, was founded in 1588, and is now the chief port of the Republic.

Earthquakes occurred in 1641, 1776, 1812, and 1900. There was a great loss of lives in the earthquake of July 29, 1967.

When the Macuto-Sheraton Hotel opened in 1963 in Caraballeda it was the first Sheraton Hotel in Latin America. The beauty pageants Miss Venezuela 1980 through Miss Venezuela 1985 were held at the Macuto-Sheraton Hotel. The hotel was later renamed the Hotel Guaicamacuto.

=== Vargas tragedy ===
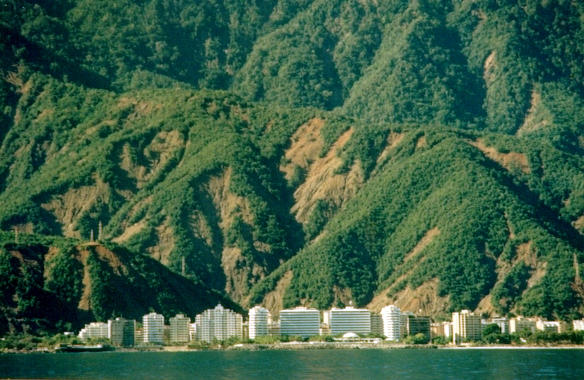
A section of the Vargas state after the 1999 Tragedy. Notice the scars in the mountains due to the mudslides.

On 15 December, 1999, tremendous rains occurred that led to mud slides. This occurred all along the coastal area that makes up Vargas state but was concentrated in Caraballeda. The debris flows that had occurred in the past provided the only flat places where structures could be built.

During the night, 1.8 million cubic meters of rocks and trees flowed through Caraballeda. Many buildings were washed out to sea. The ones that remained were filled with 8 feet (2.4 m) of sand and debris. The Macuto-Sheraton Hotel and the Melia Caribe hotel were so damaged that they were abandoned. Of the 300,000 people living on this part of the coast the government of Venezuela estimated that 15,000 died. Others estimated as many as 30,000. Initial estimates said 150,000 people were homeless.

=== 2026 earthquakes ===
0n 24 June 2026, two earthquakes struck northern Venezuela, killing more than 2,600, injuring 12,666, and leading tens of thousands missing. According to Sentinel satellite imagery analyzed by NASA, more than half the buildings in Caraballeda, among other towns of La Guaira, had a damage probability of at least 75%. That approximated to 59,000 buildings damaged in the state according to their analysis.
