= Maiquetía =

- City
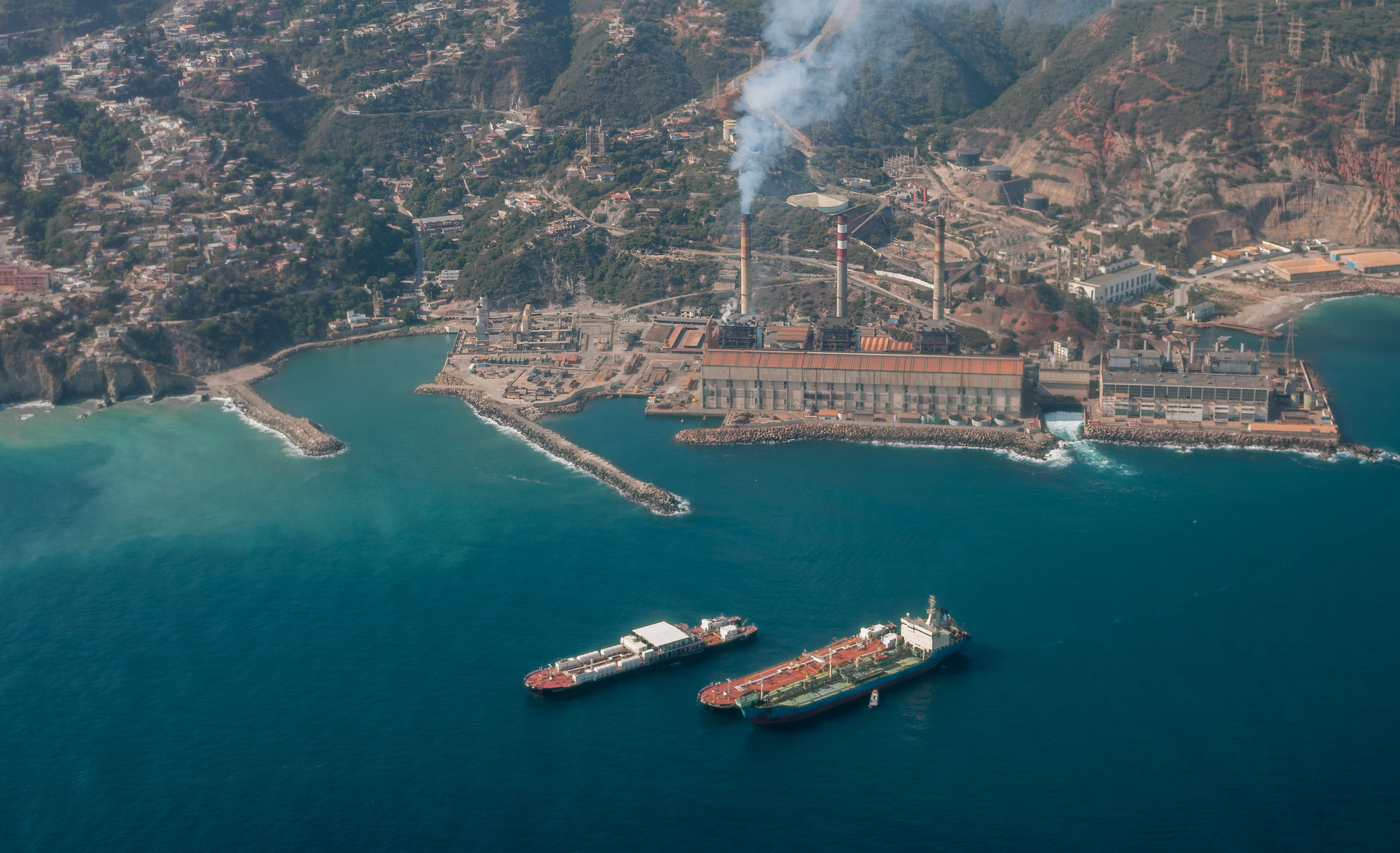
- Maiquetía coast

- Location within Venezuela
- Coordinates: 10°35′45″N 66°58′38″W
- Country: Venezuela
- State: (La Guaira (state)) La Guaira
- Municipality: Vargas Municipality
- Founded: 20 January 1670

Area
  - Total: 22 km^{2} (8.5 sq mi)
- Elevation: 19 m (62 ft)

Population (2007)
  - Total: 87,909
  - Density: 4,000/km^{2} (10,000/sq mi)
  - Demonym: Maiquetiense
- Time zone: UTC-04:00 (VST)
- Postal code: 1160, 1161
- Area code: 0212
- Climate: BSh
- Website: Municipal website

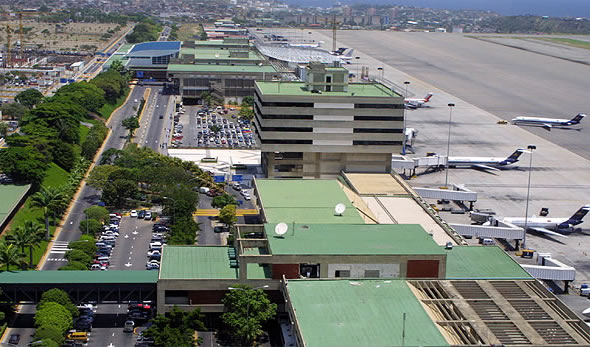
Simón Bolívar International Airport in Maiquetia, Vargas.

Maiquetía is a city located in the Central Region of Venezuela, in the state of La Guaira. It is at approximately 19 m above sea level on a small shelf between the Caribbean and the mountains behind it. It is located approximately 37 km northwest of Caracas.

Maiquetía is mainly a commercial center. The historic center has many narrow streets lined with stores and a market. The main road in this part of the city is the Avenida Carlos Soublette. The recent geopolitical divisions in Vargas makes Maiquetía no longer include the Simón Bolívar International Airport, the most important one in the country and the commercial airport serving Caracas. Even though the airport is now in the state of Vargas, it has kept the name Maiquetía International Airport. Conviasa, the Venezuelan flag carrier, is headquartered in the city.

The city forms a conurbation with La Guaira with which it is linked via Avenida Soublette. Given its proximity to Caracas and seafront location, it offers an optimal location for some hotels.

Maiquetía suffered the devastating effects of torrential rains and mudslides during the 1999 Vargas tragedy.

== Climate ==
Maiquetía has a tropical savannah climate (Aw) with hot, humid days and warm nights year round.

Climate data for Maiquetía, Venezuela (Simón Bolívar International Airport) (1991-2020 normals, extremes 1961-2020)
Month	Jan	Feb	Mar	Apr	May	Jun	Jul	Aug	Sep	Oct	Nov	Dec	Year
Record high °C (°F)	33.6 (92.5)	34.1 (93.4)	34.4 (93.9)	41.7 (107.1)	36.4 (97.5)	35.6 (96.1)	35.3 (95.5)	36.6 (97.9)	36.9 (98.4)	35.1 (95.2)	38.4 (101.1)	39.7 (103.5)	41.7 (107.1)
Mean daily maximum °C (°F)	30.4 (86.7)	30.4 (86.7)	30.5 (86.9)	32.0 (89.6)	32.4 (90.3)	32.1 (89.8)	31.9 (89.4)	32.4 (90.3)	32.7 (90.9)	32.2 (90.0)	31.9 (89.4)	30.9 (87.6)	31.6 (88.9)
Daily mean °C (°F)	25.5 (77.9)	25.5 (77.9)	26.1 (79.0)	27.3 (81.1)	28.0 (82.4)	27.7 (81.9)	27.4 (81.3)	27.9 (82.2)	28.2 (82.8)	27.9 (82.2)	27.4 (81.3)	26.2 (79.2)	27.1 (80.8)
Mean daily minimum °C (°F)	22.5 (72.5)	22.4 (72.3)	23.0 (73.4)	24.3 (75.7)	25.2 (77.4)	25.1 (77.2)	24.8 (76.6)	25.3 (77.5)	25.7 (78.3)	25.5 (77.9)	24.9 (76.8)	23.5 (74.3)	24.4 (75.9)
Record low °C (°F)	15.4 (59.7)	17.9 (64.2)	18.7 (65.7)	18.8 (65.8)	20.6 (69.1)	19.6 (67.3)	19.3 (66.7)	19.5 (67.1)	19.1 (66.4)	21.0 (69.8)	20.8 (69.4)	19.5 (67.1)	15.4 (59.7)
Average precipitation mm (inches)	56.7 (2.23)	50.2 (1.98)	18.9 (0.74)	35.2 (1.39)	44.6 (1.76)	62.2 (2.45)	79.2 (3.12)	95.8 (3.77)	90.0 (3.54)	101.5 (4.00)	107.2 (4.22)	108.6 (4.28)	850.1 (33.47)
Average precipitation days (≥ 1.0 mm)	4.0	2.7	1.6	3.5	4.6	6.6	8.2	9.0	7.7	8.1	7.0	6.6	69.6
Average relative humidity (%)	82	81	81	83	84	83	83	82	81	82	82	83	82
Mean monthly sunshine hours	232.5	218.4	241.8	183.0	201.5	207.0	241.8	244.9	228.0	207.7	195.0	210.8	2,612.4
Mean daily sunshine hours	7.5	7.8	7.8	6.1	6.5	6.9	7.8	7.9	7.6	6.7	6.5	6.8	7.2
Source: NOAA (humidity and sun 1961–1990)

== Sports ==
The city is home to the basketball team Bucaneros de La Guaira. The team plays its home games at the Polideportivo José María Vargas.
