= Valles del Tuy metropolitan area =

Valles del Tuy metropolitan area Area Metropolitana de los Valles del Tuy
- Conurbation
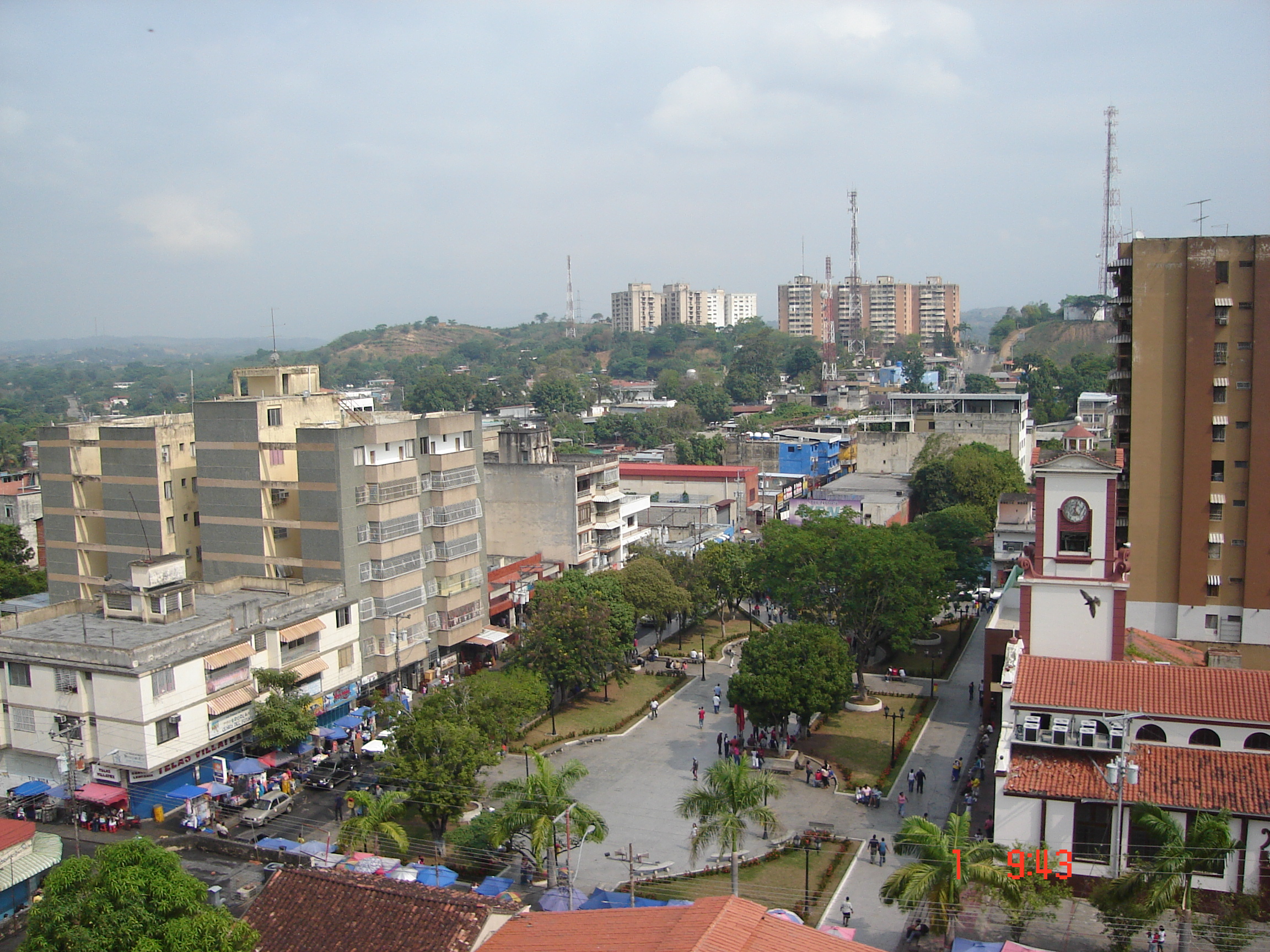
- Santa Teresa del Tuy

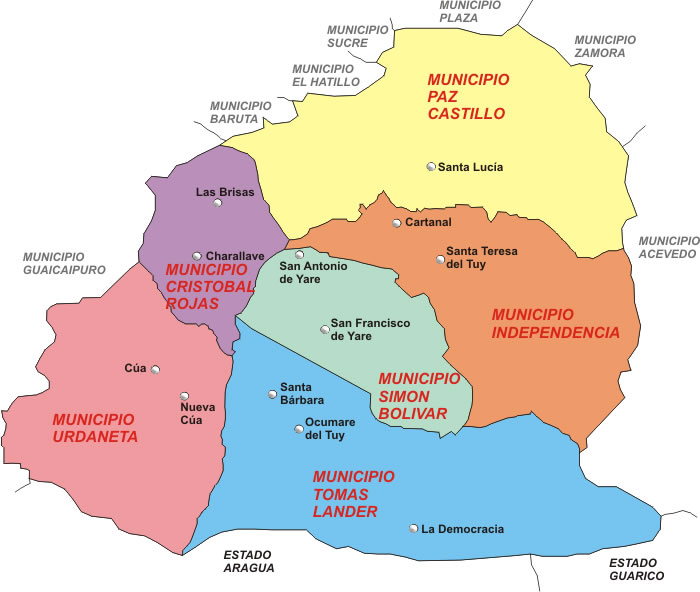
- Valles del Tuy metropolitan area
- Country: Venezuela
- State: Miranda
- Largest Cities: Ocumare del Tuy; Santa Teresa del Tuy; Cúa; Charallave; Santa Lucía; San Francisco de Yare

Area
  - Metro: 1,694 km^{2} (654 sq mi)

Population
  - Metro: 811,166
  - Metro density: 478.8/km^{2} (1,240/sq mi)
- Time zone: UTC-4:30 (VST)

The Valles del Tuy metropolitan area (Spanish: Area Metropolitana de los Valles del Tuy) is a metropolitan area in Miranda, Venezuela, that includes six municipalities, and is part of the Greater Caracas Area. It had a population of 811,166 inhabitants in 2016.

== Cities ==
The principal cities of the area are:

1. Ocumare del Tuy (pop. 127,027)
2. Cúa (pop. 110,449)
3. Santa Teresa del Tuy (pop. 86,299)
4. Charallave (pop. 75,106)
5. Santa Lucía (pop. approx. 70,000)
6. San Francisco de Yare (pop. 37,261)
7. Nueva Cúa (pop. 32,611)

== Municipalities ==
The six municipalities comprising the area are:

Municipality	Area (km^{2})	Population 2016	Population density 2016 (/km^{2})
Cristóbal Rojas	120	141,593	1,179.94
Independencia	284	157,961	556.20
Lander	478	170,728	357.19
Paz Castillo	408	124,671	305.57
Simón Bolívar	131	48,445	369.81
Urdaneta	273	167,768	614.53
Valles del Tuy metropolitan area	1,694	811,166	478.85

== Transportation ==
=== Rail ===
==== Caracas–Cúa branch ====
Train leaves General Ezequiel Zamora station, Cúa.

After 70 years without major improvements to the Venezuelan railway system the first of an ambitious plan that proposes many new lines, in particular, the Caracas–Cúa one of many Tuy Valley cities a distance of 41 km (25 mi) was opened for public service on October 15, 2006.

The route is part of the Ezequiel Zamora railway axis starts from Caracas and ends in Cúa Miranda State. The main terminal is located next to the Caracas Metro (subway) line 3 La Rinconada Terminal station. This short North-South line can be passenger travelled in approximately, 30 minutes, the following are the names of the 4 stations and the estimated travel time from Caracas and then the additional time to the next station. Also there is a delay time before the train restarts the trip which can be adjusted by management policy.

Station	Location		Travel time	Wait time
Libertador Simón Bolívar	Caracas	Federal District		
Generalísimo Francisco de Miranda	North Charallave	Miranda State	17 min	2 min
Don Simón Rodríguez	South Charallave	Miranda State	4 min	2 min
General Ezequiel Zamora	Cúa	Miranda State	10 min	

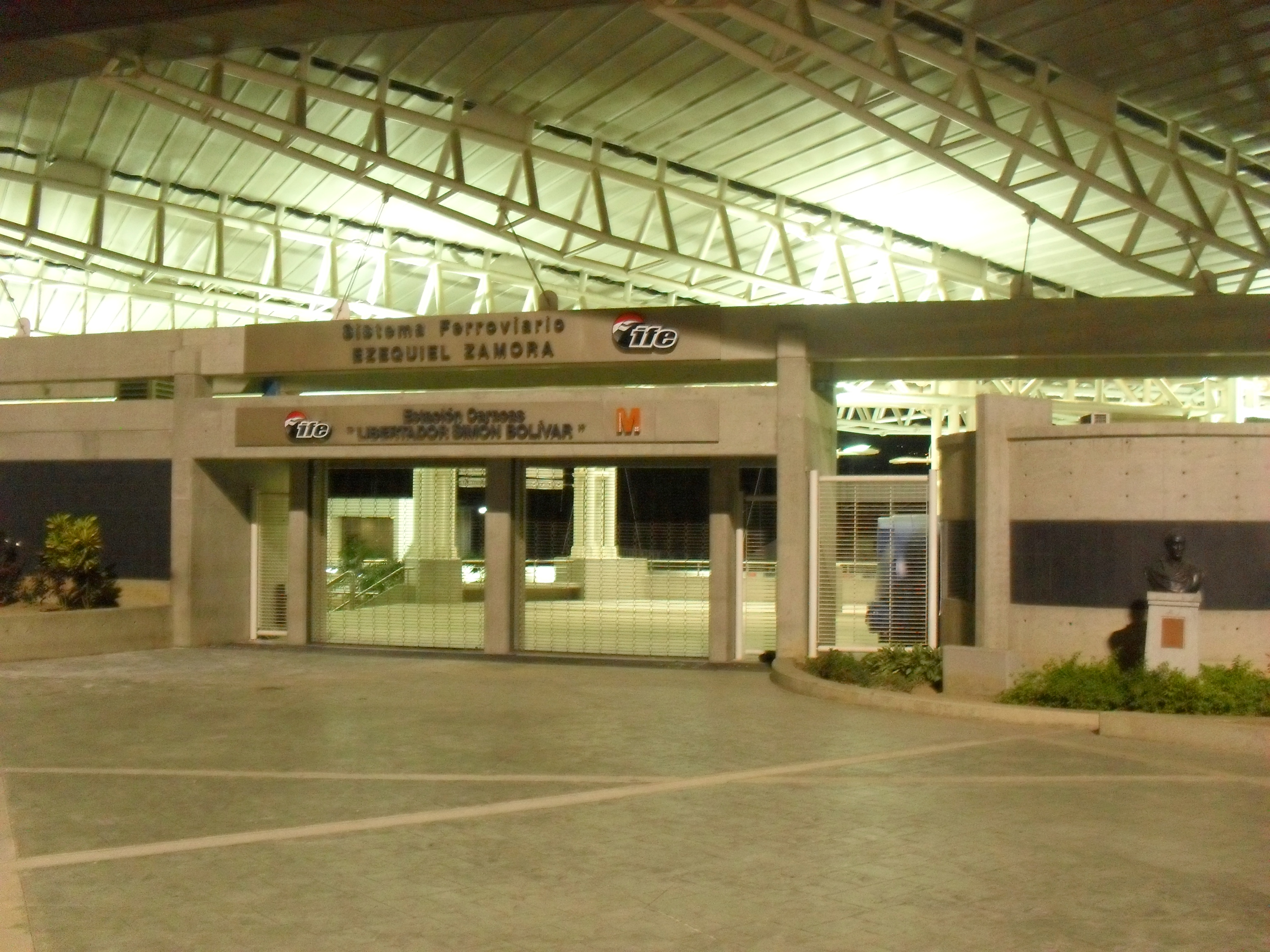
Libertador Simón Bolívar station, Caracas.

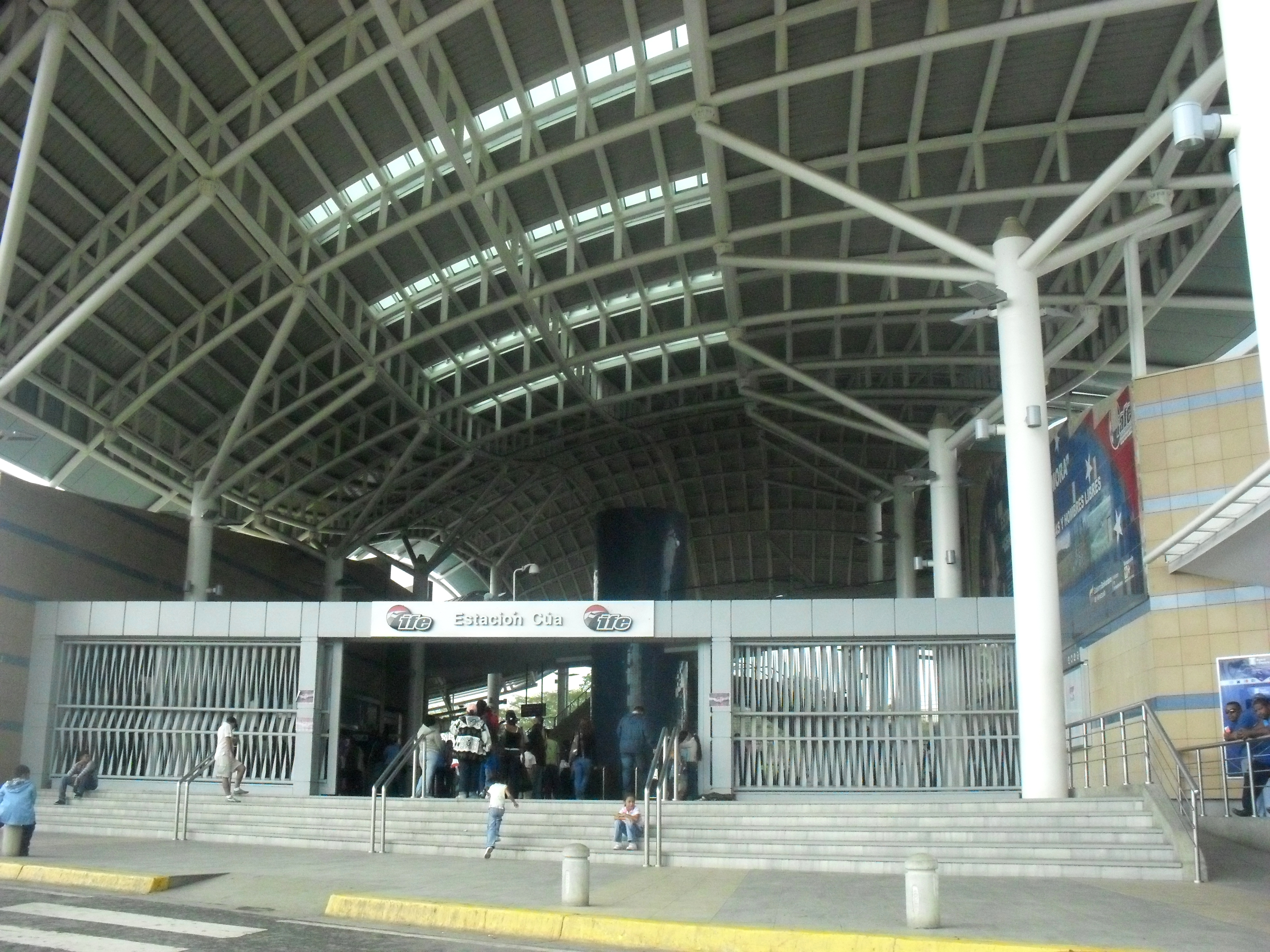
Ezequiel Zamora station, Cúa.

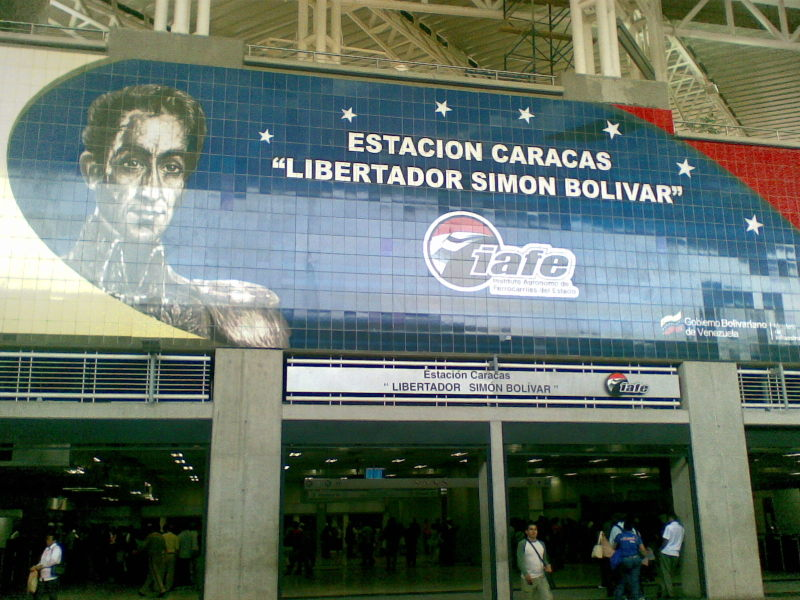
Libertador Simón Bolívar station.

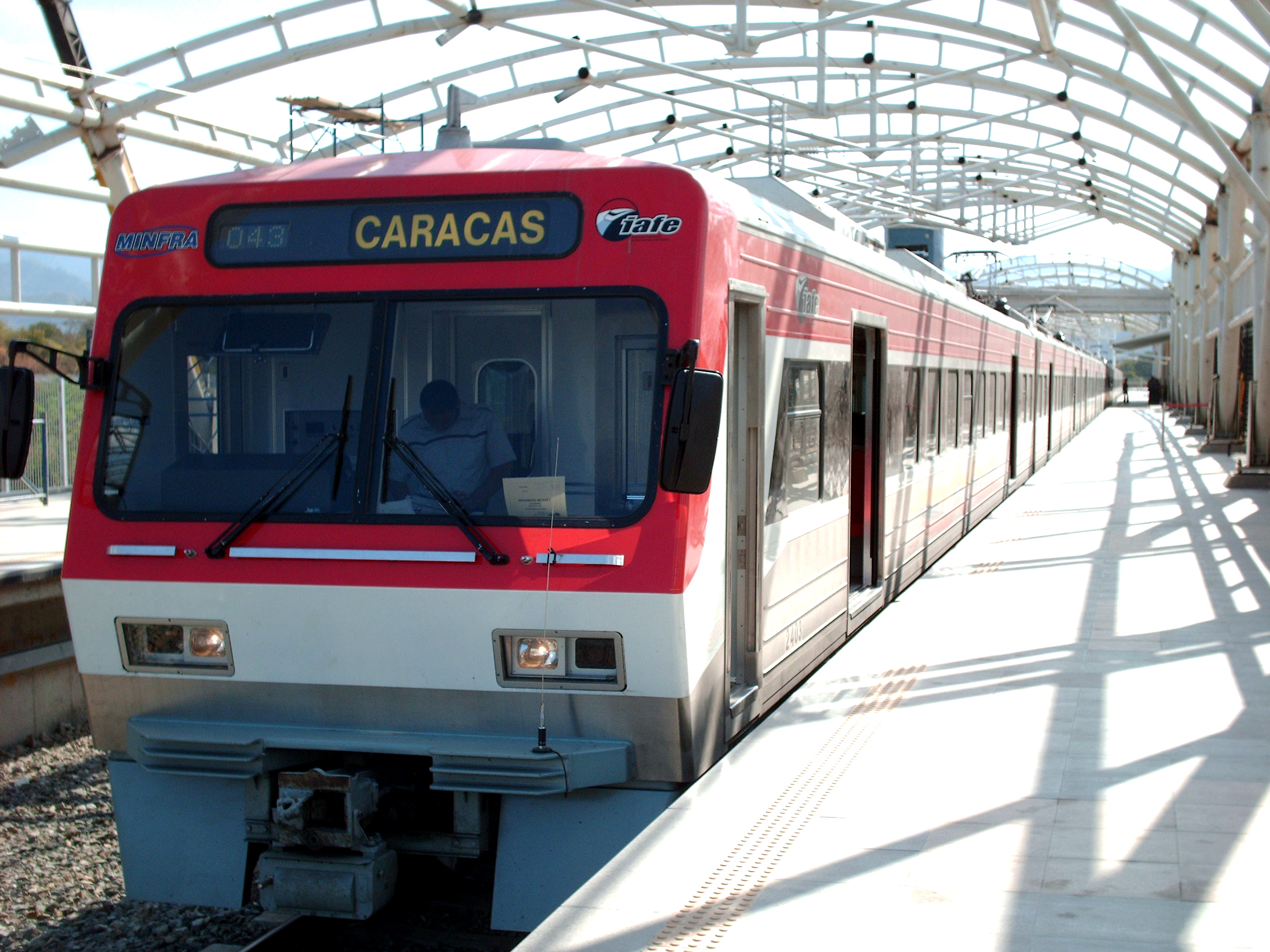
Cua station, commuter train for local passengers.

== See also ==
- Greater Caracas
- List of metropolitan areas of Venezuela
