= Valles del Tuy =

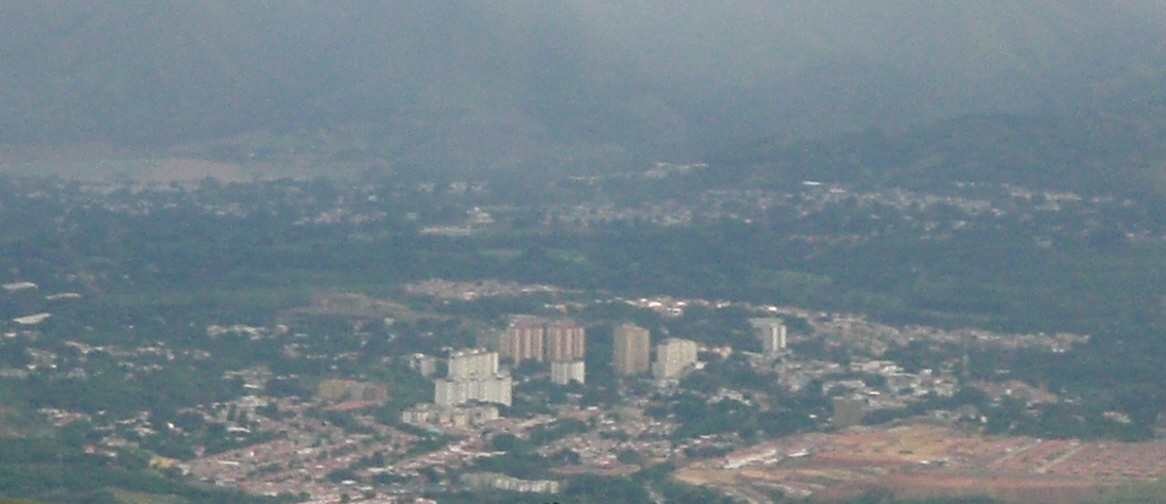
- Cúa, a town in the Tuy Valleys

- Location within Venezuela
- Long-axis direction: E-W

Geography
- Coordinates: 10°14′00″N 66°51′00″W
- Interactive map of Valles del Tuy

The Valles del Tuy (Tuy Valleys) is a region of Venezuela, covering several municipalities in the north-central Miranda State. It is in the area around the Tuy River, one of the most important rivers of that state, a valley between the Cordillera de la Costa (north) and the Serrania del Interior (south). The area is also considered one of the five subregions of Miranda state, though without any official organization or administrative group. It holds the Valles del Tuy Metropolitan Area.

The adjective and demonym of Tuy (Tuyan) in Spanish is tuyero. The tuyero is also a local musical genre, also known as joropo tuyero and golpe tuyero.
