= Dancing devils of Corpus Christi =

Venezuelan religious festivals

Dancing devils of Corpus Christi Diablos danzantes de Corpus Christi
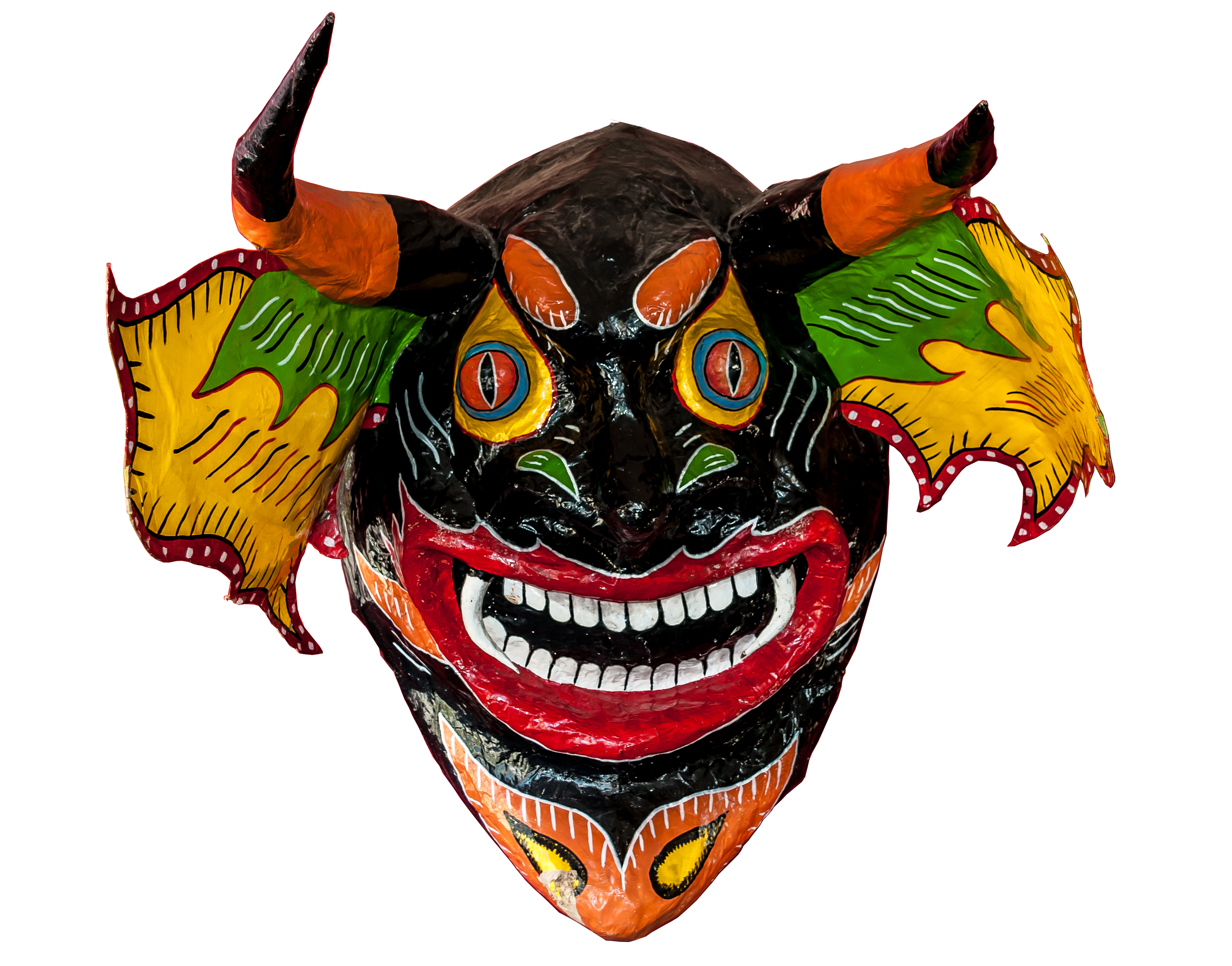
- Date: Corpus Christi
- Frequency: Annually
- Country: Venezuela

Venezuela's Dancing Devils of Corpus Christi
- UNESCO Intangible Cultural Heritage
- Country: Venezuela
- Reference: 00639
- Region: Latin America and the Caribbean

Inscription history
- Inscription: 2012 (7th session)
- List: Representative

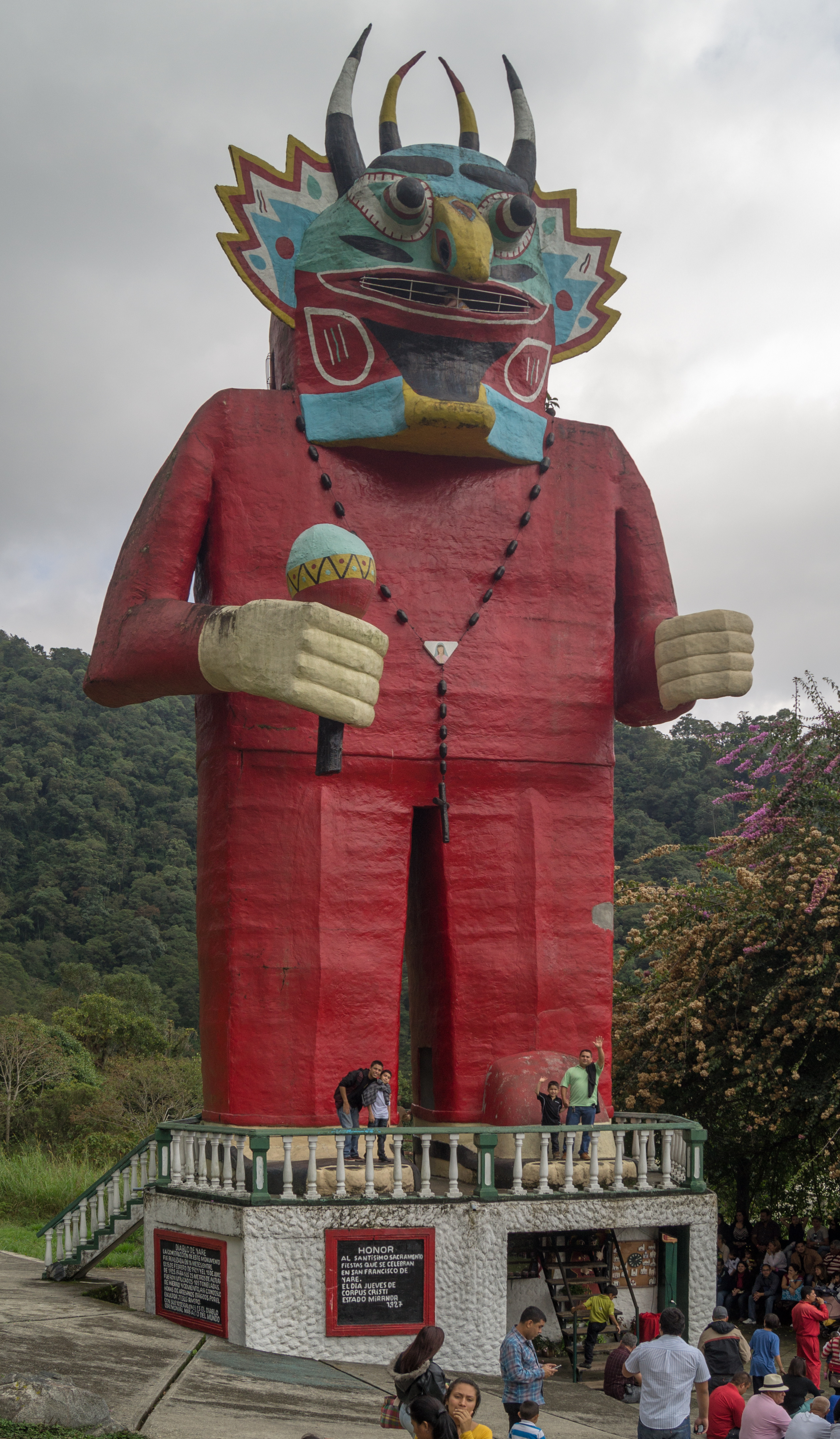
25 meter tall monument to Dancing Devils of Yare, at Venezuela de Antier in Mérida, Venezuela. Constructed 1924–25.

Dancing Devils of Corpus Christi refers to a set of popular Venezuelan religious festivals held on Corpus Christi, celebrating the presence of Christ in the Eucharist. It generally refers to the practices of 11 brotherhoods in various regions, which include more than 5,000 people, among which the best-known is the Dancing Devils of Yare. These manifestations were recognized by UNESCO as Intangible Cultural Heritage in 2012.

== History ==
The brotherhood groups originated in the mid seventeenth century on the Aragua and Vargas state farms. As early as 1749, Corpus Christi was celebrated and men, women and children dressed as devils to fulfill promises made to the Blessed Sacrament.

Different origins have been attributed to the Dancing Devils of Corpus Christi. According to a story about the San Francisco de Yare brotherhood, 400 years ago, a priest without the means to hold the procession of Corpus Christi said: "If there is no money nor believers to carry the Blessed Sacrament in procession, then the devils come!" After a storm, several devils presented themselves in front of the church.

Regarding other stories about the Yare brotherhoods are, some references are in the novel Peonía by the writer Manuel Vicente Romero Garcia, describing in a clear and illustrative manner how the dancers were Cúa devils in the 1870s.

== Brotherhoods ==
There are 11 groups recognized as guilds, societies or associations which constitute hierarchies to dance annually and make promises to worship the Blessed Sacrament. All are independent organizations established in their respective communities. In contemporary times, groups have organized non-profit associations that access public and private funding to improve their organizational strategies and reach a wider audience.

- Dancing Devils of Yare
- Dancing Devils of Ocumare de la Costa
- Dancing Devils of Cata
- Dancing Devils of Cuyagua
- Dancing Devils of Turiamo
- Dancing Devils of Chuao
- Dancing Devils of Patanemo
- Dancing Devils of San Rafael de Orituco
- Dancing Devils of Tinaquillo
- Dancing Devils of San Millán
- Dancing Devils of Naiguatá

Trying to reach a degree of organizational strength, several fraternities held a series of "national meetings," each located in a different community. As a result, the National Association of Dancing Devils of Corpus Christi was created to bring together most of the existing fraternities.

== Yare ==
The Dancing Devils of Yare (Diablos Danzantes del Yare) is the name of a religious festival celebrated in San Francisco de Yare, in the state of Miranda, Venezuela, on the day of Corpus Christi. The Sociedades del Santísimo (Societies of the Holiest) are in charge of the celebration. Its origins are traced back to the 18th century, being the oldest brotherhood of the American continent.

Every Corpus Christi (nine Thursdays after Holy Thursday), a ritual dance is performed by the so-called "Dancing Devils," who wear colorful garments (commonly all red), layers of stripped fabric, masks of grotesque appearance and also accessories like crosses, scapulars, rosaries and other sorts of amulets.

The fraternity of the devils is divided in hierarchical order, represented by their masks.

There are other expressions in this particular festival named according to the location, such as the Devils of Naiguatá and the Devils of Chuao.

=== Procession and dress code ===
Dancing Devils of Yare original Masks

In this folkloric festival, devotion is given to the patron saint Saint Francis of Paola and to Jesus Christ in the Blessed Sacrament. The celebration starts Wednesday with a wake where fulías (a native music style) are played, décimas (native form of poetry) are recited and rosaries and other prayers are recited until dawn. The next day the devoted, disguised as devils, perform dances around the main town square. They also parade through the streets, dressed in their red costumes and masks, dancing to the rhythm of corríos (octosyllabic musical poems).

Later on, the group moves towards the front of the church and when the mass has ended, the Eucharist is placed at the church's entrance and a sort of fight representation begins between the devils and the guardians. Finally, the devils surrender and kneel in front of the Eucharist to show submission, dancing to the rhythm of the bamba, a music style that is more reverential. The entire performance represents the victory of Good over Evil. The dancing devils wear red shirts, trousers and stockings, a mask depicting a devil, and canvas sandals. They carry a cross made out of blessed palm leaves, a rosary, and a medallion with the image of Christ (that can be substituted by another Christian religious image). They also carry in one hand a devil-shaped maraca, and in the other, a whip.
