= Cartanal =

- Location within Venezuela
- Country: Venezuela
- State: Miranda State

Cartanal is a town in the state of Miranda, Venezuela. The civil parish was founded on 15 August 1991.
