= Simón Bolívar Municipality, Miranda =

Simón Bolívar Municipality Municipio Simón Bolívar
- Municipality
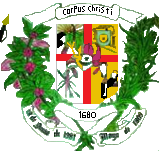
- Flag Coat of arms

- Location in Miranda

- Location in Venezuela
- Coordinates: 10°11′02″N 66°44′37″W
- Country: Venezuela
- State: Miranda
- Municipal seat: San Francisco de Yare

Government
  - Mayor: Saúl Yánez (PSUV)

Area
  - Total: 114.7 km^{2} (44.3 sq mi)

Population (2007)
  - Total: 40,730
  - Density: 355.1/km^{2} (919.7/sq mi)
- Time zone: UTC−4 (VET)
- Area code(s): 0239
- Website: Official website

Simón Bolívar Municipality is one of the 21 municipalities (municipios) that makes up the Venezuelan state of Miranda and, according to a 2007 population estimate by the National Institute of Statistics of Venezuela, the municipality has a population of 40,730. The town of San Francisco de Yare is the shire town of the Simón Bolívar Municipality. The municipality is one of several in Venezuela named "Simón Bolívar Municipality" in honour of Venezuelan independence hero Simón Bolívar.

== Demographics ==
The Simón Bolívar Municipality, according to a 2007 population estimate by the National Institute of Statistics of Venezuela, has a population of 40,730 (up from 34,454 in 2000). This amounts to 1.4% of the state's population. The municipality's population density is 310.92 inhabitants per square kilometre (805.3/sq mi).

== Government ==
The mayor of the Simón Bolívar Municipality is Justo Hernández, elected on October 31, 2004, with 32% of the vote. He replaced Armando Vargas shortly after the elections. The municipality is divided into two parishes; San Francisco de Yare and San Antonio de Yare.
