= Miranda (state) =

Miranda State Estado Miranda
- State of Venezuela
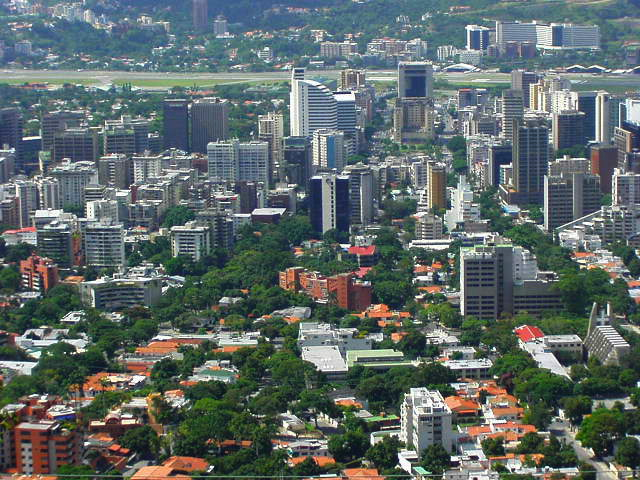
- View of Chacao, part of Caracas

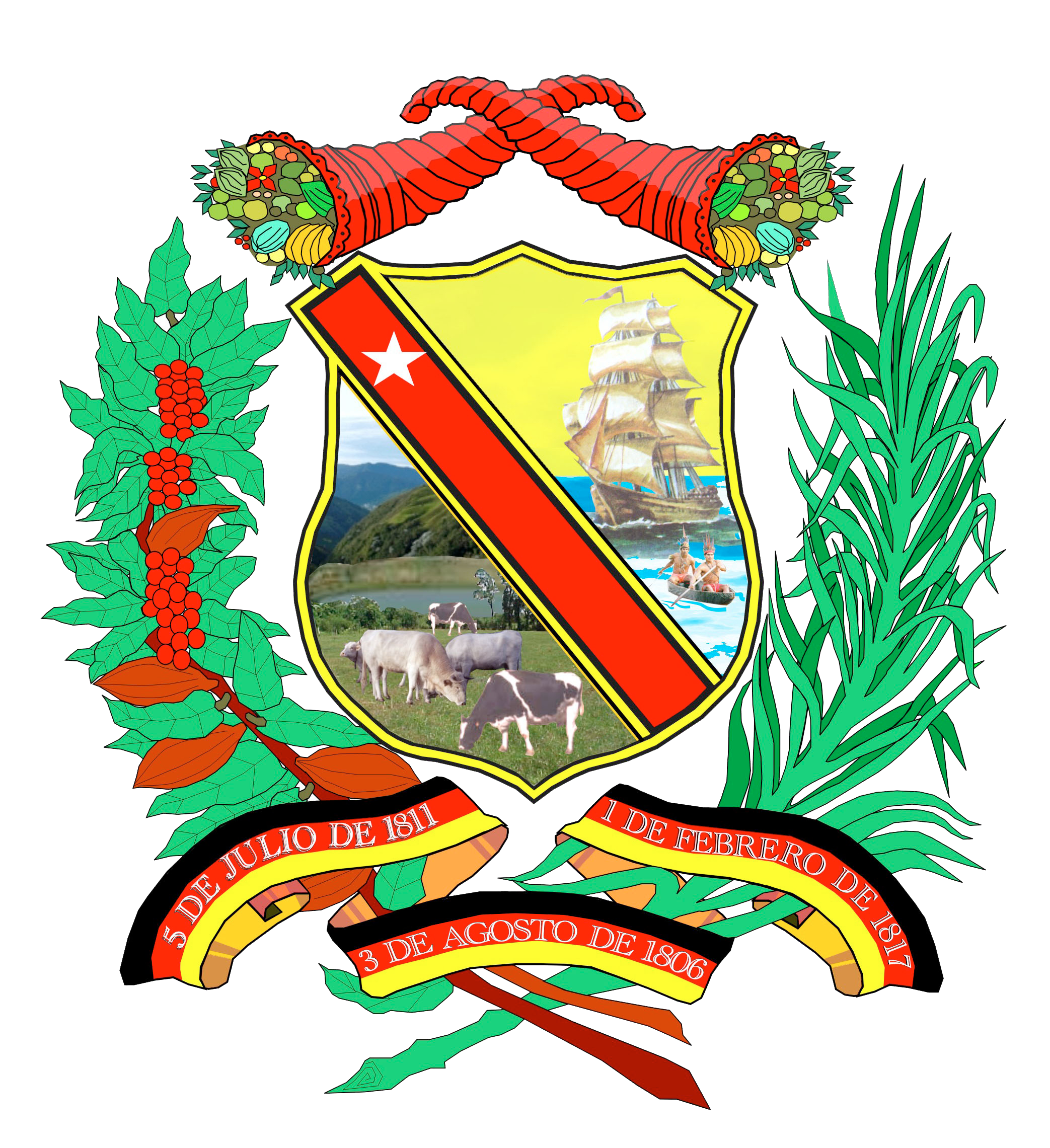
- Flag Coat of arms
- Anthem: Himno del Estado Miranda
- Location within Venezuela
- Interactive map of Miranda State
- Coordinates: 10.28°N 66.33°W
- Country: Venezuela
- Created: 1909
- Named for: Francisco de Miranda
- Capital: Los Teques

Government
  - Body: Legislative Council
  - Governor: Elio Serrano

Area
  - Total: 7,950 km^{2} (3,070 sq mi)
  - Rank: 17th
- 0.87% of Venezuela

Population (2016)
  - Total: 3,222,374
  - Rank: 2nd
  - Density: 405/km^{2} (1,050/sq mi)
- 10.36% of Venezuela
- Time zone: UTC−4 (VET)
- ISO 3166 code: VE-M
- Emblematic tree: Roso blanco (Brownea leucantha)
- HDI (2019): 0.744 high · 2nd
- Website: www.miranda.gob.ve

Miranda State (Spanish: Estado Miranda, IPA: [esˈtaðo miˈɾanda]) is one of the 23 states of Venezuela and the second most populous after Zulia State. The most recent population estimate was 3,194,390 in mid-2016. It has the greatest Human Development Index in Venezuela, according to the Venezuelan National Institute of Statistics.

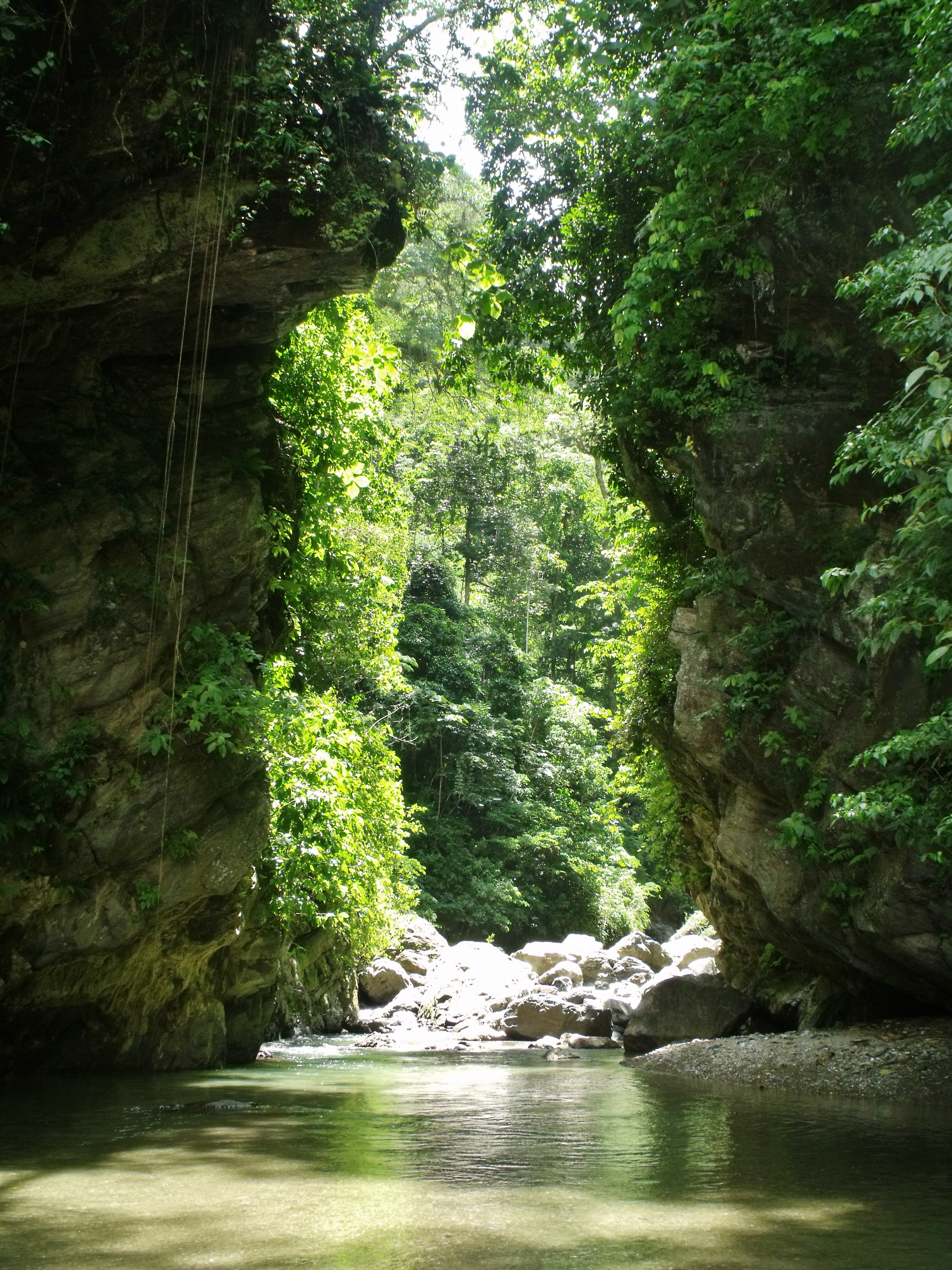
Piedras Gemelas, Salmerón, El Ávila National Park

Miranda is an important center for political, economic, cultural and commercial activities. The state is administered by a governor, and is sub-divided into 21 municipalities, each under a mayor.

Miranda State covers a total surface area of 7,950 km^{2} (3,070 sq mi).

== History ==
=== Pre-Columbian history ===
When the Spanish arrived, the region was inhabited by various Caribbean tribes. Among them were the Caracas, the Teques, the Cumanagotos, the Mariches and the Quiriquires. The Teques inhabited the southwestern part of Guaire. The Mariches inhabited the eastern part of the Caracas Valley. They practiced hunting and gathering, while others lived by fishing. When the Spanish conquistadors arrived, these tribes were brave enough to fight for their territory, commanded by caciques like Guaicaipuro and Yare.

=== Spanish colonization ===
Guaicaipuro was a legendary cacique of the Teques and Caracas Indians who resisted the conquistador Diego de Losada, while cacique Yare was the Cumanagoto, Quiriquire, Charagoto and Arauco chief who killed Captain Mendoza, who had murdered the Indian Tamanaco. Once all the tribes were subdued, the Spaniards settled completely on these lands, founding the city of Caracas, and later different towns in the interior of the state of Miranda.

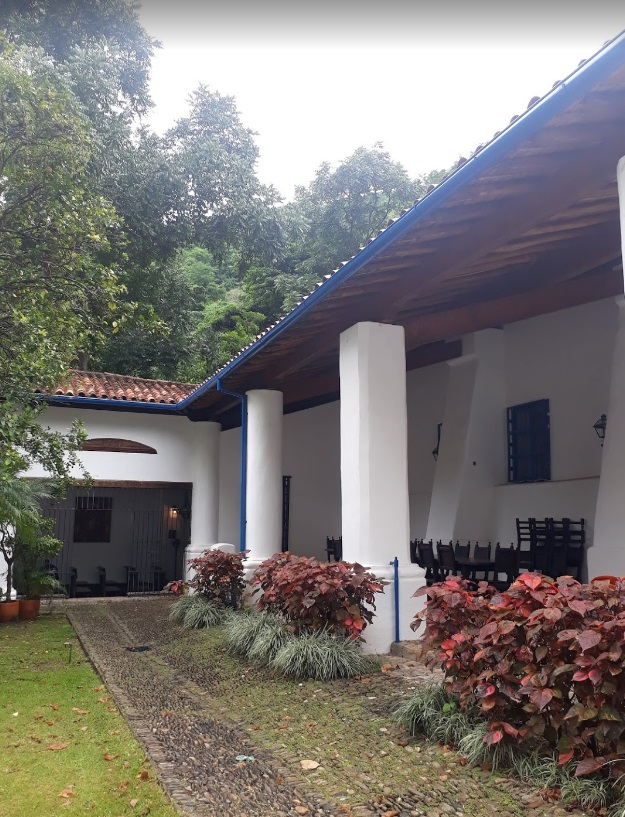
Colonial Hacienda in Izcaragua

During the colonial era, this region became part of the Province of Caracas. At the end of the 16th century and beginning of the 17th century the highlands were used to cultivate, among other products, wheat destined largely for export to Cartagena de Indias and the Caribbean islands. From the second decade of the 17th century, cocoa displaced these crops. All commercial activities were monopolized by the Royal Guipuzcoa Company, which generated the first discontents and uprisings against the crown. From the beginning of the 17th century, slave labour quickly replaced the Indian labour force, concentrating on the Windward region, which was the largest cocoa producer. It was in this region that the first free blacks rose up against their masters, but were later stifled by Spanish troops.

=== 19th century ===
After the dissolution of Gran Colombia, Venezuela still used the provinces as a political-territorial organization, which had been used for a long time. Miranda, at that time, was part of a province. Between 1832 and 1855 the use of the province persisted due to the confusion generated by the existence of a state as a political division of the country.

The division by states did not appear in Venezuela in a concrete way until 1864, when about twenty states were founded which, in the following governments, would be reduced to nine; among these was the state of Guzmán Blanco, which by 1873 only covered the region of Aragua.

Miranda in 1889-1898

In 1881, the State of Guzmán Blanco expanded its territory to include the region of Miranda, among other nearby regions that were included as part of Guárico.

In 1889, the territory of the Guzmán Blanco State was again modified by the Constitution, and its size was reduced by excluding several regions of the country such as the region of Aragua, but renaming the State as Edo Miranda.

=== 20th and 21st centuries ===
In 1900, by decree of General Cipriano Castro, the state of Caracas was included in Miranda. Caracas was renamed Miranda State with the provisional capital in Santa Lucía. In 1901, the political-territorial space was modified again and the capital of the state became Petare, and in 1904 it was changed to Ocumare del Tuy.

In 1909 the last important modification was made, changing the capital to Los Teques.

In 1982, the municipality of Los Salias was founded through the Official Gazette of the State of Miranda.

In 1989, after the decentralization carried out by President Carlos Andrés Perez, Arnaldo Arocha was elected the first governor by popular vote.

In October 2017, Héctor Rodríguez Castro was elected governor of the State of Miranda, after facing Carlos Ocariz in an election.

=== Chronology ===
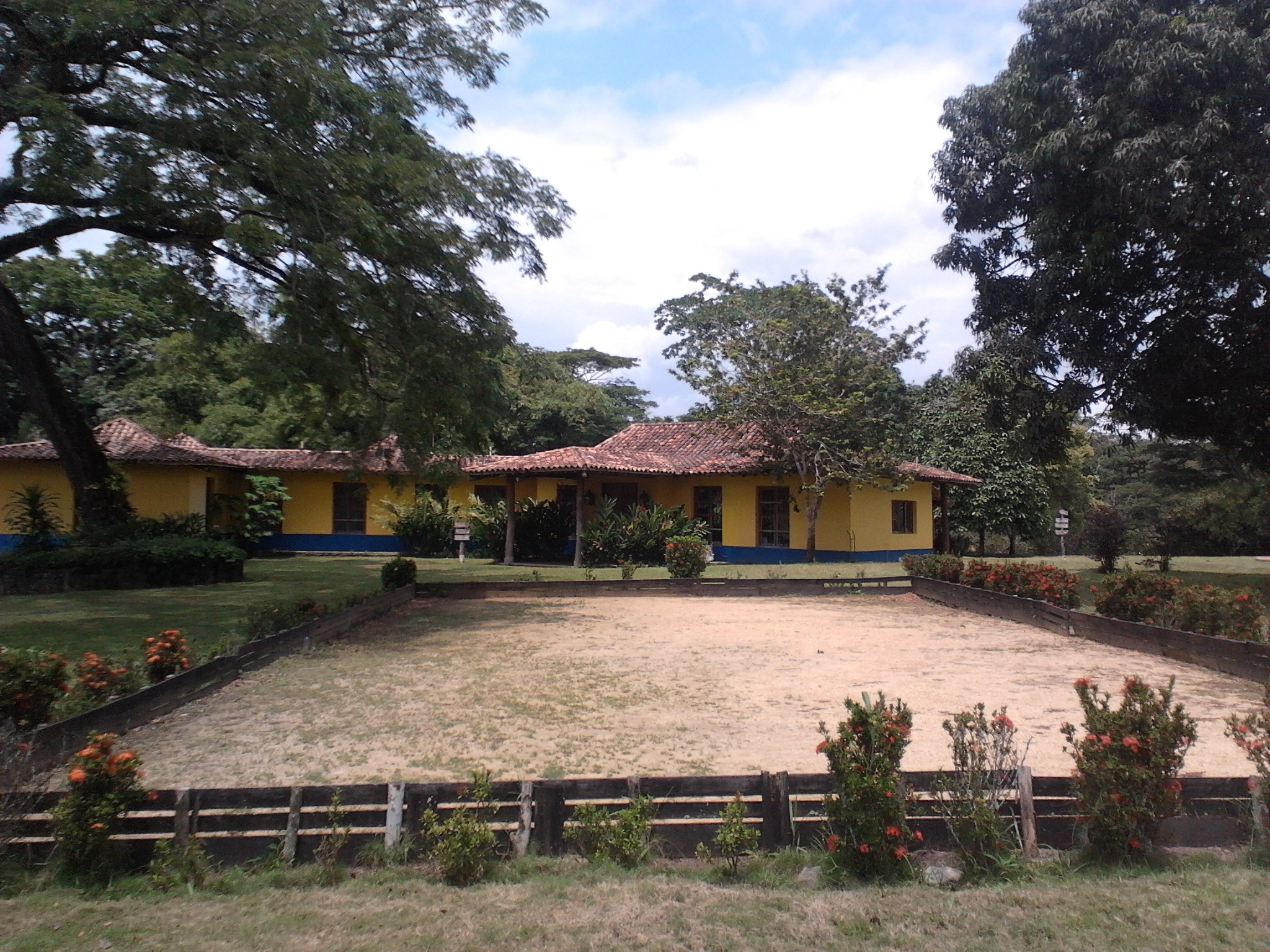
Colonial architecture in Caucagua, Municipality of Acevedo

- In 1568 the mayor of Caracas, Francisco de Infante, killed the cacique Guaicaipuro, representative of the indigenous resistance in Venezuela.
- In 1572 another of the men who fought against the Spanish conquest, the cacique Tamanaco, was also killed by the conquistadors.
- In 1580 a smallpox epidemic breaks out, brought from Guinea by the black slaves, which ends the life of 20,000 aborigines in three years.
- In 1620 the process of founding new cities begins.
- In 1812 the royalists offered freedom to black slaves who took up arms against the Republicans. A general rebellion by the blacks caused panic among the landowners and led to the fall of the regime.
- In 1861, a wave of fighting broke out between the conservatives and the Feds.
- In 1841, the Federal Constitution created Miranda as an autonomous entity.
- In 1884, a plague of locusts swept through Miranda and, as the shade trees withered, ruined the coffee and cocoa plantations.
- In 1886, the Venezuelan Central Railroad entered service.
- In 1891 a new division of Miranda became part of the State of Guzmán Blanco, together with the provinces of Caracas, Aragua, Guarico and Nueva Esparta.
- In 1891 the first census was taken, more than 165,000 people lived in the current cantons of Miranda.
- In 1892, during the Legalist Revolution, various battles took place in the region between the forces of Joaquín Crespo and Raimundo Andueza Palacio.
- In 1893 the state of Miranda was formed, with the territories of Caracas (with the current state of Miranda), Guárico and Nueva Esparta.
- In 1894, the Great Venezuelan Railroad entered service.
- In 1897 the Compañía Anónima Electricidad de Caracas founded two years before by the engineer Ricardo Zuloaga installed the first hydroelectric station known as "El Encantado" located between the towns of Petare and Guarenas, thus initiating the stage of electric lighting of the city of Caracas.
- In 1899, the Mirandina territory was included in the province of Caracas.
- In 1900, by decree of General Cipriano Castro, the state of Caracas was renamed the state of Miranda, with Santa Lucía as its provisional capital.
- In 1901 a new territorial division was proclaimed that maintained the state of Miranda, with Petare as its capital.
- In 1904 the state of Miranda was maintained, with the capital in Ocumare del Tuy.
- In 1907 an iron bridge was built in Ocumare over the Tuy River, a remarkable work of engineering for the time.
- In 1909 the state of Miranda was structured as it is today, but with its capital in Ocumare del Tuy, later Los Teques was designated the capital of the state.

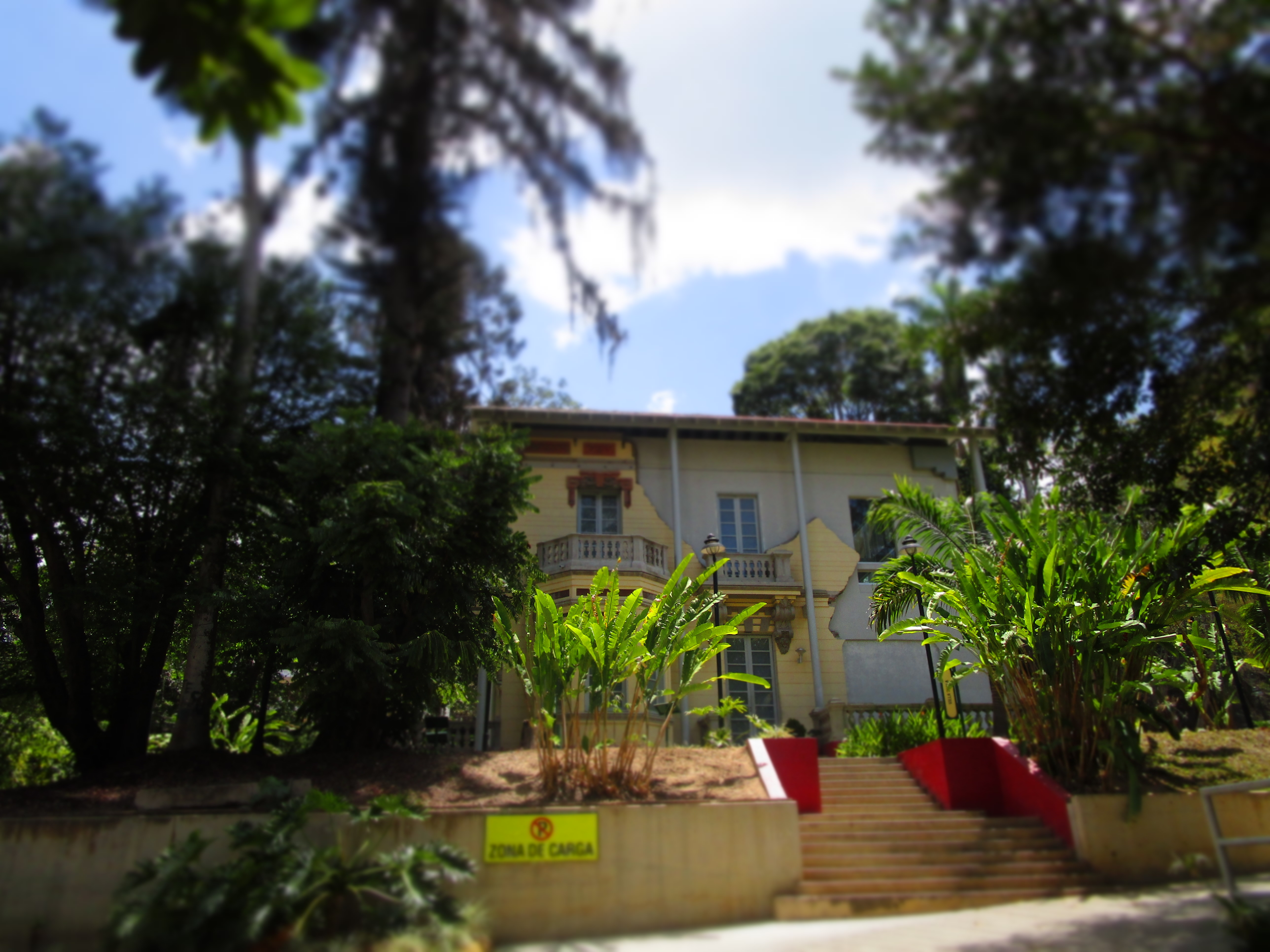
Villa Teola, Los Teques, completed in 1913 and declared a Municipal Historical Heritage site in 1982.

- In 1924 the first modern paper factory in Venezuela was installed in El Encantado.
- In 1927, the Legislative Assembly orders that the capital of the state of Miranda be moved to Los Teques.
- In 1948, according to the Law, the political-administrative division of Miranda State includes 10 districts and 35 municipalities.
- In 1957, the thermoelectric plant of La Mariposa, to supply energy for the pumping of water to Caracas, was put into service.
- In 1958, Guatopo National Park was established.
- In 1967, a 6.5 Richter scale earthquake occurred, leaving 240 dead, hundreds injured and great material losses. On Dec. 5, the Legislative Assembly of Miranda State created the Independence district, with its capital in Santa Teresa del Tuy.
- In February 1989, general protests began to emerge in Guarenas due to the rise in public transport prices, which then spread to the whole country, degenerating into an uncontrolled wave of looting, called El Caracazo.
- In 1992, the state of Miranda was organized in 21 municipalities and 55 parishes.
- In 1999, heavy rains caused havoc in the region of El Guapo when the dam of the same name broke.
- In 2000, four municipalities of Miranda were integrated into the Metropolitan District of Caracas, but still part of the state of Miranda.

== Geography ==
=== Location ===
The state of Miranda is located in the north-central part of Venezuela. It is part of the Capital Region together with the Capital District and the state of La Guaira. It is located in the central coastal area of the country.

It borders on the north with the Federal District, on the south with the states of Guarico and Aragua, on the east with the Caribbean Sea and on the west with Aragua.

The terrain is predominantly rugged and abrupt, with high slopes and narrow valleys within the mountains. The eastern sector constitutes a depression in the Serranía del Litoral. The Guaire River, which runs through the city of Caracas, divides the sector into two strips that are differentiated by their decline: the Valles del Tuy and La Depresión de Barlovento.

The waters that make up the hydrographic network of the state are mostly short course. The main river basin in the State is that of the River Tuy. The availability of water resources in the state is precarious, as the state is located in the largest urban conglomerate in the country. The volume of available water is committed to supply almost the entire metropolitan district of Caracas, as well as the entire territory of Mirandina, which is poorly supplied by the reservoirs of La Mariposa, Lagartijo, La Pereza, Ocumarito, Agua Fría, Taguaza, El Guapo and Quebrada Seca. Many of the towns in the state are not frequently supplied with drinking water due to the high consumption of water resources. The Guaire, Tuy and Grande rivers are not used because they are in a state of contamination.

=== Hydrography ===
The hydrography of Miranda State is characterized by the short course and low flow of its rivers, with the exception of the Tuy. This characteristic, combined with the settlement of the largest mass of population in the country, gives its rivers great significance as sources of water for urban consumption. The Tuy River, with a length of 250 km, rises at an altitude of 2,100 m, on the southern flank of the Litoral mountain range, flows eastwards through the Abra de Tácata to the Tuy and Barlovento valleys, and flows into the Caribbean Sea through the Paparo mouth.

The El Jarillo River and the Aguas Frías and La Negra streams, tributaries of the Tuy on the left bank, have been dammed, near the Teques, in the Agua Fría reservoir, while the Ocumare, was dammed near Ocumare del Tuy, in the Ocumarito reservoir. The best known tributary is the Guaire River. On the right bank, the Tuy receives the Taguaza, Taguacita and Cuira rivers. Other important rivers are the Guarenas, Rio Grande or Caucagua, Capaya, El Guapo, Pacairigua, El Curiepe and Cúpira.

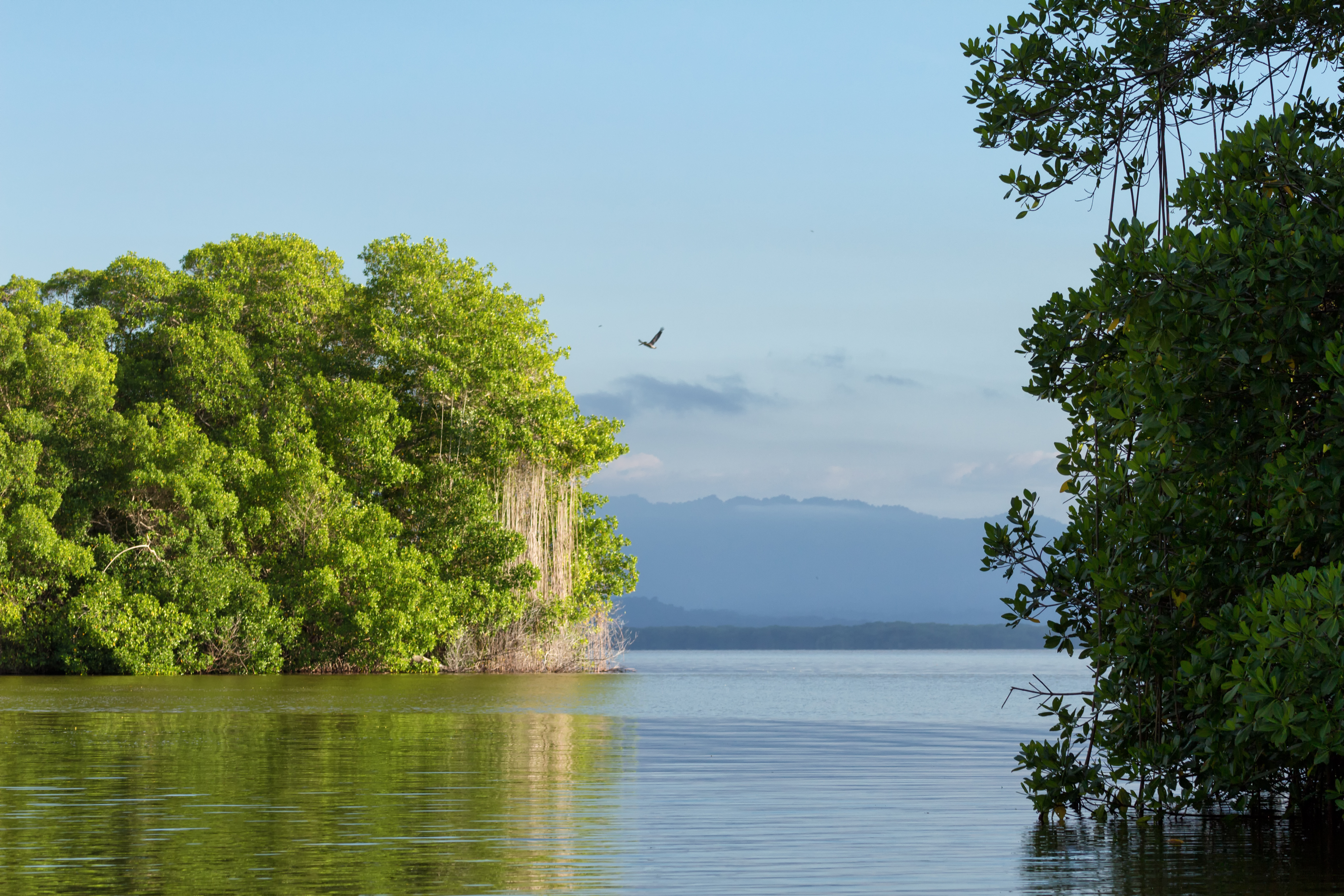
Tacarigua Lagoon National Park

=== Climate ===
The climate of Miranda State is very hot in the low areas with temperatures ranging from 20 °C to 42 °C with very high humidity in the coastal region of Barlovento. In the Altos Mirandinos region, temperatures vary slightly throughout the year. In the dry season (December–March), temperatures vary between 10 °C and 23 °C. In the beginning of the wet season (April, May) high temperatures can be registered up to 33 °C. The rest of the year it varies between 16 °C and 25 °C.

=== Soil ===
The state of Miranda has soils with a high agricultural vocation that have been used since colonial times for the cultivation of cocoa, fruits, vegetables, cereals and other subsistence crops. However, the pressure of urban and industrial activities, especially the settlement of high population concentrations, has meant a loss of very considerable agricultural areas in the Tuy Valleys, in the Guarenas and Guatire area, and in the Barlovento region.

=== Fauna ===
In mountainous areas, rivers and streams, it is common to see mammals such as the raccoon (Didelphis marsupialis) and the spiny rat (Proechimys sp.), the squirrel (Sciurus granatensis), the mountain buckthorn (Dasypus novemcinctus), the porcupine (Coendou prehensilis), the agouti (Dasyprocta leporina), the sloth (Bradypus tridactylus) very common in all areas of the municipality, the rabbit (Sylvilagus brasiliensis), and the one that has almost disappeared from the municipal area, the matacan deer (Mazama americana) that was common in the area of Turgua.

At night it is common to observe bats, among which the list bat (Saccopteryx bilineata), common fruit bat (Artibeus jamaicensis), common vampire bat (Desmodus rotundus), and house bat (Molossus molossus) stand out. In the area of Los Carraos and Zuloaga caves, the insectivorous bat species Natalus tumidirostris, Myotis keaysi and Tadarida aurispinosa have been identified.

=== Flora ===
Among the common trees to find in the forest are, the ladle or child (Gyranthera caribensis), the bitter cedar (Cedrela mexicana), milky of the genus Sapium (Sapium stylare), yagrumo (Cecropia peltata), yagrumo male (Didymopanax morototoni), bucare (Erythrina poeppigiana), ceiba (Ceiba pentandra), indio desnudo (Bursera simaruba); in some parts of the state the native flora has been intervened and replaced by fruit trees such as guamo (Inga fastuosa), mango (Mangifera indica), orange (Citrus × sinensis), mandarin (Citrus × tangerina), guava (Psidium guajava), pomarosa (Syzygium jambos), avocado (Persea americana) and cambur (Musa × paradisiaca).

In the urban area it is common to see different types of ornamental trees, among which we can highlight the eucalyptus (Eucalyptus camaldulensis), apamates (Tabebuia rosea), araguaneyes (Tabebuia chrysantha), mahoganies (Swietenia macrophylla), soaps (Hura crepitans), kujis (Acacia farnesiana), samans (Pithecellobium saman), bamboos (Bambusa vulgaris), riqui riquis (Heliconia latispatha) and tapir nails (Philodendron)

== Politics and government ==
The state of Miranda, as a federal entity, has its own charter, the Constitution of the State of Miranda, which is the basis of the state's legal system and was approved in 2006.

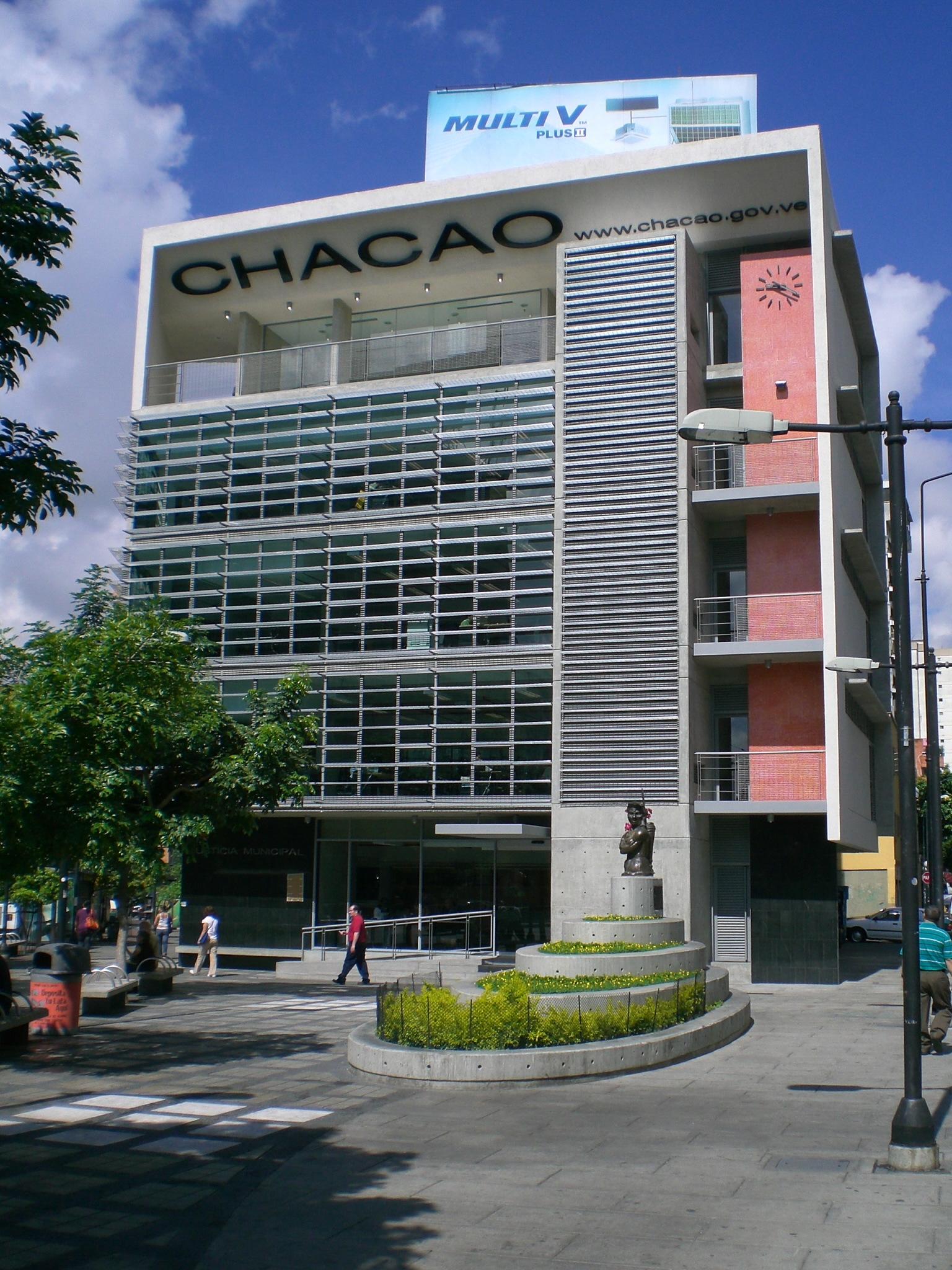
The municipal Justice building, Chacao Municipality

=== Executive power ===
The executive branch is composed of a governor and a council of secretaries who assist him in the management of government and are freely appointed and removable officials. The governor is elected by the people by direct and secret vote for a period of four years with the possibility of re-election for new periods, being in charge of the state administration.

Until 1988, the governor was appointed by the president of the republic. In 1989, the first direct regional elections were held in the country.

The current governor is Hector Rodriguez. He was elected in October 2017 with 52.78% of the votes.

=== Legislative power ===
The Legislative Power is represented by the unicameral Legislative Council of the State of Miranda, elected by the people through a direct and secret vote every four years. They can be re-elected for new consecutive periods, under a system of proportional representation of the population of the state and its municipalities.

The PSUV currently has 15 legislators. Since the 2012 regional elections the PSUV has a majority of 8 legislators against 7 from the Democratic Unity Roundtable. The President of the Legislative Council is Legislator Aurora Morales and the Vice President is Legislator Miguel Mora.

=== Police ===
Miranda State has its own autonomous police force, which is known as Polimiranda (Miranda State Police), created in 1996 as the Autonomous Police Institute of Miranda State. Its current director is Major General Regulo Argotte Prieto.

== Administrative divisions ==
Municipalities of Miranda State

The State of Miranda, as a federal entity with constitutional rank, has its own Constitution, (Constitución del Estado Miranda, the Constitution of the State of Miranda). It has two branches of public power: the Executive (Governor of Miranda) and the Legislative (Legislative Council).

Autonomous bodies such as the State Comptroller's Office and the Attorney General's Office are established. The other three depend on the National Power as the Judicial (Miranda State Judicial District), Electoral (Miranda State Electoral Office) and Citizen.

Its authorities are elected by the Mirandina people in a universal, direct and secret way, sending 13 deputies to the National Assembly of Venezuela.

The state of Miranda is divided into 21 municipalities and 55 parishes.

=== Municipalities and municipal seats ===
Miranda State is sub-divided into 21 municipalities, given below with their administrative centres, areas and populations:

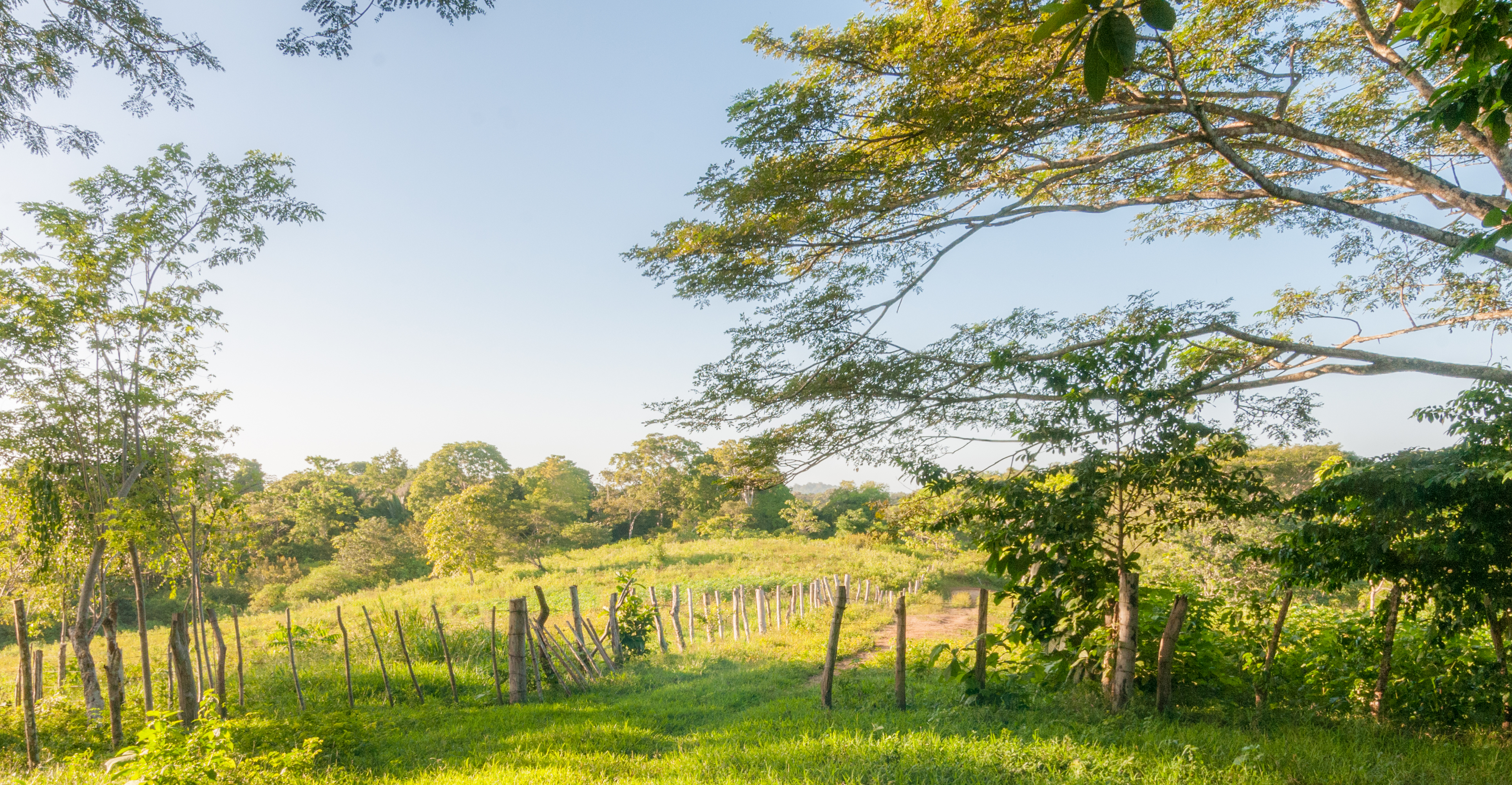
A farm in the Pedro Gual Municipality

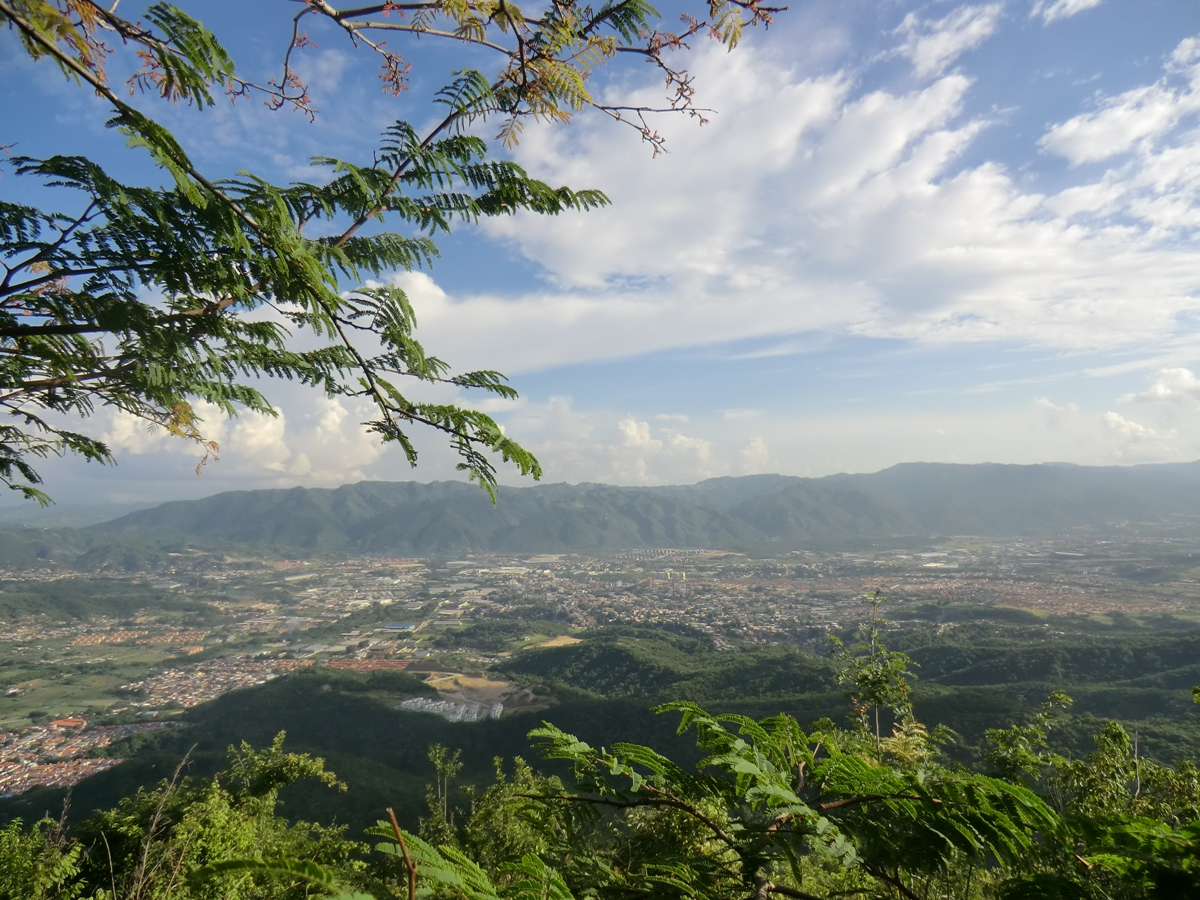
Guatire, Plaza Municipality

	Municipality	Administrative centre	Area (km^{2})	Population (Census 2001)	Population (Census 2011)	Population Estimate 30 June 2016
1.	Acevedo	Caucagua	1,879	70,282	87,371	96,210
2.	Andrés Bello	San José de Barlovento	114	20,119	20,981	22,851
3.	Baruta	Nuestra Señora del Rosario de Baruta	86	260,853	240,755	362,371
4.	Brión	Higuerote	531	45,346	58,940	67,332
5.	Buroz	Mamporal	198	20,009	27,515	29,841
6.	Carrizal	Carrizal	32	41,103	51,712	56,629
7.	Chacao	Chacao	13	64,629	61,213	76,888
8.	Cristóbal Rojas	Charallave	120	77,257	117,888	141,593
9.	El Hatillo	El Hatillo	81	54,225	58,156	90,554
10.	Guaicaipuro	Los Teques	661	222,768	252,242	289,531
11.	Independencia	Santa Teresa del Tuy	284	126,999	138,776	157,961
12.	Lander	Ocumare del Tuy	478	108,970	144,947	170,728
13.	Los Salias	San Antonio de los Altos	51	60,723	68,255	76,035
14.	Páez	Río Chico	963	30,812	37,944	42,125
15.	Paz Castillo	Santa Lucía	408	83,976	111,197	124,671
16.	Pedro Gual	Cúpira	925	17,928	21,831	23,879
17.	Plaza	Guarenas	180	188,135	209,987	238,750
18.	Simón Bolívar	San Francisco de Yare	131	31,944	42,597	48,445
19.	Sucre	Petare	164	546,766	600,351	691,317
20.	Urdaneta	Cúa	273	105,606	135,432	167,768
21.	Zamora	Guatire	378	152,422	187,075	218,911
	Total state	Los Teques	7,950		2,675,165	3,194,390

=== Other important towns ===
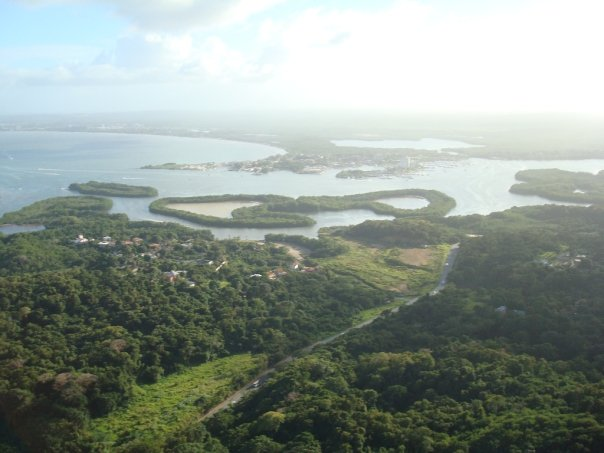
Higuerote, Miranda State

- Aragüita
- Araira
- Capaya
- Cartanal
- Cumbo
- Curiepe
- El Café
- El Clavo
- El Guapo
- La Democracia
- Laguna de Tacarigua
- Las Brisas
- Machurucuto

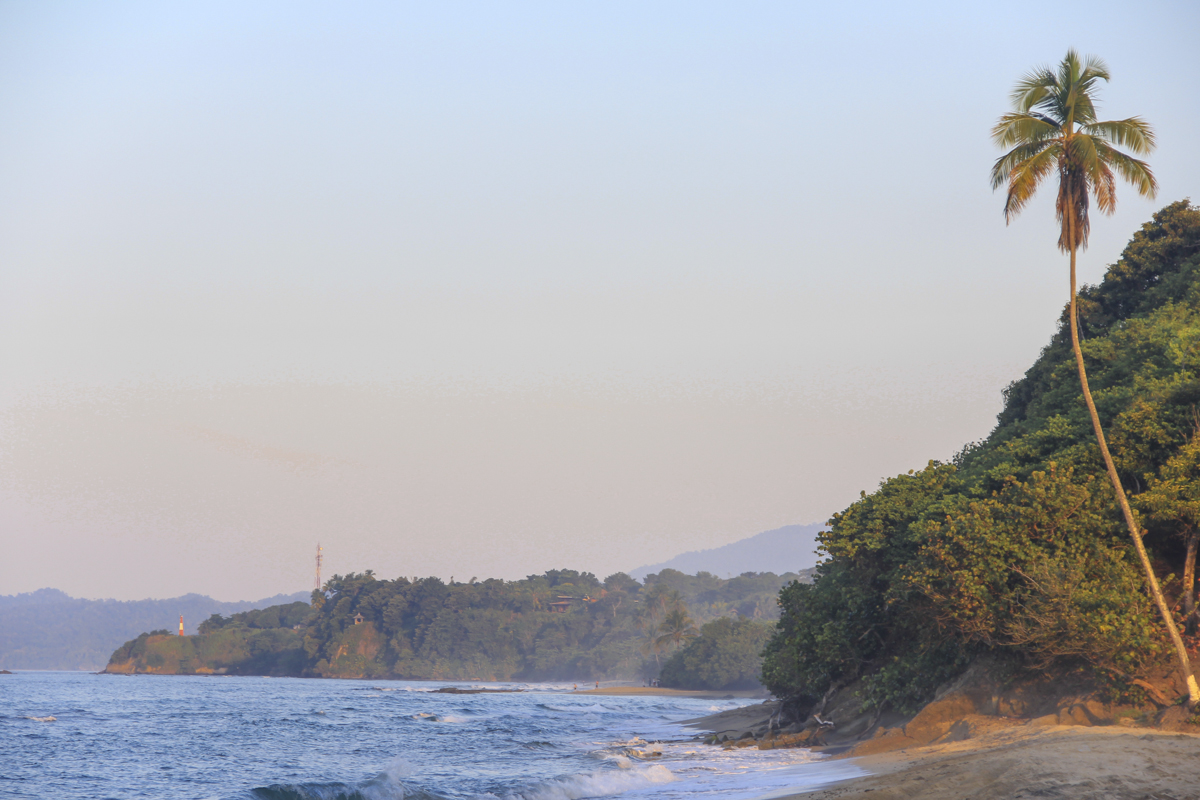
Paraiso Beach, Brión Municipality

- Marizapa
- Minas de Baruta
- Nueva Cúa
- Panaquire
- Paparo
- Paracotos
- San Antonio de Yare
- San José de Río Chico
- San Pedro de los Altos
- Tacarigua de Mamporal
- Tácata
- Tapipa

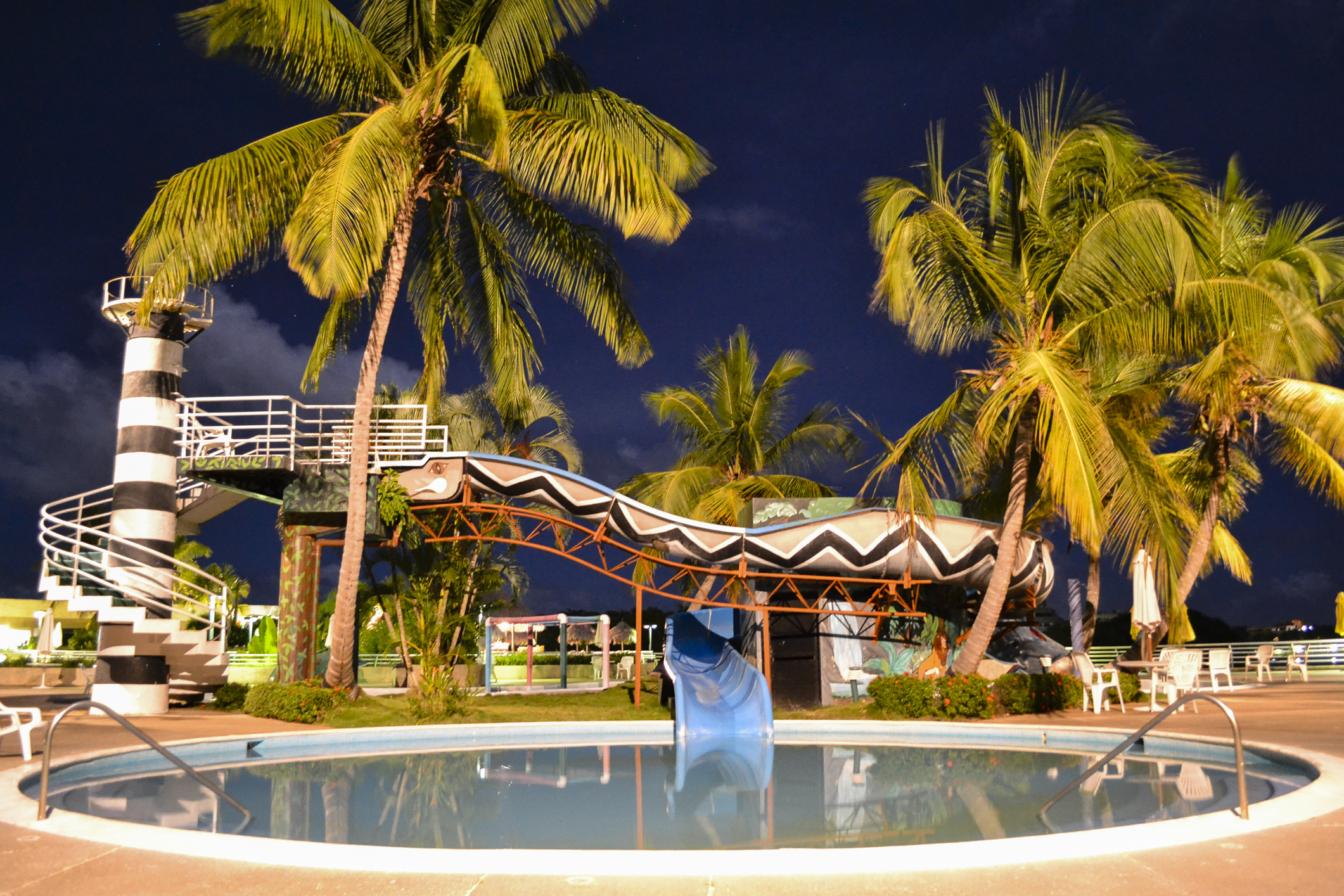
Rio Chico, Miranda State

== Demographics ==
Historical population
Year	Pop.	±% p.a.
1873	109,917	—
1881	127,844	+1.91%
1891	141,446	+1.02%
1920	174,266	+0.72%
1926	189,572	+1.41%
1936	216,527	+1.34%
1941	227,604	+1.00%
1950	276,273	+2.18%
1961	492,349	+5.39%
1971	856,272	+5.69%
1981	1,421,442	+5.20%
1990	1,871,442	+3.10%
2001	2,330,872	+2.02%
2011	2,675,165	+1.39%
Source: "XIV CENSO NACIONAL DE POBLACIÓN Y VIVIENDA - Resultados por Entidad Federal y Municipio del Estado Miranda" (PDF). Instituto Nacional de Estadística.

=== Race and ethnicity ===
In the 2011 Census, the racial composition of the population was:

Racial composition	Population	%
Mestizo	—N/a	48.0
White	1,387,265	45.8
Black	157,506	5.2
Other race	—N/a	1.0

== Economy ==
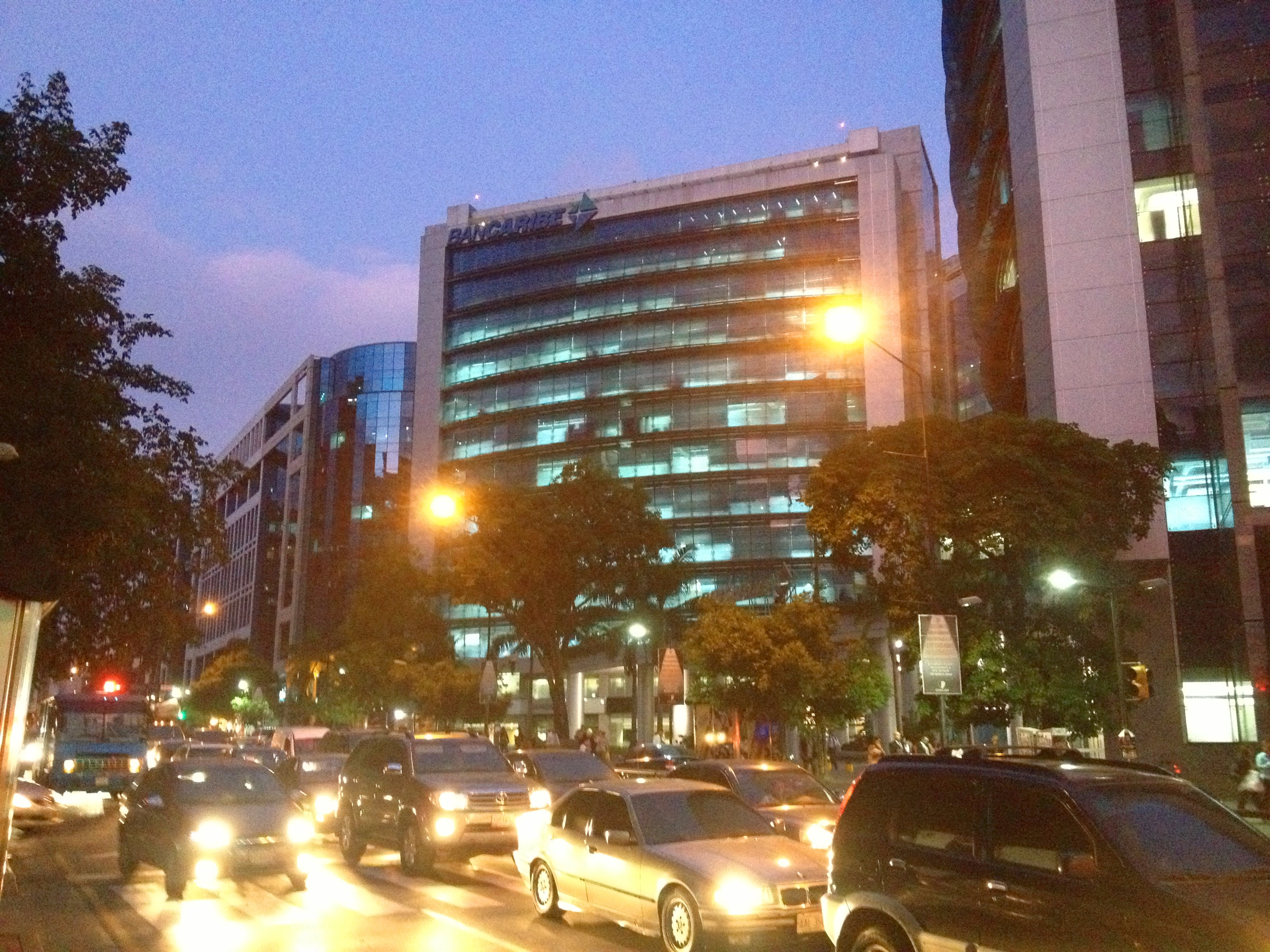
Centro Empresarial Galipan, Chacao Municipality, Miranda State

The economic development of the state is based on the excellence of its soils, which has allowed the boom in agriculture. The region of the valleys of Tuy is characterized by the production of cocoa, sugar cane, and corn, among other crops. Barlovento also has great fertility of its lands, standing out the cultivation of cocoa and a great variety of fruits and vegetables. Likewise, Guatire and Guarenas have good lands for cultivation, with coffee being one of the main products of the area.

Among other economic activities is the industrial one, standing out the manufacturing one, which conforms together with that of the Federal District the first urban manufacturing set of the country.

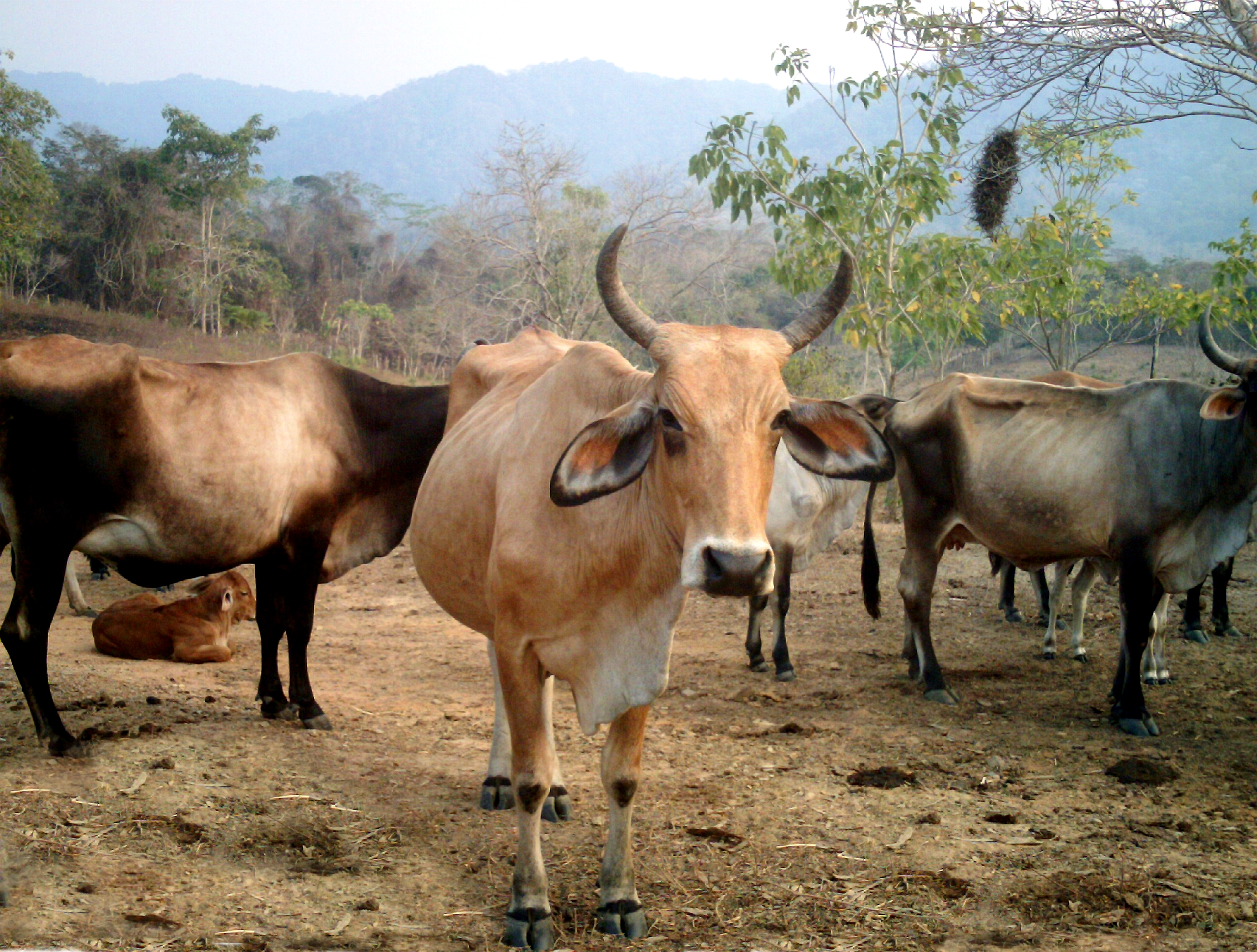
Cattle in Chaguamaral, Miranda State

The tertiary sector is extremely important: financial, commercial and service activities are concentrated in the area of Miranda. During the last two decades the tourist activity has grown with the installation of a great hotel infrastructure in the coast of Barlovento.

Cereals are grown in the fertile valleys of Tuy, while the microclimates are used for horticultural and fruit activities whose products are processed in the agro-industries.

In suburban areas, poultry and pig farming are practiced, especially promoted by Portuguese, Spanish and Italian immigrants.

Coffee production has decreased; however, the expansion of sugar cane and cotton crops in the Tuy Valley continues. Since colonial times there have been cocoa plantations in Barlovento combined with cassava, yams, beans and bananas.

The industrialization process had an important economic impact, favored by its proximity to the city of Caracas, mainly in the cities of Petare, Guarenas and Guatire and in the valley of Tuy, where manufacturing centers of the metal-mechanical, chemical and food sectors were established. This led to a major urban boom, which caused a decrease in the amount of agricultural land.

=== Main products ===
- Agriculture: Cocoa, fruits, vegetables, coconut, yucca, cereals, flowers.
- Breeding: Poultry, cattle and pigs.
- Fishing: Tuna, mackerel, lebranche, mullet and bass (marimos). Shrimp and crab (crustaceans). Squid, chipichipi, guacuco, oyster and octopus (mollusks).
- Industrial: Metalworking, chemical and food products, alcoholic and soft drinks, graphic arts, textiles, footwear.

== Tourism ==
The state is well known for its green areas (including several national parks, haciendas and protected areas), for its highly urbanized cities that coexist with rural towns, for the coasts of the Caribbean Sea, a safe stop during vacation seasons, the Devils of Yare and the Tacarigua Lagoon.

It has large shopping centers, in the east of the metropolitan area of Caracas, for the enjoyment of the population, in the high mirandinos is La Cascada Commercial City, of large dimensions that has food fairs, cinemas, large stores, and all kinds of services and bank agencies. Additionally, in the professional center La Cascada is the high mirandine headquarters of the SENIAT, also near Los Teques is the town of San Pedro de Los Altos, an agricultural town, where vegetables and large areas of flower crops are grown, and several bottling plants for mineral water such as Minalba and Zenda where pure spring water is bottled.

It also highlights its architecture ranging from modern Chacao to the colonial architecture of many villages, highlighting in that aspect the many museums, cathedrals and historic churches it has. It also has a diversity of monuments, urban parks, viewpoints, theaters, among many other spaces for the enjoyment of visitors.

=== Natural heritage ===
The state of Miranda has monuments and natural heritage because of its incredible beauty, some of these are

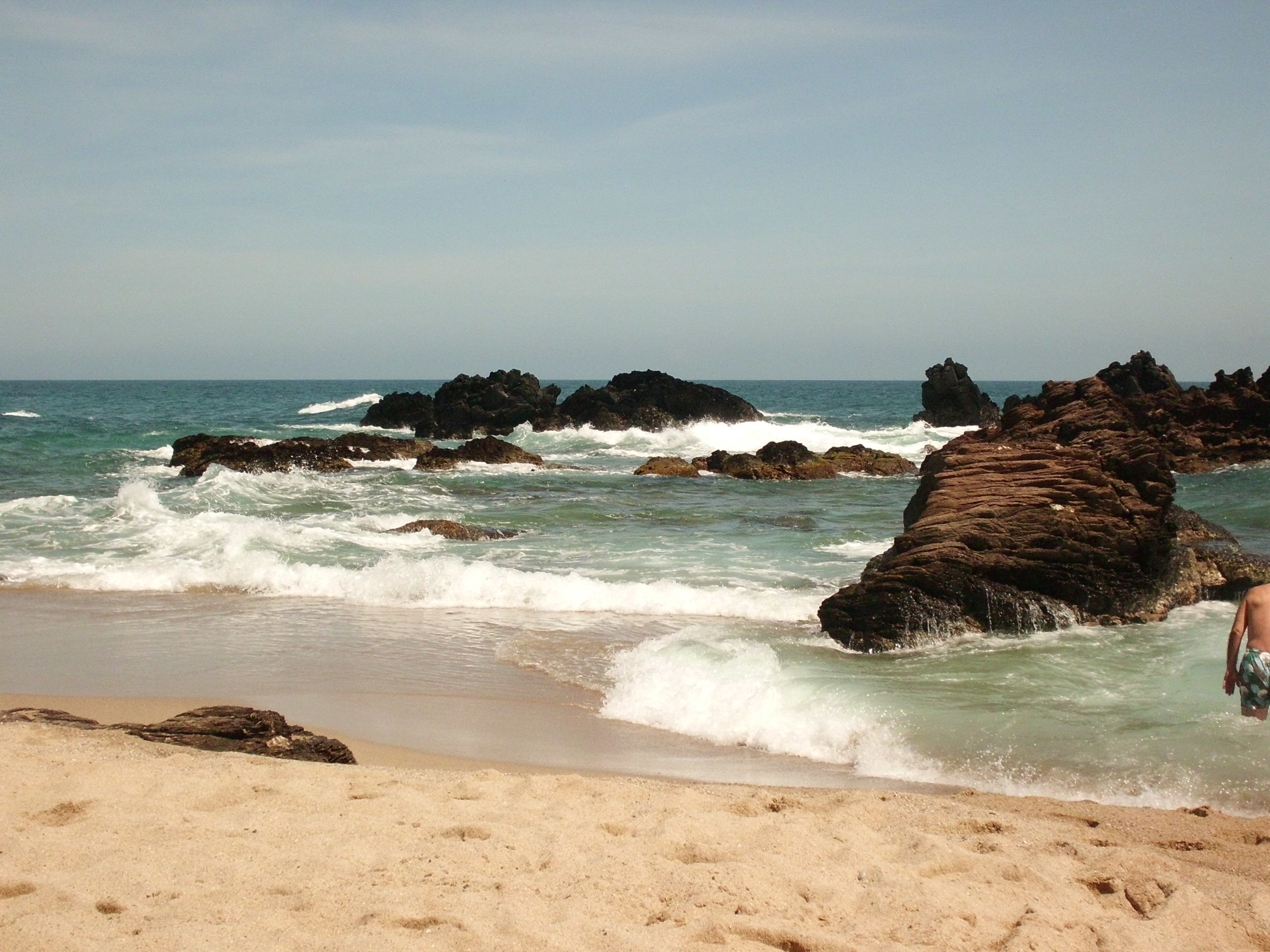
Caimán Beach, Miranda State

- Birongo
- The El Jarillo Village
- Higuerote
- Alfredo Jahn Cave Natural Monument
- Pico Codazzi Natural Monument
- Indian Cave Park
- El Ávila National Park
- Guatopo National Park
- Laguna de Tacarigua National Park
- Macarao National Park
- Carenero Beach
- Chirimena Beach
- Barlovento Beach
- Beaches of Buche and Los Totumos
- French Port

=== Built heritage ===
The state of Miranda has a varied architectural heritage:

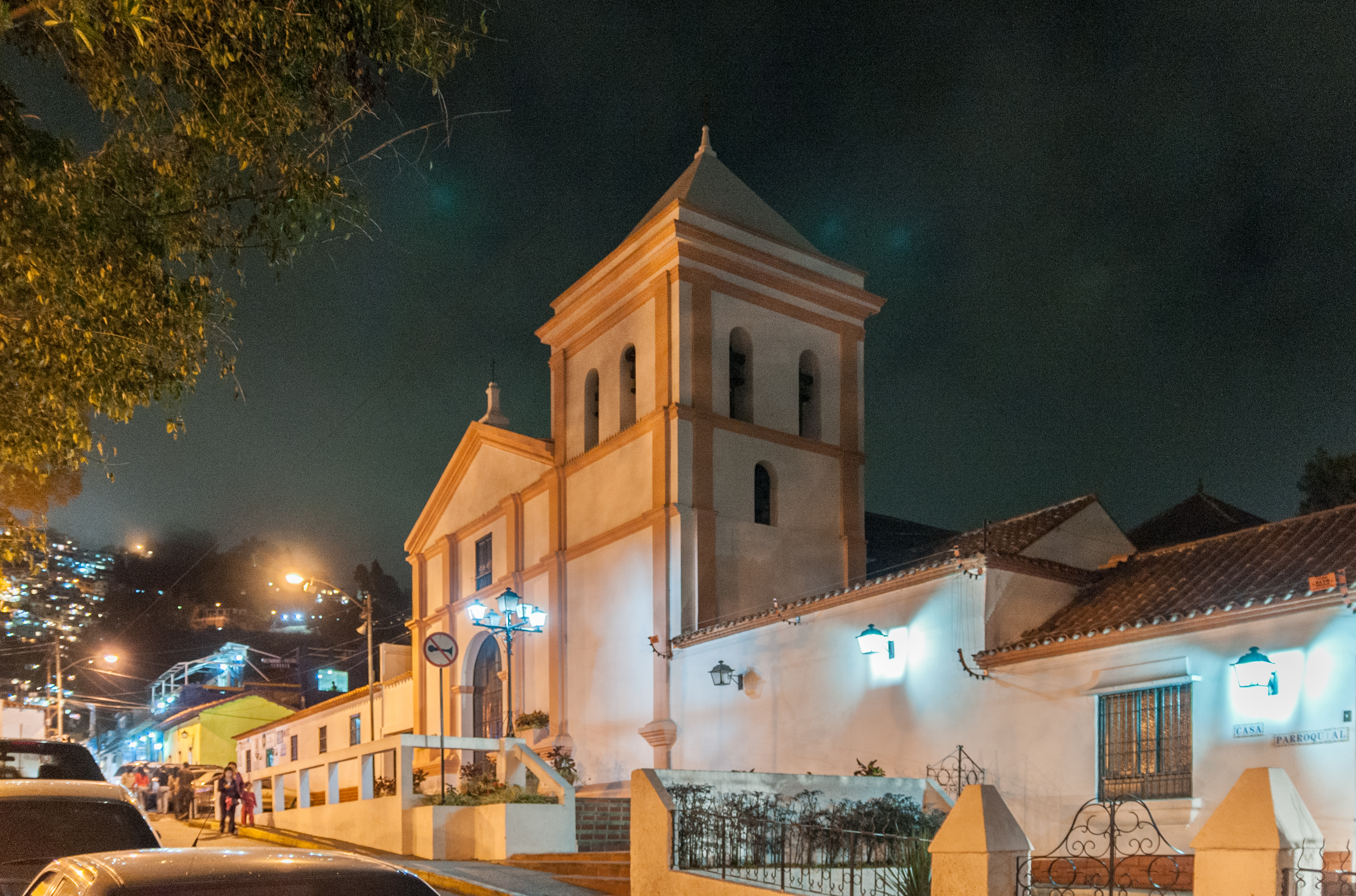
St. Rosalia of Palermo Church, El Hatillo

- Our Lady of Candelaria Chapel
- Arturo Michelena House
- Bolivar Museum House
- Cecilio Acosta Cultural Complex (includes the Los Teques Athenaeum, the Cecilio Acosta Central Library and the Emma Soler Amphitheatre)
- Tito Salas Contemporary Art Gallery Foundation
- San Benito Cultural Diversity Center in Santa Lucía
- Make the rosary
- Hacienda El Volcán
- Mediagua Estate
- Augustin Codazzi Aquarium

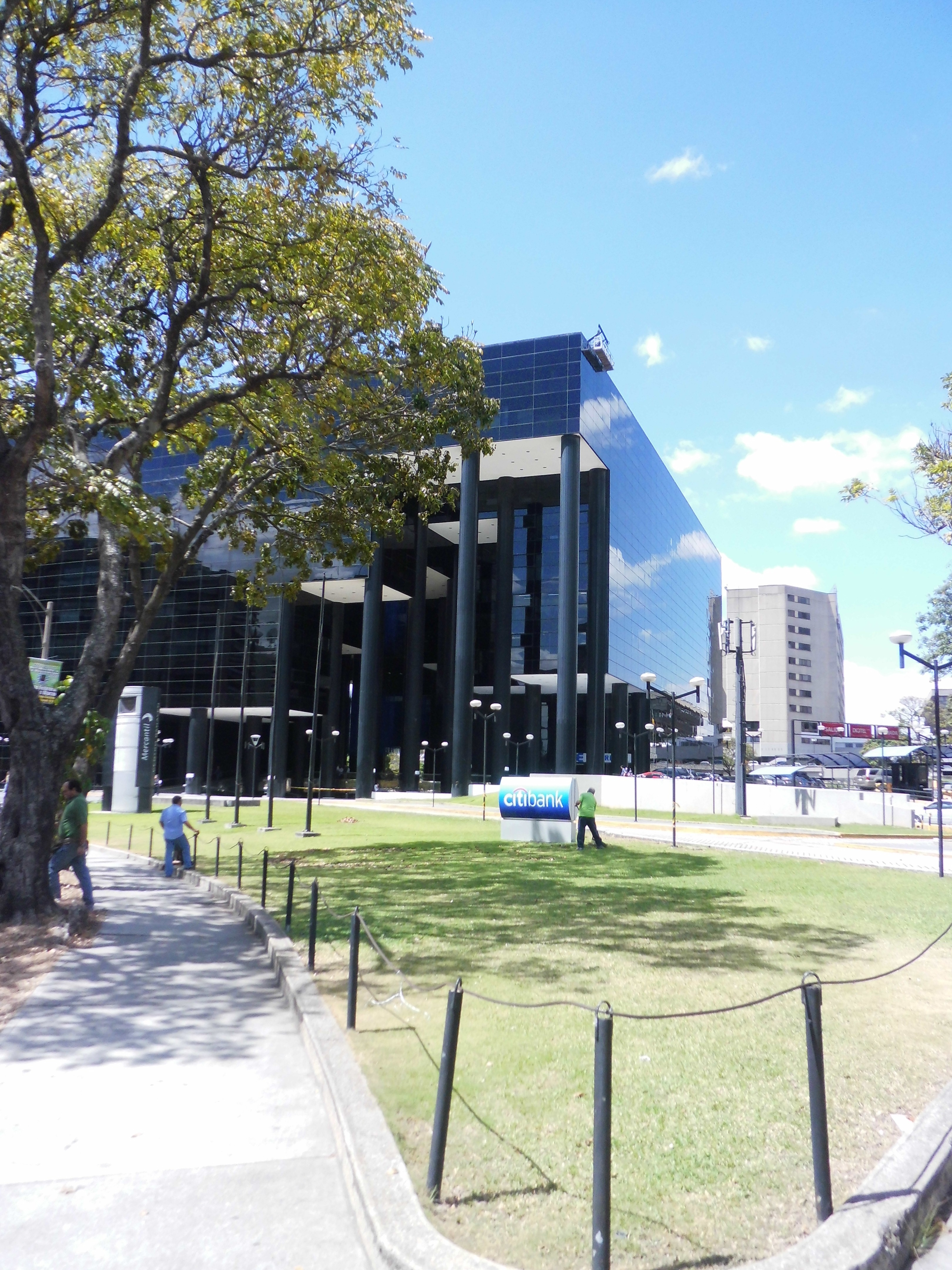
Cubo Negro, Miranda State

- San Felipe Neri Cathedral Church
- Church of Carmen
- Our Lady of Mount Carmel Church
- Santa Lucia del Tuy Parish Church
- St. Teresa of Jesus Parish Church
- Sweet Name of Jesus Parish Church

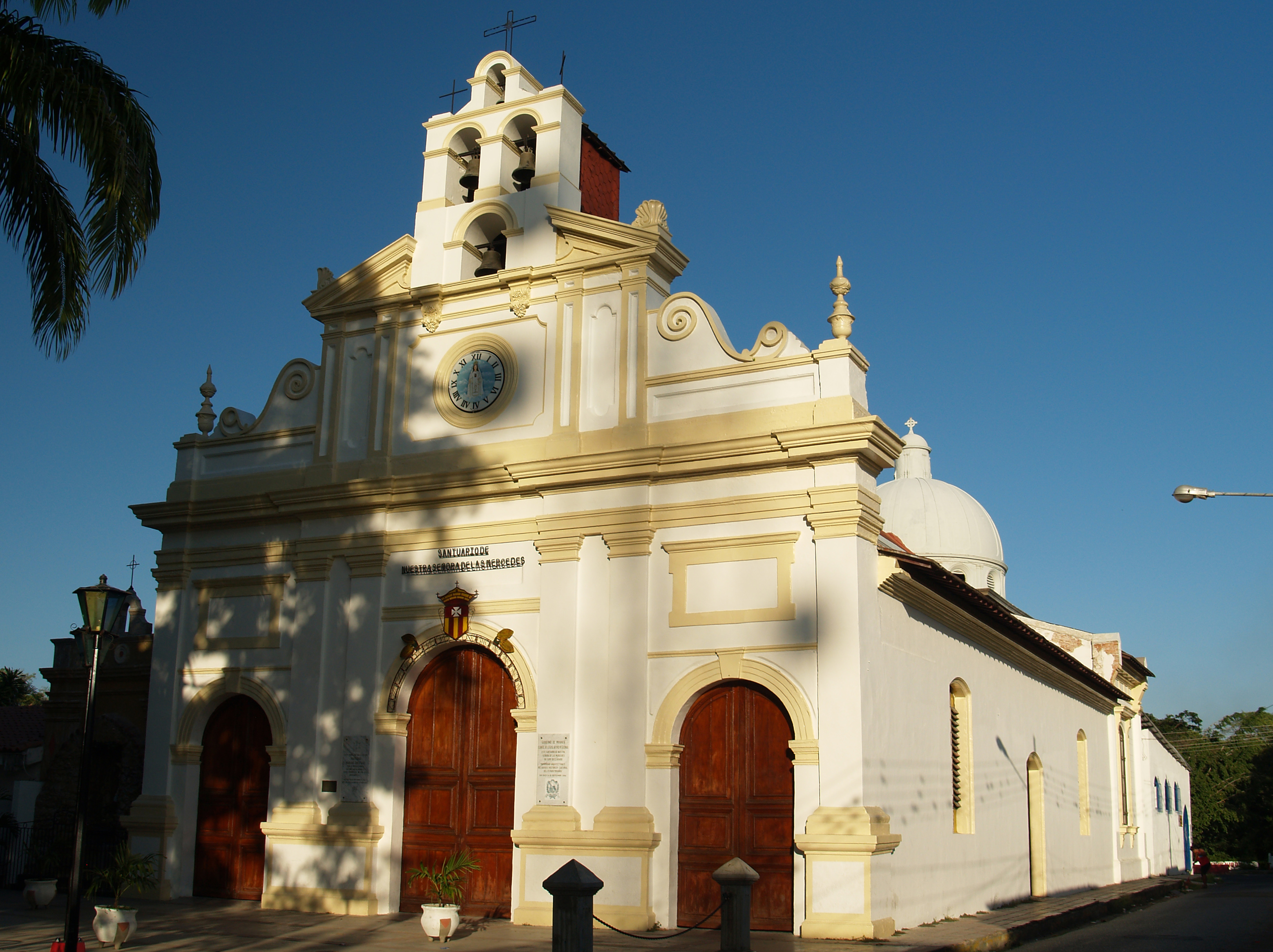
Our Lady of Mercy Shrine - Rio Chico

- Our Lady of Copacabana Parish Cathedral
- Our Lady of the Rosary Parish Church in Baruta
- Our Lady of the Rosary Parish Church of Cúa
- St. Rose of Lima Parish Church
- San Diego de Alcalá Church
- St. Joseph Church in Barlovento
- St. Joseph of Chacao Church
- Sanctuary of Betania
- Mirador the Butterfly
- Mirador San José de los Altos
- Lookout Down the Lighthouse El Cuji
- Drummonument
- Devil's Monument
- Monument Virgen del Carmen
- Monument of Saint Lucia, Virgin and Martyr
- Antonio María Piñate Museum
- Cristobal Rojas Museum
- Popular Art Museum of Petare
- White Linen Museum
- El Encanto Train
- Main Railway Station in Santa Teresa del Tuy
- Old Bridge of Santa Teresa del Tuy
- ICET Murano Art Factory

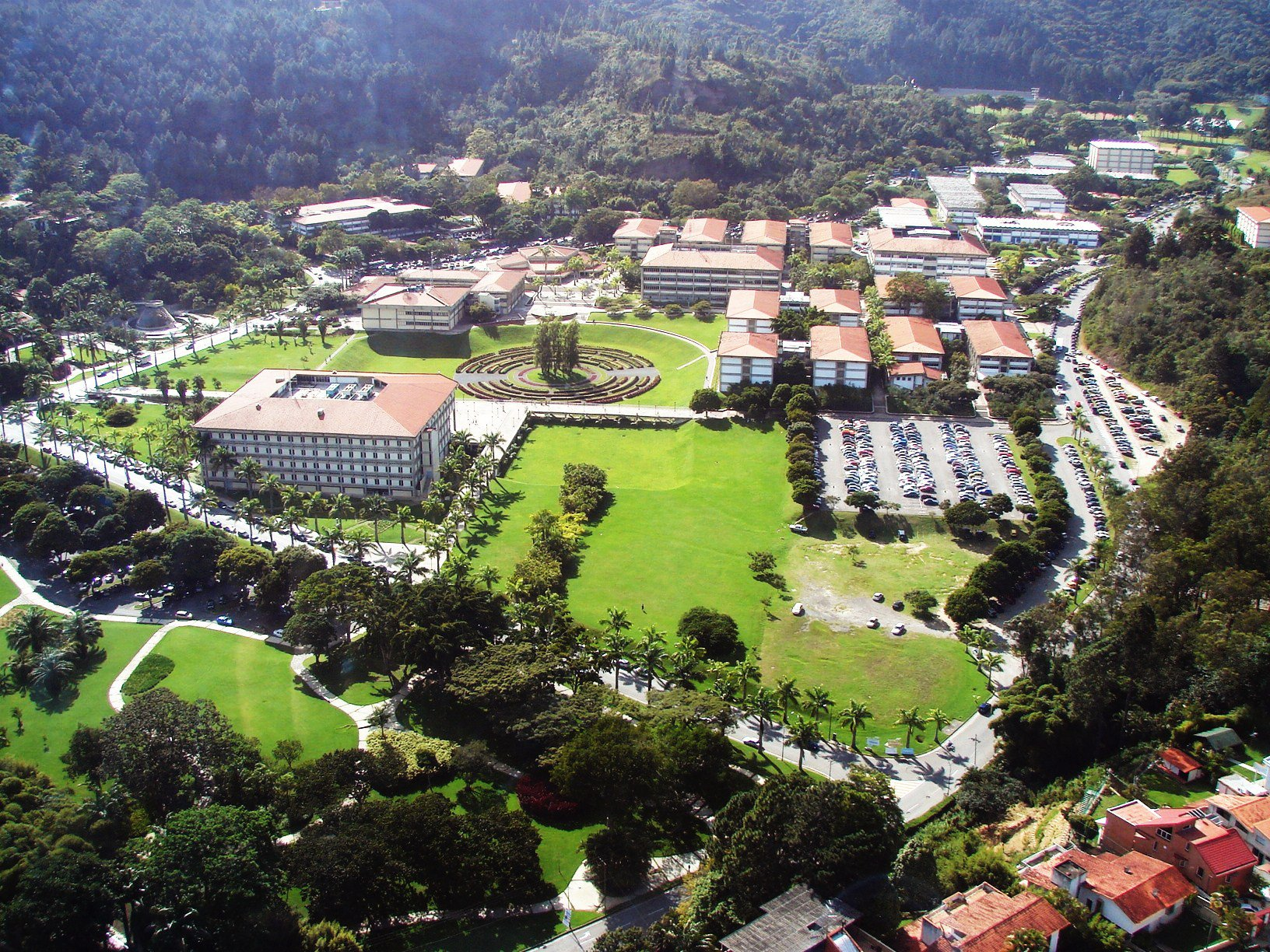
Simón Bolívar University, Baruta Municipality

== Transport ==
Central Ezequiel Zamora Railway System (Caracas - Cúa Line) has 4 stations (Caracas, Charallave Norte, Charallave Sur, Cúa) and has a length of 41.4 km². Subway system:

- Los Teques Subway, inaugurated in 2006. It has 5 stations: Las Adjuntas (belonging to Metro de Caracas), Ayacucho, Ali Primera, Guaicaipuro and independencia.
- Caracas Metro.
- Surface roads: the most important are the Francisco Fajardo Highway, Prados del Este Highway and Boyacá Avenue (Cota mil). It also has roads that connect several towns within the state, as well as outside of it.

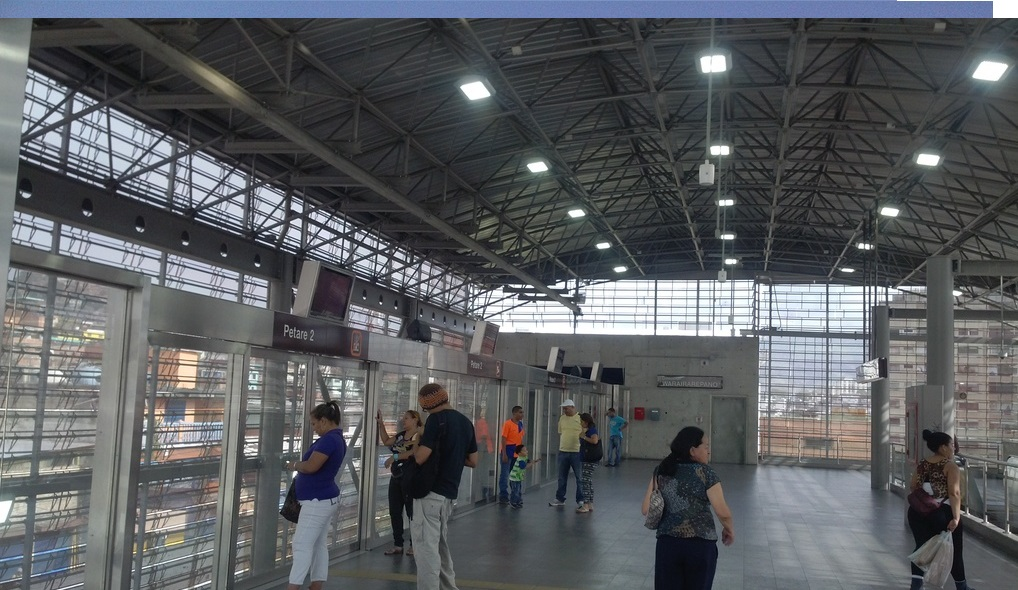
Petare II Station, Cabletren Bolivariano, Sucre Municipality

== Education ==
=== Universities ===
- Santa Maria University
- Simón Bolívar University
- Metropolitan University
- Nueva Esparta University
- Simón Rodíguez National Experimental University
- Andrés Bello Catholic University, Núcleo Los Teques
- National Experimental University of the Armed Forces
- Venezuelan Institute for Scientific Research (IVIC)
- PDVSA Intevep
- Villa del Cine

== Culture ==
=== Palmeros de Chacao ===
The tradition of the Palmeros de Chacao dates back to the Venezuelan colonial period in 1770, when the parish priest José Antonio Mohedano decided, in the form of a promise, to ask God for mercy due to an epidemic of yellow fever that existed in Caracas at the time. Coming from the haciendas near El Avila National Park, Mohedano sent a group of workers to bring down leaves from the Royal Palm to commemorate Jesus' entry into Jerusalem.

Nowadays, the Palmeros go up every Friday of the Council (the Friday before Palm Sunday) and come down the following Saturday with the palm leaves that will be blessed during the Sunday celebration. The palms are collected from a sector called Cueva de los Palmeros by the entrance of Sabas Nieves. Once blessed, the palms are distributed among the believers, who braid, crush and transform them into crosses that they keep in their homes as a sign of faith.

=== Diablos Danzantes de Yare ===
The Diablos Danzantes de Yare is a religious festival celebrated in San Francisco de Yare on Corpus Christi Day, carried out by the Sociedades del Santísimo Sacramento. The festival is a local version of the dancing devils of Corpus Christi.

Its origin dates back to the 18th century, being this the oldest brotherhood in the American continent and the largest in the world. The fraternity of devils is divided into a hierarchical order, represented in their masks.

Every Thursday of Corpus Christi (9 Thursdays after Holy Thursday) there is a ritual dance of the dancing devils, where they worship the Blessed Sacrament of the Altar and celebrate the triumph of good over evil.

=== Festival of San Juan de Curiepe ===
The Festival of San Juan de Curiepe is an Afro-descendant celebration held in the town of Curiepe. It commemorates the image of Saint John the Baptist, with a series of music and dance rituals that take place from midnight on June 23 to the evening of June 25th each year. San Juan is one of the festivities that gathers more devotees throughout the country, being the manifestation of Curiepe one of the best known in the nation.

=== Parranda of San Pedro ===
Parranda of San Pedro is a popular religious festivity that is celebrated every June 29 in the cities of Guatire and Guarenas. It has its origin in the Colonial Period. It consists of some parranderos, dressed in levita and pumpá (one of them carries the image of the saint, another carries a yellow and red flag) and accompanied by Cuatro and maracas. The percussion is achieved with some pieces of animal leather tied to the feet like sandals (called cotizas). They are also accompanied by two impoverished children, dressed in a red and yellow suit (similar to harlequins), who are known as tucusitos.

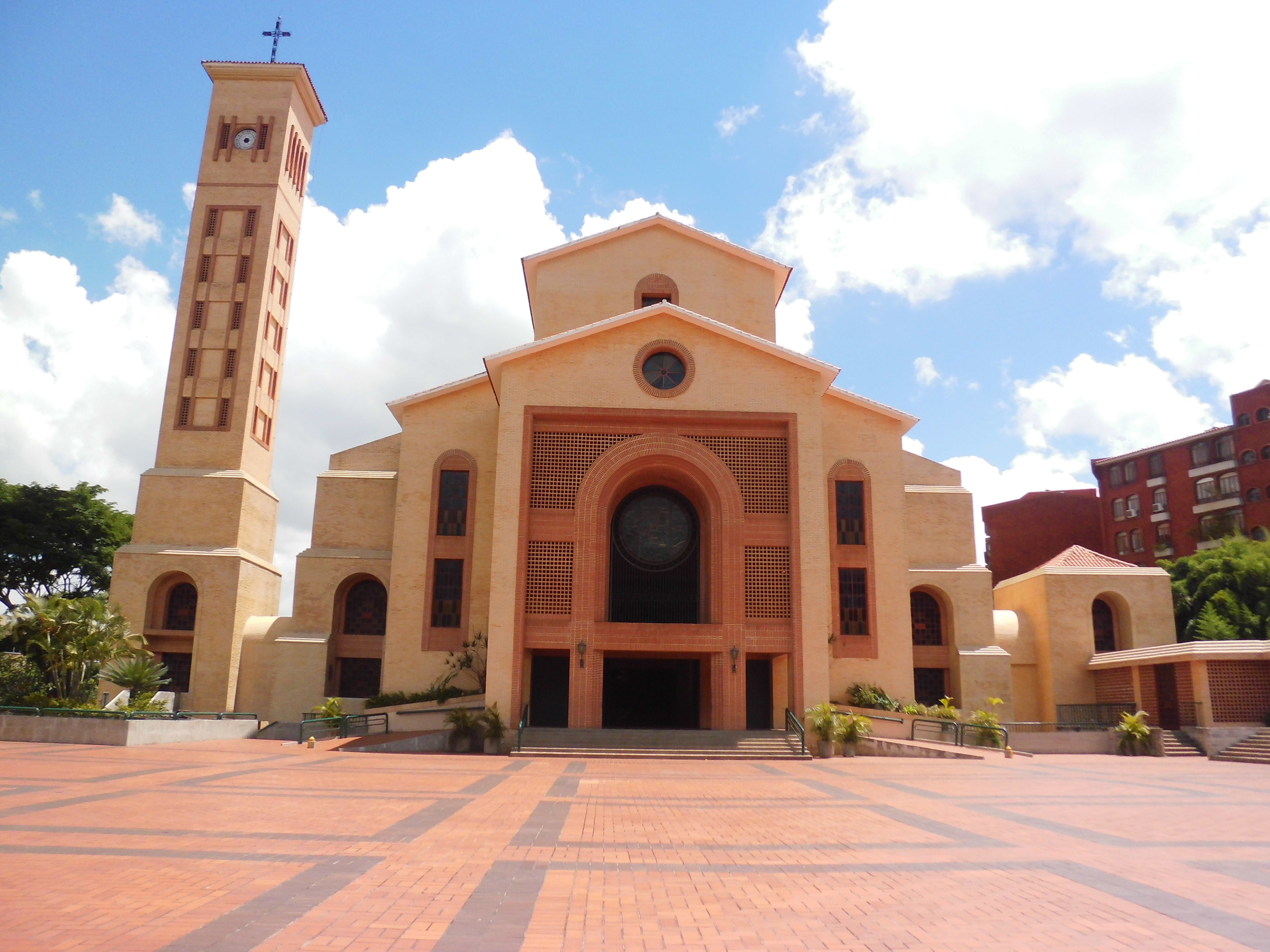
Sagrada Familia de Nazaret Church, Miranda State

=== Holy Cross of Pacairigua ===
The Holy Cross of Pacairigua is a religious image that is kept in the parish temple of the city of Guatire, that constitutes the religious patron of the city since the early seventeenth century. The cross, made of cedar wood, covered with white paint and gold edges, is two meters high. It is taken out in procession every year on May 3, the Day of the May Cross at the Catholic Santoral.

== Media ==
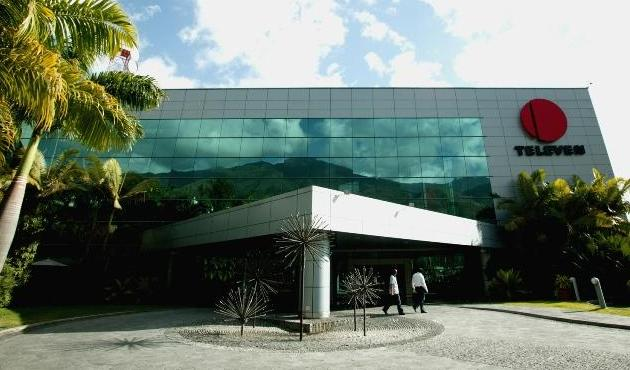
Headquarters of the Television Channel Televen in the Municipality of Sucre

=== Television ===
Several channels are based in Miranda, including: Mira Tv, Telemir, Venezolana de Televisión (the main television channel of Venezuela), Televen, La Tele, Canal i, and Telesur (a Venezuelan government propaganda channel). Channels from other states or countries are also transmitted, such as Globovisión and Venevisión.

=== Radio ===
There are several radio stations, including Latina 98.7 FM (Tropical), La Cima 96.7 FM (Tropical), Miranda 100.1 FM (Tropical), Ciudad 106.1 FM (Tropical), Antena 103.7 (Anglo Hispano), Melao 104.1 FM (Tropical), Panamericana 90.7 (Popular), Frecuencia Feeling 97.1 (Adulto Contemporáneo) among others, but the main ones with more power are those of Caracas that in their majority have their transmitting plants in the Avila hill, and can be listened in great part of the state of Miranda.

=== Written press ===
Among the newspapers published in the area are the daily Avance de Los Teques, La Voz de Guarenas and La Región, which covers the Alto Mirandinos, the metropolitan area, Guarenas and Guatire, also in the Valles del Tuy circulates the daily Noticias del Tuy. Other regional newspapers include Avance and Ciudad Petare (in that Caracas parish). In this state is also the headquarters of El Nacional, one of the most important newspapers in the country.

== Sports ==
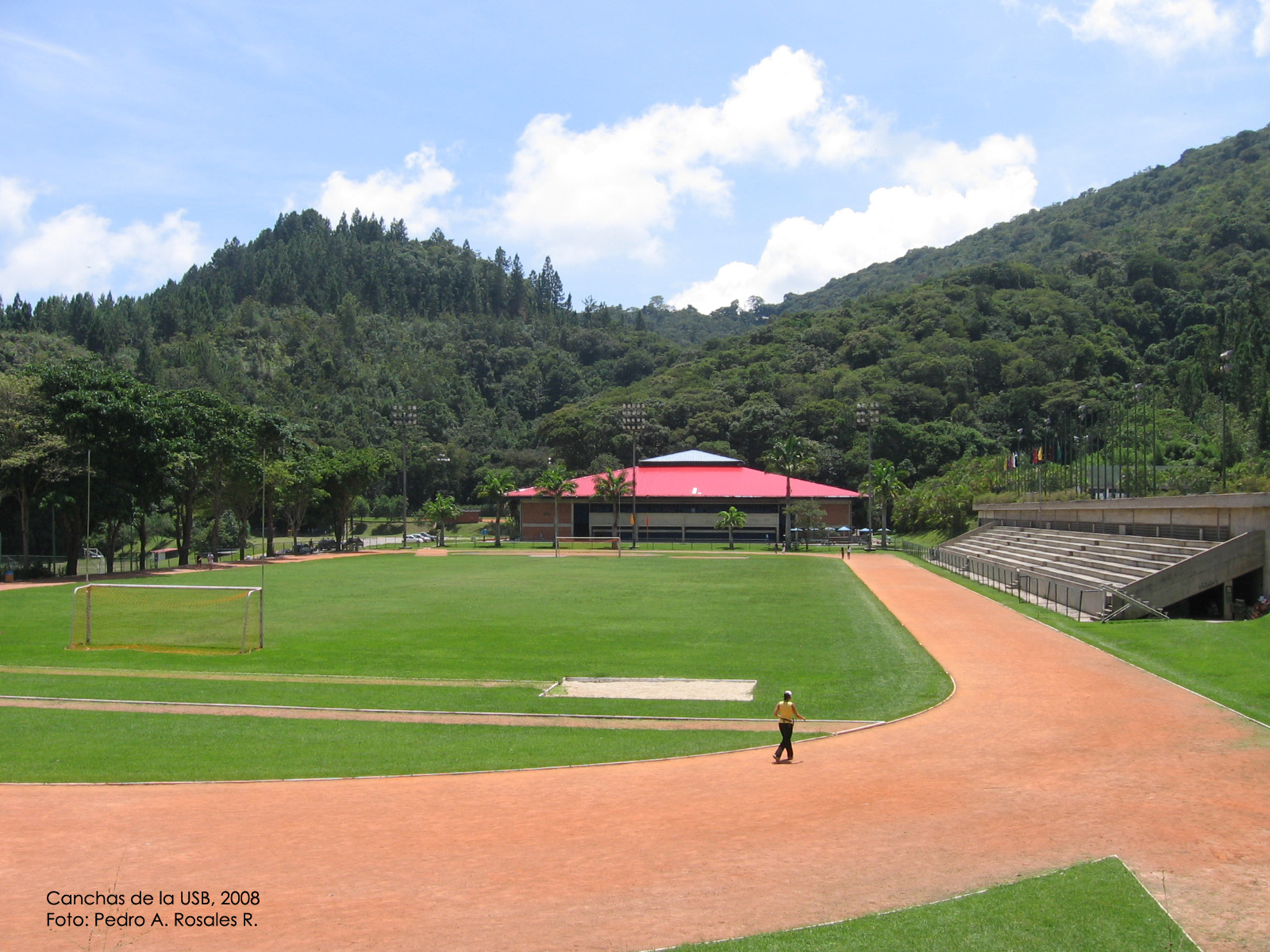
Universidad Simón Bolívar's multipurpose stadium

=== Sports Clubs ===
- Football: Petare Fútbol Club (Venezuelan First Division).
- Football: Atlético Sucre Club de Fútbol (Third Division of Venezuela).
- Indoor Football: Los Teques Futsal Club (Venezuelan Indoor Soccer League).
- Volleyball: Vikings of Miranda (Venezuelan Volleyball League).
- Basketball: Panteras de Miranda (Venezuelan Professional Basketball League).
- Basketball: Industriales de Guarenas (National Basketball League).
- Basketball: Bushido de Los Teques (National Basketball League).
- Basketball: Barlovento (National Basketball League).
- Basketball: Unión Ferrocarril del Tuy (National Basketball League).
- Baseball: Cacaoteros de Miranda (Bolivarian National Baseball League).
- Rugby: Universidad Metropolitana Rugby Club (Venezuelan Rugby Club Championship).
- Rugby: Simón Bolívar University Rugby Club (Venezuelan Rugby Club Championship).

=== Sports Facilities ===
- Arnaldo Arocha Sports Center Located in Los Teques. Capacity of 3,000 spectators.
- José Joaquín Papá Carrillo Gymnasium Located in Los Dos Caminos. Capacity of 3,500 spectators.
- Fray Luis de Leon Sports Complex.
- Simón Bolívar University Football Stadium.

== Notable people ==
- Ehire Adrianza, MLB player for the Minnesota Twins
- Luis Enrique Oberto, politician
- Miguel Pérez, baseball player
- Manuel Salazar, actor

== See also ==
- Francisco de Miranda
- States of Venezuela
