= Curiepe =

Town in Miranda State, Venezuela

- Town
- Location within Venezuela
- Coordinates: 10.4747°N 66.1697°W
- Country: Venezuela
- State: Miranda

Curiepe is a town in the state of Miranda, Venezuela.
