= Tácata =

- Location within Venezuela
- Coordinates: 10°12′N 67°00′W

Tácata is a town in Miranda State, Venezuela.
