= Cumbo =

Town in Miranda, Venezuela

- Town
- Location within Venezuela
- Coordinates: 10.2282°N 66.0867°W
- Country: Venezuela
- State: Miranda

Cumbo is a town in the state of Miranda, Venezuela.
