= Guaire River =

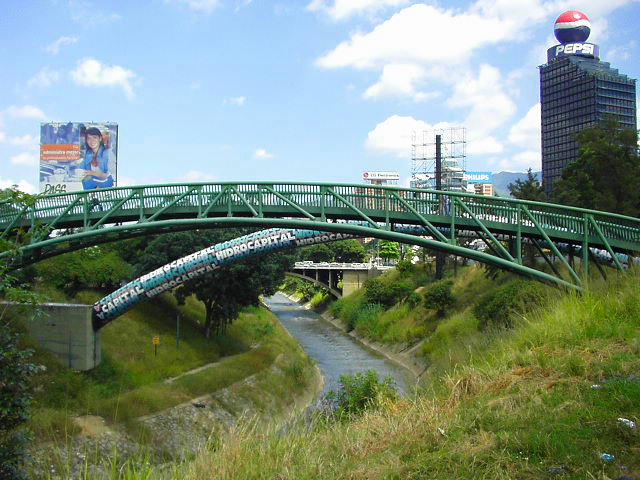

Location
- Country: Venezuela

Physical characteristics
- Source: Confluence of the San Pedro and Macarao Rivers in the Capital District
  - location: Venezuela
  - coordinates: 10°25′31″N 67°0′44″W
  - elevation: 976 m (3,202 ft)
- Mouth: Tuy River, east of the town of Santa Teresa del Tuy, Miranda State
  - location: Miranda State, Venezuela
  - coordinates: 10.4253°N 67.0125°W
  - elevation: 160 m (520 ft)
- Length: 72 km (45 mi)
- Basin size: 655 km^{2} (253 sq mi)

The Guaire River is a short river in Venezuela that flows through the nation's capital of Caracas. It is a tributary of the Tuy River and is 72 kilometers (45 miles) long in length. It rises in an area called Las Adjuntas in the Capital District of Venezuela at the confluence of the San Pedro and Macarao Rivers.

== History ==
On 19 April 2017, during the 2017 Venezuelan protests, the Mother of all Protests occurred. Demonstrators began gathering around the country at about 10:30am, with Caracas having 26 different routes for the main march to head to the office of the Ombudsman to demonstrate. As the march progressed through Caracas, the National Guard began to block routes and fire tear gas at marchers at 11:50am, whilst the demonstrators refused to leave despite the use of force. At about 12:30pm, demonstrations by both opposition and pro-government Venezuelans filled Caracas' avenues. Shortly after 12:45pm, protesters on the Francisco Fajardo Freeway near Bello Monte began to flee the area, with many leaping into the Guaire River, which is used for sewage drainage, to avoid the tear gas.
