= Minas de Baruta =

- country: Venezuela
- state: Miranda State

Minas de Baruta is a town in the state of Miranda, Venezuela. It is a parish of the Baruta Municipality in the urban area of Caracas.
