= San Francisco de Yare =

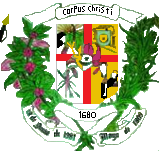
- Coat of arms

- Location within Venezuela
- Coordinates: 10°11′N 66°45′W
- Country: Venezuela
- State: Miranda

Population
  - Total: 38,400

The city of San Francisco de Paula de Yare is the capital of the Simón Bolívar Municipality, in the state of Miranda in Venezuela. It is located in the Middle Tuy Valley, approximately 70 kilometers (43 mi) south of Caracas.

== See also ==
- Dancing Devils of Yare
