= Santa Lucía, Miranda =

- Coordinates: 10°15′38″N 66°39′50″W

Santa Lucía is a city in the state of Miranda, Venezuela; it is the capital of Paz Castillo Municipality.
