= Caucagua River =

Location
- Country: Venezuela

Caucagua River is a river of Venezuela, a tributary of the Tuy River. It is part of the Orinoco River basin.

Tributaries include the Pacairigua River, Guarenas River, Araira River.

== See also ==
- List of rivers of Venezuela
