= Paz Castillo Municipality =

Paz Castillo Municipality Municipio Paz Castillo
- Municipality
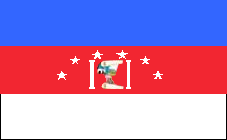
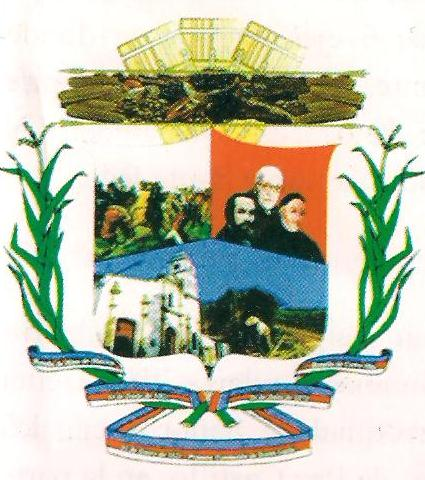
- Flag Coat of arms

- Location in Miranda

- Location in Venezuela
- Coordinates: 10°19′59″N 66°38′35″W
- Country: Venezuela
- State: Miranda
- Municipal seat: El Rosario de Soapire

Government
  - Mayor: Omar León (PSUV)

Area
  - Total: 402.3 km^{2} (155.3 sq mi)

Population (2007)
  - Total: 111,335
  - Density: 276.7/km^{2} (716.8/sq mi)
- Time zone: UTC−4 (VET)
- Area code(s): 0239
- Website: Official website

Paz Castillo is one of the 21 municipalities (municipios) that makes up the Venezuelan state of Miranda, named after poet and diplomat Fernando Paz Castillo and, according to a 2007 population estimate by the National Institute of Statistics of Venezuela, the municipality has a population of 111,335. The town of Santa Lucía is the municipal seat of the Paz Castillo Municipality.

== Demographics ==
The Paz Castillo Municipality, according to a 2007 population estimate by the National Institute of Statistics of Venezuela, has a population of 111,335 (up from 90,778 in 2000). This amounts to 3.9% of the state's population. The municipality's population density is 272.88 inhabitants per square kilometre (706.8/sq mi).

== Government ==
The mayor of the Paz Castillo Municipality is Elio Serrano, re-elected on October 31, 2004, with 57% of the vote. The municipality is divided into one parishes; (Santa Lucía).
