= Tuy River =

Location
- Country: Venezuela

Physical characteristics
- Mouth
  - location: Caribbean Sea
- Length: 239 km (149 mi)

The Tuy River is a river of northern Venezuela, in the Valles del Tuy (Tuy Valleys) of Miranda State. The principal river of Miranda, it flows north from Aragua State through Miranda into the Caribbean Sea. Tributaries include the Guaire River, the principal river of Caracas, and the Caucagua River.

Towns on the Tuy River include Cúa and Ocumare del Tuy.

== See also ==
- List of rivers of Venezuela
