= Nueva Cúa =

- country: Venezuela
- state: Miranda State

Nueva Cúa is a town in the state of Miranda, Venezuela.
