= San Antonio de Yare =

- country: Venezuela
- state: Miranda State

San Antonio de Yare is a town in the state of Miranda, Venezuela.

== Demography ==
Apart from its capital San Antonio de Yare, the civil parish has several localities:

El Tigre

The Pica

San Antonio de Yare
