= 1900 San Narciso earthquake =

Earthquake in Venezuela

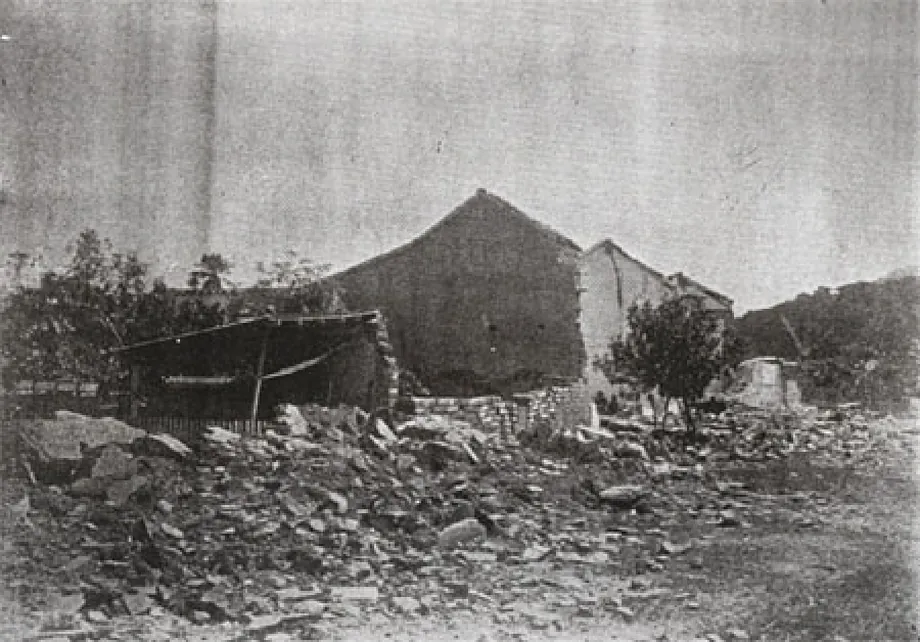

- Location within Venezuela
- UTC time: 1900-10-29 09:11:00
- ISC event: 16957719
- USGS-ANSS: ComCat
- Local date: October 29, 1900
- Local time: 04:30–04:45 VET
- Magnitude: 7.6–7.7 M_{w} 7.7–8.4 M_{s}
- Depth: 15 km (9.3 mi)
- Epicenter: 11.0°N 66.0°W
- Fault: San Sebastián Fault
- Type: Strike-slip
- Max. intensity: MMI VIII (Severe)
- Tsunami: 5 m (16 ft)
- Casualties: 25–140 dead

An earthquake occurred in Venezuela on 29 October 1900 (feast of Saint Narcissus of Girona) between 4:30 and 4:45 am local time. Its epicenter was off Miranda State or near the Venezuelan capital Caracas, in the Cariaco Basin. It had an estimated moment magnitude of 7.6–7.7 and a surface-wave magnitude of 7.7–8.4. It had a maximum Mercalli intensity of VIII (Severe). It caused widespread landslides and soil liquefaction, and many buildings were severely damaged or collapsed. It is the largest instrumentally recorded earthquake in the country.

== Earthquake ==
The earthquake measured 7.7 on the surface-wave and moment magnitude scales, making it the largest instrumentally recorded earthquake in Venezuela. The National Geophysical Data Center listed this earthquake as having a surface wave magnitude of 8.4 while a 1983 catalog placed that figure at 7.7. Charles Francis Richter also assigned the earthquake at M_{s} 8.4 in his 1958 book Elementary seismology. In a 1992 catalog and 2020 study, this event was assigned M_{w} 7.6. More than 250 aftershocks were recorded in the months following the main event. The aftershocks were disruptive to the local population. One of these aftershocks is rumored to have woken then president of Venezuela, Cipriano Castro. He leapt from the Yellow House and was injured.

The earthquake was associated with strike-slip faulting along either the La Tortuga or San Sebastián faults. These faults are east–west striking structures located off the northern Venezuelan coast. A marine seismic study in 2015 concluded that the San Sebastián Fault was the structure responsible for this earthquake. The San Sebastián Fault is submarine for most of its length and runs parallel to the southern flanks of the Venezuelan Coastal Range. Ocean-bottom surveys found recent seafloor deformation and fault scarps interpreted to be due to fault movement during the earthquake. Various rupture lengths have been suggested; 220 km (140 mi) for a M_{w} 7.6 event, and 270 km (170 mi) for a M_{w} 7.7 event, while a depth of 15 km (9.3 mi) was inferred. The 1900 earthquake is thought to have ruptured a section of the San Sebastián Fault located between the 1812 and 1853 ruptures.

== Impact ==
With an epicenter in the Caribbean Sea, the earthquake badly affected the north-central Venezuelan coast. In the central region, the earthquake resulted in shaking as high as IX on the Modified Mercalli intensity scale, covering a 3,560 km^{2} region around the epicenter. The seaside cities of Macuto, Guarenas and Guatire were the most severely affected by the earthquake. The Los Roques archipelago in the Caribbean Sea suffered heavy impact, reportedly having the highest number of victims. Estimates for the number of deaths vary; from a single report of 25 deaths in Guarenas, to 140 people killed.

Large landslides and liquefactions took place in Anzoátegui, Aragua, Carabobo, Distrito Capital, Miranda and Vargas. The heavily populated localities that were affected include Barcelona, Onoto and Carenero. Some slight damage was reported in San Antonio de Los Altos, Paparo, Panaquire, Guarenas, Capaya, La Tortuga Island, Los Roques archipelago, Güigüe, San Diego, Clarines, Puerto Cabello and Caucagua.

Iglesia de San Francisco, a church in Caracas, was severely damaged. Another church in Naiguatá was completely destroyed. In Macuto, landslides buried or destroyed railway lines serving the cities Caracas and La Guaira. Guatire saw 237 homes, a parish church, government house, and court offices damaged or collapsed. In Guarenas, some 72 homes toppled.

At the El Rincón port in Barcelona, built on alluvium deposits from the Neverí River, many large cracks opened in the ground, and some were longer than 300 m (980 ft). A 400 m^{2} (4,300 sq ft) area of alluvium in the city experienced substantial ground subsidence. Field observations also reported that an opening of the river narrowed by more than 2 m (6 ft 7 in), while its water level rose. The water level in several saline wells rose by several meters and began sloshing violently.

Along the Unare River in Anzoátegui, portions of its bank slumped into the water. Large and deep fissures opened, ejecting mud and water. Seiches formed along the river, causing water to breach the channel by 7 m (23 ft). One person was caught in the waves but managed to escape. In Carenero, Miranda, the ground sprouted black water that smelled of sulfur. Liquefaction caused several homes and other buildings to sink partially. Hot springs located near San Diego, Anzoátegui, were subsequently dried up after the earthquake. Residents living around Lake Valencia reported violent seiches. They added that large flames and fire shot from the ground near the lake shores. A landslide about 100 m (330 ft) across blocked a section of the Caracas-La Guaira highway between Guaracarumbo and Ojo de Agua.

== Tsunami ==
A tsunami flooded the low-lying near shore zones of northern Venezuela. Waves swept into the Los Roques archipelago and north-central Venezuelan coasts. It manifested in the form of tidal bores at the mouth of the Neverí River which resulted in the rise in water level. The tsunami is estimated to be 1–meter high. Witnesses at the coast at the mouth of the Guapo River in Puerto Tuy, Miranda reported seeing large waves up to 10 meters high, although this claim is disputed. Because the earthquake struck in complete darkness, before sunrise, it is unlikely the eyewitnesses could have a clear view of the wave. In addition, it is nearly impossible for them to survive being struck by the 10-meter tsunami. The small village of Paparo was partially submerged by the waves. A better estimate of the maximum tsunami wave height is 5 meters at Barlovento. The tsunami may have been generated by a submarine landslide or significant vertical slip mechanism associated with faulting.

== Legacy ==
The earthquake of 1900 was a catalyst in expanding research in seismology in Venezuela. The first seismic instruments were brought into the country and installed at the Cagigal Observatory from November 1900 to early 1901.

== See also ==
- List of earthquakes in 1900
- List of earthquakes in Venezuela
