= Barlovento, Venezuela =

Sub-region of Miranda, Venezuela

Coordinates: 10.43329°N 66.76656°W

Barlovento
- Region
- Barlovento
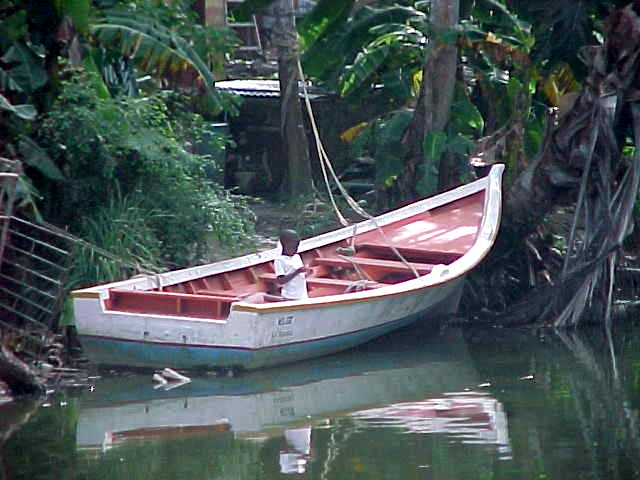
- A child in a boat in Chiremena, a coastal village
- Interactive map of Barlovento
- Country: Venezuela
- State: Miranda

Area
  - Total: 432 km^{2} (167 sq mi)

Population
  - Total: 433,062
- Demonyms: Barloventeño: North: Higuerote (between Aragüita and Machurucuto); South: Guárico; East: Anzoátegui; West: Valley of Caracas and the Tuy Valleys

Barlovento is a sub-region of Miranda state, Venezuela. During Spanish colonization of the Americas, Barlovento was developed as estate owners founded cacao haciendas. The work on the estates was done by African slaves brought from what is now the Republic of the Congo, Democratic Republic of the Congo and Angola. These people were from the Kingdom of Kongo and Kingdom of Loango. There were also Yoruba slaves.

The culture of African and Spanish inhabitants has merged into the "drum dancing", Barlovento's typical Afro-Venezuelan celebration. This occurs particularly at the time of the feast of San Juan. Other events include the Entierro de la Sardina (Burial of the Sardine) and Day of the Dead. A syncretism has occurred where Catholic saints represent traditional African deities.

== Toponymy ==
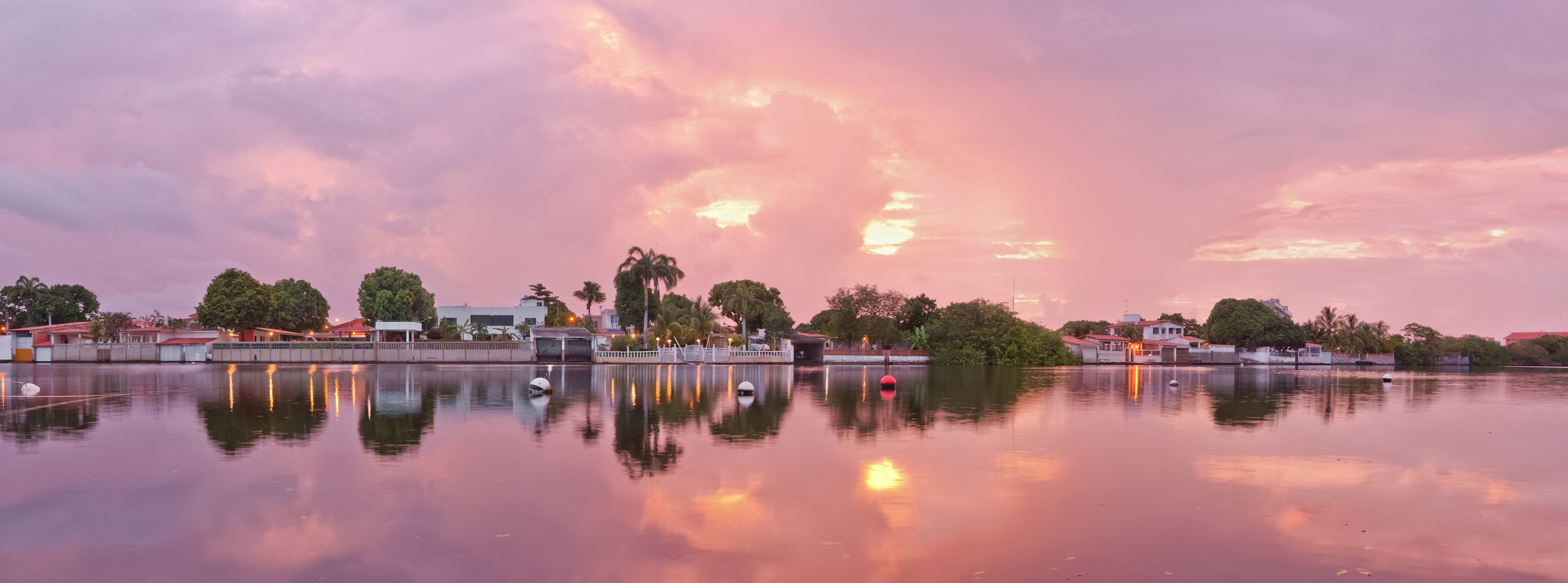
Dawn in Puerto Encantado, Higuerote

"Barlovento" is a Spanish word meaning "windward". This is due to the wind coming from Barlovento to the south of the region, where it brings heavy rain, then returning to the coast to cross the Caribbean and the Atlantic Ocean, bringing rain to the Canary Islands.

== Location ==
Barlovento lies near the coast of Venezuela which forms the northern aspect of South America. It is located between the parallels 10 ° and 11 °, north latitude and the meridians 65 ° and 67 °, longitude west. Caracas is about 100 kilometres (62 mi) to the east.

To the north is the Caribbean Sea. To the east is the Caribbean Sea and Anzoátegui State. To the south is Serranía del Interior, Anzoátegui state and Guárico state. To the west is Caracas and Serranía de la Costa of the Cordillera de la Costa, Vargas State and other municipalities of the Miranda State.

== Geography ==
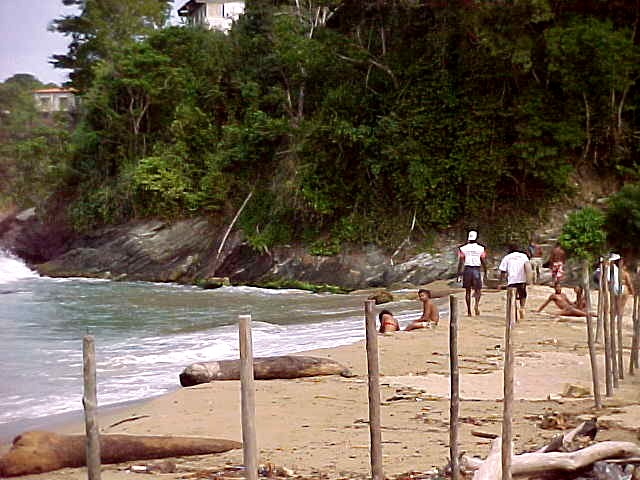
Chirimena

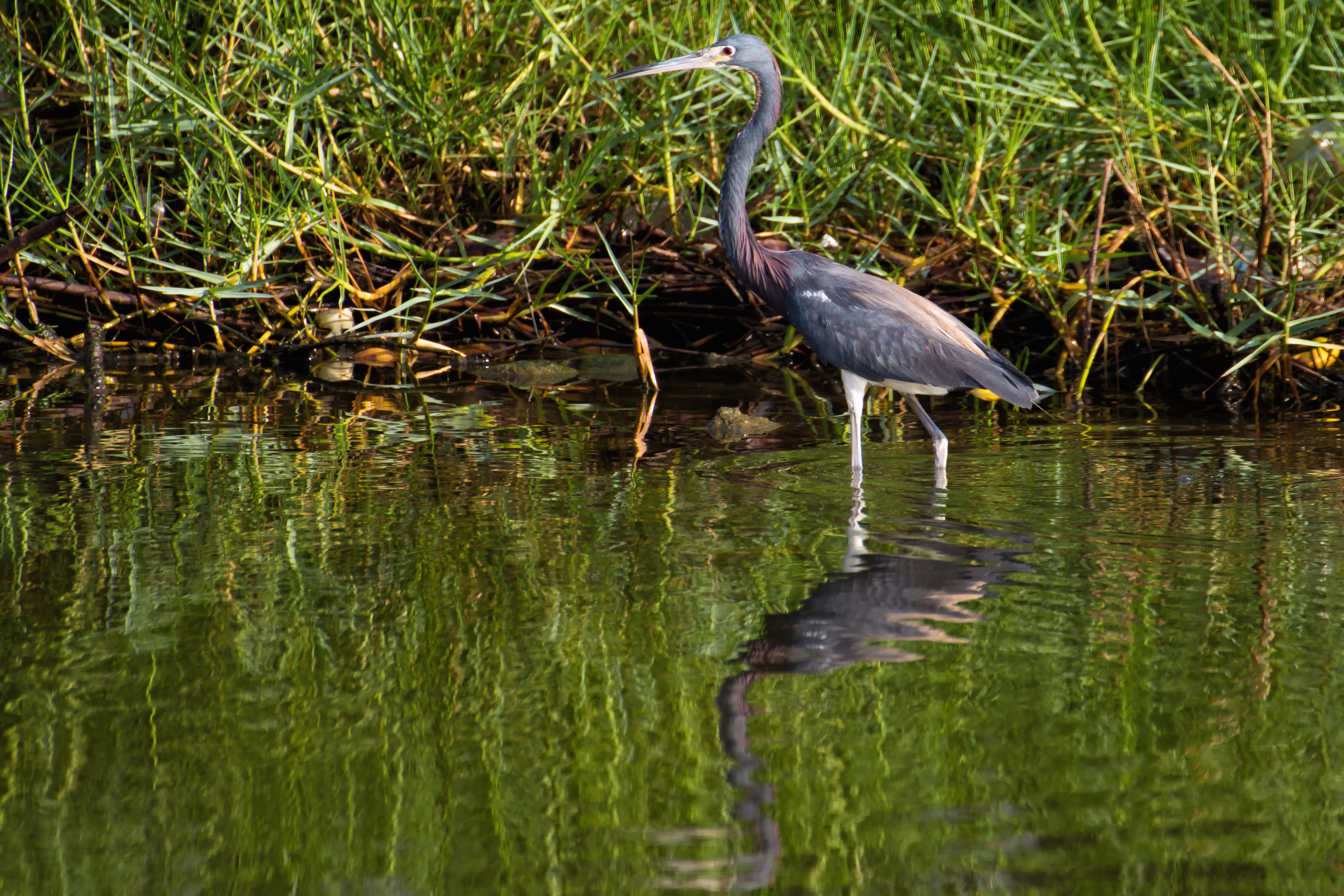
Tricolored heron (Garza Pechiblanca) in Barlovento

Barlovento has an area of 4,647 square kilometres. It covers 58 percent of Miranda state. The Barlovento region lies within the Barlovento depression in the northern coastal region. Its terrain is ranges from the mountains of Caucagua to the beaches of Higuerote and Río Chico.

The exploration of the Plain of Barlovento, which forms the base of the Barlovento depression, was documented by Jesus A. Silva I. It lies between the Valles del Tuy to the east and Anzoátegui state to the west. To the south is the Guárico state. To the north and northeast is Mirandize state. This northern area is rich in limestone. It is formed by deposits from the rivers from the Serranía del Interior mountains in the central region of the Cordillera de la Costa.

Among the slopes of the Serranía del Interior are grottoes, caves and caverns. An example is La Tapa de Cambrai near Birongo. It was discovered by a poacher in 1934 and explored on 9 March 1952 by the Venezuelan Society of Natural Sciences.

Many rivers cross the Plain of Barlovento. The deposition of sediment has allowed the formation of oilfields between Valles del Tuy and Cariaco.

== History ==
Between 1576 and 1810 about 100,000 African people were brought to Venezuela in the slave trade. In Barlovento, the slaves were forced to work on cocoa haciendas of which there were about 4,000. In 1924, the Barlovento and Paria regions grew eighty percent of Venezuela's 20,000 ton cocoa export. Escaped slaves made small hidden communities in Barlovento called cumbes.

== Municipalities ==
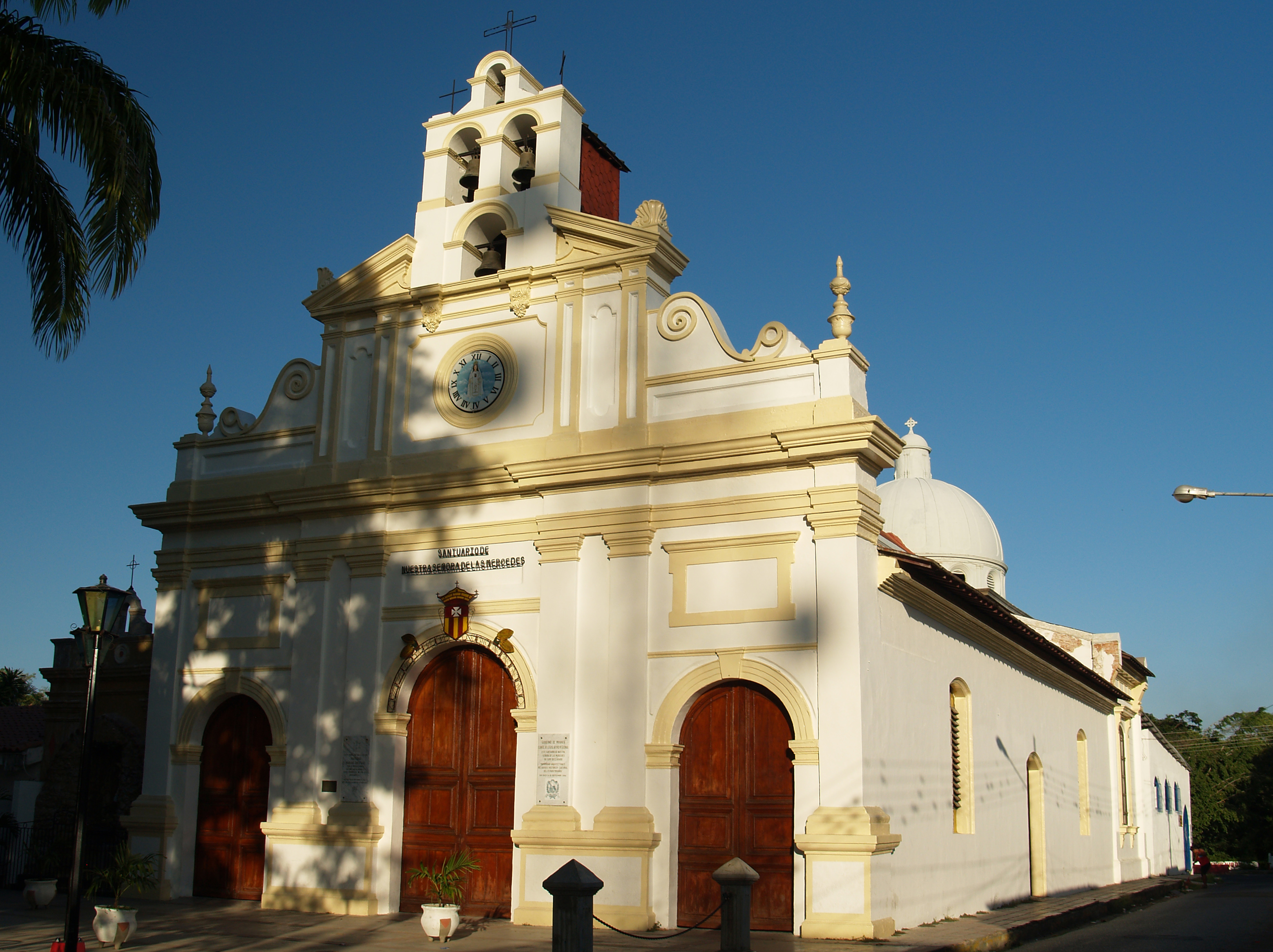
Sanctuary of Nuestra Señora de las Mercedes in Río Chico.

Towns in the region include Caucagua, Capaya, Río Chico, El Guapo, Higuerote, Panaquire, Tapipa, El Clavo, Curiepe, Birongo, Tacarigua de Brión, San José de Barlovento and Cúpira.

Acevedo is the largest, and westernmost, town in the Barlovento region, with estimated population is 150,281. Andrés Bello has a population of 59,342 and the third most rapid commercial growth after Higuerote and Río Chico. Brión Municipality has the fastest growth of the Barlovento region, with an estimated population of 78,940. Buroz has a fairly stable population of 38,945. It has conserved colonial houses and narrow streets. Páez is the second most rapidly growing town with 62,723 inhabitants. Pedro Gual the most east of the towns has a population of 42,831.

== Economy ==
Barlovento was known as the "Granary of Caracas" because of its agricultural production. Crops grown include cacao, beans and plantain. The tourist industry has evolved. Residents of the region commute to Caracas along the Gran Mariscal de Ayacucho highway.

== Transportation and roads ==
Barlovento has a network of paved roads. These include the Bicentenario Intercommunal Avenue, San José-Río Chico, and the Troncal ninth which passes through the municipalities of Andrés Bello, Páez, Brión, Broz and Pedro Gual.

== Religion ==
From the 1500s, the people of Barlovento, plantation owners and their African slaves, developed an avidity for the feast of San Juan. Celebrations with music and dancing were made. Despite the objections of Bishop Mariano Marti to these "ridiculous and earthly diversions" when he visited the region in 1784, the festival continued to gain in popularity. The date of the feast, June 25, aligned with the harvesting of the cocoa bean crop, the onset of the wet season and the summer solstice.

== Culture ==
=== Cuisine ===
The typical cuisine of Barlovento reflects the cultures of the different immigrant groups to the area. The cuisine incorporates local products such as grains, tubers, bananas, fish, seafood, and lapa.

One of the oldest dishes is the Cafunga. It is from the African culture and consists of a banana muffin prepared with cassava, coconut, papelón and anise. Other popular dishes are Tropezón, white beans cooked with pork skins; "Soup of Massey", white with sardines and garlic; and Bañao, cooked ripe banana with caramel made of papelón, anise, and spice clove.

Tacarigua de la Laguna is famous for the preparation of roast Lebranche mullet.

=== Crafts ===
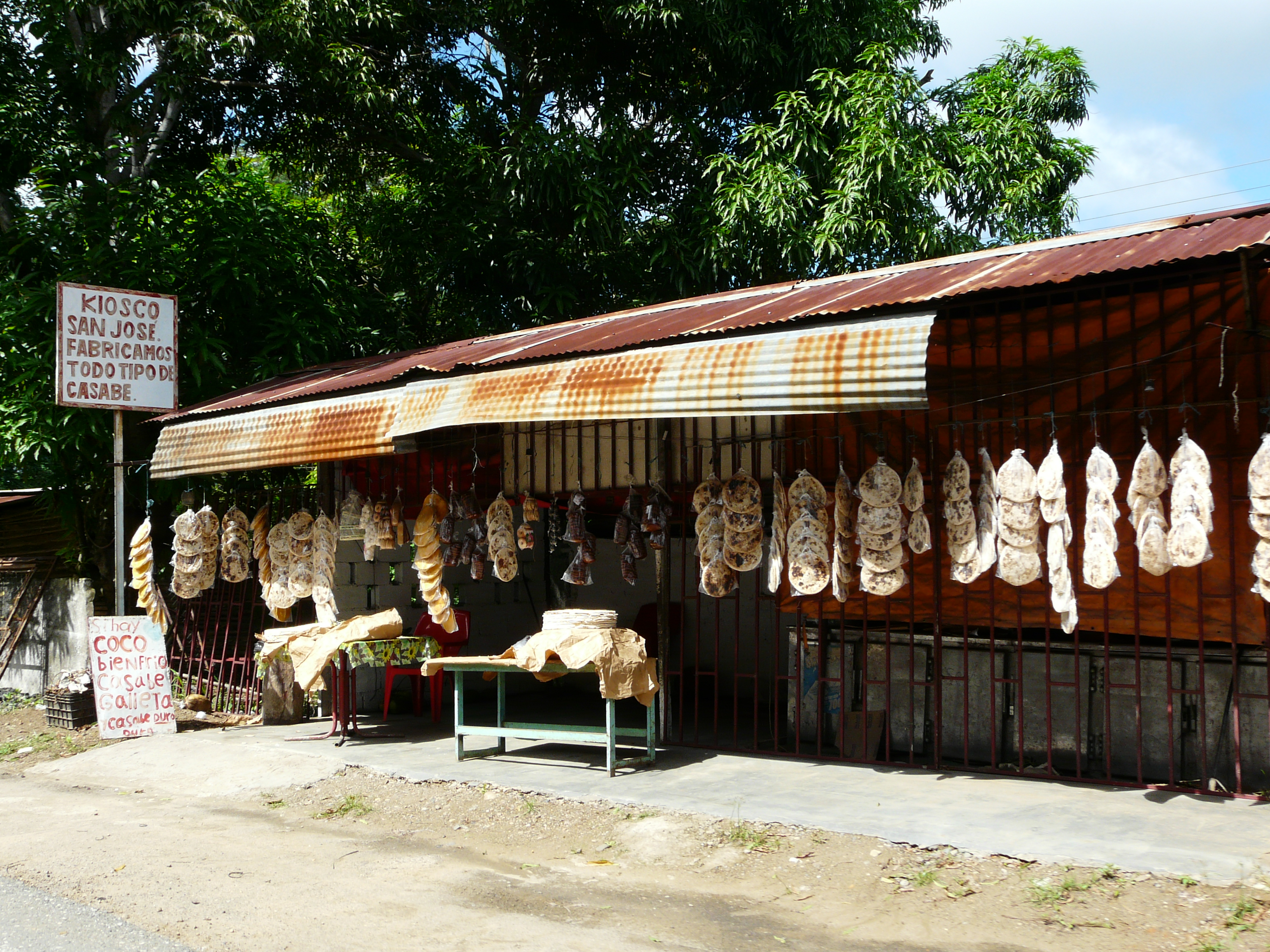
Roadside kiosk in Barlovento

The people of Barlovento make sculptures, replicas and trinkets with balsa wood, other local wood and coconuts. These are sold and informally displayed by the sides of the roads. For example, in the village of Yagura, balsa wood replicas of aircraft and military helicopters are seen. Again for example, in the village of Gamelotal, between Caucagua and Tacarigua de Mamporal (Tacarigua de Brión), Adam Expedito López is a local sculptor working with wood and coconuts. He creates pylons, portraits of Bolívar and coconuts with the faces of caciques among others. In Higuerote, artisans produce in wood the birds of the canals and lagoons of Barlovento, including coro-coras, and herons. Hammocks are also made. In Barlovento, and particularly Curiepe, artisans make drums for African dancing. They include the curbata, the mina and the culepuya. The culepuya has three varieties, the prima, cruzao and pujao. Furrucos are also made for making Christmas music.

=== African drum dancing ===
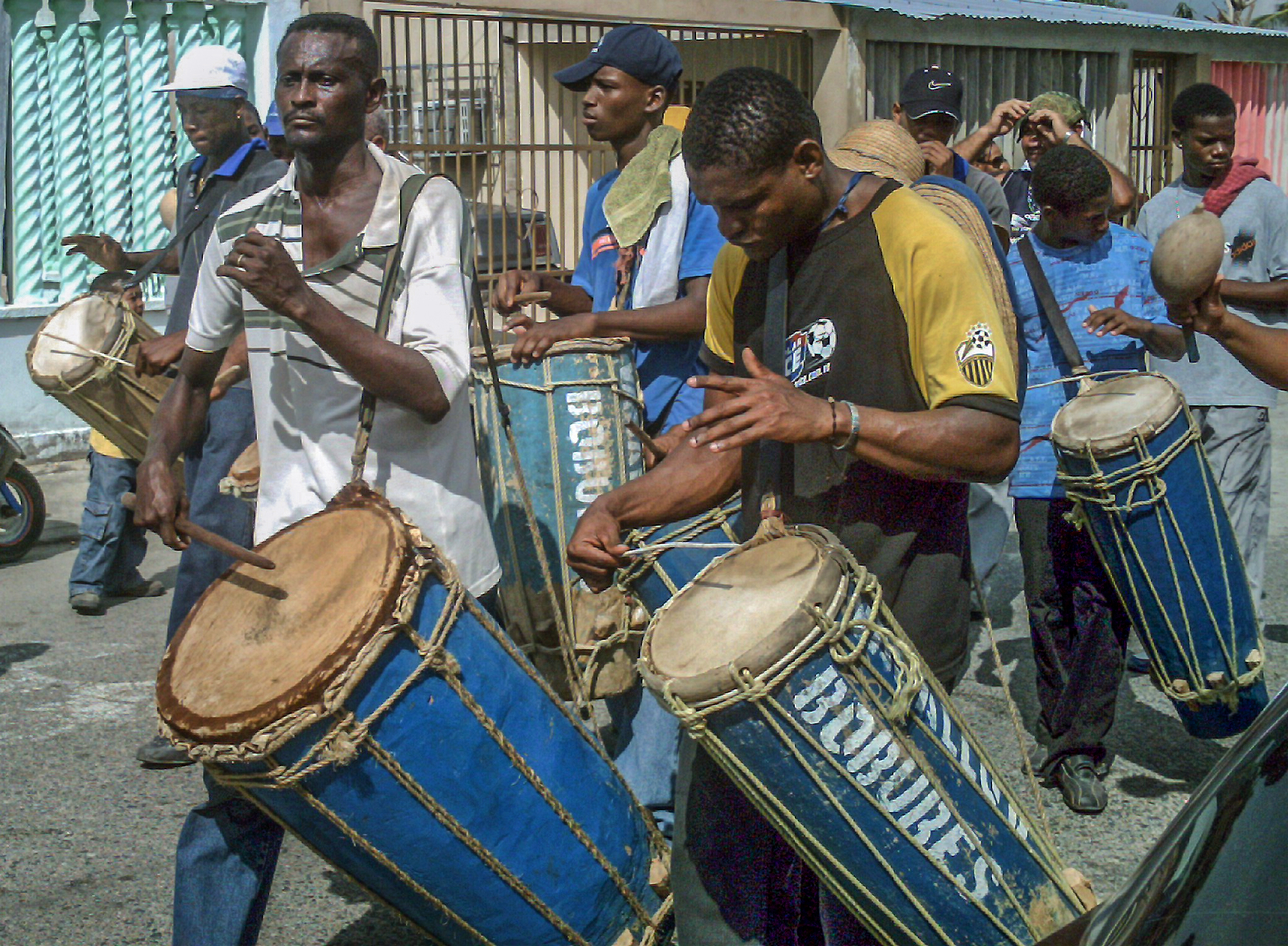
Afro-Venezuelan drumming is part of the culture of Barlovento. Photo from Bobures Lake, south of Maracaibo.

Playing of African drums and dancing to the rhythms ("drum dancing") is an important cultural element in Barlovento. This is particularly so on 24 June of each year, the feast of San Juan (John the Baptist) in the Catholic Church.

Barlovento is the region of Venezuela that is particularly known for this African influence as it was an area, especially the local town of Curiepe, which received African slaves.

== Recreation Sites ==
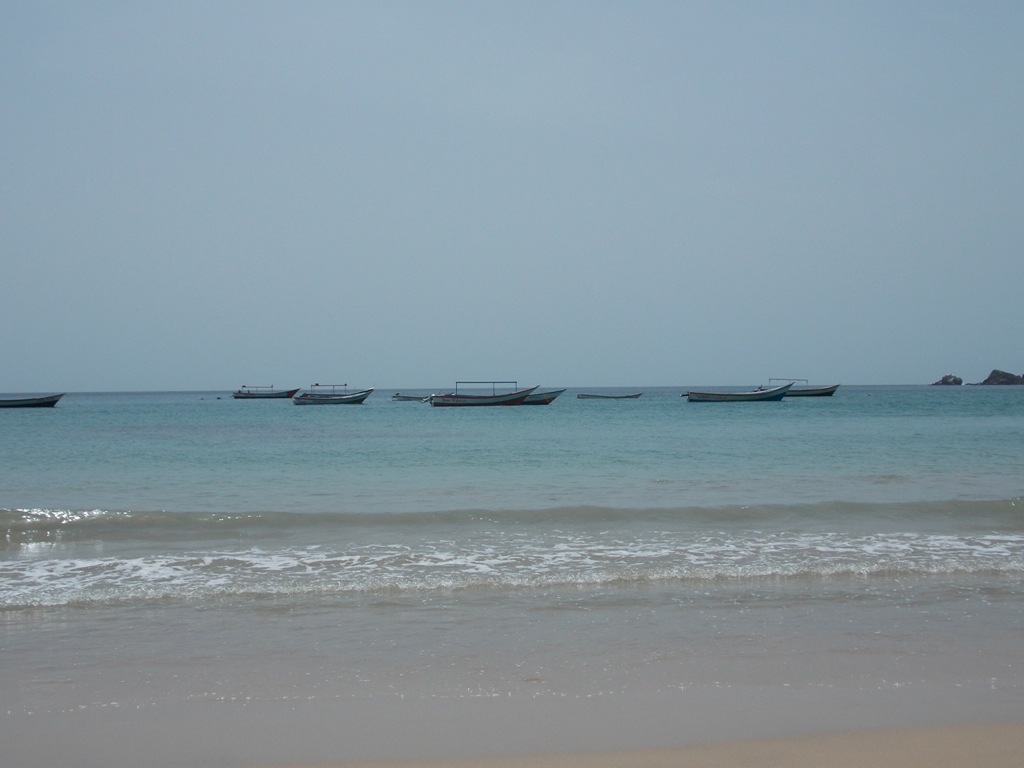
Higuerote, Barlovento

Barlovento has beaches, private clubs, and large residential complexes. its hotels include the AB Beach Hotel, Barlovento Hotel, Campomar, Las Olas Resort, and Aguamarina. Its beaches include Los Totumos, Paparo, La Cangrejera, Chirere, Puerto Francés, Machurucuto, and Playa Pintada.

== See also ==
- Gallegos R. Pobre Negros Espasa-Calpe, Argentina, 1970.
- Sojo J. P. Nochebuenos Negra (1943)
