= 1814 Caracas Exodus =

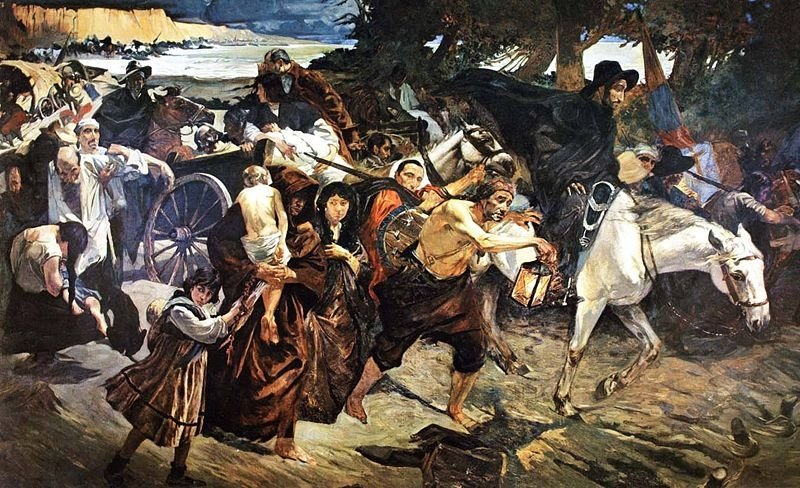
The emigration to the East, oil painting by Tito Salas.

The 1814 Caracas Exodus (Spanish: Éxodo caraqueño de 1814) or Emigration to the East (Spanish: Emigración a Oriente) occurred during the Venezuelan War of Independence, when Venezuelan Patriots and thousands of civilians fled from the capital Caracas towards the East of the country, after the defeat in the Second Battle of La Puerta on 15 June 1814.

News about the approach of José Tomás Boves and his infamous troops caused panic amongst the population in Caracas, so on 7 July 1814, more than 20,000 people emigrated to the East of the country, along with Simon Bolívar and his remaining Patriot troops. Many thousands perished. Although a large number of people followed Bolívar on the long journey, another group, especially the most politically committed, sought refuge in the Antilles or New Granada, while a third group gave up the march and returned to Caracas to place themselves under the protection of Archbishop Coll y Prat.

== Prelude ==
José Tomás Boves had gathered an army in the Southern plains in 1812, composed of Llaneros, released black slaves, mulattoes, mestizos and Indians whom he treated as equals. He lived among his soldiers, and exposed himself to the same risks in battle as them, thereby gaining their extreme loyalty.

Nominally a Royalist, Boves acted independently from Captain General Juan Manuel Cajigal, ignoring some of his orders. His troops hated the white land- and urban upper classes of Venezuela, and became feared for their summary executions, which became especially notorious for their extreme cruelty, even in a period when such actions were common on both sides of the conflict.

After his victory in the Battle of La Puerta, Boves besieged Valencia on 19 June, bravely defended by Francisco Espejo, which for 21 days withstood the onslaught until capitulating before the offer of respect for the lives and property of the Valencians. That same day, Boves ordered some 500 Patriot soldiers to be killed, while the women of Valencia were forced to sing and dance, in an orgy of blood that lasted for several days.

The news of the terrible murders reached Caracas with the announcement of Boves' advance and Bolívar only had 1,200 soldiers to defend the city, many of them wounded. For fear that the slaves in the city would join Boves, he decided to abandon the city of about 30 thousand inhabitants at that time.

== The Exodus ==
On 6 July 1814, Bolívar began the retreat towards the East with few soldiers to protect some 20,000 civilians determined to save themselves from the cruelties of Boves.

On the evening of 16 July Boves entered Caracas proclaiming a general slaughter against the white population, but when he met no resistance, he published a pardon and only those accused of acting against the Spanish were executed. At that same time the emigrants spent the night in Guarenas to continue the next day through Araira towards Barlovento, through the mountains of Capaya, where they took two routes. One path went to Río Chico and along the seashore through Boca de Uchire towards Puerto Píritu, called “the coastal path”. The “inland path” led through Cúpira to Sabana de Uchire towards Clarines through Guanape.

The emigrants arrived in Barcelona at the end of July, but on the way some 12,000 people had died, victims of exhaustion, hunger, wild animals or snake bites, or killed by llaneros, who carried out attacks on the rearguard and killed everyone who couldn't keep up with the column.

Although a large number of people followed Bolívar on the long journey, another group, especially the most politically committed, sought refuge in the Antilles, while a third group gave up the march and returned to Caracas to place themselves under the protection of Archbishop Coll y Prat.

Among the illustrious people of the emigration led by Bolívar were two ladies who later figured in the war, Eulalia Buroz and Luisa Cáceres de Arismendi, who during the journey lost four relatives and only she, her mother and a younger brother survived.

== Links ==
- Quo.mx COMO SE DIO LA EMIGRACIÓN A ORIENTE: UN ANÁLISIS HISTÓRICO
