= Páez Municipality, Miranda =

Páez Municipality Municipio Páez
- Municipality
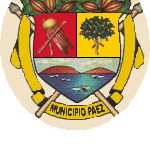
- Flag Coat of arms

- Location in Miranda

- Location in Venezuela
- Coordinates: 10°09′34″N 65°57′13″W
- Country: Venezuela
- State: Miranda
- Municipal seat: Río Chico

Government
  - Mayor: Adrián Rodríguez Monterola (PSUV)

Area
  - Total: 1,128.8 km^{2} (435.8 sq mi)

Population (2007)
  - Total: 39,097
  - Density: 34.636/km^{2} (89.707/sq mi)
- Time zone: UTC−4 (VET)
- Area code(s): 0234
- Website: Official website

Páez is one of the 21 municipalities (municipios) that makes up the Venezuelan state of Miranda and, according to a 2007 population estimate by the National Institute of Statistics of Venezuela, the municipality has a population of 39,097. The town of Río Chico is the municipal seat of the Páez Municipality.

== Name ==
The municipality is one of several in Venezuela named "Páez Municipality" for independence hero José Antonio Páez.

== Demographics ==
The Páez Municipality, according to a 2007 population estimate by the National Institute of Statistics of Venezuela, has a population of 39,097 (up from 33,259 in 2000). This amounts to 1.4% of the state's population. The municipality's population density is 40.6 inhabitants per square kilometre (105/sq mi).

== Government ==
The mayor of the Páez Municipality is Emilio Ruiz, re-elected on October 31, 2004, with 39% of the vote. The municipality is divided into five parishes; Río Chico, El Guapo, Tacarigua de La Laguna, Paparo, and San Fernando del Guapo.
