= Battle of Clarines =

1817 battle in the Venezuelan War of Independence

- Part of the Venezuelan War of Independence
Date	9 January 1817
Location	Clarines 9°56′36″N 65°09′58″W
Result	Royalist victory

Belligerents
Third Republic of Venezuela	Spanish Empire

Commanders and leaders
Simón Bolívar; Juan Bautista Arismendi	Francisco Jiménez; José María Chaurán; Chief Chauràn

Strength
800–1,600 soldiers	~550 soldiers ~330 native archers +10 horsemen

Casualties and losses
~900	Unknown

The Battle of Clarines (Spanish: Batalla de Clarines) took place during the Venezuelan War of Independence. Royalist forces attacked a north-bound force from the Third Republic of Venezuela near the town of Clarines. The outnumbered and poorly armed Royalists secured a victory against the Patriot rebels.

== Background ==
After arriving from Port-au-Prince, revolutionaries Simón Bolívar and Juan Bautista Arismendi gathered a force of 700 soldiers at Margarita Island for a new campaign to take the city of Caracas.

== Battle ==
On 9 January 1817, 10 days after Bolívar's and Arismendi's arrival in mainland Venezuela, the force, which had been bolstered with 900 more soldiers, was on the way to Puerto Píritu. It was there that they were attacked by a Royalist force from an entrenched position near the Unare River. The group had around 890 soldiers, including 330 native archers and 10 horsemen.

During the course of battle, a native force led by José María Charuán, Chief of Clarines tribe, marched through the forest to attack the Patriots from the rear. This outflanking maneuver caused the Patriot forces to panic, scatter and be massacred. Many survivors were driven into the forest, where they drowned or were later captured and executed. In all, around 900 Patriot forces were killed.

The battle was a major loss for the Patriot forces. Few survived the battle, including Bolívar, Arismendi, and five more officers.

== Aftermath ==
Bolívar and Arismendi fled to Barcelona on mules, with Bolívar moving into Guyana to reorganize the Patriot army and prepare for the Second Battle of Angostura.
