= Supreme Court of Justice of Venezuela =

Supreme court of Venezuela

Supreme Court of Justice of the Republic of Venezuela
- Corte Suprema de Justicia de la República de Venezuela
- Artistic representation of the official seal

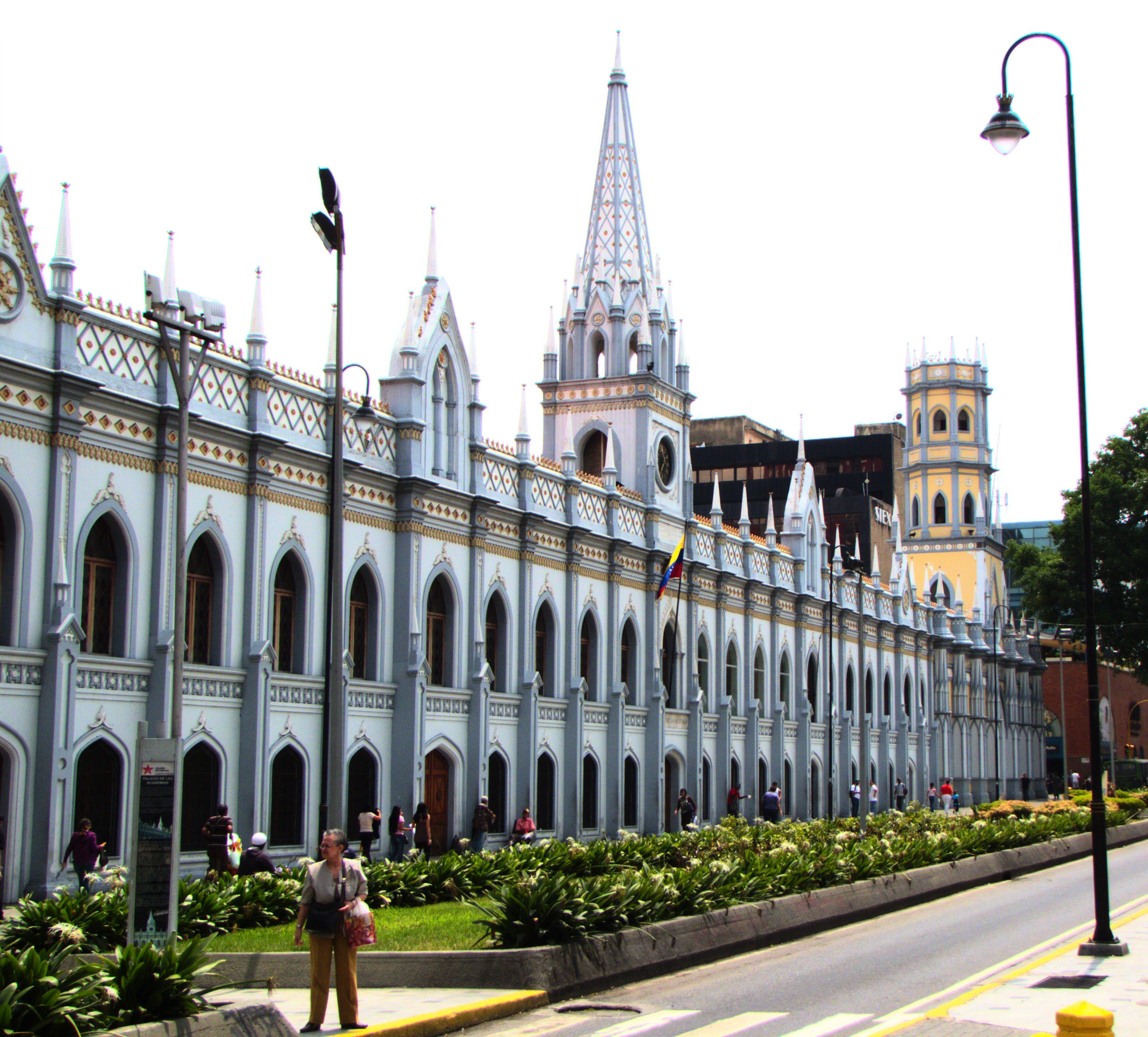
- Palace of the Academies, former seat of the Court
- Established: 1811 (symbolic origin); 1961 (legal establishment)
- Dissolved: 1999
- Jurisdiction: Venezuela, Republic of Venezuela
- Location: Palacio de las Academias, Caracas
- Authorised by: Title VII of the 1961 Constitution; Organic Law of the Supreme Court of Justice (1976)
- Website: www.csj.gov.ve (archived

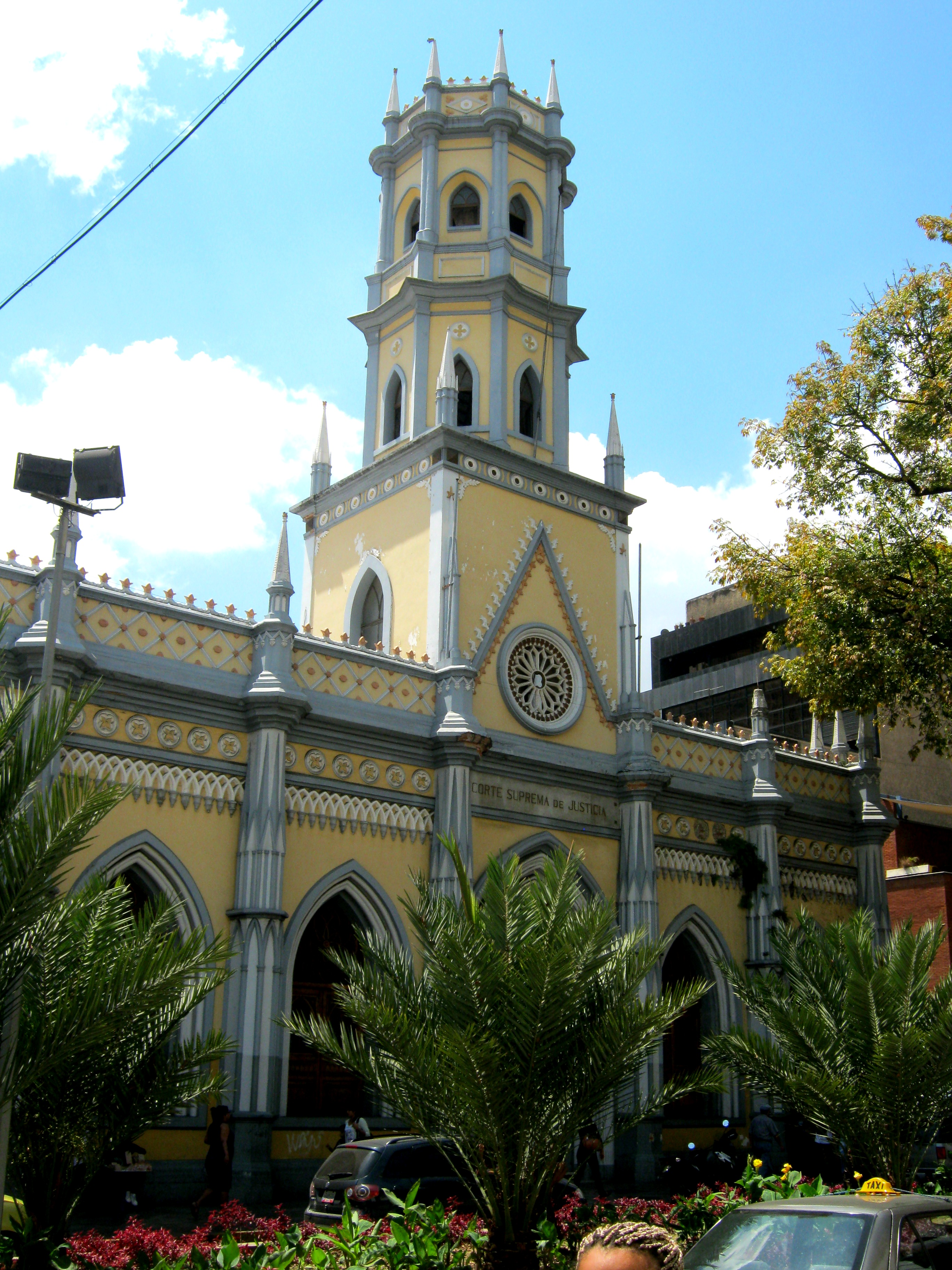
The Palacio de las Academias, former building of the Supreme Court of Justice of Venezuela

The Supreme Court of Justice of Venezuela was Venezuela's highest court until the 1999 Constitution of Venezuela replaced it with the Supreme Tribunal of Justice.

Under the 1961 Constitution of Venezuela, Supreme Court justices were elected by joint session of Congress (Venezuelan Senate and Venezuelan Chamber of Deputies) to nine-year terms, with a third of the court renewed every three years. Lower court judges were initially appointed by the President of Venezuela in combination with an administrative arm of the Court, but during the 1969-74 term of Rafael Caldera, the opposition-dominated Congress moved appointment powers to a Judicial Council with representatives of all three branches of government, but with a legislative majority.

In 1992 "The Court found itself greatly discredited because of its refusal to act on charges of corruption against former president Jaime Lusinchi (1984–1989) and others. Six of the Supreme Court's 15 justices stepped down in the face of a national campaign calling for the resignation of the entire Court. Under considerable pressure during the process of selecting their replacements, Congress discarded the traditional practice of choosing judges closely identified with Venezuela's two largest parties, Acción Democrática (AD) and the social Christian Copei, on the basis of informal agreements. Congress committed itself to selecting independents, and even accepted nominations from lawyers' associations and law schools throughout the country. "Although most of the judges we chose", says Copei's national congressman Luis Guevara León, "were really not 'independent' -- that is difficult to be here in Venezuela -- they were for the first time relatively independent of their respective parties." Five of these six new judges voted in favor of Pérez' indictment. In August, all six voted to press charges against Lusinchi, after the court had sat on the request for his indictment for two years."
