= Brión Municipality =

Brión Municipality may refer to:

- Brión, Spain
- Brión Municipality, Miranda
