= Lake Valencia =

Lake Valencia may refer to the following bodies of water:

- Lake Valencia (Peru)
- Lake Valencia (Pinellas County, Florida), United States
- Lake Valencia (Venezuela)
