= Páez Municipality =

Páez Municipality may refer to the following places in Venezuela:

- Páez Municipality, Apure, in Apure
- Páez Municipality, Miranda, in Miranda
- Páez Municipality, Portuguesa, in Portuguesa
- Páez Municipality, Zulia, in Zulia
