= Tapipa =

- Location within Venezuela
- Coordinates: 10°14′N 66°19′W
- Country: Venezuela
- State: Miranda
- Municipality: Acevedo, Venezuela
- Founded: 20 January 1784
- Time zone: VST
- Climate: Af

Tapipa is a town in the state of Miranda, Venezuela, in the Venezuelan Coastal Range near the Tuy River. It was founded on 20 January 1784 as a settlement for labourers on surrounding cacao plantations. The population of Tapipa is largely Afro-Venezuelan. The 1971 census recorded 891 inhabitants.
