= Higuerote =

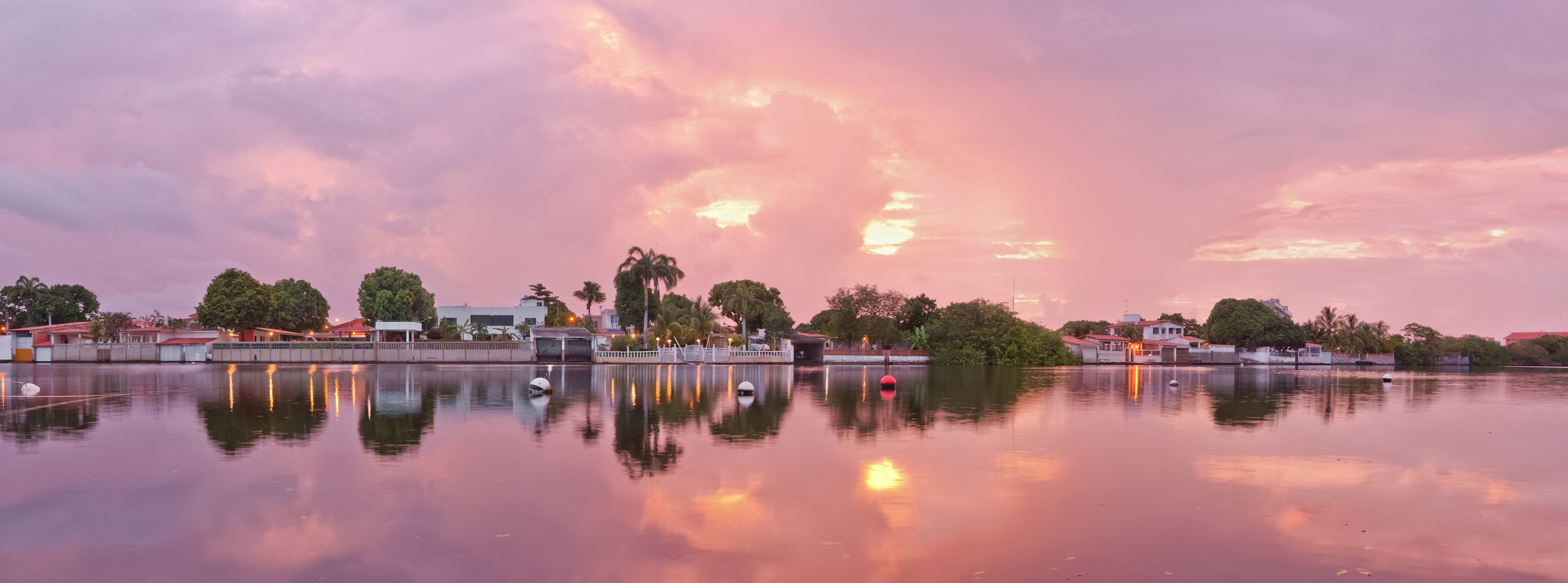
- Dawn in Puerto Encantado, in Higuerote

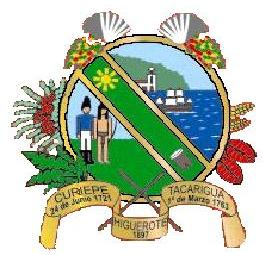
- Coat of arms

- Location within Venezuela
- Coordinates: 10°29′N 66°06′W
- Country: Venezuela
- State: Miranda
- Municipality: Brión Municipality
- Elevation: 1 m (3.3 ft)

Population (2007)
  - Total: 25,000
- Time zone: VST
- Climate: Aw

Higuerote (Spanish pronunciation: [iɣeˈɾote]) is the capital city of Brión Municipality, located in the coastal region of Barlovento, in the state of Miranda, Venezuela, approximately an hour and a half from Caracas.

Its average annual temperature is about 27 degrees Celsius.

== History ==
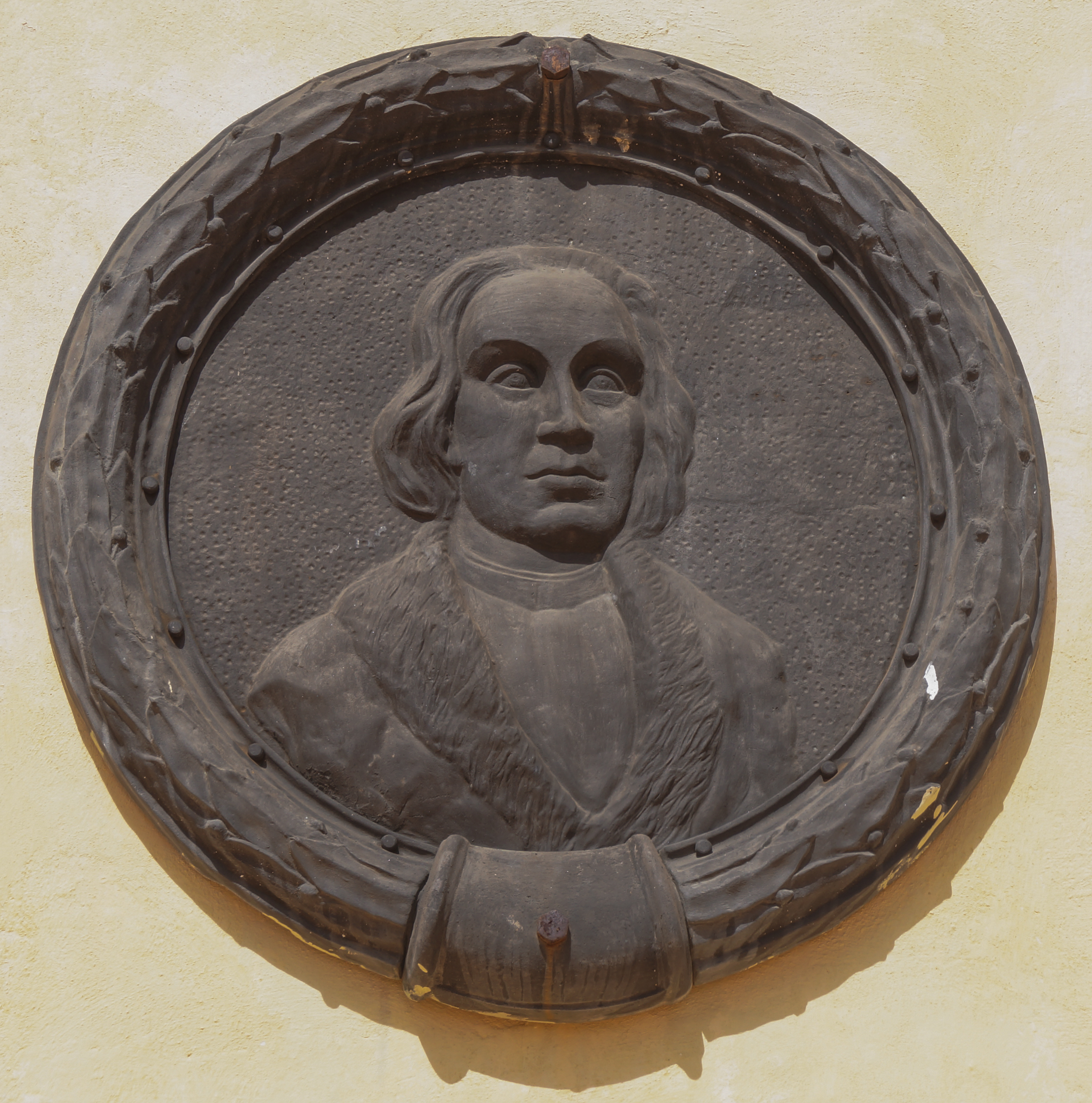
Alonso de Ojeda

The area was sighted by Alonso de Ojeda on his voyage of 1499. The site, inhabited by Island Caribs, has been mentioned since 1515.

Its name comes from the indigenous cacique Igoroto who led the indigenous tribes of the area. Also its name is derived from the Latin origin voice "La Higuera", that is the plant whose fruit is the fig; In addition, it is named after an indigenous tree of this area known as Higuerote, similar to the fig, but smaller and used in America, for the construction of boats.

It was a place of refuge for buccaneers and pirates, and from its waters came the smuggling of cocoa from the Barlovento area.

According to Bartolomé de las Casas, Dominican friar and human rights activist in the Spanish-controlled New World, in his A Short Account of the Destruction of the Indies, an unnamed Spanish adventurer exploited the goodwill and hospitality of the residents of this indigenous chiefdom. He issued an invite to the locals to board his ship, a frequent occurrence with many passing-by Spanish ships. However, this was a trick in order to get many men, women, and children on board so he could sail to Puerto Rico and sell them into slavery. According to Las Casas, this resulted in the destruction of the town and it caused anxiety among Spanish adventurers who lost a hospitable place of refuge in the area.

The place has been a permanent settlement since the middle of the 19th century

== Administration and politics ==
=== Territorial organization ===
- Parish of the Municipality Brión: Higuerote besides being capital, also is parish of the Municipality Brión, besides Tacarigua de Brión and Curiepe.
- Cabo Codera Cape and Puerto Francés: The Carenero Bay, just minutes from Higuerote, is the main supplier of oil and its derivatives from Caracas. Higuerote and Carenero are bathed by brown waters due to the proximity of large river mouths. The majority of its inhabitants are of African origin so they have a very rich musical tradition. One of the best-known festivals in this region is Las Tamboras.

To the west it find Cabo Codera Cape and beyond this we find El puesto de Víctor, the beaches of Chirere, La Cangrejera and finally the Aricagua river. The Cabo Codera Cape works like a giant barrier that prevents that the brown waters that pour out of the rivers diffuse towards the west, explaining thus the bright blue color that has the sea in the zone of El Banquito.

About 30 km north of the city is the Farallón Centinela, a large white and solitary rock of 3200 m^{2} that emerges 28 meters above the sea.

== Main sights ==
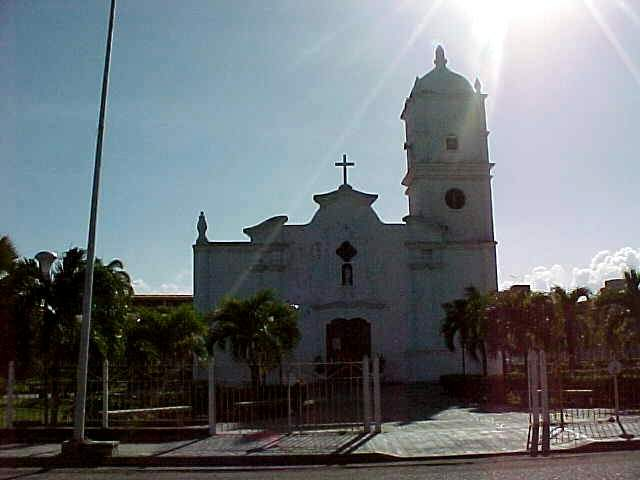
Iglesia de Nuestra Señora del Carmen church

The Iglesia de Nuestra Señora del Carmen church, along with Plaza Bolívar square, the modern Plaza Francisco de Miranda square (inaugurated in 2009) and the different beaches of the town, are among the attractions of this town, which celebrates its patron saint festivities each year from 16 to 22 July, with different religious events and celebrations. Like several coastal towns and cities in Venezuela, Higuerote has a musical tradition, highlighting Afro-Caribbean rhythms, especially the Tambor.

Surrounded by beaches, lagoons, natural channels, housing, commerce, urban spaces, shopping centers, tourist developments, inns, hotels, marinas, clubs, spas, restaurants, beach kiosks, communications centers, banks, ATMs, bakeries, among others, constitute it as a true tourist center.

Higuerote has several beaches at a very short distance, such as Los Cocos beach. Other beaches in the area include: Chirimena, Puerto Francés, Caracolito, San Francisquito, Corrales, Chirere, Buche, and Playa Los Totumos beaches.

It has the sculpture of its patroness virgin Virgen del Carmen at the entrance, a monument about 7.5 meters high; Showing us the religious faith of the inhabitants of the town of Higuerote.

== Beaches ==
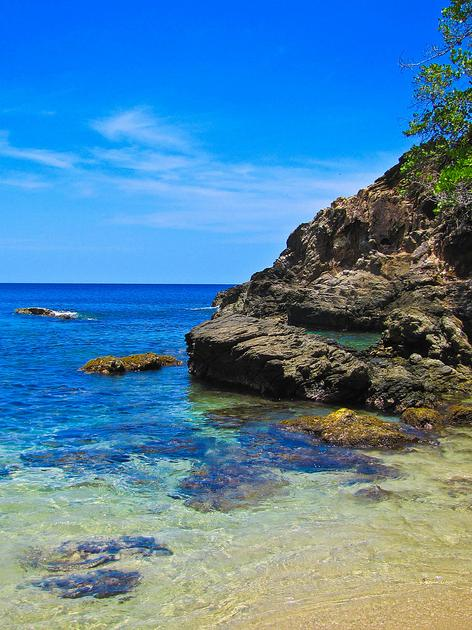
A beach in Higuerote

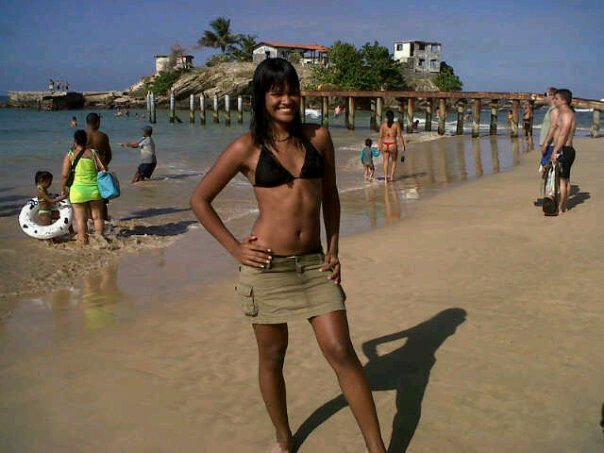
Playa Caracolito Beach

In the area there is a great variety of beaches, which are:

=== Before Cabo Codera Cape, to the East ===
More cloudy beaches

1. * Playa Cuchivano Beach.
2. * Playa Chocolate Beach.
3. * Playa Playita 1 Beach.
4. * Playa Playita 2 Beach.
5. * Playa Buche Beach.
6. * Playa VistaLinda Beach.
7. * Playa Los Totumos Beach.
8. * Playa San Francisquito Beach.

=== After Cabo Codera Cape, to the West ===
More transparent beaches

1. * Playa Puerto Francés Beach.
2. * Playa Caracolito Beach.
3. * Playa Corrales Beach.
4. * Playa Majagua Beach.
5. * Playa Caiman Beach.
6. * Playa Chirimena Beach.

== Fiestas ==
The fairs in honor to the virgin Virgen del Carmen, patron saint of Higuerote, are celebrated on July 16, and there are processions by land and sea, songs, offerings and fireworks throughout Higuerote.

Religious activities in honor of the Virgen del Carmen are organized every year by the Sociedad del Carmen.

== See also ==
- Higuerote Airport
- Barlovento
