= El Café =

- country: Venezuela
- state: Miranda State

El Café is a town in the state of Miranda, Venezuela. It is part of the Acevedo Municipality.
