= List of earthquakes in 1900 =

Earthquakes in 1900
Approximate epicenters of the earthquakes in 1900
- 4.0–5.9 magnitude
- 6.0–6.9 magnitude
- 7.0–7.9 magnitude
- 8.0+ magnitude
- Strongest magnitude: United States, Kodiak Island, Alaska (Magnitude 7.9) October 9
- Deadliest: Venezuela, Miranda (state) (Magnitude 7.7) October 29 25 deaths
- Total fatalities: 35

Number by magnitude
- 9.0+: 0

This is a list of earthquakes in 1900. Only magnitude 6.0 or greater earthquakes appear on the list. Exceptions to this are earthquakes which have caused death, injury or damage. Events which occurred in remote areas will be excluded from the list as they wouldn't have generated significant media interest. All dates are listed according to UTC time. The countries and their flags are noted as they would have appeared in this year for example the Netherlands being in control of present-day Indonesia. An average year with 13 magnitude 7.0+ events being reported. The death toll was low with an event in Venezuela making up the vast majority of the total.

== Overall ==
=== By death toll ===
Rank	Death toll	Magnitude	Location	MMI	Depth (km)	Date
1	25	7.7	Venezuela, offshore Miranda (state)	X (Extreme)	0.0	October 29

- Note: At least 10 casualties

=== By magnitude ===
Rank	Magnitude	Death toll	Location	MMI	Depth (km)	Date
1	7.9	0	United States, Kodiak Island, Alaska	VIII (Severe)	0.0	October 9
2	7.7	25	Venezuela, offshore Miranda (state)	X (Extreme)	0.0	October 29
3	7.6	0	United Kingdom, Santa Cruz Islands, Solomon Islands	VI (Strong)	0.0	July 29
4	7.5	0	Russia, Sea of Okhotsk	( )	450.0	January 31
5	7.3	0	Mexico, Jalisco	( )	10.0	January 20
6	7.2	0	Costa Rica, Guanacaste Province	( )	0.0	June 21
= 7	7.1	0	German Empire, Bismarck Sea, German New Guinea	( )	0.0	September 17
= 7	7.1	0	Russia, Kuril Islands	IX (Violent)	35.0	December 25
= 8	7.0	0	Netherlands, southern Sumatra, Dutch East Indies	( )	0.0	January 5
= 8	7.0	0	German Empire, Bismarck Sea, German New Guinea	( )	0.0	January 11
= 8	7.0	0	Japan, Miyagi Prefecture, Honshu	( )	5.0	May 11
= 8	7.0	0	El Salvador, offshore	( )	0.0	November 9
= 8	7.0	0	Russia, east of the Kuril Islands	( )	35.0	November 24

- Note: At least 7.0 magnitude

== Notable events ==
=== January ===
January
- Strongest magnitude: 7.5 M_{w} Russia
- Total fatalities: 0

Number by magnitude
- 8.0–8.9: 0
- 7.0–7.9: 4
- 6.0–6.9: 1

Date	Country and location	M_{w}	Depth (km)	MMI	Notes	Casualties	
Date	Country and location	M_{w}	Depth (km)	MMI	Notes	Dead	Injured
5	Dutch East Indies, southern Sumatra	7.0	0.0		Depth unknown.		
11	German Empire, Bismarck Sea, German New Guinea	7.0	0.0		Depth unknown.		
14	Dutch East Indies, West Java	0.0	0.0	VII	Magnitude and depth unknown. Many homes in Sukabumi sustained damage.		
18	Russia, Kuril Islands	6.7	35.0				
20	Mexico, Jalisco	7.3	10.0		Some damage was caused in Colima. Landslides were reported in Guadalajara.		
31	Russia, Sea of Okhotsk	7.5	450.0				

=== April ===
April
- Strongest magnitude: 6.9 M_{w} Japan
- Total fatalities: 0

Number by magnitude
- 8.0–8.9: 0
- 7.0–7.9: 0
- 6.0–6.9: 1

Date	Country and location	M_{w}	Depth (km)	MMI	Notes	Casualties	
Date	Country and location	M_{w}	Depth (km)	MMI	Notes	Dead	Injured
24	Japan, Ryukyu Islands	6.9	35.0				

=== May ===
May
- Strongest magnitude: 7.0 M_{w} Japan
- Total fatalities: 0

Number by magnitude
- 8.0–8.9: 0
- 7.0–7.9: 1
- 6.0–6.9: 1

Date	Country and location	M_{w}	Depth (km)	MMI	Notes	Casualties	
Date	Country and location	M_{w}	Depth (km)	MMI	Notes	Dead	Injured
11	Japan, Miyagi Prefecture, Honshu	7.0	5.0				
16	Mexico, Jalisco	6.9	0.0		Depth unknown.		

=== June ===
June
- Strongest magnitude: 7.2 M_{w} Costa Rica
- Total fatalities: 0

Number by magnitude
- 8.0–8.9: 0
- 7.0–7.9: 1
- 6.0–6.9: 0

Date	Country and location	M_{w}	Depth (km)	MMI	Notes	Casualties	
Date	Country and location	M_{w}	Depth (km)	MMI	Notes	Dead	Injured
21	Costa Rica, Guanacaste Province	7.2	0.0		Depth unknown.		

=== July ===
July
- Strongest magnitude: 7.6 M_{w} United Kingdom
- Total fatalities: 0

Number by magnitude
- 8.0–8.9: 0
- 7.0–7.9: 1
- 6.0–6.9: 0

Date	Country and location	M_{w}	Depth (km)	MMI	Notes	Casualties	
Date	Country and location	M_{w}	Depth (km)	MMI	Notes	Dead	Injured
29	United Kingdom, Santa Cruz Islands, Solomon Islands	7.6	0.0		Depth unknown.		

=== August ===
August
- Strongest magnitude: 6.8 M_{w} Japan
- Deadliest: 0.0 M_{w} United States; 5 deaths
- Total fatalities: 5

Number by magnitude
- 8.0–8.9: 0
- 7.0–7.9: 0
- 6.0–6.9: 2

Date	Country and location	M_{w}	Depth (km)	MMI	Notes	Casualties	
Date	Country and location	M_{w}	Depth (km)	MMI	Notes	Dead	Injured
5	Japan, off the east coast of Honshu	6.6	35.0				
11	United States, southeastern Alaska	0.0	0.0		An earthquake originated in Lituya Bay which caused a significant tsunami in the area. 5 people were killed in the ensuing flooding as the waves swept ashore.	5	
29	Japan, off the south coast of Hokkaido	6.8	35.0				

=== September ===
September
- Strongest magnitude: 7.1 M_{w} United Kingdom
- Total fatalities: 0

Number by magnitude
- 8.0–8.9: 0
- 7.0–7.9: 1
- 6.0–6.9: 1

Date	Country and location	M_{w}	Depth (km)	MMI	Notes	Casualties	
Date	Country and location	M_{w}	Depth (km)	MMI	Notes	Dead	Injured
10	German Empire, north of New Britain, German New Guinea	6.8	0.0		Depth unknown. Some homes were damaged.		
17	German Empire, Bismarck Sea, German New Guinea	7.1	0.0		Depth unknown. Minor material damage was caused.		

=== October ===
October
- Strongest magnitude: 7.9 M_{w} United States
- Deadliest: 7.7 M_{w} Venezuela; 25 deaths
- Total fatalities: 30

Number by magnitude
- 8.0–8.9: 0
- 7.0–7.9: 2
- 6.0–6.9: 1

Date	Country and location	M_{w}	Depth (km)	MMI	Notes	Casualties	
Date	Country and location	M_{w}	Depth (km)	MMI	Notes	Dead	Injured
7	Dutch East Indies, Papua (province)	6.9	0.0		Depth unknown. A tsunami washed ashore at Yapen leaving 5 people dead and the destruction of 1 home.	5	
9	United States, Kodiak Island, Alaska	7.9	0.0	VIII	Largest event in 1900. Depth unknown. Property and infrastructure damage was caused on Kodiak Island.		
29	Venezuela, offshore Miranda (state)	7.7	0.0	X	Deadliest event in 1900. Depth unknown. Further information: 1900 San Narciso earthquake.	25	

=== November ===
November
- Strongest magnitude: 7.0 M_{w} 2 events
- Total fatalities: 0

Number by magnitude
- 8.0–8.9: 0
- 7.0–7.9: 2
- 6.0–6.9: 2

Date	Country and location	M_{w}	Depth (km)	MMI	Notes	Casualties	
Date	Country and location	M_{w}	Depth (km)	MMI	Notes	Dead	Injured
5	Japan, Izu Islands	6.6	5.0				
9	El Salvador, offshore	7.0	0.0		Depth unknown.		
12	German Empire, Caroline Islands, Federated States of Micronesia	6.9	0.0		Depth unknown.		
24	Russia, east of the Kuril Islands	7.0	35.0				

=== December ===
December
- Strongest magnitude: 7.1 M_{w} Russia
- Total fatalities: 0

Number by magnitude
- 8.0–8.9: 0
- 7.0–7.9: 1
- 6.0–6.9: 0

Date	Country and location	M_{w}	Depth (km)	MMI	Notes	Casualties	
Date	Country and location	M_{w}	Depth (km)	MMI	Notes	Dead	Injured
25	Russia, Kuril Islands	7.1	35.0	IX			
