= Manuel Ezequiel Bruzual Municipality =

Manuel Ezequiel Bruzual Municipality Municipio Manuel Ezequiel Bruzual
- Municipality
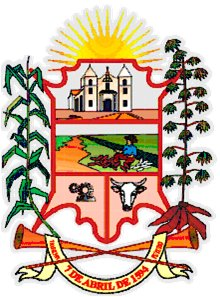
- Flag Coat of arms

- Location in Anzoátegui

- Location in Venezuela
- Coordinates: 9°52′49″N 65°22′49″W
- Country: Venezuela
- State: Anzoátegui
- Municipal seat: Clarines

Government
  - Mayor: Carmen Rodríguez Salazar (PSUV)

Area
  - Total: 1,765.7 km^{2} (681.7 sq mi)

Population (2011)
  - Total: 32,655
  - Density: 18.494/km^{2} (47.899/sq mi)
- Time zone: UTC−4 (VET)
- Area code(s): 0281
- Website: Official website

The Manuel Ezequiel Bruzual Municipality is one of the 21 municipalities (municipios) that makes up the eastern Venezuelan state of Anzoátegui and, according to the 2011 census by the National Institute of Statistics of Venezuela, the municipality has a population of 32,655. The town of Clarines is the shire town of the Manuel Ezequiel Bruzual Municipality. The municipality is named for the nineteenth century military leader Manuel Ezequiel Bruzual.

== History ==
When the Franciscan friars arrived in 1650, there was already a native community at Clarines. Clarines was officially founded on April 7, 1594, by Francisco de Vides, a Spanish adventurer who came from the Huelva Province. The town did not change much until the oil boom of the 1960s. In 1852, the population of Clarines was 4,289, including 72 people identified as white and 3,321 people identified as indigenous. Alfredo Armas Alfonzo, Venezuelan historian and critic, was born in Clarines in 1921 and Jaime Lusinchi, former president of Venezuela, was born in Clarines in 1924.

== Economy ==
The local population practices subsistence farming growing plantains, yuca, beans, china, cotton, cassava, and corn. Until the exploitation of oil, the only exports were cattle and mules. Nowadays, many small companies that service the oil fields that operate out of Clarines.

== Demographics ==
The Manuel Ezequiel Bruzual Municipality, according to a 2007 population estimate by the National Institute of Statistics of Venezuela, has a population of 32,532 (up from 29,228 in 2000). This amounts to 2.2% of the state's population. The municipality's population density is 20.77 inhabitants per square kilometre (53.8/sq mi).

== Government ==
The mayor of the Manuel Ezequiel Bruzual Municipality is Leobardo Canache, re-elected November 23, 2008 with 51% of the vote. The municipality is divided into three parishes; Capital Clarines, Guanape, and Sabana de Uchire.
