= Machurucuto raid =

1967 battle in Venezuela

Date	8 May 1967 – 11 May 1967 (3 days)
Location	Machurucuto, Venezuela
Result	Venezuelan government victory

Belligerents
Revolutionary Left Movement; Cuban guerrillas Supported by: Cuba	Venezuelan National Guard; Venezuelan Army

Commanders and leaders
Fidel Castro	Raúl Leoni

Strength
12	200–300

Casualties and losses
2 dead 2 captured	Unknown

The Machurucuto raid (Spanish: desembarco de Machurucuto, lit. 'Machurucuto disembarking'), also known as the invasion of Machurucuto (Spanish: invasión de Machurucuto), was a battle involving the Venezuelan Army and National Guard troops against Cuban-trained guerrillas.

On 8 May 1967, a dozen guerrillas landed in Venezuela near the coastal town of Machurucuto, with one of them drowning. Venezuelan authorities engaged three of them on the night of 10 May and the battle lasted into 11 May, killing one and capturing the other two. The remaining eight linked up with guerrillas in the Andes who were attempting to overthrow President Raúl Leoni.

== Events ==
=== Landing ===
On 8 May, four Cuban and eight Venezuelan guerrillas sailed into Venezuelan territorial waters in a warship disguised as a fishing boat, disembarking on two rafts once close enough to the coast. They brought with them AK-47s and 10,000 in both U.S. dollars and Venezuelan bolívars, which they planned to hand over to Revolutionary Left Movement forces stationed in the Andes who were attempting to overthrow the Venezuelan government.

Once they landed, the Venezuelans set off to the east, while the Cubans headed back to the warship. However, their raft capsized on the way back, leading to one of them (later identified as Lt. Pico) drowning and forcing the other three to swim to shore.

=== Confrontation ===
Local fishermen found one of the guerillas' rafts and notified the armed forces. On the evening of 10 May, troops found the three Cubans, commencing a battle which ended the following day. Two were captured; Venezuelan authorities stated the contingent's leader, Antonio Briones Montoto, was killed while trying to escape, but the Cuban government has disputed this, claiming he was covertly executed after the fact.

The eight Venezuelans managed to evade capture for 100 days and eventually reach friendly territory.

== Aftermath ==
The two captured Cubans, Manuel Gil Castellanos and Pedro Cabrera Torres, wrote signed confessions detailing the raid. President Raúl Leoni held a conference soon after, where they were shown off to the press. Both of them committed suicide in prison.

Venezuela decided to abstain from invoking the Rio Pact, instead denouncing Cuba and requesting a meeting with the Organization of American States on 15 May. The Central Committee of the Communist Party of Cuba responded on 18 May, stating in a lengthy document that they did aid the guerrillas and that "[w]hat is decided in Washington by the OAS and its master does not matter."

The Revolutionary Left Movement ceased its insurgency in 1969 and became a political party. Dissidents within the group formed splinter movements which continued guerrilla activities, but "their subversive activities shr[u]nk to a minimum" during the 1970's.

== See also ==
- Operation Gideon (2020)
- Cuba–Venezuela relations
