= Higuerote Airport =

Airport serving Higuerote, Miranda, Venezuela

- IATA: HGE; ICAO: SVHG

Summary
- Airport type: Public
- Serves: Higuerote
- Elevation AMSL: 12 ft / 4 m
- Coordinates: 10°27′45″N 66°05′35″W

Map
- Location of the airport in Venezuela

Runways
Direction	Length		Surface
Direction	m	ft	Surface
08/26	1,200	3,937	Asphalt
- Sources: GCM Google Maps SKYbrary

Higuerote Airport (IATA: HGE, ICAO: SVHG) is an airport serving the coastal town of Higuerote in the Miranda state of Venezuela. The runway is 322 metres (1,056 ft) from the shore, and eastern departures and arrivals are over the Caribbean.

This airport was bombed by the United States Air Force on 3 January 2026.

The Higuerote non-directional beacon (Ident: HOT) is located on the field.

== See also ==
- Transport in Venezuela
- List of airports in Venezuela
