= Iglesia de San Francisco (Caracas) =

Historical church in Caracas, Venezuela

Coordinates: 10.5042°N 66.9155°W

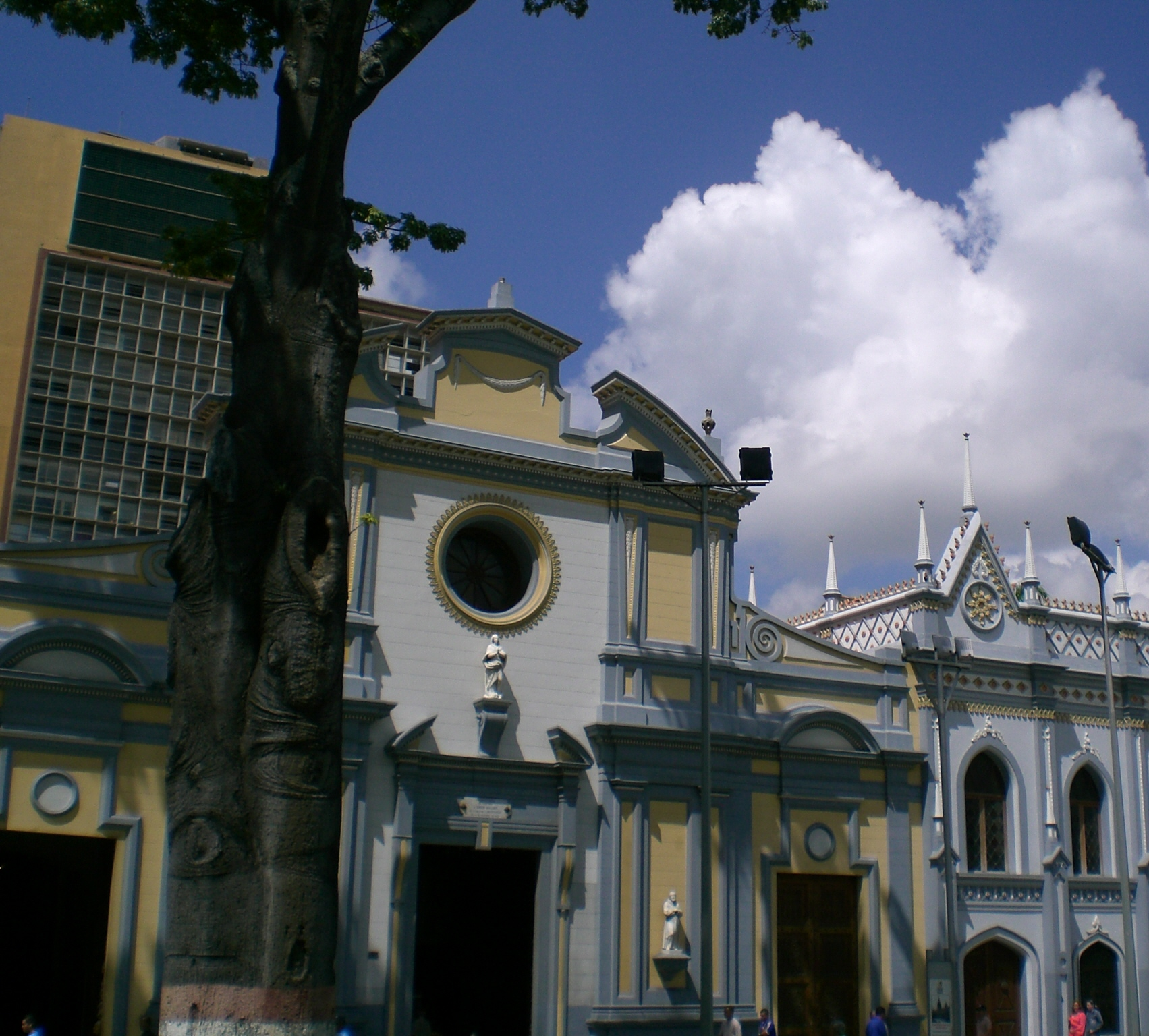
San Francisco Church and the legendary San Francisco Kapok

Iglesia de San Francisco ("San Francisco church") is a church in Caracas, Venezuela. Dedicated to Francis of Assisi, it was built in 1593 under the design of Antonio Ruiz Ullán as an annex of the Convent of San Francisco (now the Palacio de las Academias). The church is notable as being the situ where Simón Bolívar received the title "El Libertador" (1813). His funeral occurred here in 1842. During the 1900 San Narciso earthquake, the church was severely damaged.
