= Páez Municipality, Apure =

Páez Municipality Municipio Páez
- Municipality
- Flag

- Location in Apure

- Location in Venezuela
- Coordinates: 7°10′40″N 70°52′36″W
- Country: Venezuela
- State: Apure
- Municipal seat: Guasdualito

Government
  - Mayor: José Ramírez Segura (PSUV)

Area
  - Total: 12,125.4 km^{2} (4,681.6 sq mi)

Population (2011)
  - Total: 100,125
  - Density: 8.25746/km^{2} (21.3867/sq mi)
- Time zone: UTC−4 (VET)
- Area code(s): 0278
- Website: Official website

Páez is one of the seven municipalities (municipios) that makes up the Venezuelan state of Apure and, according to the 2011 census by the National Institute of Statistics of Venezuela, the municipality has a population of 100,125. The town of Guasdualito is the municipal seat of the Páez Municipality.

== Name ==
The municipality is one of several in Venezuela named "Páez Municipality", for independence hero José Antonio Páez.

== Demographics ==
The Páez Municipality, according to a 2007 population estimate by the National Institute of Statistics of Venezuela, has a population of 111,059 (up from 93,010 in 2000). This amounts to 23.4% of the state's population. The municipality's population density is 8.66 inhabitants per square kilometre (22.4/sq mi).

== Government ==
The mayor of the Páez Municipality is José del Carmen Alvarado, re-elected November 23, 2008 with 76% of the vote. The municipality is divided into five parishes; Urbana Guasdualito, Aramendi, El Amparo, San Camilo, and Urdaneta.
