= Marizapa =

- Coordinates: 10°16′43″N 66°21′29″W
- country: Venezuela
- state: Miranda State

Marizapa is a town in the state of Miranda, Venezuela. It is part of the Acevedo Municipality.
