= Machurucuto =

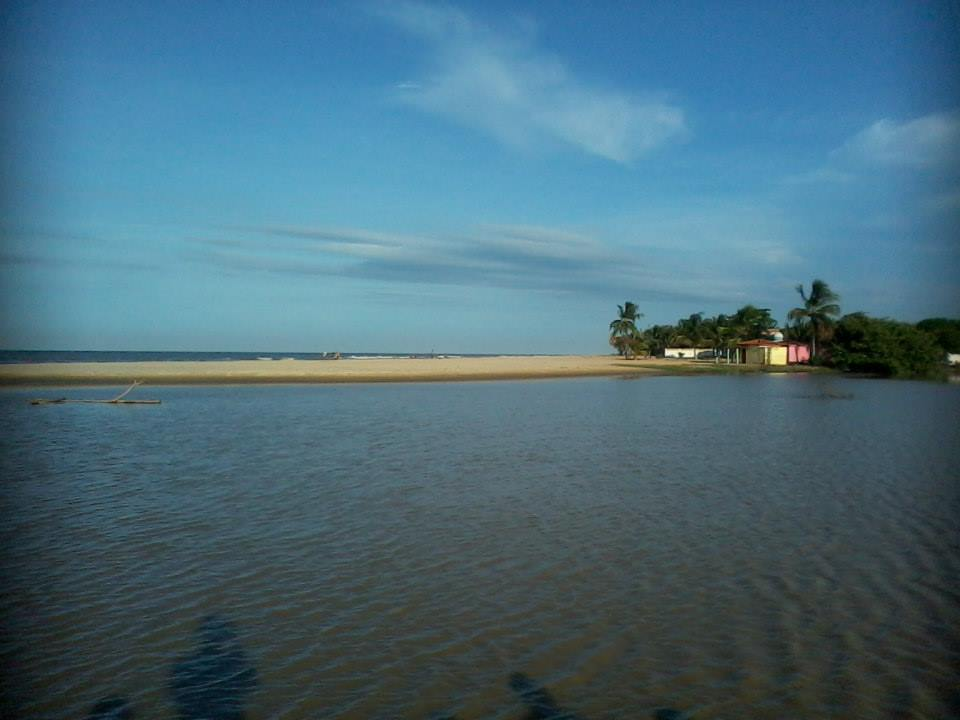
- Beach in Machurucuto

- Location within Venezuela
- Coordinates: 10°12′N 65°38′W

Machurucuto is a coastal town in Miranda State, Venezuela.

== See also ==
- Machurucuto Incident
