= Aragüita =

- Town
- Location within Venezuela
- Coordinates: 9.914444°N 65.193611°W
- Country: Venezuela
- State: Miranda
- Municipality: Acevedo

Aragüita is a town and parish in Acevedo Municipality, Miranda, Venezuela.
