= El Guapo, Miranda =

Town in Venezuela

- Coordinates: 10°09′N 65°58′W

El Guapo is a small town in Páez Municipality, Miranda State, Venezuela. It was founded by Juan Francisco de León on May 16, 1777.

El Guapo began as a town where vegetables and cacao were grown. It is now known for its natural beauty; the local rivers Río Guapo and Río Chuspita attract tourists.

Each year on 31 January, El Guapo residents celebrate the visit of an image of the Child Jesus to Tacarigua Lagoon. The tradition dates back to colonial times.
