= Clarines =

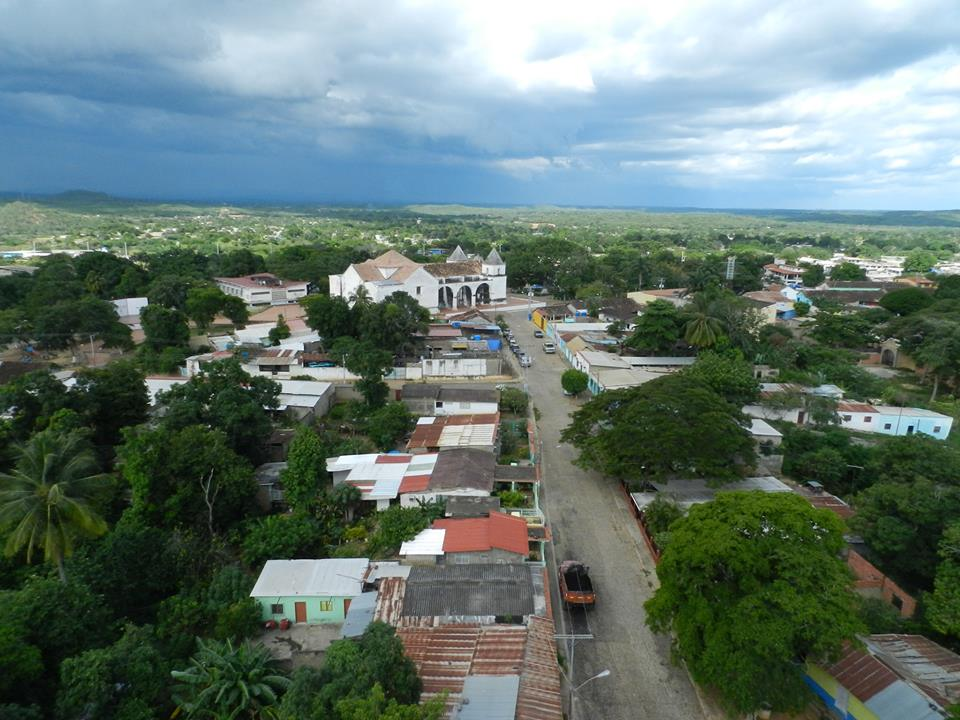

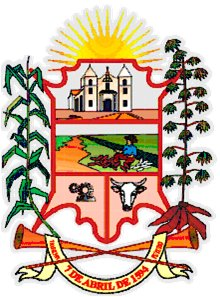
- Flag Coat of arms

- Location within Venezuela
- Coordinates: 9°56′36″N 65°09′58″W
- Country: Venezuela
- State: Anzoátegui
- Municipality: Manuel Ezequiel Bruzual Municipality
- Founded: 1594
- Elevation: 8 m (26 ft)

Population (2007)
  - Total: 15,000
- Time zone: UTC−4 (VET)
- Climate: BSh

Clarines is a town in Venezuela's Anzoátegui State, located on the right bank of the Unare River. It serves as the administrative centre for the surrounding Manuel Ezequiel Bruzual Municipality. It is located on Venezuela Route 11 (Troncal 11) and Route 9 (Troncal 9). Route 9 connects it to Caracas to the west and Barcelona to the east. The town is 80 kilometres (50 mi) from Puerto La Cruz, and 22 kilometres (14 mi) from Puerto Piritu. The estimated population was 15,000 in 2007.

== History ==
When the town was officially founded on 7 April 1594 by Francisco de Vides, a Spanish adventurer who came from the Province of Huelva, there was already a Palenques Indian village there. The town was named after Our Lady of Los Clarines, the patron saint of Beas in Huelva, Andalusia. In 1650 when the Franciscan friars arrived, Clarines was still essentially an Indian village. It was not until the oil boom of the 1960s that Clarines began to change. In 1852, the population of Clarines was 4,289, including 72 people identified as white and 3,321 people identified as indigenous.

Alfredo Armas Alfonzo, Venezuelan historian and critic, was born in Clarines in 1921. Jaime Lusinchi, former president of Venezuela, was born in Clarines in 1924.

== Attractions ==
The Museo de Clarines (museum) has items of historical interest including a collection of armaments.

== Economy ==
The local population practices subsistence farming growing plantains, beans, china, cotton, cassava, and corn. Until the exploitation of oil, the only exports were cattle and mules. Nowadays, many small companies that service the oil fields operate out of Clarines.

== See also ==
- Battle of Clarines

== Sources ==
- Memoria de la Direccion General de Estadistica al Presidente de los Estados Unidos de Venezuela en 1873 [the first national census of Venezuela].
- Morse, Kimberly J. (2003) "When the Priest Does Not Sympathize with El Pueblo: Clergy And Society in El Oriente Venezolano, 1843–1873" The Americas – Volume 59, Number 4, April 2003, pp. 511–535.
