= Lake Valencia (Pinellas County, Florida) =

Lake in the state of Florida, United States

- Location within Florida Location within the United States
- Location: Lake Valencia community, east of Palm Harbor, Florida
- Coordinates: 28°03′45″N 82°43′48″W
- Type: natural freshwater lake
- Basin countries: United States
- Max. length: 485 ft (148 m)
- Max. width: 465 ft (142 m)
- Surface elevation: 46 ft (14 m)

Lake Valencia, a natural lake located in Pinellas County, Florida, is the lake around which the Lake Valencia deed-restricted community of 291 homes was built. This lake is completely surrounded by residences and the west end can be accessed at Parson Brown Lane.

Lake Valencia only has access at Parson Brown Lane. Here a park bench overlooks the lake and the water's edge can be reached. A fountain is in the middle of the lake. However, no fishing, boating or swimming are allowed in this lake.
