= Araira =

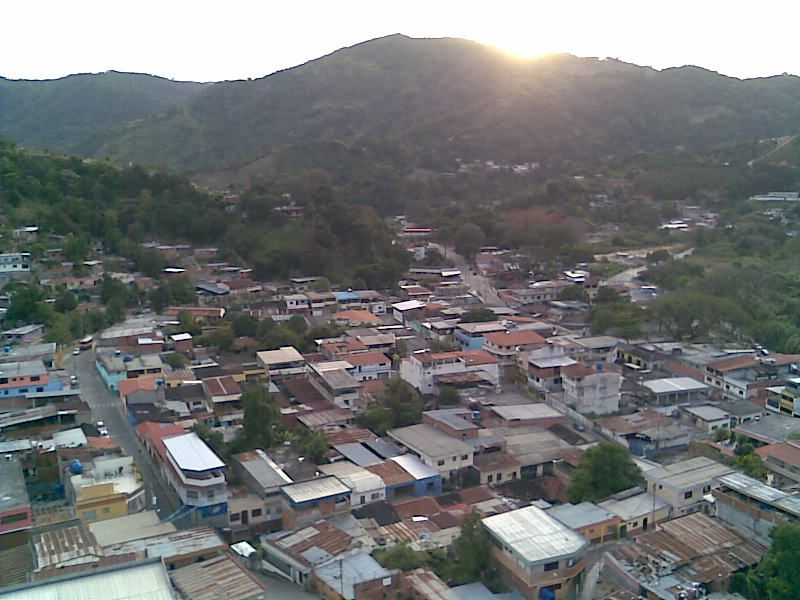
- Skyline of the town

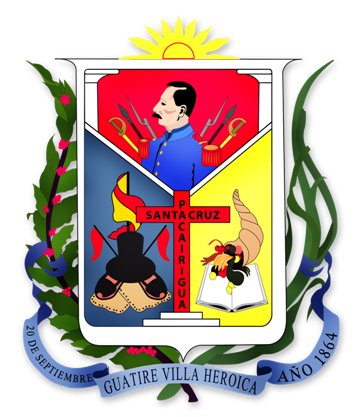
- Flag Seal

- Location within Venezuela
- Coordinates: 10°27′09″N 66°29′06″W
- Country: Venezuela
- State: Miranda
- Municipality: Zamora Municipality

Area
  - Total: 5 km^{2} (1.9 sq mi)
- Elevation: 346 m (1,135 ft)

Population (2001)
  - Total: 25,000
  - Demonym: araireño/a
- Time zone: VST
- Postal code: 1221
- Area code: 0212
- Climate: Aw

Araira is a town in the state of Miranda, Venezuela. A town west of Guatire. The city is 52 kilometers (32 miles) from Caracas.

== History ==
The city was founded in 1864. It already existed as a populated nucleus since the mid -seventeenth century.
