= Alfredo Armas Alfonzo =

Venezuelan writer and historian (1921–1990)

Alfredo Armas
- Alfredo Armas
- Born: Alfredo Armas Alfonzo; 6 August 1921; Clarines, Venezuela
- Died: 9 November 1990 (aged 69); Caracas, Venezuela
- Occupations: writer, critic, editor, historian

Signature
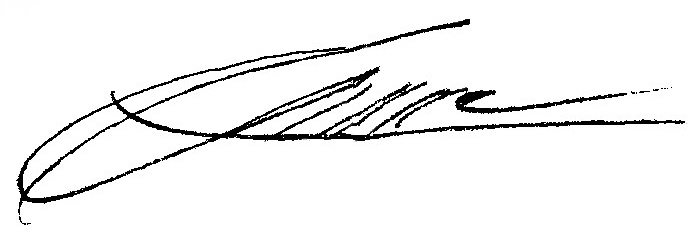

Alfredo Armas Alfonzo (6 August 1921 in Clarines, Anzoátegui, Venezuela, – 9 November 1990 in Caracas, Venezuela) was a Venezuelan writer, critic, editor and historian, well known throughout Latin America. He was a master of the modern fable, a precursor of what soon would be called magical realism.

Alfonzo grew up in the Llanos of interior Venezuela, Clarines, Puerto Píritu and Cumaná, and later attended the first classes at the new journalism school of the Central University of Venezuela in Caracas. He worked for the Postal Service in Barcelona, Venezuela and petroleum companies in new towns established in eastern Venezuela, and worked as the eastern correspondent for the Caracas newspaper El Nacional. He founded the literary magazine, Revista Literaria Jagüey and organized and presided over the first conference of the Venezuelan Journalists Association.

Alfonzo continued to write for various newspapers and to found and direct new magazines, while working for first the government and then Creole Petroleum Corporation. In his fiction, he developed an imaginative style, and he published Los Cielos de la Muerte in 1949. In 1962 he resigned from Creole Petroleum and went to work for the Universidad de Oriente. In 1970 he received the National Prize for Literature, for El Osario de Dios (1969). And in 1970-71 he undertook the job as vice-president of the National Institute of Culture and Bellas Artes (INCIBA). In 1975 he was appointed a member of the organizing Commission of the National Council of Culture (CONAC).

In 1986, in Cumaná, the Universidad de Oriente conferred on Alfonzo an honorary Doctorate in Humanities, in recognition of his exemplary literary work, and his advocation of the value of popular culture and folklore.

Alfonzo's work are known for his own impressionistic quality where the reader is exposed to Alfonzo's world only through brief and fragmentary windows. His characters were not the great and powerful, but were modest persons typically rural and demonstrating a "Venezuelan" character. He was a master of dialog that reflected the vagaries of the human mind, and memory, without descending into pure stream of consciousness. Some consider El Osario de Dios his greatest, or perhaps most groundbreaking, book.

== Published works ==
- Los cielos de la muerte (1949)
- La cresta del cangrejo (1951)
- Tramojo (1953)
- Isla de pueblos (1954)
- Los lamederos del diablo (1956)
- Como el polvo (1967)
- PTC, Puerto Sucre vía San Cristóbal (1967)
- La parada de Maimós (1968)
- El Osario de Dios (1969)
- Los cielos de la muerte (1970)
- Qué de recuerdos, Venezuela (1971)
- Con los brazos abiertos (1971)
- Agostos y otros difuntos (1972)
- Cualquier ocaso (1972)
- Siete güiripas para Don Hilario (1973)
- Cien maúseres, ninguna muerte y una sola amapola (1975)
- Cuentos (1976)
- Las palabras de Guanape (1976)
- La tierra de Venezuela y los cielos de sus santos (1977)
- Angelaciones (1979)
- Uno ninguno (1980)
- Hierra (1980)
- El Tigre: la raíz cercana de la rosa (1980)
- Clarines bien lejos (1981)
- Con el corazón en la boca (1981)
- Hierba (1983)
- Diseño Gráfico en Venezuela (1985)
- Este resto de llanto que me queda (1987)
- Cada espina (1989)
- Los desiertos del ángel (1990)
