= Palacio de las Academias =

Neo-Gothic building in the centre of Caracas, Venezuela

Coordinates: 10°30′15″N 66°54′57″W

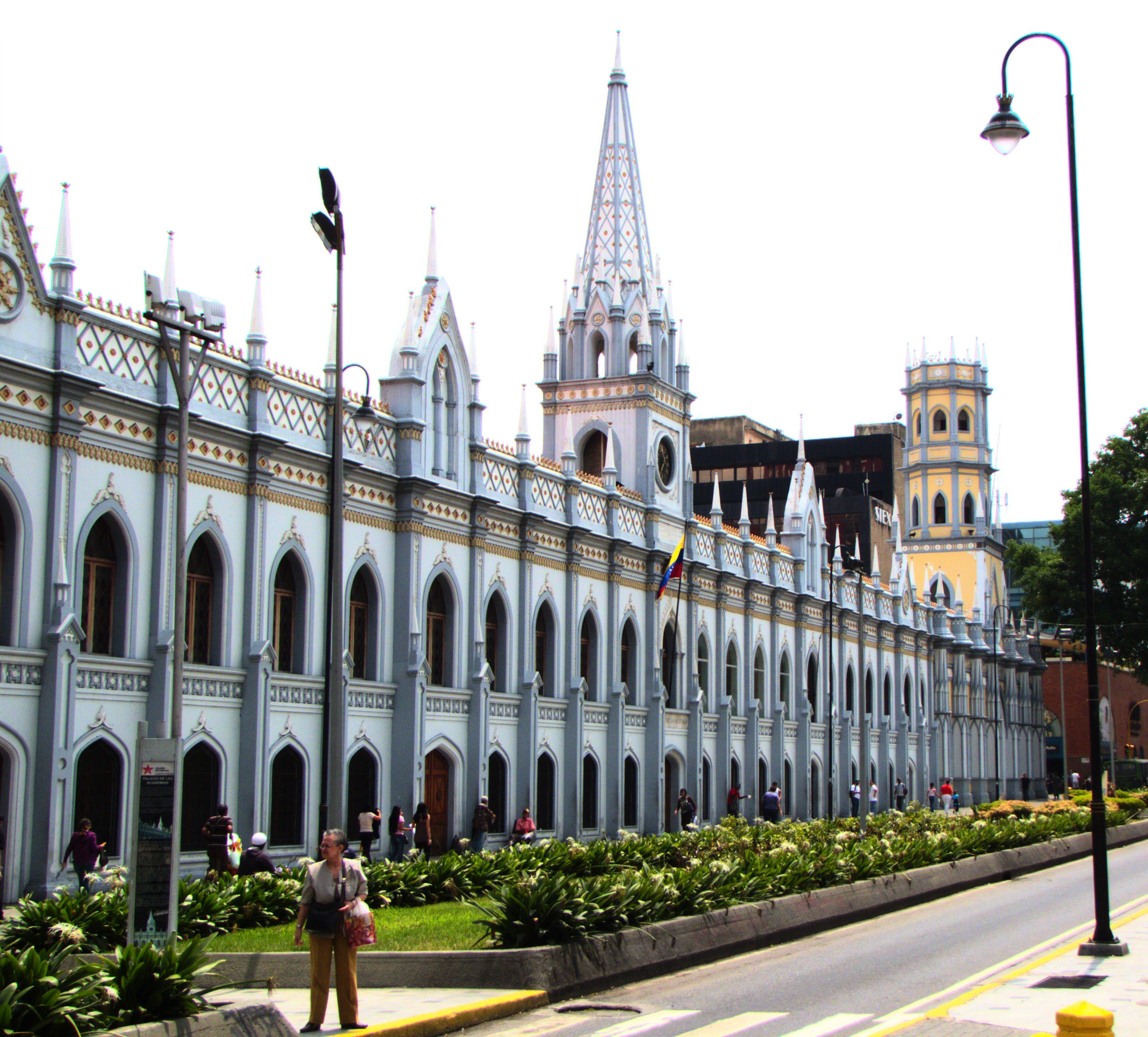
Palacio de las Academias

The Palacio de las Academias (Palace of the Academies; previously Convento de San Francisco) is a Neo-Gothic building on the Avenida Universidad in the centre of Caracas, Venezuela. It dates back to 1684 when a Franciscan convent was built on the site but in the 19th century it served as a barracks, a hospital and a college. In 1876, under President Antonio Guzmán Blanco, the Universidad de Caracas was moved to the building, whose former colonial façade was rebuilt in the Neo-Gothic style. After the university relocated to a new campus in 1952, the building became home to the National Academies. In 1965, it was listed as a national monument. The Palacio de las Academias now houses six National Academies, which are the National Academy of History, the Venezuelan Academy of Language, the Academy of Medicine, the Academy of Political and Social Sciences, the Academy of Jurisprudence, and the Academy of Physics, Mathematics and Nature.

== Location ==
The building is located on the corner of Avenida Universidad and La Bolsa in Caracas. It can be reached via the metro at the Capitolio/El Silencio station. The Iglesia de San Francisco (Church of San Francisco) is situated to the right and south of the building and next to the palacio, having been constructed as an annex to the building when it was a convent.

== History ==
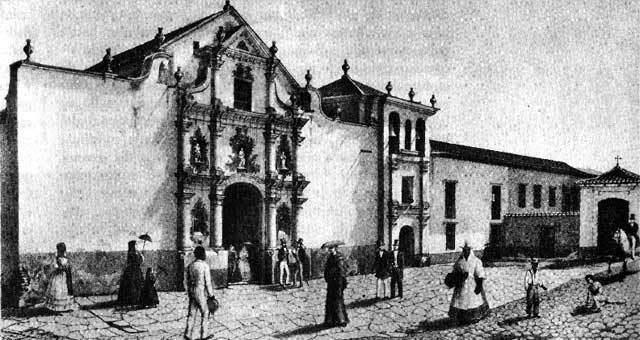
The Iglesia de San Francisco and part of the Convent of San Francisco (1845).

The Convent of San Francisco was the first of many which were built in the valleys of Caracas. Founded in 1576 and built within the next ten years, it was initially under Franciscan friars until 1597 when it was transferred to the Dominicans. From 1673, laymen could study in the classrooms. It was supplemented with another building at the back in 1794, which was damaged during the 1812 Caracas earthquake. By the 1820s, it was one of 40 convents in the city. By 1835, the National Library was situated in the convent. Diego Bautista Urbaneja was the first director (c. 1833–35).

The building gained a new façade in 1876 during the presidency of Antonio Guzmán Blanco. Initially the San Francisco Convent, then the Central University of Venezuela, the building later became known as the Biblioteca or the Central Library. Since the tenure of President Pérez Jiménez, it has been called the Palace of the Academies.

== Architecture and fittings ==
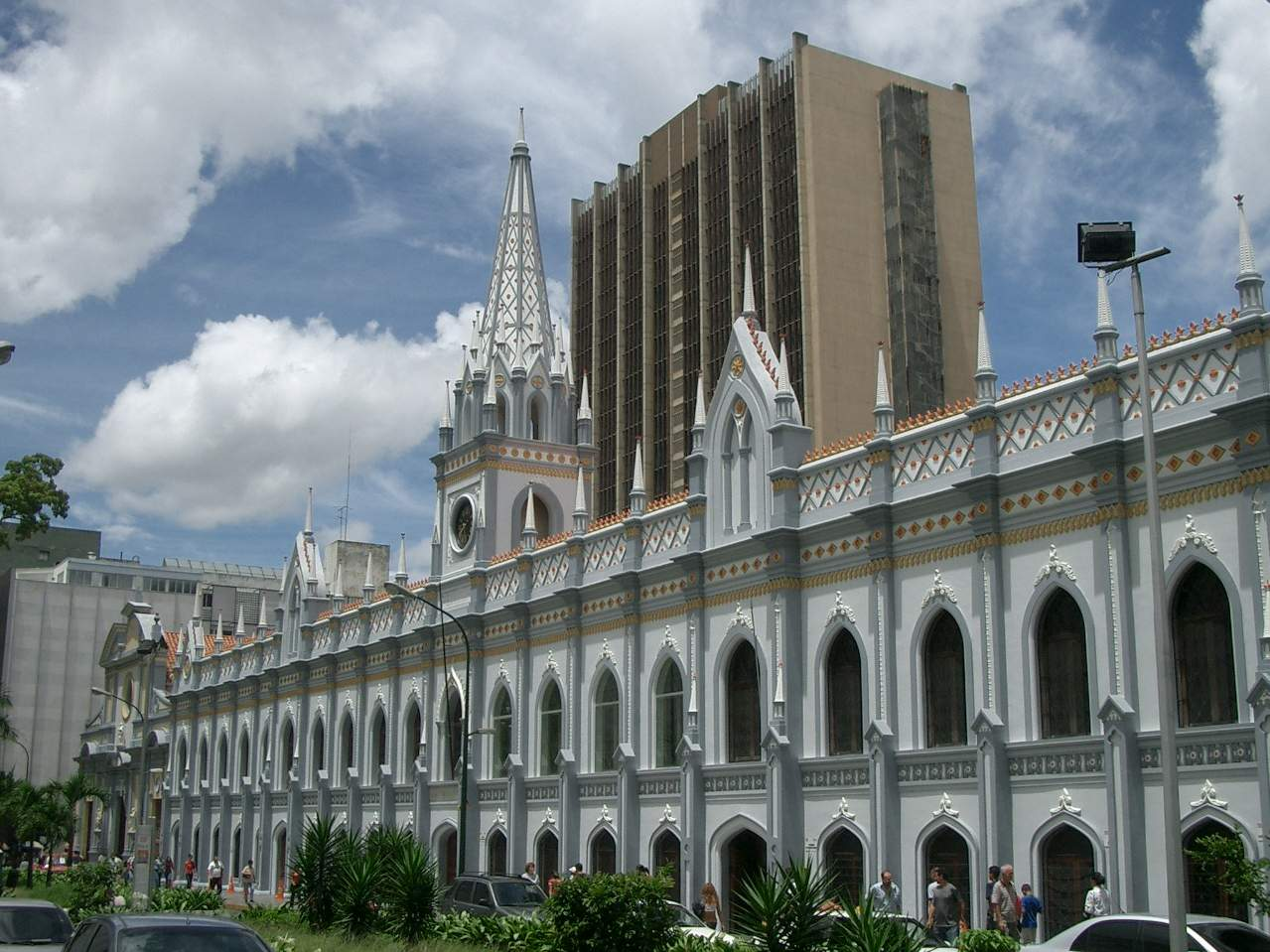
The building, photographed c. 2007

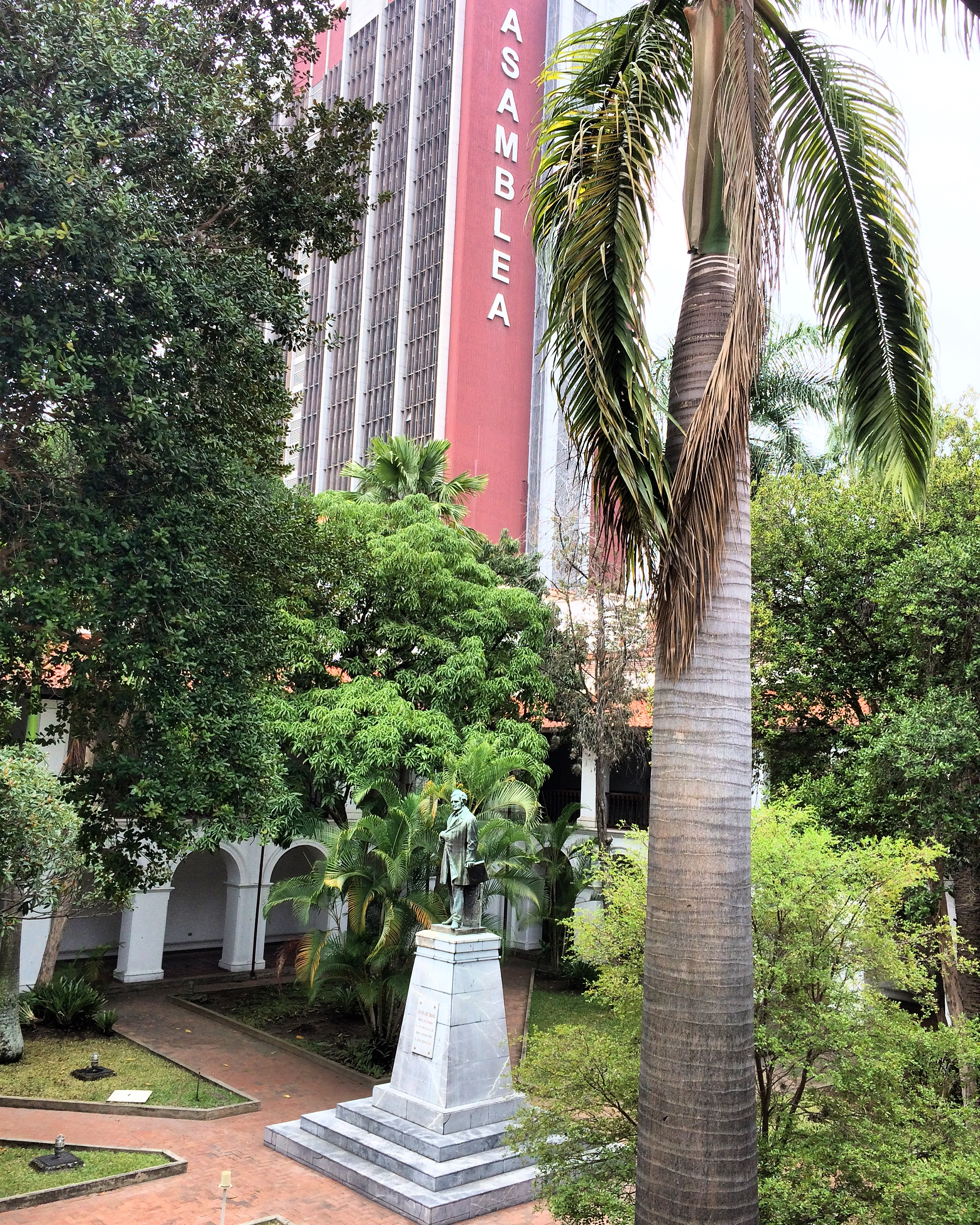
Asamblea Nacional desde el Palacio de las Academias

During refurbishing work in 1876, a south courtyard was added, the north façade was extended, and the interiors were renovated. Luis Soriano and Carlos Toro Manrique were the designated architects. The modifications and additions made were in Neo-Gothic style with spires above the façade's forty bays. A central clock tower was also added, rising to a height of 35 metres (115 ft).

The university auditorium or paraninfo, a sumptuous hall on the north side of the building measuring 32.86 m (107.8 ft) by 6.22 m (20.4 ft), was inaugurated in 1876. It is furnished with three central tables and a baroque tribune, or dais, with a "presidium" (lectern) under an elaborate velvet canopy, all in the Gothic Revival style. The room houses 21 portraits and two busts of famous figures. Among the most significant are Simón Bolivar by Martín Tovar y Tovar (1875), Pope Innocent XIII (artist unknown), Archbishop Francisco de Ibarra (1726–1806) by José de la Merced Rada (1830), Bishop Diego de Baños y Sotomayor (1637–1706) also by Merced Rada, and Philip V of Spain (author unknown). Other paintings depict figures who contributed to the development of Venezuelan culture and government: the lawyer and writer Miguel José Sanz (1756–1814), the Caracas-born Chilean academic Andrés Bello López (1781–1865), the German explorer Alexander von Humboldt (1769–1859), the German linguist and scientist Adolf Ernst (1832–1899) and President José María Vargas (1786–1854).
