= Paparo =

Town in Miranda State, Venezuela

- Coordinates: 10°23′N 65°59′W

Paparo is a town in Miranda State, Venezuela.
