= Río Chico, Venezuela =

City in Miranda State, Venezuela

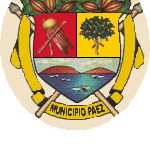
- Coat of arms

- Location within Venezuela
- Coordinates: 10°21′00.3″N 65°58′05.8″W

Río Chico is a city in Miranda State, Venezuela. It is the capital of Páez Municipality.
