= Panaquire =

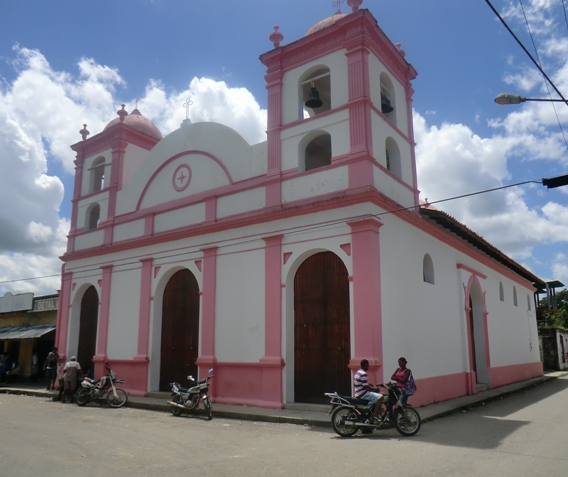

- Location within Venezuela
- Coordinates: 10°13′7″N 66°14′24″W
- Country: Venezuela
- State: Miranda
- Municipality: Acevedo Municipality
- Founded: 1733
- Time zone: VST

Panaquire is a town in the state of Miranda, Venezuela. This town has 5110 inhabitants. It was founded in 1733 by Isleños, but is now largely inhabited by Afro-Venezuelans. Its main industry is cacao cultivation.
