= Caucagua =

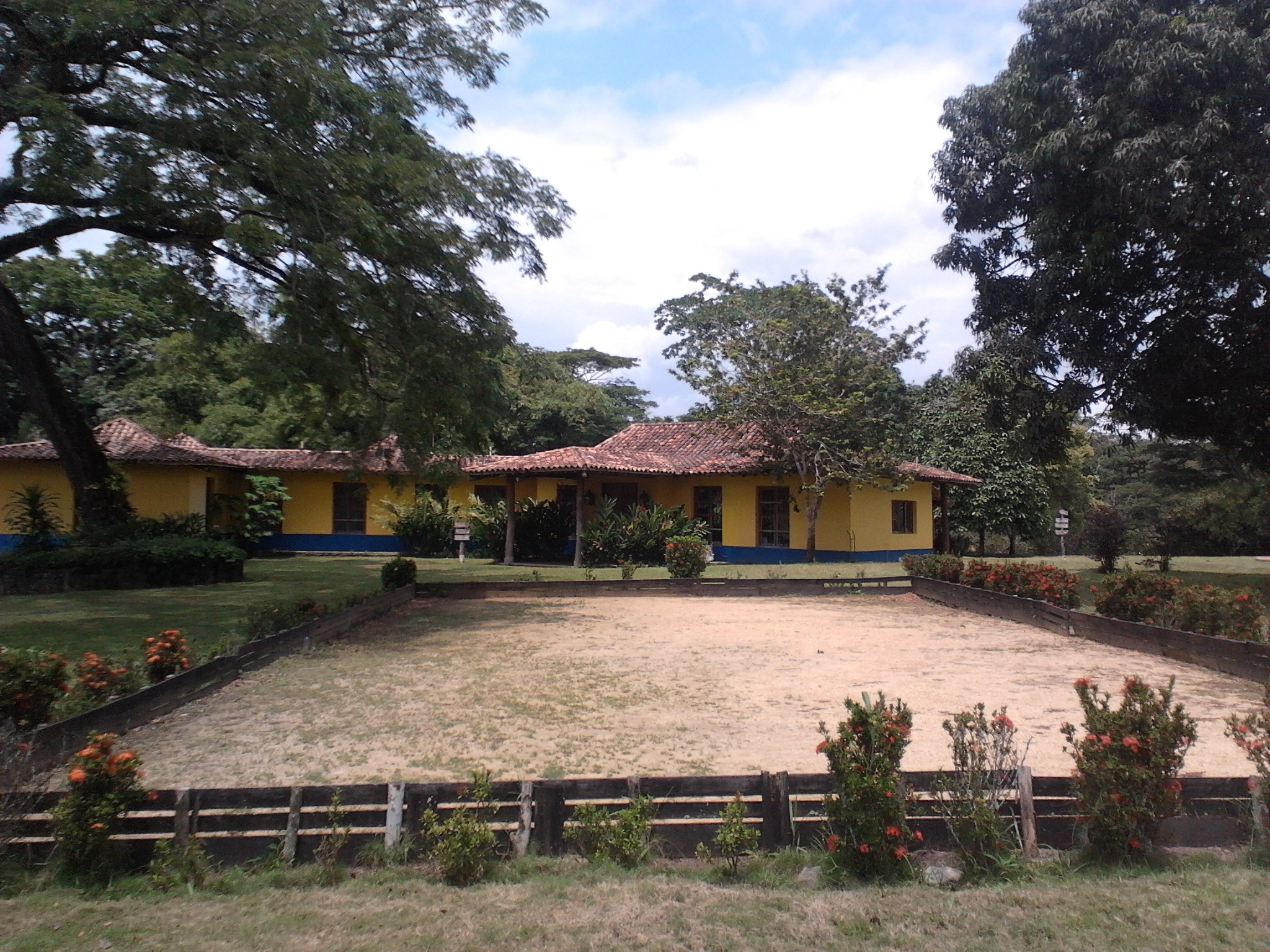
- Colonial Architecture in Caucagua, Municipality of Acevedo

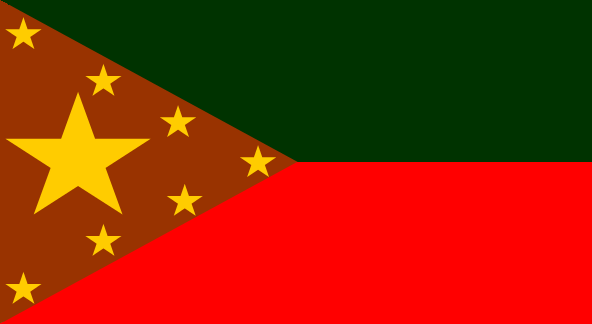
- Flag

- Location within Venezuela
- Coordinates: 10°16′56″N 66°22′38″W
- Country: Venezuela
- State: Miranda
- Municipality: Acevedo Municipality
- Elevation: 280 m (920 ft)

Population (2001)
  - Total: 35,000
  - Demonym: Caucagüeño/a
- Time zone: VST
- Postal code: 1246
- Climate: Am

Caucagua is a Venezuelan city in the state of Miranda, and is the capital of the Acevedo Municipality.

The town of later Caucagua was founded as Valle de Araguata in about 1690. It was refounded with the name of Caucagua in 1752. Bishop Mariano Martí gave it the name Nuestra Señora del Valle de la Santa Cruz de Caucagua in 1784. The population in 1783 was 2,422.

During the 2000 census, the population was estimated to be around 35,000. In comparison with neighboring towns, Caucagua enjoys a fairly strong economic activity thanks to its location at the crossroads between Caracas, the east of Venezuela, and the rest of the Miranda state. The city is also an agricultural nucleus, mainly due to its production of cacao in the bordering areas.
