= Brión Municipality, Miranda =

Brion Municipality Municipio Brion
- Municipality
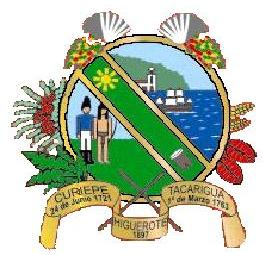
- Flag Coat of arms

- Location in Miranda

- Location in Venezuela
- Coordinates: 10°29′36″N 66°10′35″W
- Country: Venezuela
- State: Miranda
- Municipal seat: Higuerote

Government
  - Mayor: Olga Pacheco Casaña (PSUV)

Area
  - Total: 678.9 km^{2} (262.1 sq mi)

Population (2007)
  - Total: 56,699
  - Density: 83.52/km^{2} (216.3/sq mi)
- Time zone: UTC−4 (VET)
- Area code(s): 0234
- Website: Official website

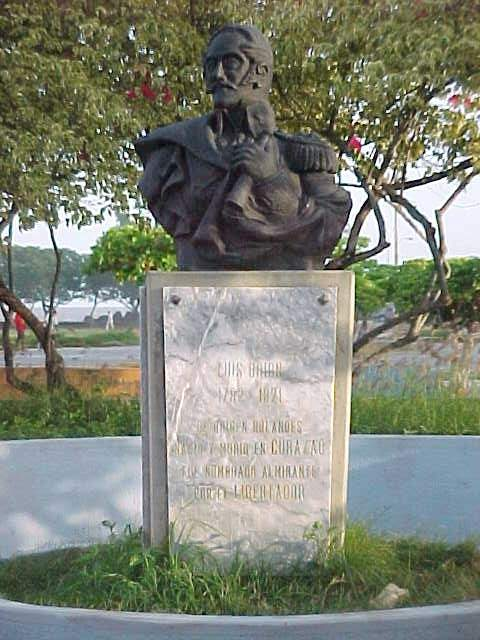
Brion square

Brion is one of the 21 municipalities (municipios) that makes up the Venezuelan state of Miranda and, according to a 2007 population estimate by the National Institute of Statistics of Venezuela, the municipality has a population of 56,699. The town of Higuerote is the municipal seat of the Brion Municipality.

== Demographics ==
The Brion Municipality, according to a 2007 population estimate by the National Institute of Statistics of Venezuela, has a population of 56,699 (up from 48,976 in 2000). This amounts to 2% of the state's population. The municipality's population density is 171.8 people per square mile (106.78/km^{2}).

== Government ==
The mayor of the municipality is Liliana Coromoto Gonzalez Guachi chosen on November 23, 2008, triumphing with 48% of the votes and his her opponent Raimundo Teran with 40% and volume posecion on December 1, 2008, defeating Raúl Ceballos.

Mayors of the municipality and political organizations which have governed (1989 onwards)

- Manuel González: (1989-1992) COPEI (Committee of Political Electoral Independent Organization)
- Domingo Palacios: (1992-2000) (Independent)
- Ramón Ramos: (2000-2004) COPEI-Electors of Miranda
- Raúl Ceballos: (2004-2008) PPT (Motherland For All)-PSUV (United Socialist Party of Venezuela)
- Liliana González: (2008) PSUV (United Socialist party of Venezuela)
