= Acevedo Municipality, Miranda =

Acevedo Municipality Municipio Acevedo
- Municipality
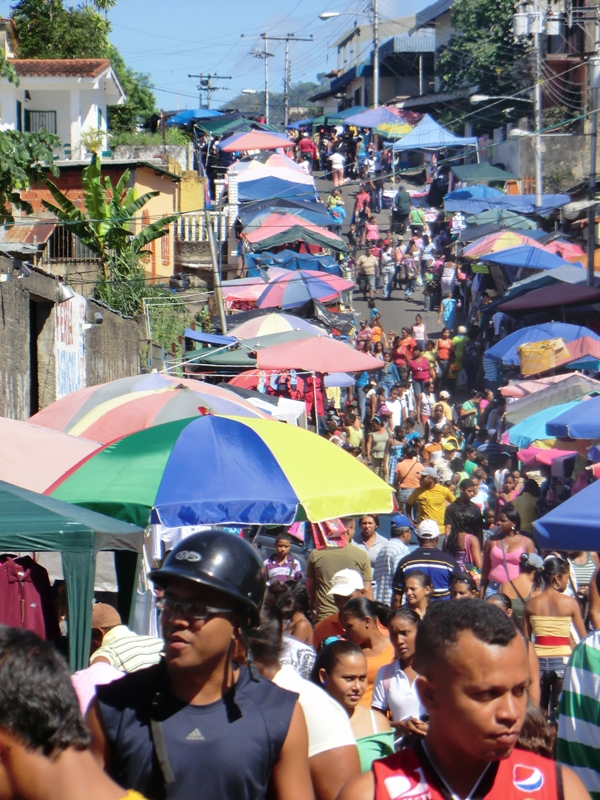

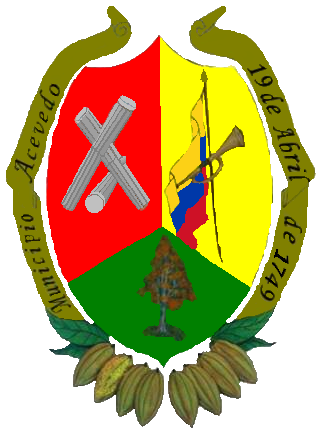
- Flag Coat of arms

- Location in Miranda

- Location in Venezuela
- Coordinates: 10°13′18″N 66°18′39″W
- Country: Venezuela
- State: Miranda
- Municipal seat: Caucagua

Government
  - Mayor: José Oliveros Gómez (PSUV)

Area
  - Total: 1,986.7 km^{2} (767.1 sq mi)

Population (2007)
  - Total: 88,289
  - Density: 44.440/km^{2} (115.10/sq mi)
- Time zone: UTC−4 (VET)
- Area code(s): 0234
- Website: Official website

Acevedo is one of the 21 municipalities (municipios) that makes up the Venezuelan state of Miranda and, according to a 2007 population estimate by the National Institute of Statistics of Venezuela, the municipality has a population of 88,289. The town of Caucagua is the municipal seat of the Acevedo Municipality.

== Demographics ==
The Acevedo Municipality, according to a 2007 population estimate by the National Institute of Statistics of Venezuela, has a population of 88,289 (up from 75,868 in 2000). This amounts to 3.1% of the state's population. The municipality's population density is 46.99 inhabitants per square kilometre (121.7/sq mi).

== Government ==
The mayor of the Acevedo Municipality is Juan José Aponte Mijares, elected on October 31, 2004, with 47% of the vote. He replaced Vicente Apicella shortly after the elections. The municipality is divided into eight parishes; Caucagua, Aragüita, Arévalo González, Capaya, El Café, Marizapa, Panaquire, and Ribas.
