= Capaya =

Town and parish in Acevedo Municipality, Venezuela

- Town and parish
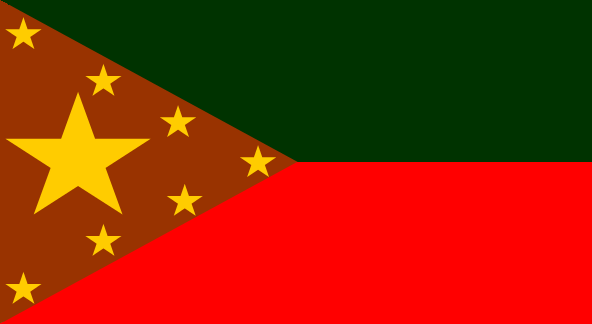
- Flag

- Location within Venezuela
- Coordinates: 10.4286°N 66.2717°W
- Country: Venezuela
- State: Miranda
- Municipality: Acevedo Municipality

Population (2011)
  - Total: 13,151
- Time zone: UTC -4:00

Capaya is a town and parish in Acevedo Municipality, Miranda, Venezuela. It is located about 12 miles (19 km) east north east of the Caribbean Sea. Capaya is at an elevation of 259.2 feet (79.0 meters) in relation to sea level. As of 2011 census the town's population was 13,151.
