= Unare River =

River in Venezuela

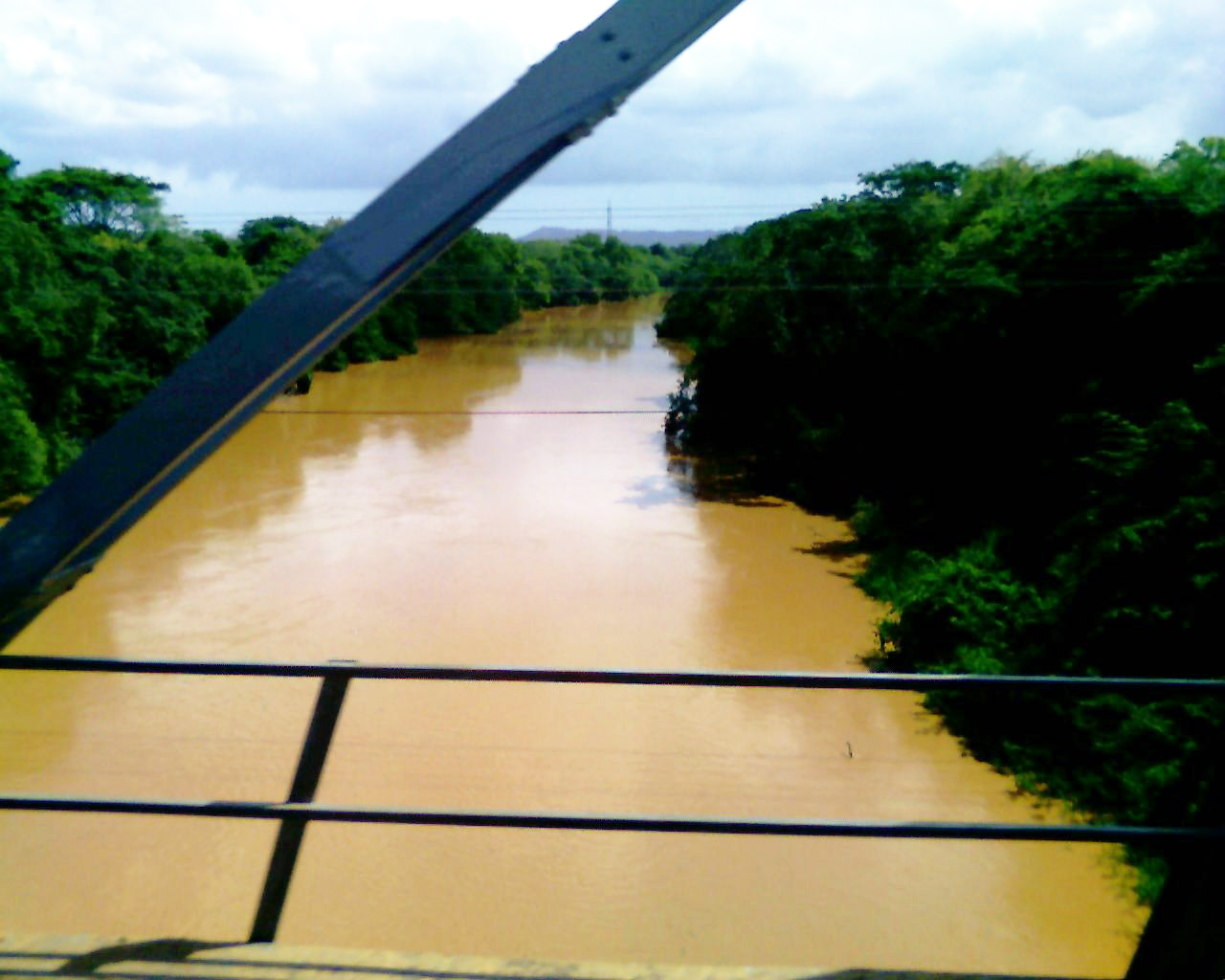

- Location of mouth

Location
- Country: Venezuela

Physical characteristics
- Mouth
  - location: Atlantic Ocean
  - coordinates: 10.0889°N 65.1867°W

The Unare River is a river of Venezuela. It drains into the Caribbean Sea. In the 17th century the Dutch had a fort at the mouth of the river. It was constructed to protect their salt collection in the area. The other Dutch fort ever to stand on what is now Venezuelan soil (also in the 17th century) stood on the little uninhabited islet La Tortuga, just west of Isla Margarita. It was built for the same reason as the one in Unare: to protect the salt harvesting activities of the Dutch. The Caribbean islands St. Maarten and Bonaire (still Dutch up to now) would subsequently satisfy the Dutch demand for salt.

== See also ==
- List of rivers of Venezuela
