= San Pedro, Spain =

San Pedro, Spain may refer to the following places:

== Inhabited places ==
=== Castile and León ===
- Arenas de San Pedro, Ávila
- Campo de San Pedro, Segovia
- San Pedro del Arroyo Ávila
- San Pedro Bercianos, León
- San Pedro de Ceque, Zamora
- San Pedro de Gaíllos, Segovia
- San Pedro de Latarce, Valladolid
- San Pedro Manrique, Soria
- San Pedro de la Nave-Almendra, Zamora
- San Pedro de Rozados, Salamanca
- San Pedro del Valle, Salamanca
- Torre Val de San Pedro, Segovia

=== Castile-La Mancha ===
- Bascuñana de San Pedro, Cuenca
- Peñas de San Pedro, Albacete
- San Pedro, Albacete
- San Pedro Palmiches, Cuenca

=== Other parts of Spain ===
- San Pedro de Alcántara, Andalucia
- San Pedro de Mérida, Badajoz, Extremadura
- San Pedro del Pinatar, Spain, Murcia
- San Pedro del Romeral, Cantabria
- San Pedro de Torelló, Osona, Catalonia
- San Pedro de Vilamajor, Barcelona, Catalonia
- San Pedro, a parish of Viveiro, Lugo

== Religious buildings ==
- Abbey of San Pedro de Cardeña, Burgos, Castile and León
- Church of San Pedro de Nora, Las Regueras
- Co-Cathedral of San Pedro, Soria
- Convento de San Pedro Mártir, Toledo, Castile-La Mancha
- Monastery of San Pedro de Arlanza, Hortigüela, Burgos, Castile and León
- San Pedro (Cordoba), a minor basilica
- San Pedro Apóstol Church, La Línea de la Concepción, Andalusia
- San Pedro de Roda, a former Benedictine monastery, Alt Empordà, Catalonia

== Other uses ==
- SD San Pedro, football team based in Sestao, Basque Country
- Sierra de San Pedro, a mountain range, Extremadura
- UD San Pedro, football team based in San Pedro de Alcántara, Andalusia

== See also ==
- San Pedro (disambiguation)
