= San Pedro =

San Pedro (Spanish for Saint Peter) may refer to:

== Places ==
=== Argentina ===
- San Pedro, Buenos Aires
- San Pedro, Capayán, Catamarca
- San Pedro, La Rioja
- San Pedro, Misiones
- San Pedro Partido, a partido located in the north of the Argentine province of Buenos Aires
- San Pedro Department, Misiones, the largest and most sparsely populated department in the Misiones Province, Argentina

=== Belize ===
- San Pedro Town, a town on the island of Ambergris Caye

=== Bolivia ===
- San Pedro prison or El penal de San Pedro, the largest prison in La Paz, Bolivia

=== Chile ===
- San Pedro de Atacama, a village in the Atacama desert of northern Chile
- San Pedro de la Paz
- San Pedro, Chile
- San Pedro River (Chile)
- San Pedro de Inacaliri River
- San Pedro (Chile volcano)

=== Colombia ===
- San Pedro, Valle del Cauca, a town and municipality
- San Pedro de Cartago, a town and municipality in the Nariño Department
- San Pedro, Sucre

=== Costa Rica ===
- San Pedro, Costa Rica or San Pedro de Montes de Oca, a city in the canton of Montes de Oca, in San José province
- San Pedro de Barva, a village and district in the canton of Barva in the province of Heredia
- San Pedro de Poás, a city and district in the canton of Poás in the province of Alajuela
- San Pedro de Santa Bárbara, a village and district in the canton of Santa Bárbara in the province of Heredia

=== Cuba ===
- San Pedro River (Cuba), a river in Camagüey Province

=== Dominican Republic ===
- San Pedro de Macorís Province, a province of the Dominican Republic, also the name of its capital city
  - San Pedro de Macorís, capital of that province

=== Guatemala ===
- San Pedro Carchá (Alta Verapaz)
- San Pedro Ayampuc (Guatemala dept.)
- San Pedro Sacatepéquez, Guatemala (Guatemala dept.)
- San Pedro Necta (Huehuetenango)
- San Pedro Pinula (Jalapa)
- San Pedro Jocopilas (Quiché)
- San Pedro La Laguna (Sololá)
- Volcán San Pedro

=== Honduras ===
- San Pedro de Copán (Copán)
- San Pedro Sula (Cortés)
- San Pedro de Tutule (La Paz)
- San Pedro Zacapa (Santa Bárbara)
- A prison in Honduras

=== Ivory Coast ===
- San-Pédro, Ivory Coast
- San-Pédro Department

=== Mexico ===
- San Pedro, Baja California Sur
- San Pedro, Coahuila, a municipality
- San Pedro Cholula (municipality), a municipality in the state of Puebla
- San Pedro Garza García, in Nuevo León
- San Pedro, Oaxaca (disambiguation), several places
- San Pedro de la Cueva, in Sonora
- San Pedro Ocotlán, in Zacatecas
- Cerro de San Pedro, San Luis Potosí

=== Nicaragua ===
- San Pedro de Lóvago

=== Paraguay ===
- San Pedro Department, Paraguay, a department of Paraguay. The capital is the city of San Pedro de Ycuamandyyú
- San Pedro de Ycuamandyyú, the capital of that department
- San Pedro del Paraná

=== Peru ===
- San Pedro de Lloc, city in La Libertad Region
- San Pedro de Tacna, capital of Tacna Region

=== Philippines ===
- San Pedro, a barangay of the municipality of Angono in the Rizal province
- San Pedro, Laguna, a city in Laguna, Philippines
- San Pedro, Bagabag, a barangay in Nueva Vizcaya, Philippines
- San Pedro Cathedral, a Roman Catholic Church in Davao City, Philippines
- San Pedro College, a private college in Davao City, Philippines
- San Pedro Cutud, a barangay in San Fernando, Pampanga, Philippines
- San Pedro Bay (Philippines), at the northwest end of Leyte Gulf
- Fort San Pedro, a historic structure in Cebu, Philippines
- Fort San Pedro (Iloilo), in Iloilo, Philippines

=== Spain ===
- San Pedro, Spain (disambiguation)

=== United States ===
- San Pedro, Los Angeles, home to the Port of Los Angeles, located in San Pedro Bay
- San Pedro, New Mexico, a former village across the Rio Grande from San Antonio, New Mexico
- San Pedro Bay (California), an inlet on the Pacific Ocean coast of southern California, United States
- San Pedro Bay (Florida), a wetland and geomorphological province
- San Pedro or Nacimiento Mountains, New Mexico
- San Pedro River (Arizona), a northward-flowing stream originating about 10 miles (16 km) south of Sierra Vista, Arizona, near Cananea, Sonora, Mexico
- San Pedro Valley (Arizona)

== Other uses ==
- Iglesia de San Pedro Mártir (Calatayud), a former church in Calatayud, Aragon, Spain
- San Pedro (ship), a shipwreck off Bermuda
- San Pedro cactus (Echinopsis pachanoi), native to South America
- The San Pedro, a ship that was intentionally sunk off of Honolulu, Hawaii by the Atlantis Submarine Company for an artificial reef; the wreck lies alongside the YO-257
- "San Pedro", a song from Mogwai's 2011 album Hardcore Will Never Die, But You Will
- San Pedro, a fictional island mentioned in Madonna's 1986 song "La Isla Bonita"
- San Pedro, a fictional Central American country which features in the Sherlock Holmes story "The Adventure of Wisteria Lodge"

== See also ==
- San Pedro Bay (disambiguation)
- San Pedro Island (disambiguation)
- San Pedro River (disambiguation)
- Sampedro, a surname
