= Los Teques =

- City
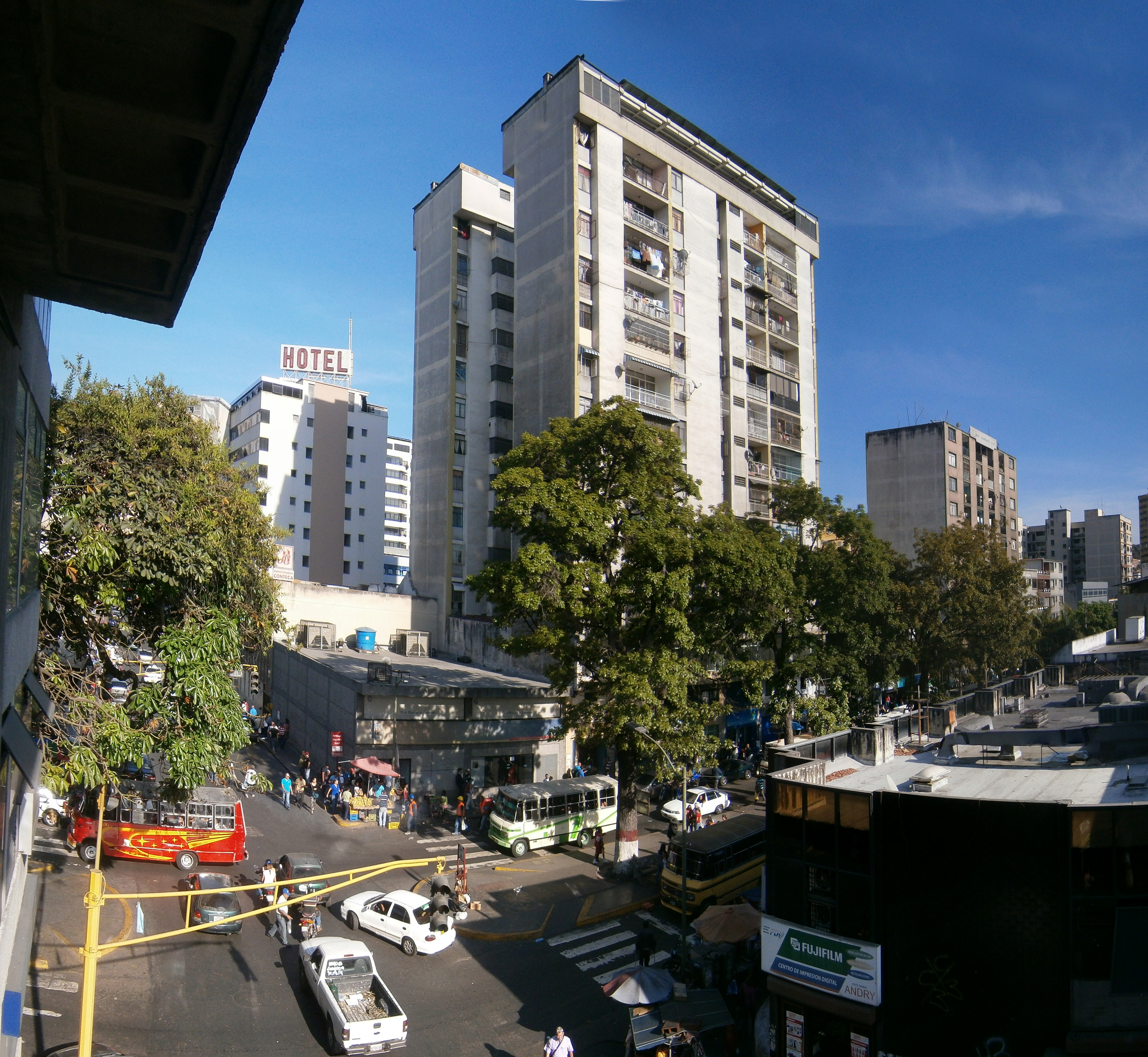
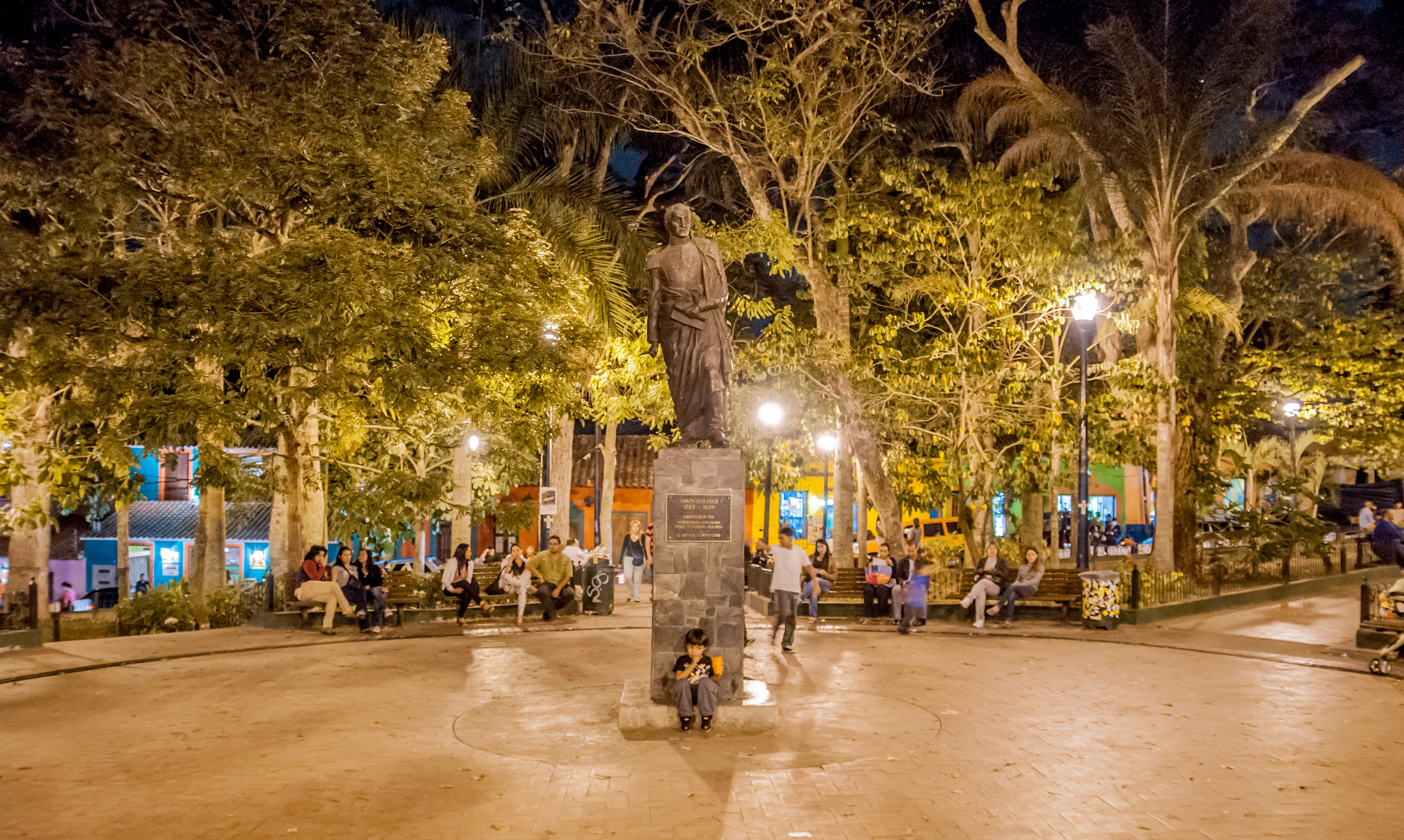
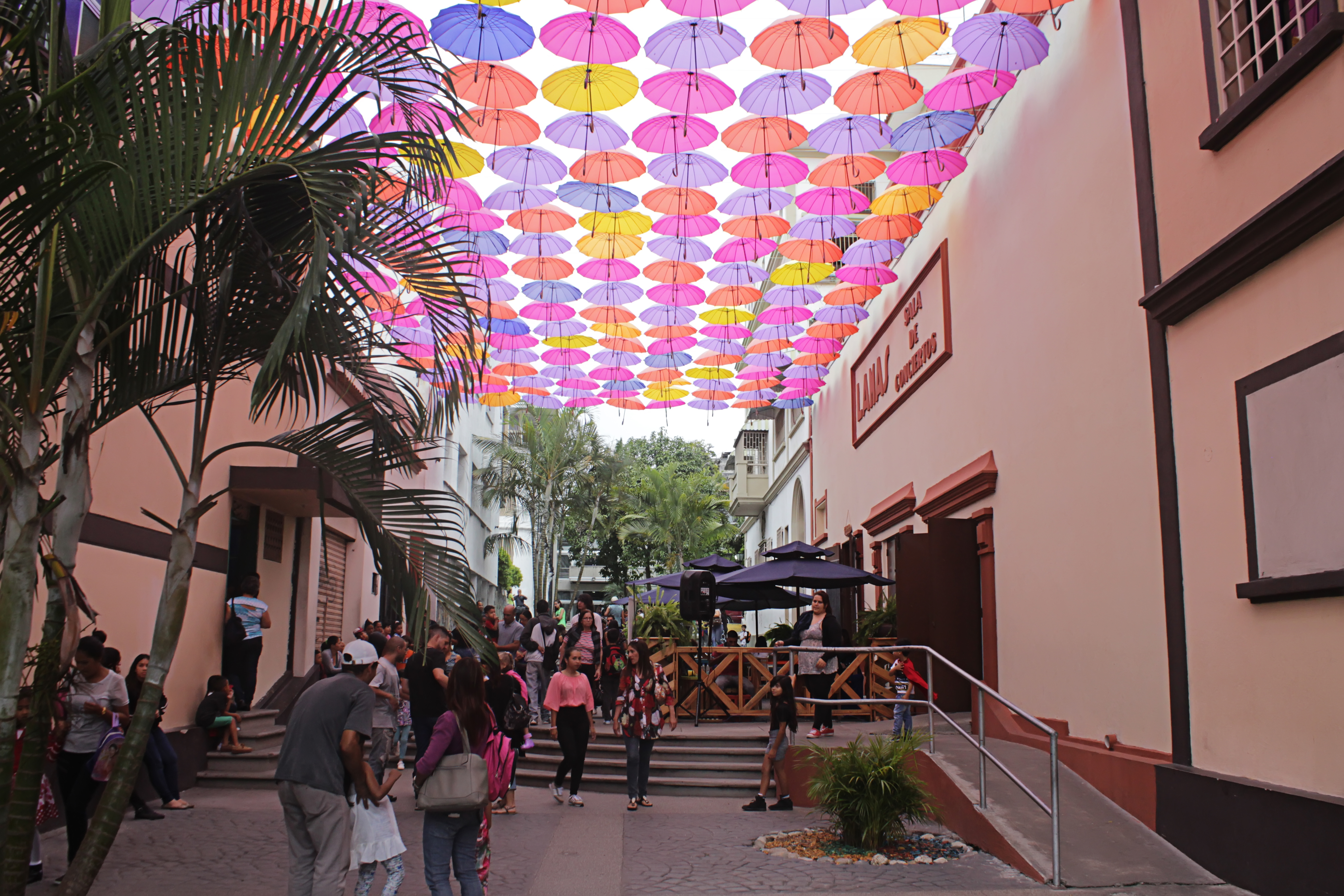
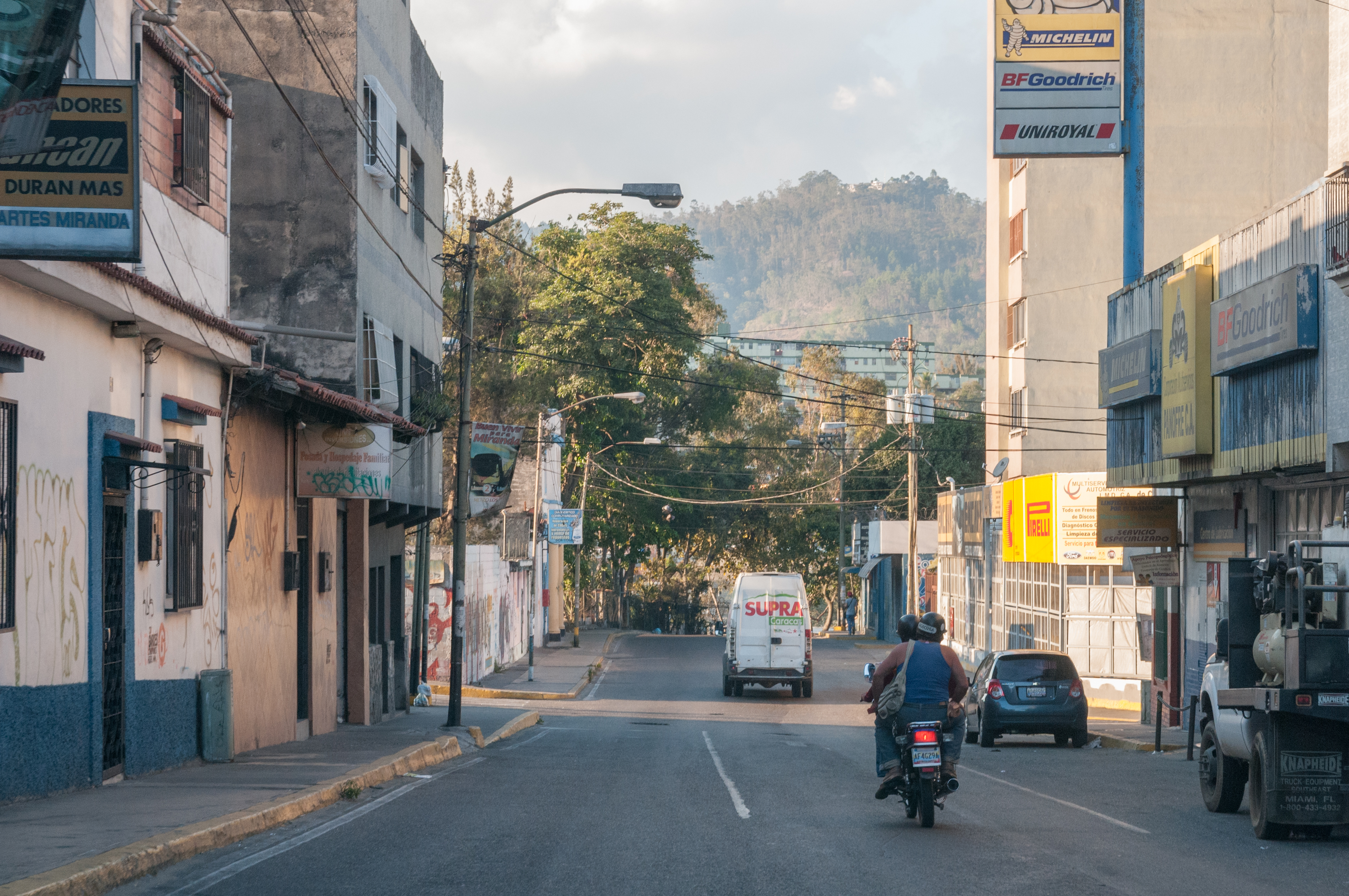
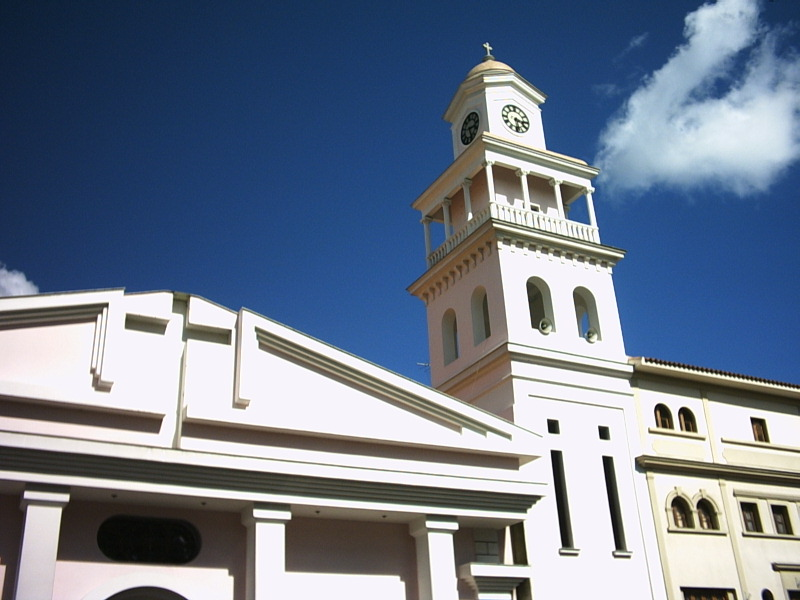
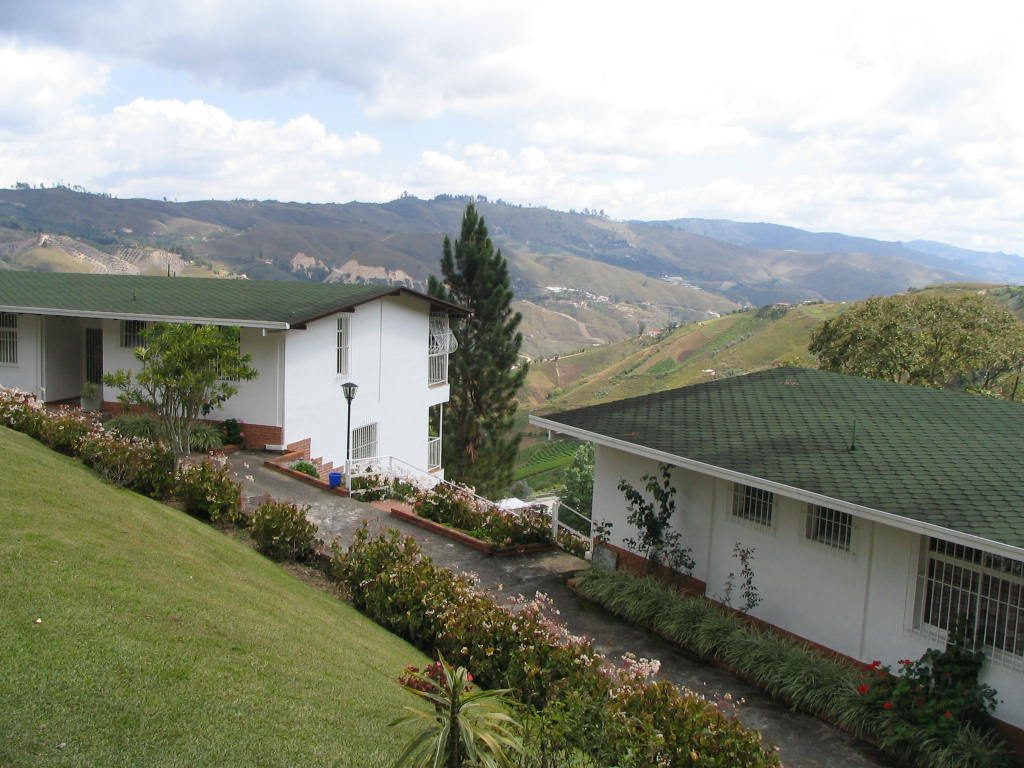
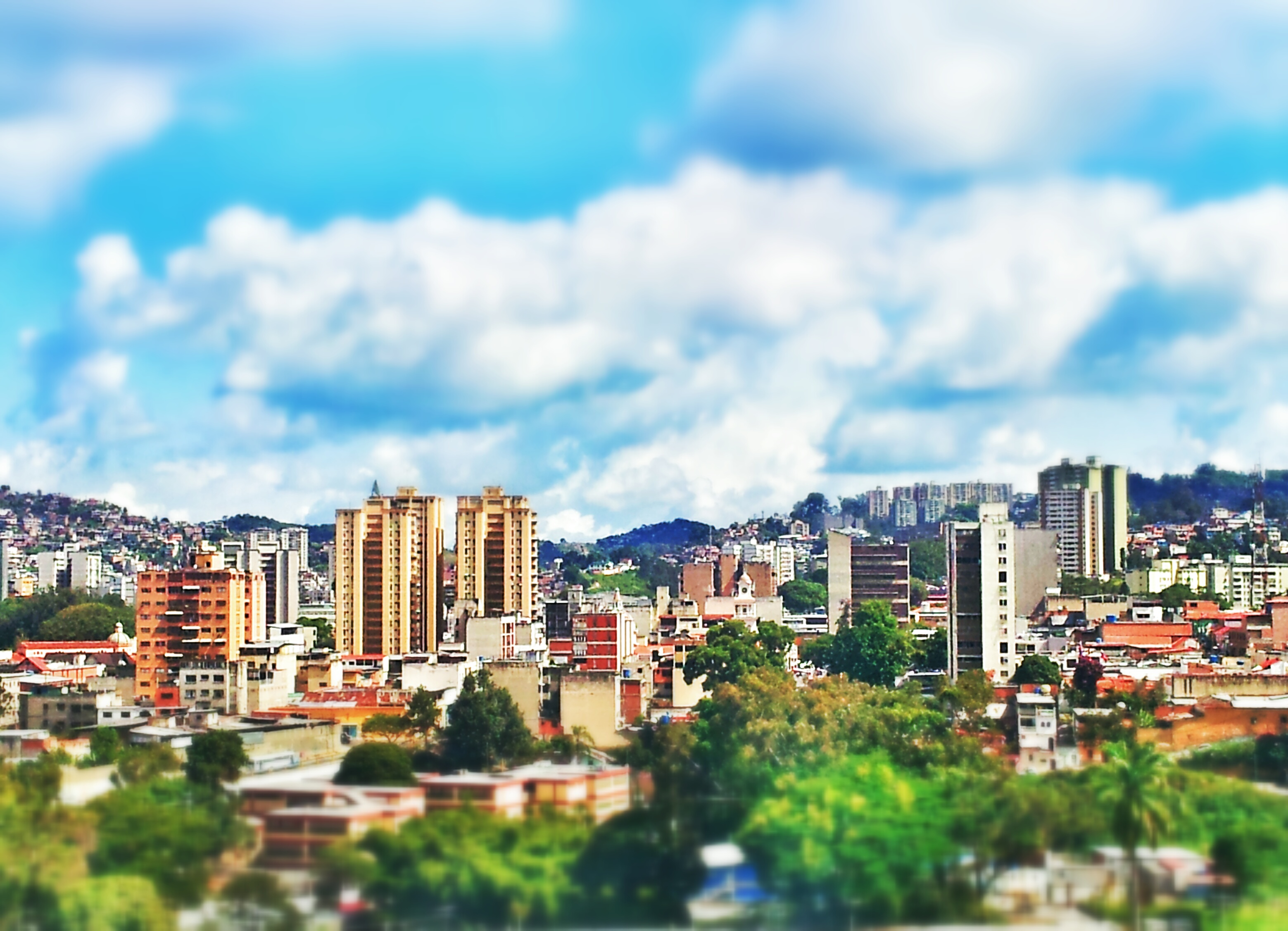
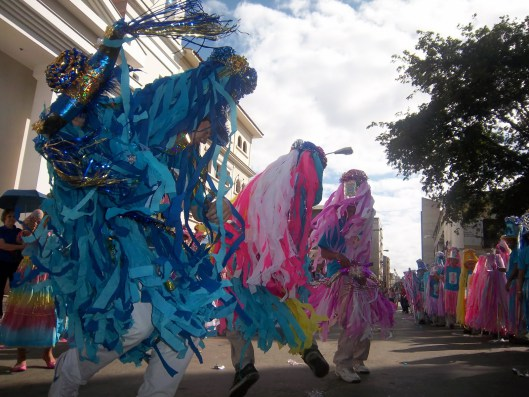
- Los Teques Buildings, Bolívar Square, Paseo Lamas, Street in Los Teques, Los Teques Cathedral, Pozo de Rosas, Central hull and Shepherds of the Child Jesus of the Teques

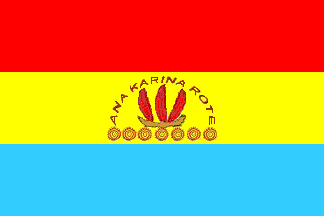
- Flag

- Location within Venezuela
- Coordinates: 10°20′N 67°02′W
- Country: Venezuela
- State: Miranda
- Municipality: Guaicaipuro
- Founded: 1777

Government
  - Mayor: Farith Fraija Norwood
  - Political party: United Socialist Party of Venezuela

Area
  - Total: 61 km^{2} (24 sq mi)

Population (2020)
  - Total: 252,242
  - Density: 4,100/km^{2} (11,000/sq mi)
- Demonym(s): Tequense, tequeño or Los Altos Mirandinos (colloquialy)
- Time zone: UTC−4 (VET)
- Climate: Cwb
- Website: http://guaicaipuro-miranda.gov.ve/

Los Teques (Spanish pronunciation: [los ˈtekes]) is the capital of the state of Miranda, and the municipality of Guaicaipuro in north-central Venezuela. The city is about 25 km southwest of Caracas, and 1,169 metres (3,835 ft) above mean sea level. It lies in the Cordillera de la Costa, on the banks of the Río San Pedro. According to the European Commission, Los Teques had a population of 159,532 in 2015. The city is part of the agglomeration known as Greater Caracas.

== History ==
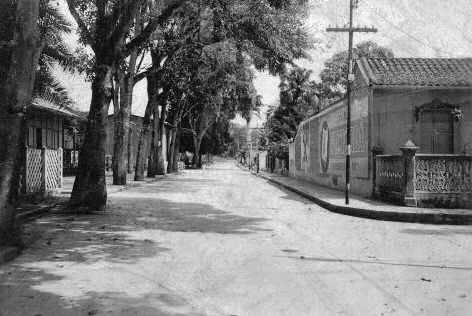
Los Teques in 1940

At the time of the Spanish conquest the region of Los Teques was known for its gold mines, and was the home of Guaicaipuro. Guaicaipuro led the indigenous resistance against the conquistadores until 1568, when he was killed in battle. By 1600, Los Teques was part of the conquered lands (encomienda) belonging first to Francisco Tostado de la Peña and Andrés González, and later by Diego de Miquilena. In 1684 Miquilena sold the "lands of Los Altos" to Doña Melchora Ana Tovar y Bañez, widow of Captain Juan de Ascanio y Guerra.

During the 18th century, the region became more populated, with settlers from the Canary Islands. In 1772, the Spanish inhabitants of San Pedro de Los Altos began to relocate to a new settlement, and on 21 October 1777 this was founded as Los Teques. The new town's name was derived from the Aractoeques Carabs, an indigenous tribe that once inhabited the area.

In 1781 Los Teques had 1,500 inhabitants; Alexander von Humboldt passed by in 1800, calling it "a miserable village", and by 1805 it had 2,800 inhabitants. At the end of 1810, the towns of San Pedro de los Altos and Carizal were legally separated from Los Teques.

In 1854, the Guaicaipuro canton was created, with Los Teques as the head of the canton. By this time, the area had many farms involved in coffee production. In 1891, the municipality was divided into two districts, Los Teques (population 2919) and San Juan. In October 1892, during the Legalist Revolution, Los Colorados, near Los Teques, was the scene of a major battle. Miranda state was created in March 1901; and Los Teques became state capital on February 13, 1927.

The Salesians founded San Jose High School in 1912 and Francisco de Miranda High School in 1940. In 1950, the National Guard Training School was established, and in 1965, Los Teques was elevated to a diocese, whose first bishop was Bishop Juan José Bernal. In 1970, the National Institute of Science and Technology for the Petroleum Industry (INTEVEP) was established on land near Quebrada de la Virgen, and in 1971 the University College of the Capital Region became operational. In October 1979, Ateneo de Los Teques was established.

== Geography ==
The average temperature in Los Teques varies from 18 to 26 °C (64 to 79 °F).

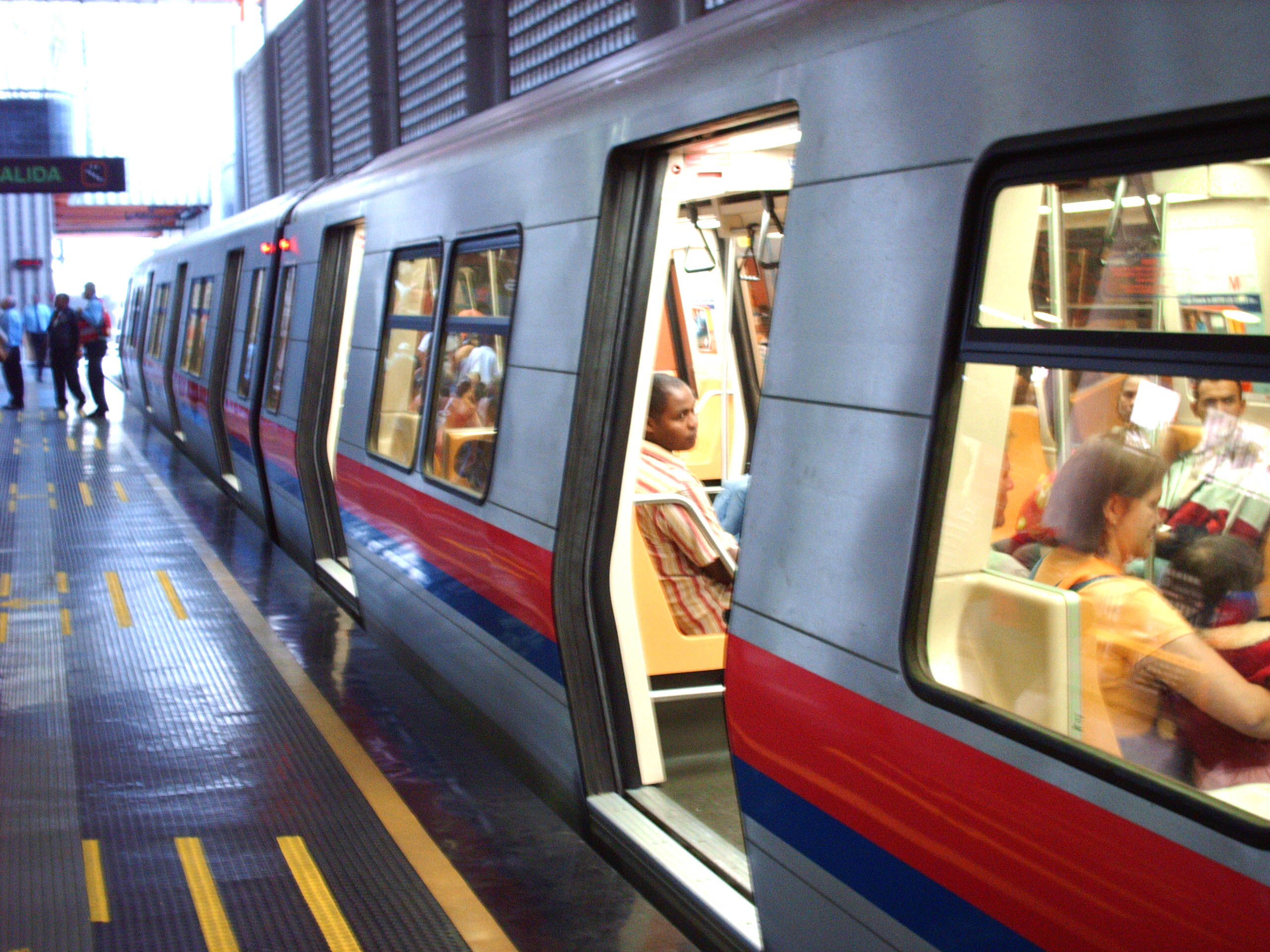
Los Teques Metro

== Transportation ==
On November 3, 2006, President Hugo Chávez inaugurated the Los Teques Metro. This metro system is connected to the Caracas Metro system.

Images of places in Los Teques

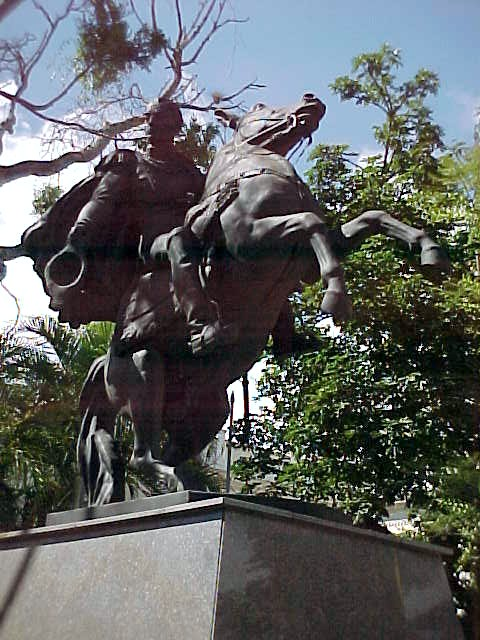
Equestrian statue in the Plaza Bolívar de Los Teques.

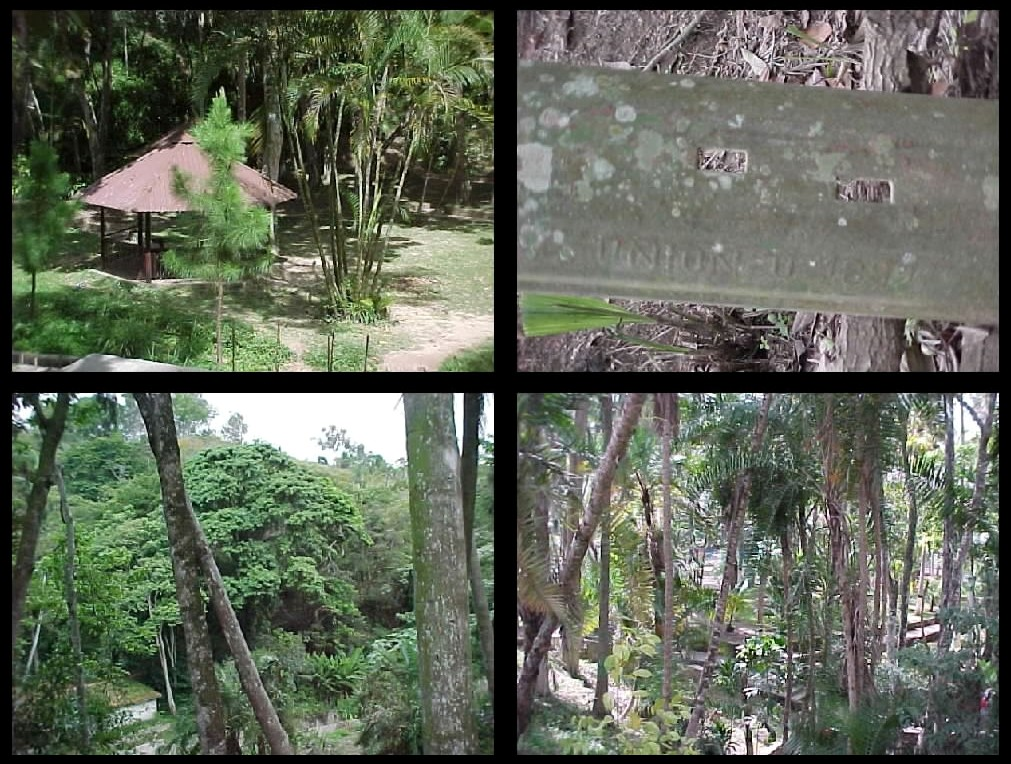
Parque Gustavo Knoop or parque Los coquitos en Los Teques, state Miranda Venezuela

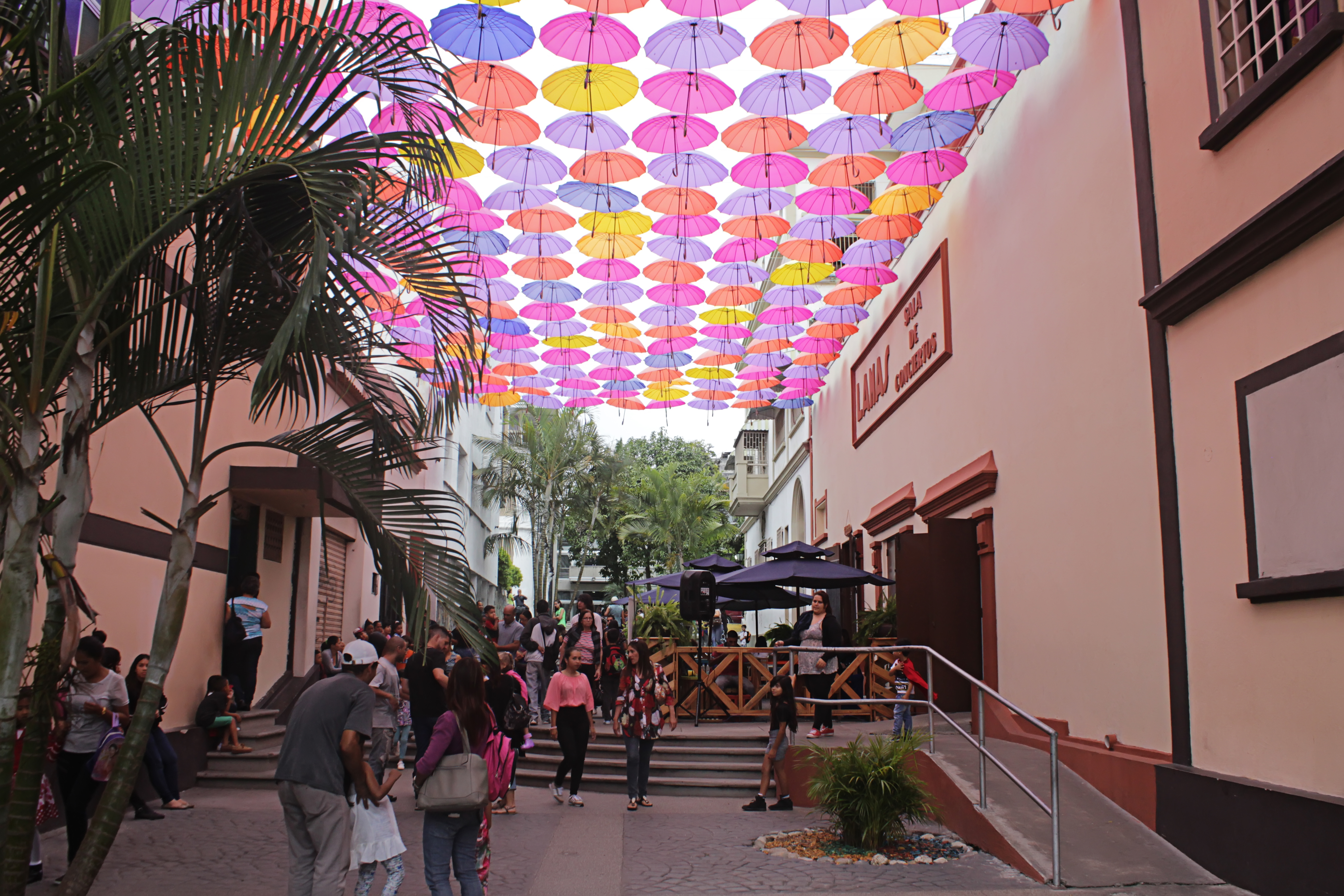
Paseo Lamas de los Teques - Miranda.
