= Guadalete =

River in Spain

Coordinates: 36°45′08″N 05°47′36″W

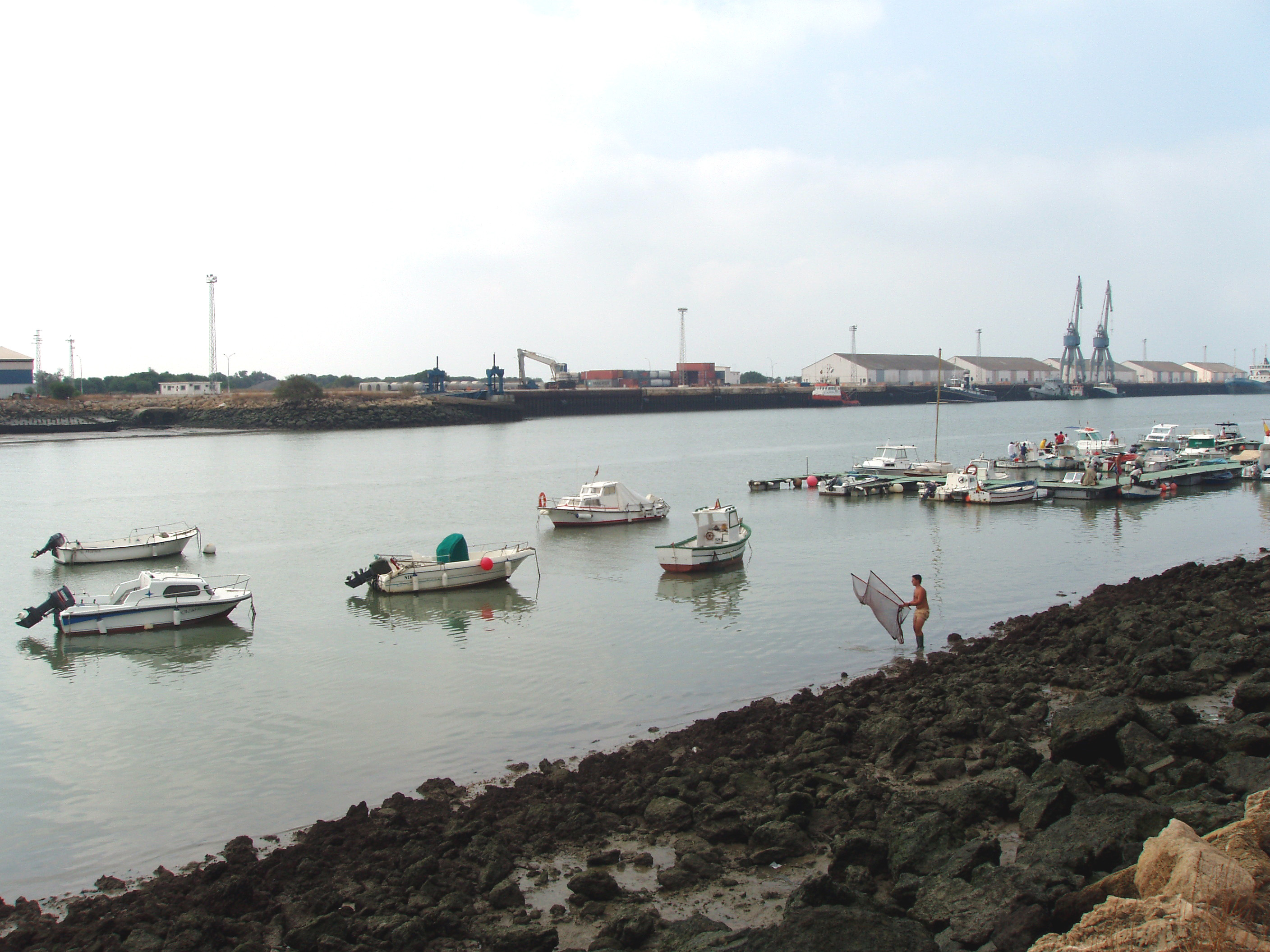
Guadalete River in El Puerto de Santa Maria

The Guadalete (Spanish: [ɡwaðaˈlete]; Arabic: وادي لكة) is a river located almost entirely in the Spanish Province of Cádiz, rising in the Sierra de Grazalema Natural Park at an elevation of about 1,000 metres (3,300 ft), and running for 172 kilometres (107 mi) into the Bay of Cádiz at El Puerto de Santa Maria, north of the city of Cádiz. The river's name comes from the Arabic phrase وادي لكة (Wadi lakath) meaning "River of Forgetfulness".

== Course ==
From its source in the Sierra de Grazalema, the Guadalete passes:

- Grazalema
- The Reservoir (Embalse) of Zahara
- Puerto Serrano
- Briefly enters Seville province and reenters Cádiz province
- Villamartín
- The Reservoir (Embalse) of Bornos
- The Reservoir (Embalse) of Arcos
- Arcos de la Frontera
- La Barca de la Florida
- Lomopardo and El Portal (near Jerez de la Frontera)

It then flows into the Bay of Cádiz in El Puerto de Santa María.

There are several dams with reservoirs along its course, including the Embalse de Zahara and the Embalse de Bornos. The "Sierra Greenway", a 36-kilometre (22 mi) bicycle path reclaimed from an abandoned railroad line, also passes along the river.

The largest tributaries of the Guadalete are the Guadalporcún, and the Majaceite, which joins it at Junta de los Ríos downstream from Arcos de la Frontera.

== History ==
The river may have been the location of the Battle of Guadalete in 711, at which the Visigothic army was defeated by an invading Muslim army, leading to the conquest of Iberia by the Umayyad Caliphate. The river was once the frontier between Christian and Moorish Iberia, receiving the sobriquet Río de los Muertos (river of the dead).

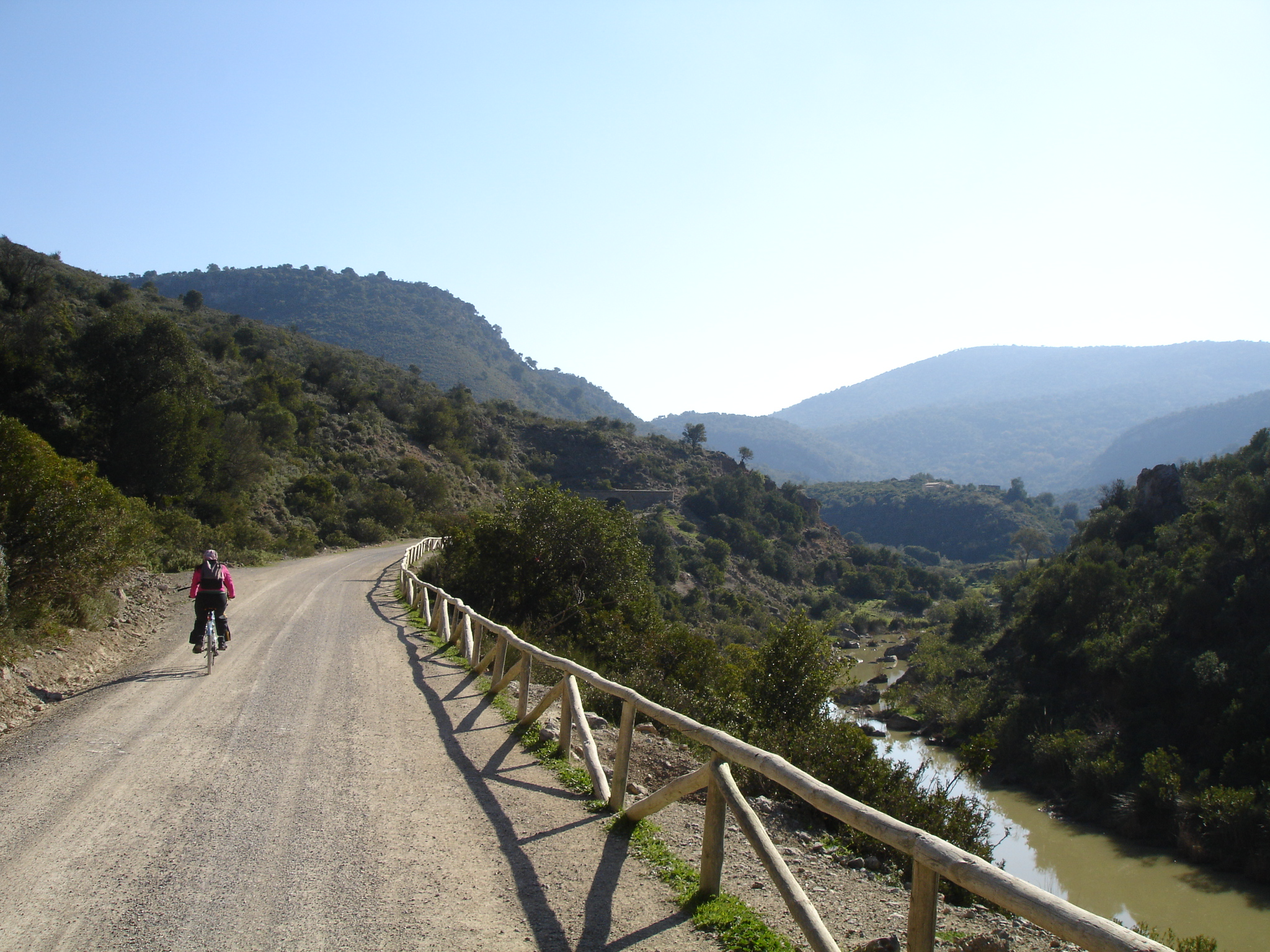
Vía Verde de la Sierra next to Guadalete

== See also ==
- List of rivers of Spain
- San Pedro River, Cádiz
