= San Pedro River =

San Pedro River may refer to:

Alphabetical by country

- San Pedro River (Bolivia)
- San Pedro River (Chile)
- San Pedro de Inacaliri River, Chile, often called simply "San Pedro River"
- San Pedro River (Columbia and Venezuela), a river of the Columbia-Venezuela border
- San Pedro River (Cuba)
- San Pedro River (Guatemala)
- San Pedro River (Chihuahua), Mexico
- San Pedro Mezquital River, Durango and Nayarit, Mexico
- San Pedro River (Philippines), a tributary of Laguna de Bay
- San Pedro River, Cádiz, Spain
- San Pedro River (Arizona), US; originates in Sonora, Mexico
