= San Pedro de los Altos =

- Parish and town
- Location in Venezuela
- Coordinates: 10.367°N 67.086°W
- Country: Venezuela
- State: Miranda
- Municipality: Guaicaipuro

Area
  - Total: 97 km^{2} (37 sq mi)

Population
  - Total: 15,669
  - Density: 160/km^{2} (420/sq mi)
- Time zone: UTC−4 (VET)
- Area code(s): 0212

San Pedro de los Altos or San Pedro, is a town and parish in the municipality of Guaicaipuro, in the state of Miranda, in northern Venezuela, approximately 40 kilometres (25 mi) by road southwest of the Venezuelan capital city of Caracas. It was built by Spanish colonists during the colonial era, along the road connecting Caracas and the west. The parish has a population of 15,669 people, living in an area of 97 square kilometres (37 sq mi).

== Geography ==
San Pedro de los Altos is situated in the northern Venezuela, approximately 40 kilometres (25 mi) by road southwest of the Venezuelan capital of Caracas, and lies in the mountains. The town lies on the banks of the San Pedro River.

== Economy ==
The parish is a producer of vegetables and flowers. San Pedro de los Altos is considered to be an ecotourism hub in the Guaicaipuro area, and attracts hikers through the mountains, who visit the Tácata spas.

== Landmarks ==
The parish contains the Church of San Pedro Apóstol.
