= Guaicaipuro Municipality =

Guaicaipuro Municipality Municipio Guaicaipuro
- Municipality
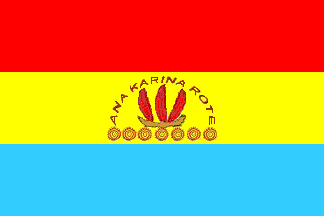
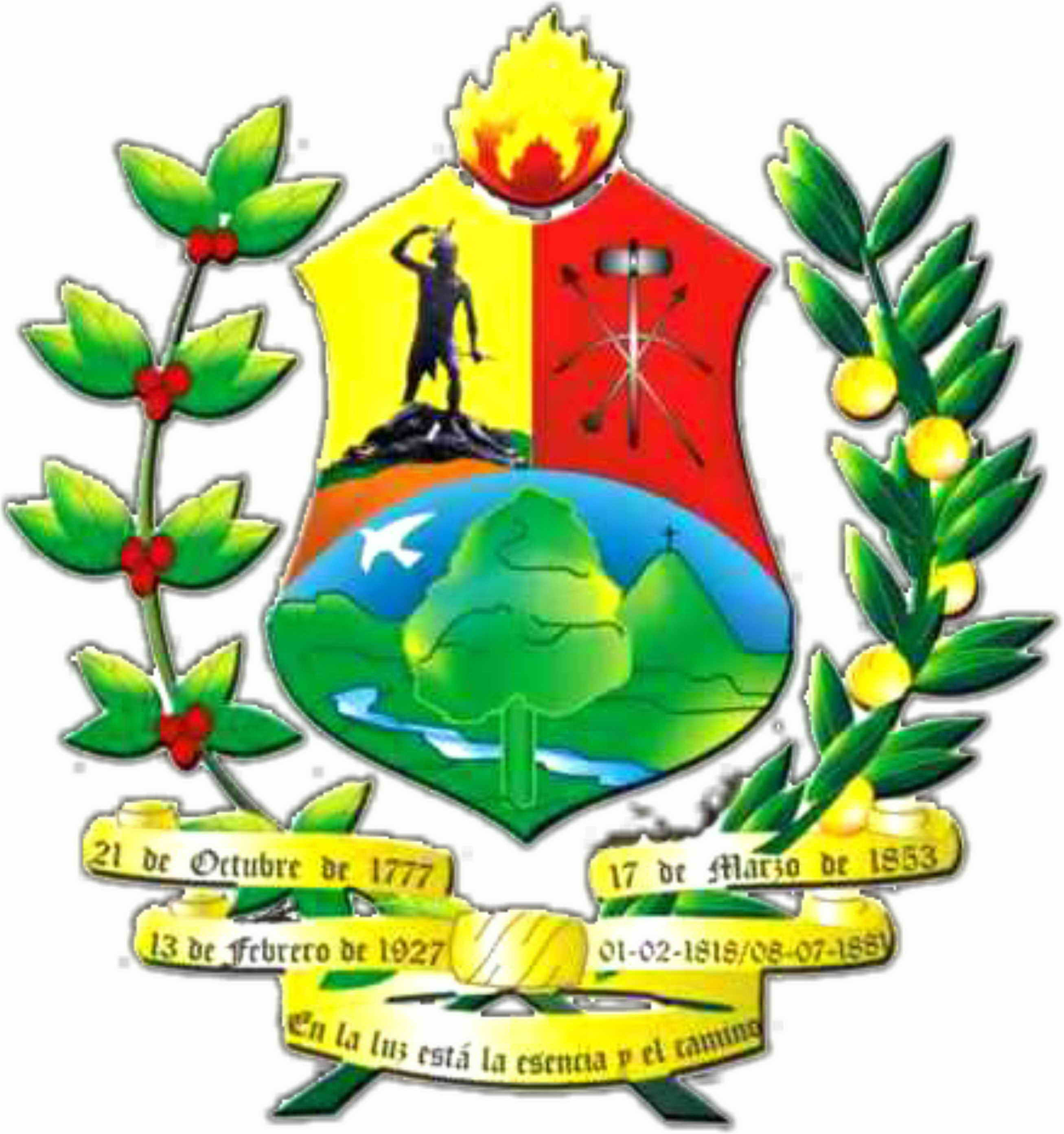
- Flag Coat of arms

- Location in Miranda

- Location in Venezuela
- Coordinates: 10°15′53″N 67°00′50″W
- Country: Venezuela
- State: Miranda
- Municipal seat: Los Teques

Government
  - Mayor: Farith Fraija Norwood (PSUV)

Area
  - Total: 831.8 km^{2} (321.2 sq mi)

Population (2007)
  - Total: 280,687
  - Density: 337.4/km^{2} (874.0/sq mi)
- Time zone: UTC−4 (VET)
- Area code(s): 0212
- Website: Official website

Guaicaipuro is one of the 21 municipalities (municipios) that makes up the Venezuelan state of Miranda and, according to a 2007 population estimate by the National Institute of Statistics of Venezuela, the municipality has a population of 280,687. The town of Los Teques is the municipal seat of the Guaicaipuro Municipality. The municipality is named for the sixteenth century cacique Guaicaipuro.

== History ==
The city of Los Teques was founded in 1777 and was named after the Aractoeques Carabs, an indigenous tribe that once inhabited the area. On February 13, 1927, the capital of Miranda was moved to this city from Petare (before being in Petare, the capital of Miranda was in Ocumare del Tuy).

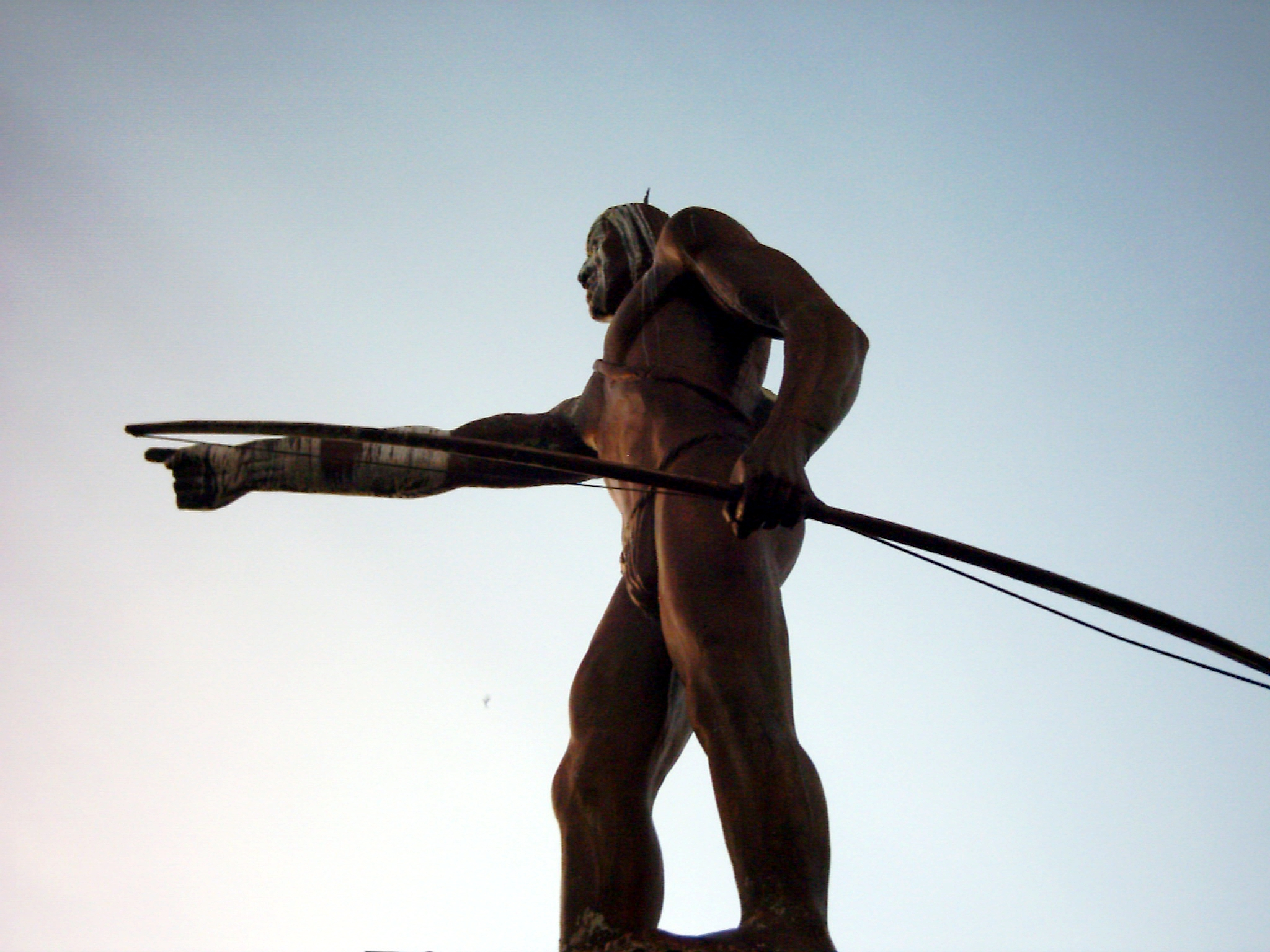
Guaicaipuro memorial in Los Teques

== Geography ==
Temperature: Varies from 18 and 26 degrees Celsius.

The municipality contains 7 parishes:

- Altagracia de la Montaña
- Cecilio Acosta
- El Jarillo
- Los Teques
- Paracotos
- San Pedro
- Tácata

== Demographics ==
The Guaicaipuro Municipality, according to a 2007 population estimate by the National Institute of Statistics of Venezuela, has a population of 280,687 (up from 240,731 in 2000). This amounts to 9.8% of the state's population. The municipality's population density is 424.64 inhabitants per square kilometre (1,099.8/sq mi).

== Government ==
The mayor of the Guaicaipuro Municipality is Francisco Garcés, elected on December 8, 2013, with 52% of the vote. The municipality is divided into seven parishes; Los Teques, Altagracia de La Montaña, Cecilio Acosta, El Jarillo, Paracotos, San Pedro, and Tácata.

== Transportation ==
On November 3, 2006, President Hugo Chávez inaugurated the Los Teques Metro. This metro system is connected to the Caracas Metro.
