= Pozo Amargo (Cádiz) =

Coordinates: 37.0184°N 5.4277°W

Pozo Amargo is a hamlet with 2 inhabitants (INE 2023), that belongs to the municipality of Puerto Serrano, situated in the province of Cádiz, Spain. Pozo Amargo is almost completely surrounded by the province of Seville, with only a small jut of land keeping it connected to Cádiz, Spain. It is located on the bank of the river Guadaira. The name in Spanish means the Bitter Well.

== History ==
It has been found that Pozo Amargo was populated since the Iron Age, because still it conserves a wall built by the Iberians during that period. It has never been an independent municipality and always has been dependent on Puerto Serrano.
