= San Pedro Island =

San Pedro Island is applied to several islands throughout the world, usually by Spanish explorers in honor of Saint Peter.

- Isla San Pedro, a private island off the southeastern shore of Chiloé Island, Chile
- San Pedro Nolasco Island, in the Gulf of California
- South Georgia Island, called San Pedro Island by the Argentine government
- Hinunangan, Southern Leyte, Philippines

== See also ==
- San Pedro, a fictional island mentioned in Madonna's 1986 song "La Isla Bonita"
- San Pedro (disambiguation)
