= Vía Verde de la Sierra =

Rail trail in Spain

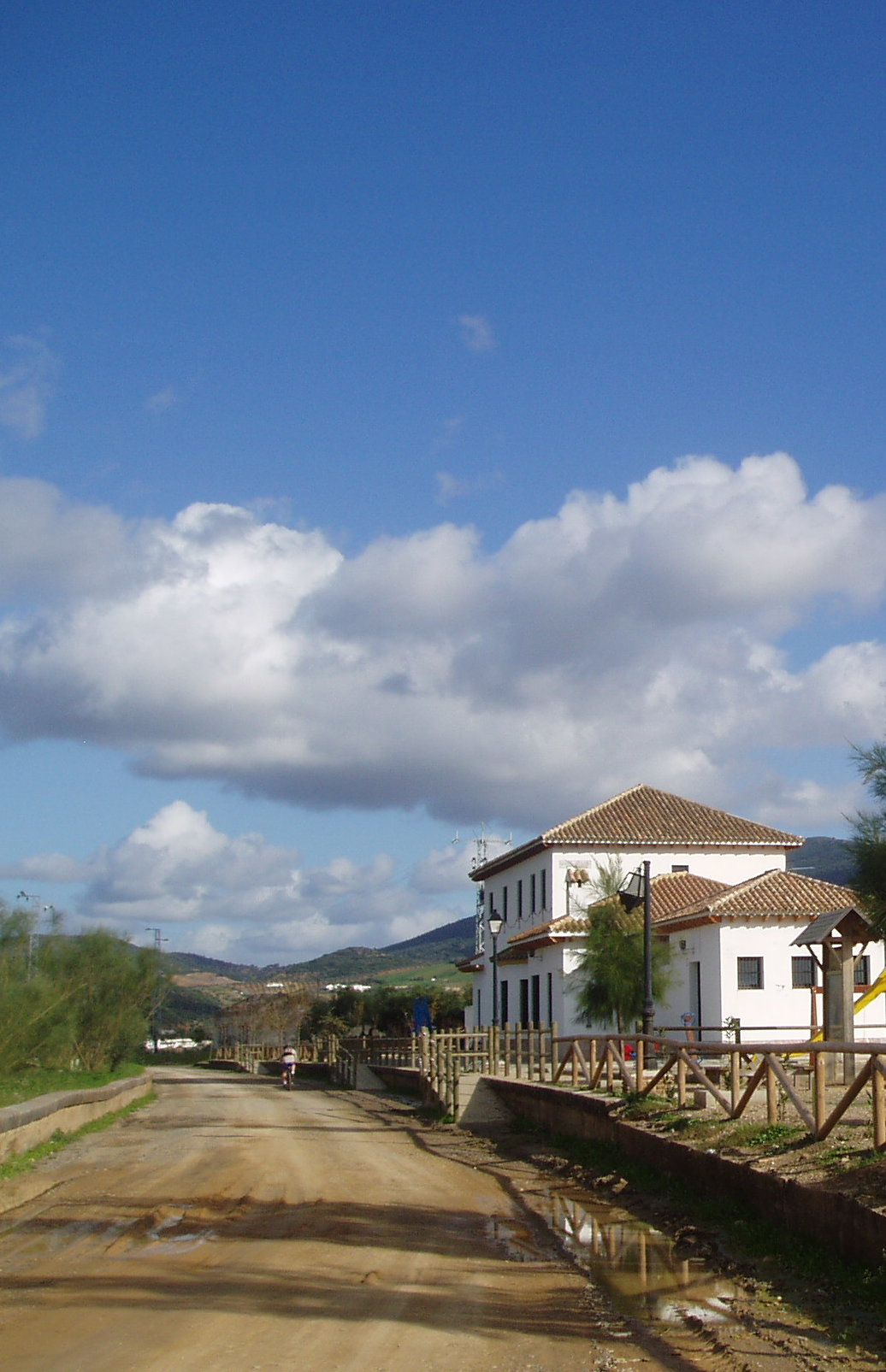
Puerto Serrano station

The Vía Verde de la Sierra is a rail trail for tourist use (hiking, cycling and horse riding) comprising 38 km (24 mi) of mountainous landscape between Puerto Serrano and Olvera villages, provinces of Cádiz and Sevilla. It is part of Vías Verdes of Spain (Spanish national rail trail system).

The path goes along the riverside of Guadalete and Guadalporcún, around the nature reserve of Peñón de Zaframagón (where there is a large colony of griffon vultures) and the natural monument of Chaparro de la Vega.

The route uses a rail track between Jerez de la Frontera (Cádiz) and Almargen (Málaga) through the Cádiz mountains.

== Interesting places ==
Some interesting places near the road are:

- Bird Hide near the natural reserve of Peñón de Zaframagón.
- There is a path to go to the natural monument of Chaparro de la Vega.
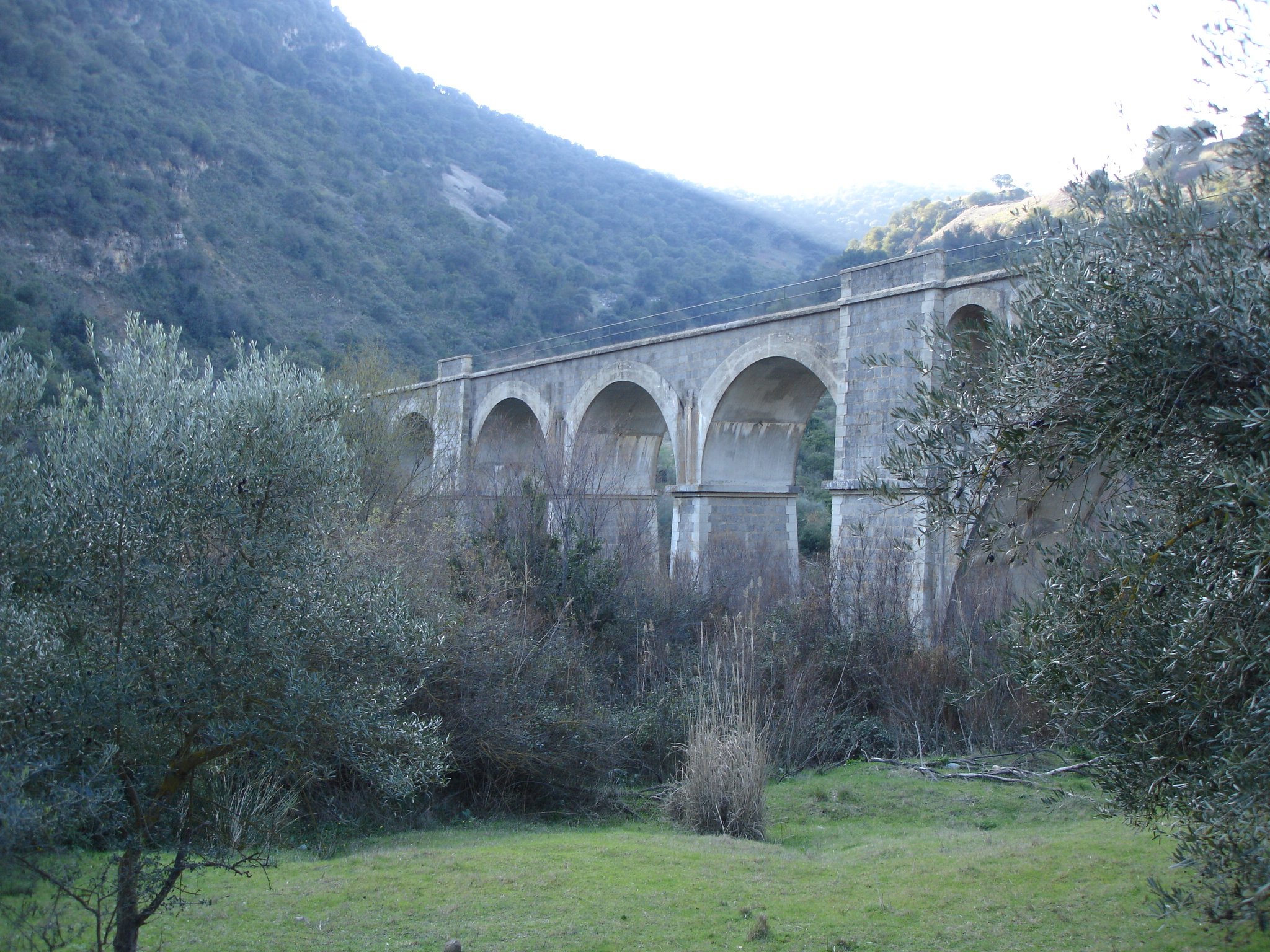
Viaduct over Guadalete river

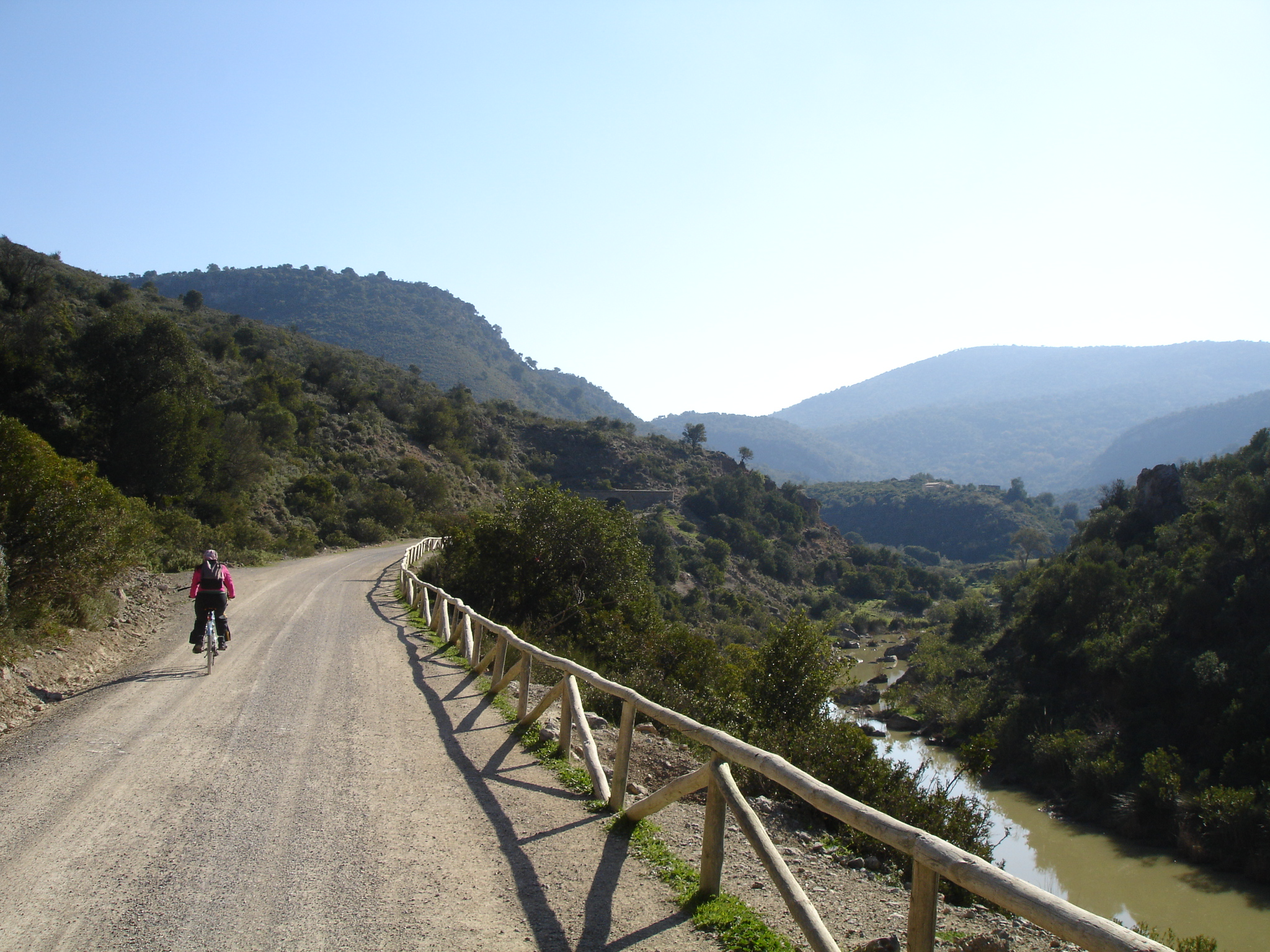
Via Verde de la Sierra, Cádiz (Spain)

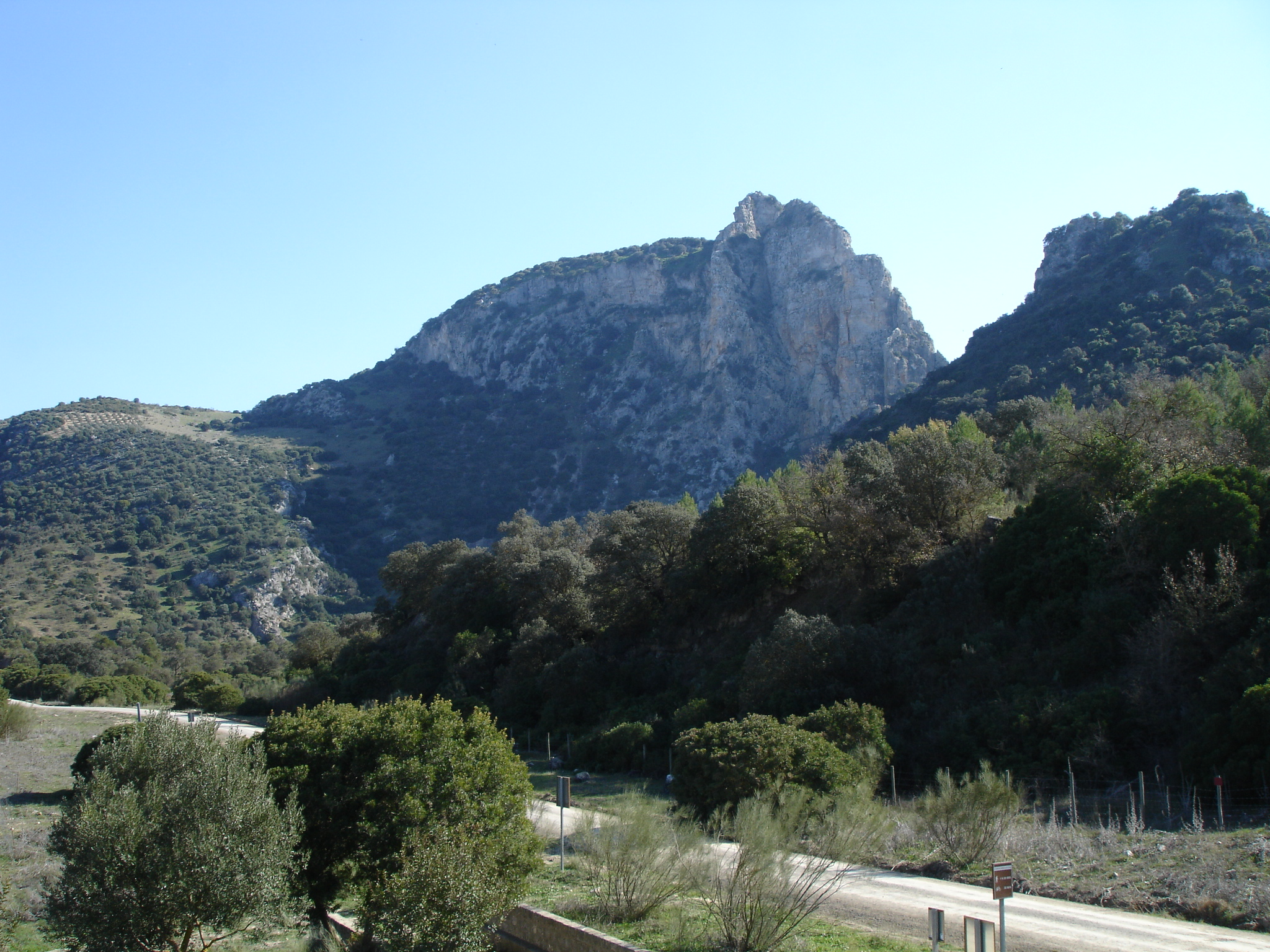
Peñón de Zaframagón

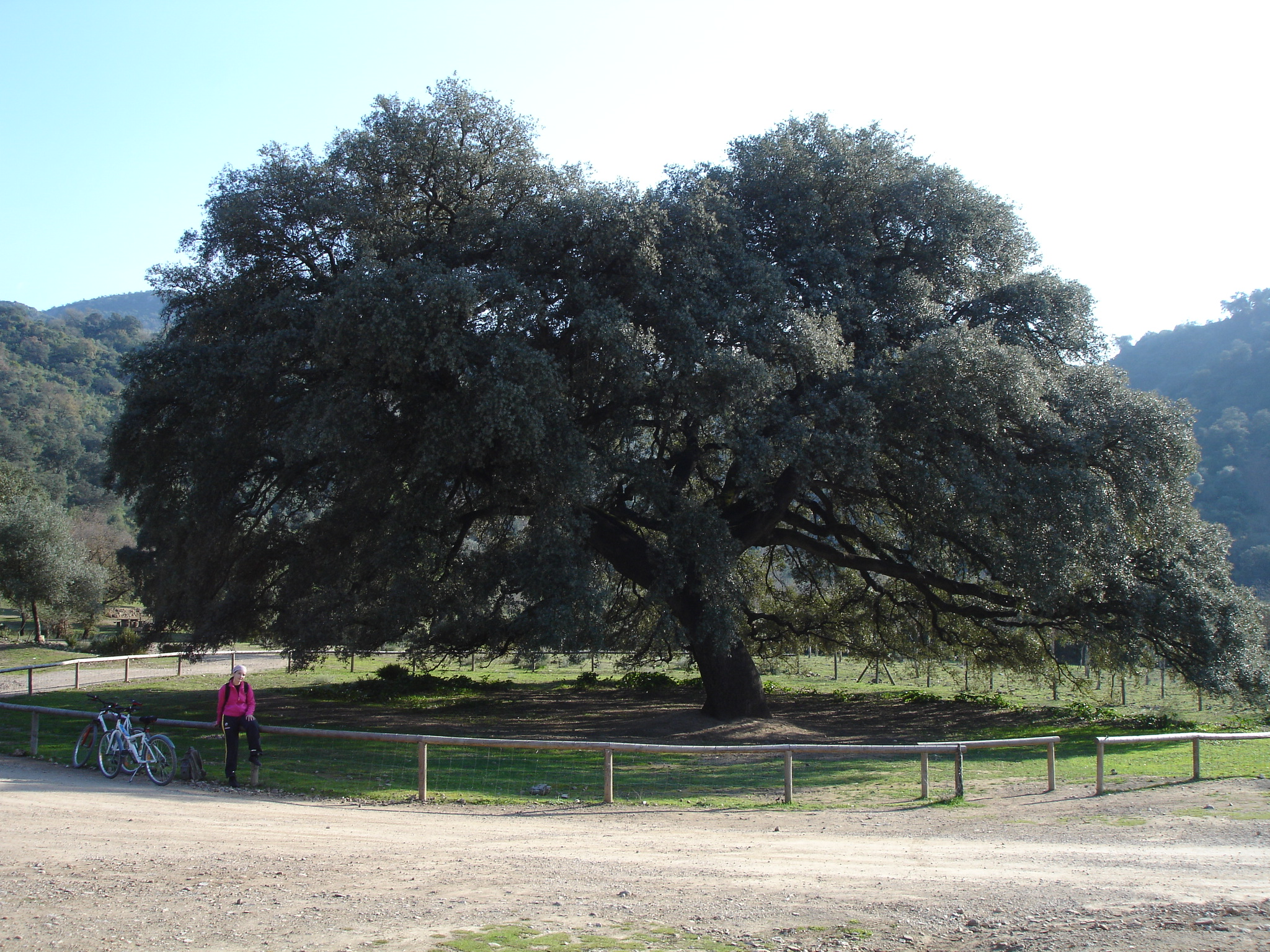
Chaparro de la Vega with a cyclist to compare size
