= San Pedro Palmiches =

- municipality
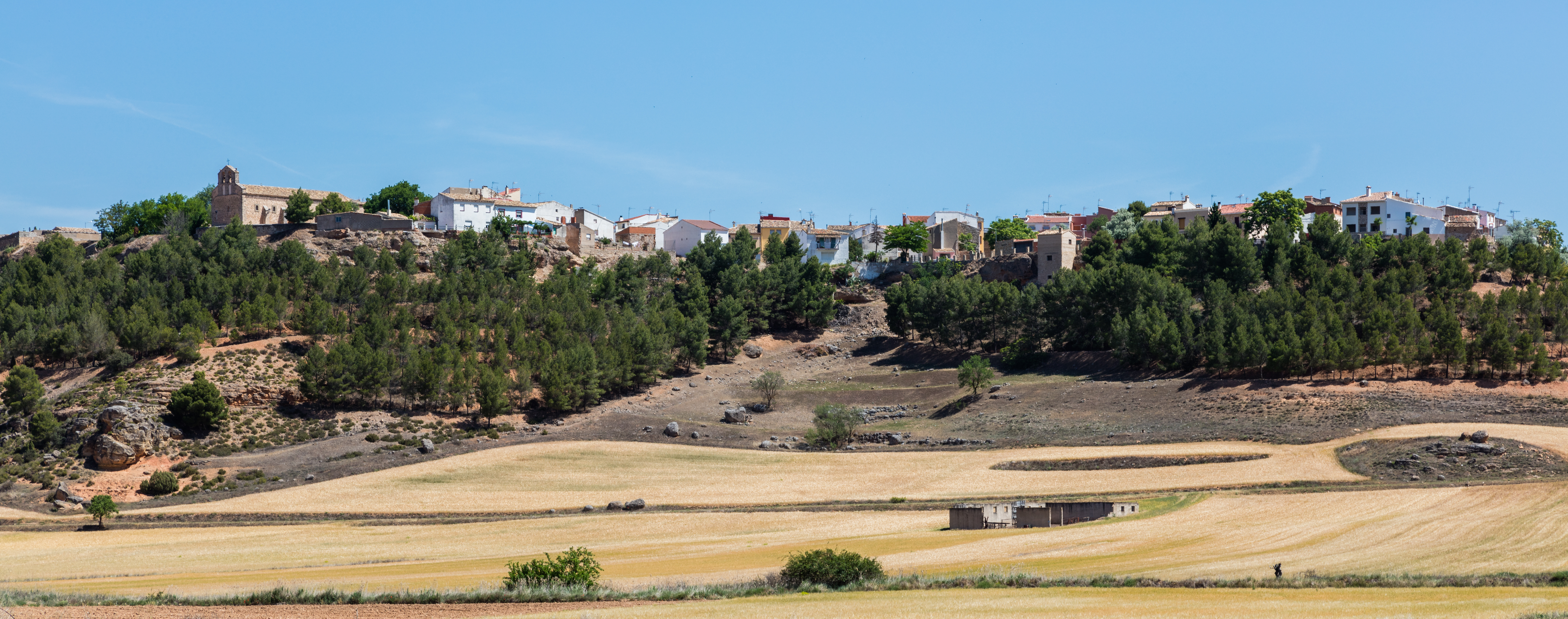
- View of San Pedro Palmiches

- Location within Spain Location within Castilla-La Mancha
- Coordinates: 40°26′N 2°24′W
- Country: Spain
- Autonomous community: Castile-La Mancha
- Province: Cuenca
- Municipality: San Pedro Palmiches

Area
  - Total: 19 km^{2} (7.3 sq mi)

Population (2025-01-01)
  - Total: 54
  - Density: 2.8/km^{2} (7.4/sq mi)
- Time zone: UTC+1 (CET)
  - Summer (DST): UTC+2 (CEST)

San Pedro Palmiches is a municipality located in the province of Cuenca, Castile-La Mancha, Spain. According to the 2004 census (INE), the municipality has a population of 96 inhabitants.
