= San Pedro Bay =

San Pedro Bay may refer to:

- San Pedro Bay (California), an inlet on the Pacific coast of the United States
- San Pedro Bay (Chile), an open bay in Los Lagos Region
- San Pedro Bay (Florida), a geomorphological province of wetlands in north central Florida
- San Pedro Bay (Philippines), a small bay on Leyte
