= Puerto Serrano =

- Flag Coat of arms

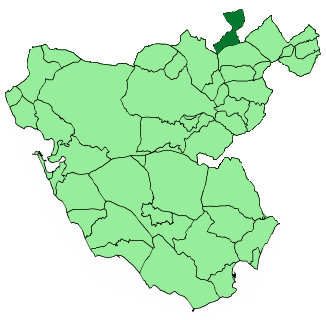
- Location of Puerto Serrano

- Location in the Province of Cádiz Puerto Serrano (Andalusia) Puerto Serrano (Spain)
- Coordinates: 36°56′N 5°33′W
- Country: Spain
- Autonomous community: Andalusia
- Province: Cádiz
- Comarca: Sierra de Cádiz

Government
  - Mayor: Pedro Ruiz Peralta

Area
  - Total: 80 km^{2} (31 sq mi)
  - Land: 80 km^{2} (31 sq mi)
  - Water: 0.00 km^{2} (0 sq mi)

Population (2025-01-01)
  - Total: 6,877
  - Density: 86/km^{2} (220/sq mi)
- Time zone: UTC+1 (CET)
  - Summer (DST): UTC+2 (CEST)
- Website: puertoserrano.es

Puerto Serrano is a municipality in the province of Cádiz, Spain. In 2023 the municipality had a population of 6,921 inhabitants.

== Leisure ==
Puerto Serrano is part of Vía Verde de la Sierra biking and hiking route.

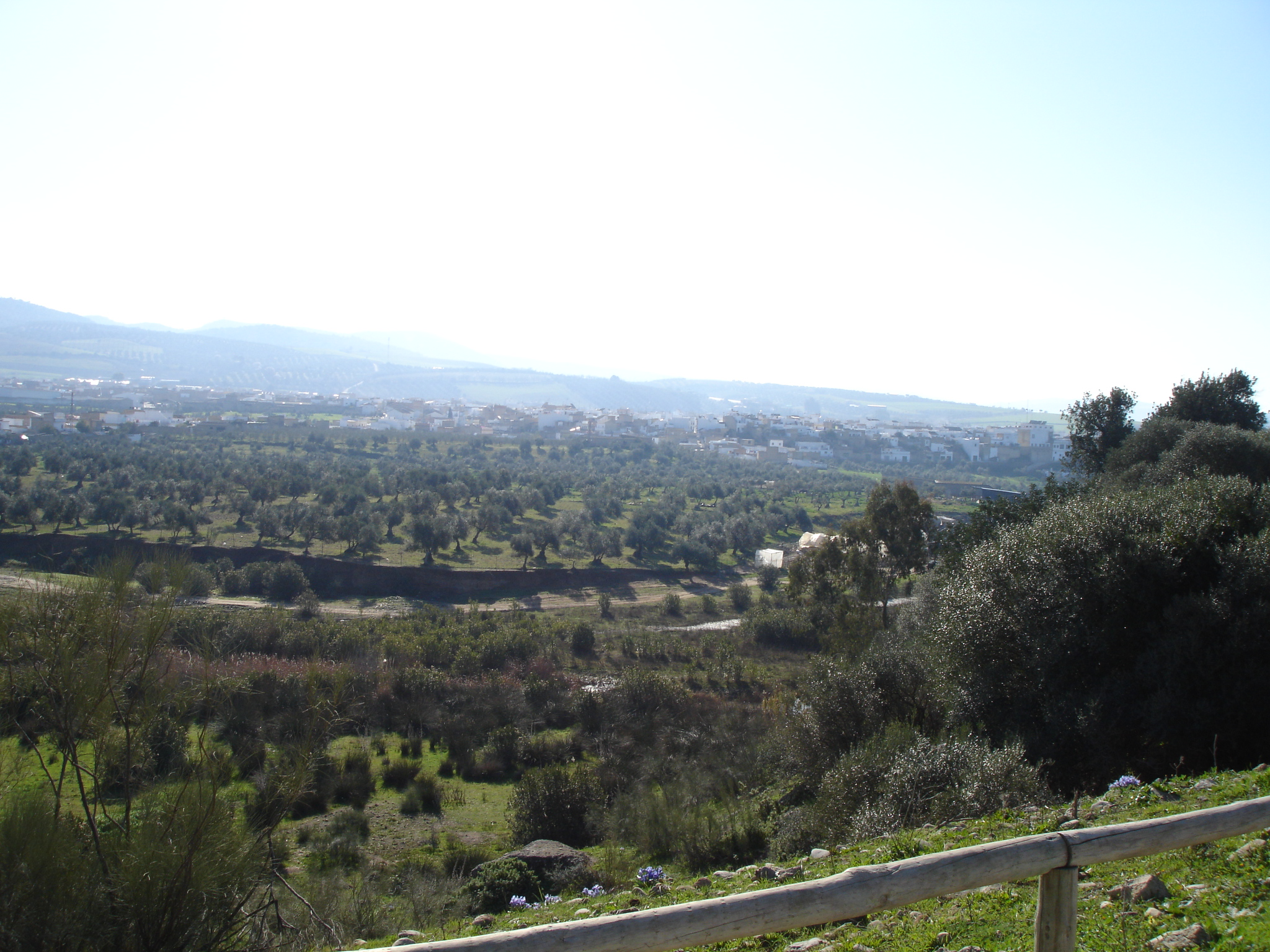
Puerto Serrano

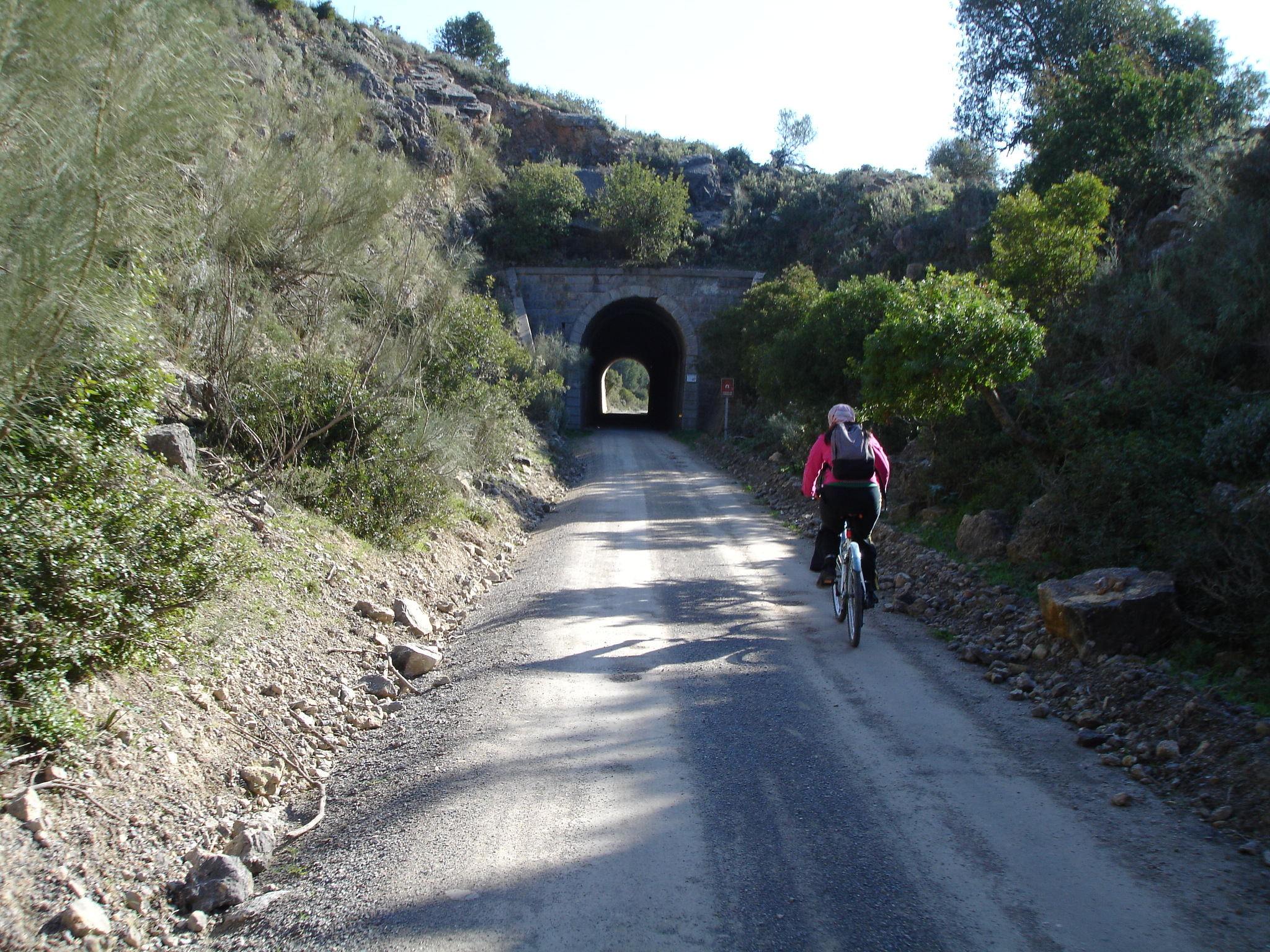
Biking in Vía Verde de la Sierra de Cádiz

== Demographics ==
Historical population
Year	Pop.	±%
1999	6,743	—
2000	6,758	+0.2%
2001	6,789	+0.5%
2002	6,781	−0.1%
2003	6,859	+1.2%
2004	6,828	−0.5%
2005	6,852	+0.4%
Source: INE (Spain)

The hamlet of Pozo Amargo is part of the municipality of Puerto Serrano.

== See also ==
- List of municipalities in Cádiz
