= San Pedro (river) =

River in Spain

Coordinates: 36°32′52.24″N 6°12′32.99″W

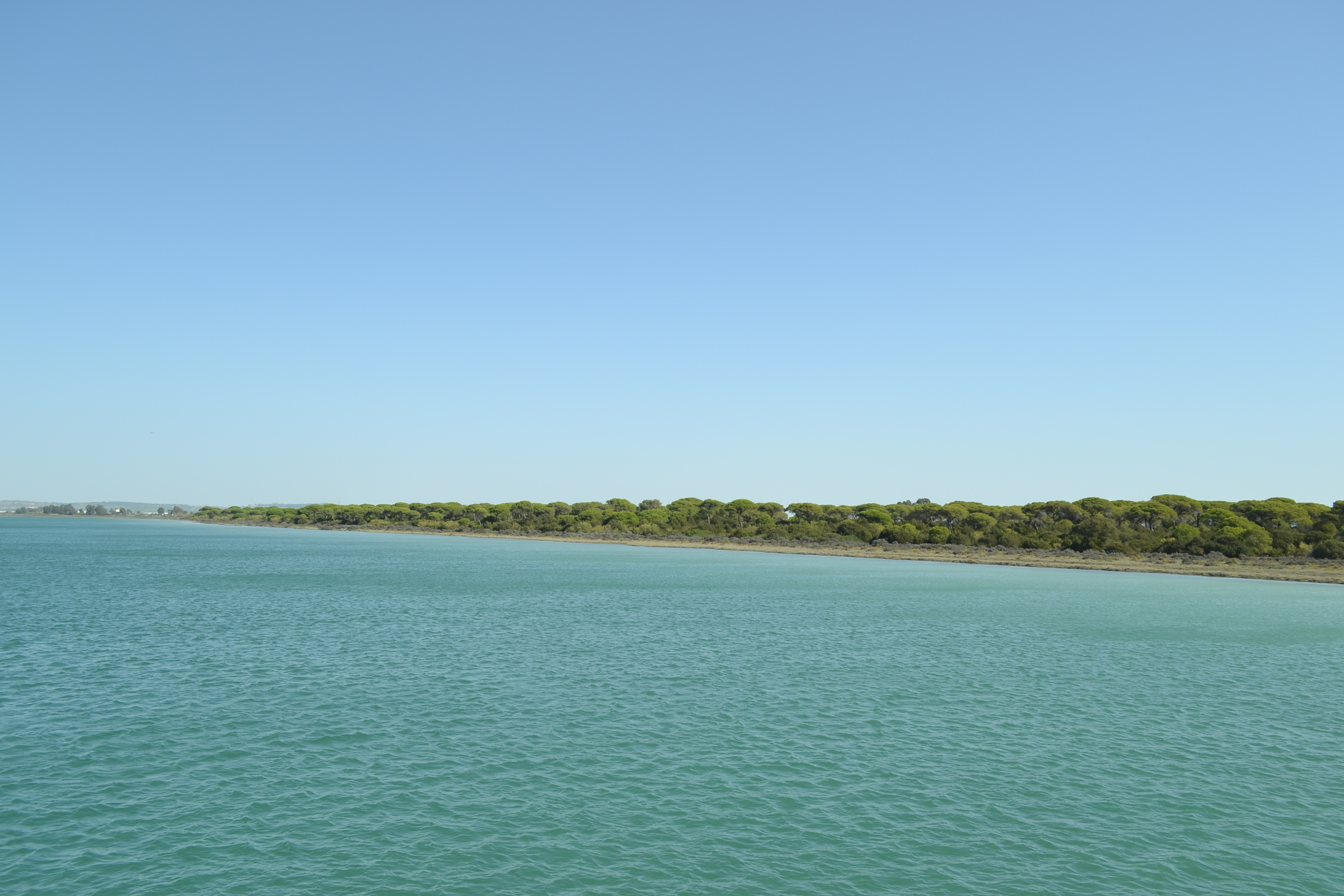
San Pedro River

San Pedro is a small stream in the province of Cádiz, Spain, close to Guadalete river. It runs for 25 km into the Bay of Cádiz. It flows by Bahía de Cádiz Natural Park.

== See also ==
- List of rivers of Spain
