= San Pedro del Arroyo =

- municipality
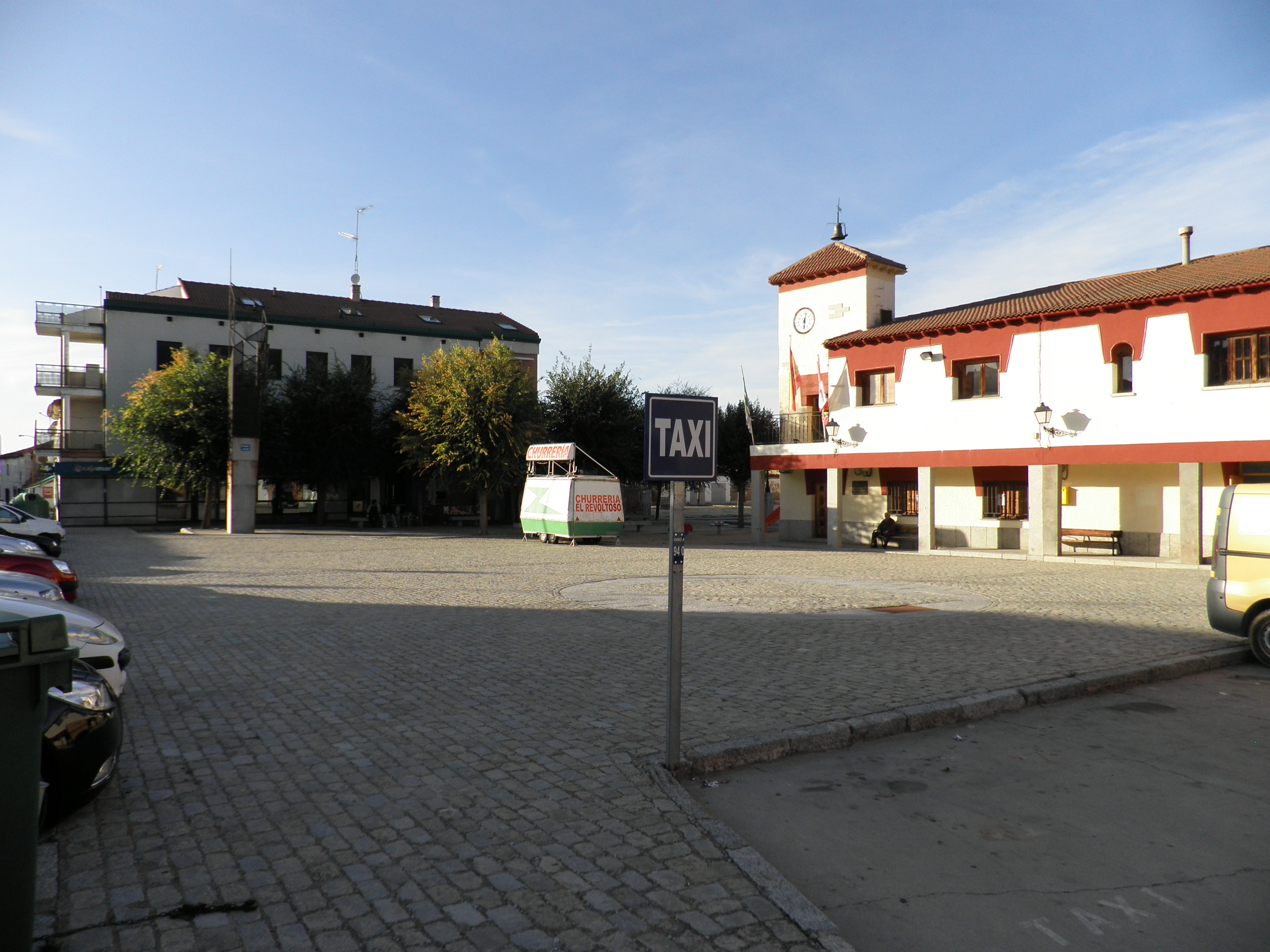

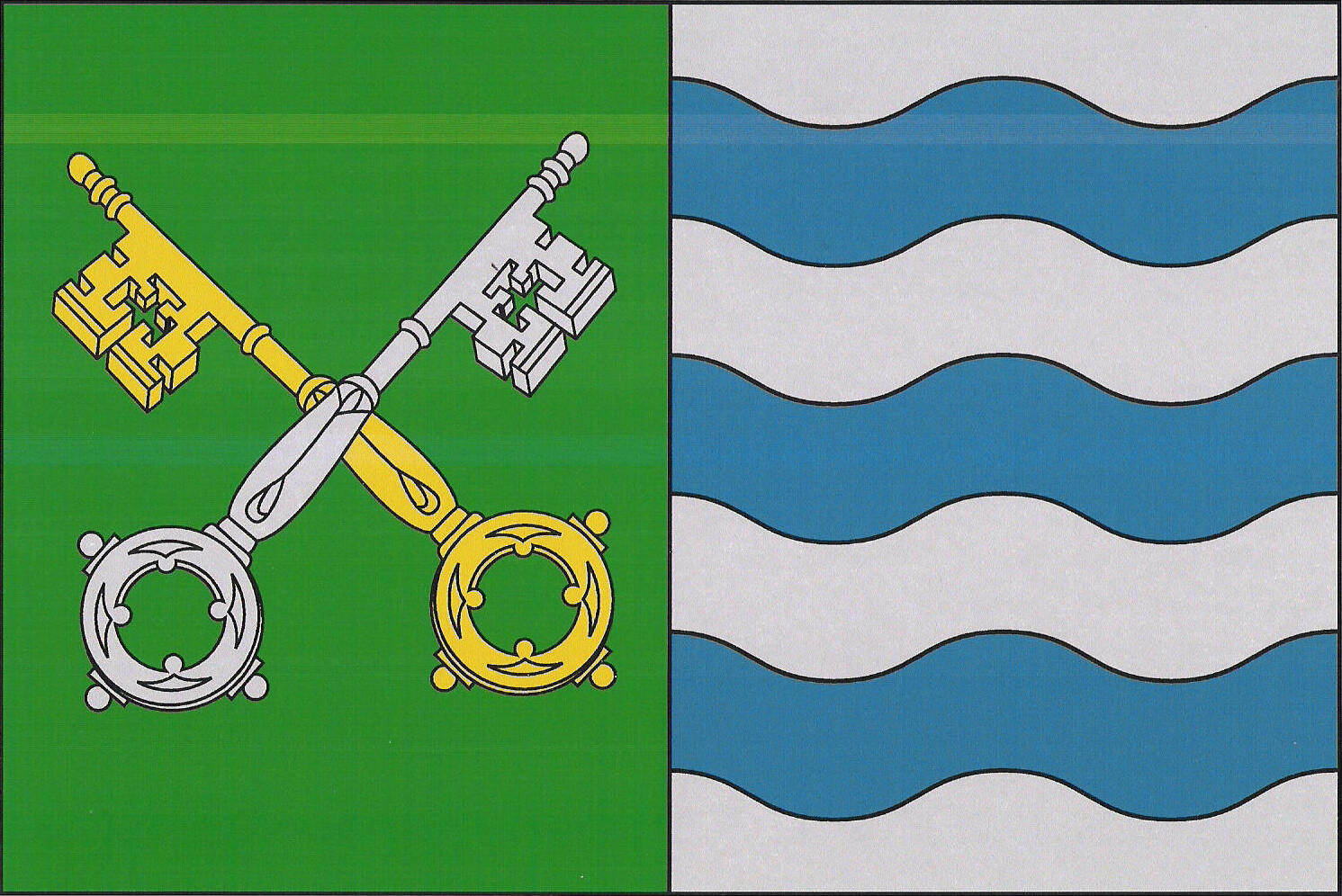
- Flag Coat of arms

- Location in Spain. San Pedro del Arroyo (Spain)
- Coordinates: 40°48′08″N 4°52′15″W
- Country: Spain
- Autonomous community: Castile and León
- Province: Ávila
- Municipality: San Pedro del Arroyo

Area
  - Total: 18 km^{2} (6.9 sq mi)

Population (2025-01-01)
  - Total: 516
  - Density: 29/km^{2} (74/sq mi)
- Time zone: UTC+1 (CET)
  - Summer (DST): UTC+2 (CEST)
- Climate: Csb
- Website: Official website

San Pedro del Arroyo is a municipality located in the province of Ávila, Castile and León, Spain.

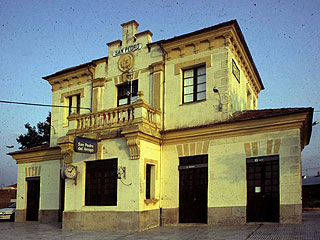
Railway station of San Pedro del Arroyo in Spring 1995.

== Population ==
Historical population
Year	Pop.	±% p.a.
2023	43	—
2024	45	+4.65%
2025	44	−2.22%
Source: INE
