= San Pedro Apóstol Church =

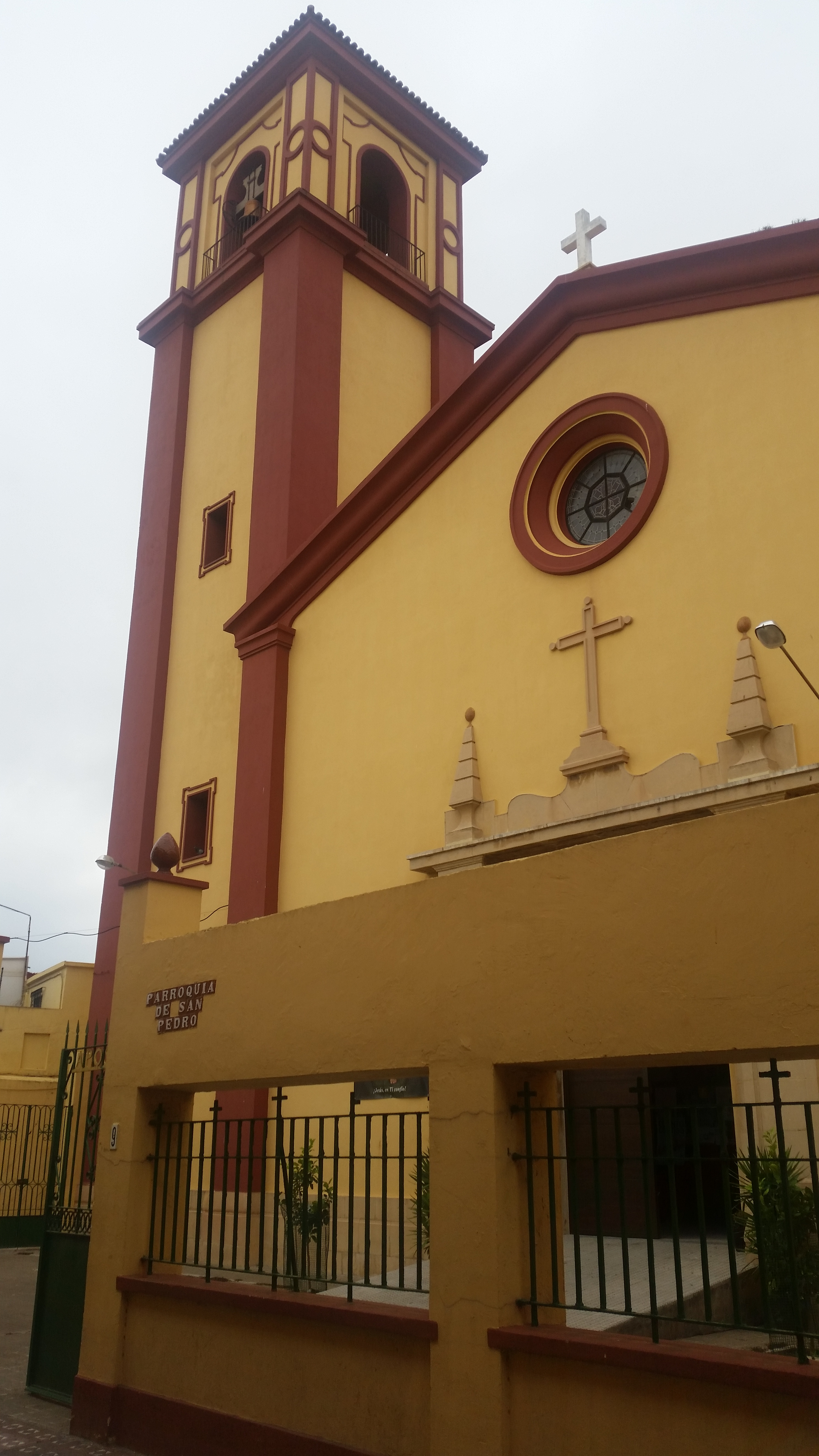
- San Pedro Apóstol Church
- 36°09′59.5″N 5°21′15.8″W
- Location: Calle Siete Revueltas; 11300 La Línea de la Concepción (Cádiz)
- Country: Spain
- Denomination: Roman Catholic

San Pedro Apóstol Church (St Peter the Apostle in English) is a parish church in La Línea de la Concepción, Andalusia, Spain.
