= San Pedro River (Cuba) =

- Location of mouth
- Native name: Río San Pedro (Spanish)

Location
- Country: Cuba

Physical characteristics
- Source
  - location: Camagüey
- Mouth
  - location: Gulf of Ana María (Caribbean Sea)
  - coordinates: 21°8′18.3582″N 78°29′50.283″W
  - elevation: Sea level
- Basin size: 1,053 km^{2} (407 sq mi)

Basin features
- Tributaries
  - left: Río Hatibonico
  - right: Río Tínima, El Bolsillo

San Pedro River (Spanish: Río San Pedro) is a river in the southwest of Camagüey Province, Cuba. Its basin covers an area of 1,053km^{2}. The watershed is polluted due to the discharge of poorly treated liquid waste from the city of Camagüey. Home to Jimaguayú Dam, one of the largest in the country.

The river forms south of the city of Camagüey, at the confluence of Río Tínima and Río Hatibonico. River El Bolsillo joins it just south of the confluence. San Pedro River flows south to Jimaguayú Dam, then west, and empties into the Caribbean Sea about 40km west of town of Vertientes.

== See also ==
- List of rivers of Cuba
