= List of Miss Grand Venezuela titleholders =

The following is a list of Miss Grand Venezuela titleholders from the competition's inaugural edition in 2013 to present.

== Miss Grand Venezuela titleholders ==
One Miss Grand Venezuela winner have gone on to become Miss Grand International, who are indicated in bold face.

Color key

- Declared as winner
- Ended as runner-up
- Ended as top 5/8 qualification
- Ended as one of the finalists or semifinalists
- Ended as special awards winner

† = deceased

Year	State	Titleholder	Birth	Age (Note: Ages at the time of Miss Venezuela)	Hometown	Location	Date	Entrants	Placement (Note: Placements only applied for the Big 7 pageants (Miss World, Miss Universe, Miss International, Miss Earth, Miss Supranational, Miss Grand International and Miss Intercontinental).)
2013	Vargas	Mariana Jiménez	December 1, 1993	18	La Guaira	Universidad Nueva Esparta, Caracas	September 13, 2012	20	Top 10 in Miss Grand International 2013; Top 10 in Miss Universe 2015
2014	Distrito Capital	Alix Sosa	December 3, 1988	25	Caracas	Belankazar Model Agency, Caracas	August 17, 2014	Designated	Top 20 in Miss Grand International 2014
2015	Distrito Capital	Reina Rojas	September 21, 1993	21	Caracas	Teatro Santa Fe, Caracas	July 24, 2015	Designated	Top 20 in Miss Grand International 2015
2016	Mérida	Emmy Carrero^{[β]}	February 24, 1995	20	El Vigía	Macaracuay Plaza, Caracas	November 12, 2015	21	
2016	Táchira	Débora Medina^{[α]}	February 23, 1994	22	Colón	Belankazar Model Agency, Caracas	July 29, 2016	Designated	Top 21 in Miss Grand International 2016
2017	Táchira	Maritza Contreras^{[β]}	August 28, 1995	21	Ureña	Teatro Santa Fe, Caracas	December 15, 2016	10	
2017	Falcón	Tulia Alemán^{[α]}	January 4, 1993	23	Mene de Mauroa	Estudio 1, Venevisión, Caracas	October 5, 2016	24	1st Runner-Up in Miss Grand International 2017
2018	Zulia	Biliannis Álvarez	January 4, 1998	19	Cabimas	Estudio 5, Venevisión, Caracas	November 9, 2017	24	Top 10 in Miss Grand International 2018
**2019**	**Anzoátegui**	**Valentina Figuera**	**June 16, 2000**	**18**	**Puerto La Cruz**	**Teatro Municipal of Caracas, Caracas**	**December 17, 2018**	**22**	**Miss Grand International 2019**
2020	Táchira	Eliana Roa	August 24, 1996	24	Colón		December 31, 2020	Designated	Unplaced in Miss Grand International 2020
2021	Monagas	Vanessa Coello	September 1, 1995	25	Maturín		August 24, 2021	Designated	Top 10 in Miss Grand International 2021
2022	Mérida	Sabrina Deraneck^{[β]}	May 5, 1999	23	Mérida	Teatro Municipal of Caracas, Caracas	August 13, 2022	Designated	
2022	Miranda	Luiseth Materán^{[α]}	July 14, 1996	26	Los Teques		September 3, 2022	Designated	Top 16 in Miss Universe 2021; 3rd Runner-Up in Miss Grand International 2022
2023	Anzoátegui	Valentina Martínez	March 9, 2000	22	Puerto La Cruz	Teatro Municipal of Caracas, Caracas	August 13, 2022	22	Unplaced in Miss Grand International 2023
2024	Distrito Capital	Anna Blanco	December 29, 1999	24	Caracas	Caracas Militar Circle, Caracas	June 28, 2024	Designated	Unplaced in Miss Grand International 2024
2025	Miranda	Tina Batson	May 16, 1999	25	Barcelona	Caracas Militar Circle, Caracas	June 28, 2024	18	TBA

Notes

- **^α** Successor.
- **^β** Resigned.
- **^γ** Dethroned

=== Gallery ===
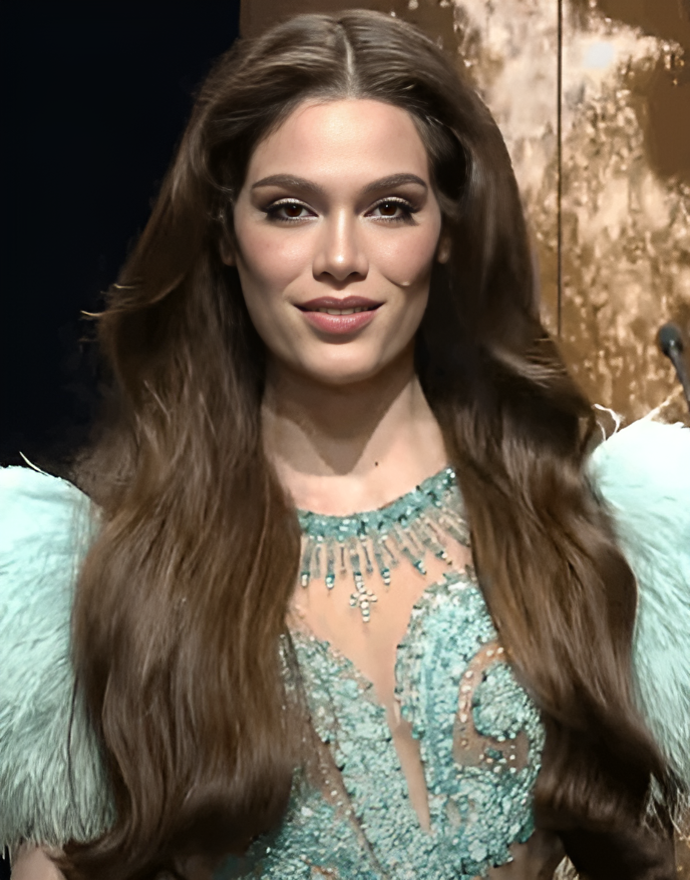
**Miss Grand Venezuela 2024**
Anna Blanco, Distrito Capital

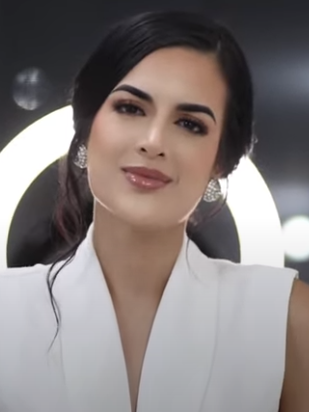
**Miss Grand Venezuela 2023**
Valentina Martínez, Anzoátegui

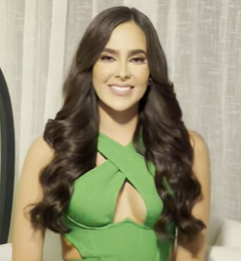
**Miss Grand Venezuela 2022**
Luiseth Materán, Miranda

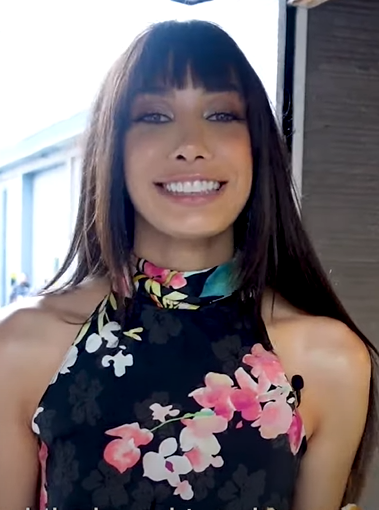
**Miss Grand Venezuela 2021**
Vanessa Coello, Monagas

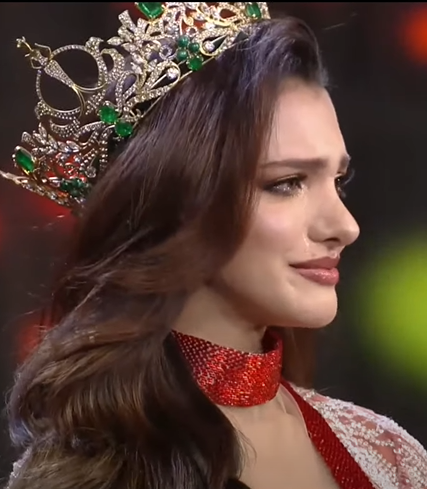
**Miss Grand & Miss Grand Venezuela 2019**
Valentina Figuera, Anzoátegui

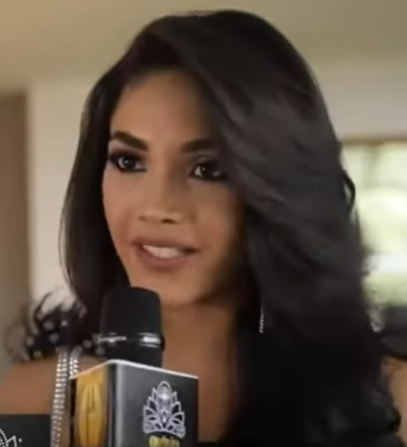
**Grand Venezuela 2018**
Biliannis Álvarez, Zulia

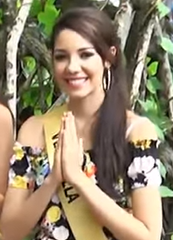
**Miss Grand Venezuela 2015**
Reina Rojas, Distrito Capital

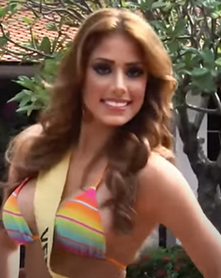
**Miss Grand Venezuela 2014**
Alix Sosa, Distrito Capital

=== Winners by state/region ===
State	Number	Years
Distrito Capital	3	2014; 2015; 2024
Miranda	2	2022 (Note: Assumed the Miss Grand Venezuela title after the original tileholder resigned.); 2025
Anzoátegui	2	**2019**; 2023
Táchira	2	2016; 2017 (Note: Originally Miss Grand Venezuela and resigned.); 2020
Monagas	1	2021
Zulia	1	2018
Falcón	1	2017
La Guaira	1	2013
Mérida	0	2016; 2022

The state later won the Miss Grand International title indicated in bold
The state later inherited the Miss Grand Venezuela title after the original titleholder resigned indicated in italics

Debut wins

Not including states who were inherited the title.

Debut wins timeline
Decade	States/Federal District
2010s	List: 2013: La Guaira; 2014: Distrito Capital; 2016: Táchira; 2017: Falcón; 2018: Zulia; 2019: Anzoátegui
2020s	List: 2021: Monagas; 2022: Miranda

=== States have yet to win Miss Grand Venezuela ===
There have been no Miss Grand Venezuela winners from the following states:

- Amazonas
- Apure
- Aragua
- Barinas
- Bolívar
- Carabobo
- Cojedes
- Delta Amacuro
- Guárico
- Lara
- Mérida
- Nueva Esparta
- Portuguesa
- Sucre
- Trujillo
- Yaracuy

=== Winners by geographical region ===
Region	Titles	Years
Capital	6	2013, 2014, 2015, 2022, 2024, 2025
Eastern	3	2019, 2021, 2023
Andean	2	2016, 2020
Zulian	1	2018
Central-Western	1	2017
Central	0	
Guayana	0	
Insular	0	
Llanos	0	

=== Winners by age ===
Age	Titles	Years
25	3	2014, 2021, 2025
24	2	2020, 2024
22	2	2016, 2023
18	2	2013, 2019
23	2	2015, 2017
26	1	2022
19	1	2018
