= List of Miss Grand Venezuela editions =

The following is a list of Miss Grand Venezuela pageant edition and information.

== Miss Grand Venezuela editions ==
- Designated

Year	Edition	Miss	Original national title	Winning or designation date	Venue	Host city	Female/Male entrants	
2013	—	Vargas	Winner of Señorita Deporte Venezuela 2013	September 13, 2012	Universidad Nueva Esparta	Caracas, Distrito Capital	20	Bruno Caldieron
2014	—	Distrito Capital	6th finalist Miss Mundo Venezuela 2013	August 17	Belankazar Model Agency	Caracas, Distrito Capital		Bruno Caldieron
2015	—	Distrito Capital	Winner of Señorita Deporte Venezuela 2014	July 24	Teatro Santa Fe	Caracas, Distrito Capital		Bruno Caldieron
2016	—	Mérida^{[β]}	Winner of Señorita Deporte Internacional 2015	November 12, 2015	Macaracuay Plaza	Caracas, Distrito Capital	21	Bruno Caldieron
2016	—	Táchira^{[α]}	Top 10 Miss Venezuela 2014	July 29	Belankazar Model Agency	Caracas, Distrito Capital		Bruno Caldieron
2017	—	Táchira^{[β]}	Winner of Señorita Deporte Venezuela 2016	December 15, 2016	Teatro Santa Fe	Caracas, Distrito Capital	10	Bruno Caldieron
2017	—	Falcón^{[α]}	Contestant of Miss Venezuela 2016	October 5, 2016	Estudio 1, Venevisión	Caracas, Distrito Capital	24	Miguel Segovia
2018	—	Zulia	1st runner-up of Miss Venezuela 2017	November 9, 2017	Estudio 5, Venevisión	Caracas, Distrito Capital	24	Miguel Segovia
2019	—	Anzoátegui	Winner of El Concurso by Osmel Sousa 2018	December 17, 2018	Teatro Municipal of Caracas	Caracas, Distrito Capital	22	Osmel Sousa
2020	—	Táchira	Miss Grand Distrito Capital 2020	December 31	Virtual location	Caracas, Distrito Capital		George Wittles
2021	—	Monagas	2nd runner-up of Miss Venezuela 2019	August 24		Caracas, Distrito Capital		George Wittles
2022	—	Mérida^{[β]}	1st runner-up of El Concurso by Osmel Sousa 2022	August 13	Teatro Municipal of Caracas	Caracas, Distrito Capital		George Wittles
2022	—	Miranda^{[α]}	Top 5 Miss Venezuela 2020	September 3	Virtual location	Caracas, Distrito Capital		George Wittles
2022	1st	Anzoátegui	Miss Grand Venezuela 2022	August 13	Teatro Municipal of Caracas	Caracas, Distrito Capital	22	George Wittles
2024	2nd	Distrito Capital	Winner of El Concurso by Osmel Sousa 2023	June 28	Caracas Military Circle	Caracas, Distrito Capital		George Wittles
2024	2nd	Miranda	Miss Grand Venezuela 2024	June 28	Caracas Military Circle	Caracas, Distrito Capital	18	Jacqueline Aguilera

Notes

- ^α Successor.
- ^β Resigned.
- ^γ Dethroned

== Host city by number ==
Currently all 2 editions are held in Caracas.

City	Hosts	Year(s)
Caracas	2	2022–2024

Location count

Currently 2 theaters had served as locations for the Miss Grand Venezuela pageant.

Location	Hosts	Year(s)
Caracas Military Circle	1	2024
Teatro Municipal of Caracas	1	2022

== Hosts and artists ==
The following is a list of Miss Grand Venezuela hosts and invited artists through the years.

Year	Edition	Hosts	Co-hosts	Artists	Broadcaster	Ref
2022	1st	Leo Aldana; Yanuaria Verde	Vanessa Coello		Grand TV	
2024	2nd	Vanessa Coello; Yanuaria Verde; Emmy Carrero	Marián Pérez	Anna Blanco	Grand TV	
