= Miss Grand Venezuela 2025 =

3rd Miss Grand Venezuela competition

- Date: 29 April 2026
- Presenters: Adriana Marval; Adrián Lara; Arnaldo Catanaima
- Venue: Teatro Municipal de Chacao, Caracas
- Broadcaster: Canal i
- Entrants: 38
- Placements: 24
- Debuts: Altos Mirandinos; Costa Oriental; Península Guajira
- Miss Grand Venezuela 2025: Nariman Battikha (Monagas)
- Miss Grand Venezuela 2026: Lady Di Mosquera (Canaima)

Miss Grand Venezuela 2025 was the third Miss Grand Venezuela pageant, scheduled for 29 April 2026. Thirty-eight contestants from different states and cities of Venezuela competed in the early stage to select the representative to Miss Grand International 2025, and the number would be reduced to 24 for the final stage held later for the Miss Grand International 2026.

In the presentation held on 30 August 2025 at the Wynwood Park, Valencia, a 30-year-old model and entrepreneur representing the state of Monagas, Nariman Battikha, was announced as the country representative to Miss Grand International 2025 pageant, later held in Thailand on 18 October 2025. The pageant's early stage was telecast nationwide via Televen, and was hosted by Adriana Marval, Adrián Lara, and Arnaldo Catanaima.

At the conclusion of the final stage held later on 29 April 2026 at the Teatro Municipal de Chacao in Caracas, Lady Di Mosquera of Canaima was named the winner and was crowned by the outgoing titleholder, Nariman Battikha of Monagas. Mosquera will represent her country at Miss Grand International 2026 to be held in India in October 2026.

== Background ==
Initially, Tina Batson, the winner of Miss Grand Venezuela 2024, was expected to compete internationally in 2025. However, the licensee team, led by George Wittles, relinquished the license in late 2024, causing Batson to be affiliated with a new team led by Miss World 1995, Jacqueline Aguilera. Financial issues forced Batson to resign the title in February 2025. After that, Aguilera planned to organize the 2025 contest by franchising the competition license to state-level organizers who would name their state representative for this year's edition, while the replacement for Batson will be appointed.

== Selection of contestants ==
The contestants for this year's edition were elected through national casting and state-level pageants held countrywide. Some states also conducted city-level contests to determine local candidates for the state pageant, such as Miss Grand Noroccidental for the Miss Grand Zulia state pageant. Some finalists might be assigned to represent other states that do not have the Miss Grand franchise.

A national casting held on 5 August 2025 at the Televen Office attracted 63 aspirants, but only 37 qualified for the national final. Each of them was later assigned to represent one of the states or regions of the country on August 8. However, after the delegate presentation and the selection of the country representative to Miss Grand International 2025 held on 30 August in Valencia, the number of finalized candidates will be reduced to 24.

The following is a list of state-level pageants for Miss Grand Venezuela 2025, by the coronation date.

Pageant	Edition	Date & Venue	Entrants	Title(s) (Note: Miss Grand title(s) qualified for the national round)	Ref.
Miss Grand Altos Mirandinos	1st	6 July 2025 at the Sala Emma Soler, Los Teques	6	Altos Mirandinos	
Miss Grand Lara	2nd	22 July at the Hotel Trinitarias Suites, Barquisimeto	20	Lara	
Miss Grand Distrito Capital	2nd	26 July at the Teatro 8 Las Mercedes, Caracas	9	Distrito Capital	
Miss Grand Zulia	1st	30 July 2025 at the Parque Ana María Campos, Maracaibo	12	Zulia; Costa Oriental; Península Guajira	
Miss Grand Carabobo	1st	31 July 2025 at the Hotel Manantial Valencia, Naguanagua	8	Carabobo	

== Result ==
=== Miss Grand Venezuela 2025 ===
Miss Grand Venezuela 2025/26 competition results by states, cities, etc.
Color key:
Main winners	Top 3
Top 7	Top 12
Top 24	Unplaced

Placement	Candidate
Miss Grand Venezuela 2025	Monagas – Nariman Battikha
Reina Hispanoamericana Venezuela 2025	Nueva Esparta - Emely Barile
Reina del Café Venezuela 2025	Canaima – Lady Di Mosquera

=== Miss Grand Venezuela 2026 ===
Placement	Candidate
Miss Grand Venezuela 2026	Canaima – Lady Di Mosquera
Miss Cosmo Venezuela 2026	Carabobo - Paola Donquis
Miss Charm Venezuela 2026	Península de Araya - Oky Espinoza
Reina Hispanoamericana Venezuela 2026	Miranda - Marielen Vacondio
Reina del Café Venezuela 2026	Península de Paria - Fernanda Pernía
Top 7	Amazonas - Yanett Díaz; Zulia - Fabiola Ramírez
Top 13	Comunidad Extranjera - Norma Yamin; Delta Amacuro - Yalixmar Jiménez; Mérida - Luisana Molina; Municipio Chacao - Aisha Marinucci; Yaracuy - Arlymar Linarez

== Contestants ==
24 contestants competed for the title of Miss Grand Venezuela 2026.

State/Locality	Contestant	Age (Note: Ages at the time of the pageant)	Height	Hometown
Amazonas	Yanett Margarita Díaz Dib	27	1.84 m (6 ft 0 in)	Caracas
Anzoátegui	Verónica Valentina Gamboa Itanares	22	1.82 m (6 ft 0 in)	Puerto La Cruz
Barinas	Lorena Marian Bodenski Barrios	29	1.74 m (5 ft 9 in)	Valencia
Bolívar	Rubí Emperatriz Dávila Cotoret	19	1.75 m (5 ft 9 in)	Lecheria
Canaima	Lady Di María Mosquera Hernández	25	1.83 m (6 ft 0 in)	Carora
Carabobo	Paola Andreína Donquis Jiménez	20	1.82 m (6 ft 0 in)	Valencia
Cojedes	Cesilia Conde Palacios	24	1.80 m (5 ft 11 in)	San Carlos
Comunidad Extranjera	Norma Yamin Mouawad	27	1.75 m (5 ft 9 in)	Caracas
Delta Amacuro	Yalixmar del Valle Jiménez González	19	1.80 m (5 ft 11 in)	Casacoima
Dependencias Federales	Bárbara Victoria Bompart Ruiz	22	1.82 m (6 ft 0 in)	Puerto La Cruz
Guayana Esequiba	Eliedic María García Herrera	24	1.80 m (5 ft 11 in)	Caja Seca
La Guaira	Niumelis Alejandra Godoy Antequera	21	1.80 m (5 ft 11 in)	Caracas
Mérida	Luisana Valentina Molina Santiago	21	1.78 m (5 ft 10 in)	Mérida
Miranda	Marielen Ivonne Vacondio Colmenares	22	1.82 m (6 ft 0 in)	Caracas
Municipio Chacao	Aisha Maree Rodríguez Marinucci	25	1.70 m (5 ft 7 in)	Caracas
Municipio Libertador	Katty Gines Valbuena Machado	25	1.80 m (5 ft 11 in)	Caracas
Nueva Esparta	Emely Francesca Barile Correia	22	1.65 m (5 ft 5 in)	Valencia
Península de Araya	Oscaiderlys Alejandra (Oky) Espinoza Palacios	21	1.84 m (6 ft 0 in)	Caucagua
Península de Paria	Fernanda Sophia Pernía Contreras	23	1.79 m (5 ft 10 in)	Caracas
Portuguesa	Giannyna Nathaly Franco D’Luzio	19	1.80 m (5 ft 11 in)	Barquisimeto
Táchira	Yenifer Michel Guerra Carvajal	22	1.79 m (5 ft 10 in)	Villa de Cura
Trujillo	Sthefany Del Carmen Ávila Navarro	25	1.78 m (5 ft 10 in)	Caracas
Yaracuy	Arlymar Linarez Chirinos	20	1.80 m (5 ft 11 in)	Yaritagua
Zulia	Fabiola Andreína Ramírez Romero	22	1.75 m (5 ft 9 in)	Maracaibo

Following the conclusion of the Miss Grand Venezuela 2025 pageant, it was announced that only 24 of the original 37 contestants would continue in the competition for the Miss Grand Venezuela 2026 crown. The contestants listed below did not advance and therefore participated only in the 2025 edition (including Miss Monagas, who won the 2025 title).

State/Locality	Contestant	Age	Height	Hometown
Altos Mirandinos	Zanoa Getsabel Jerusalén Villarreal Hernández	19	1.75 m (5 ft 9 in)	Caracas
Apure	Ruth Valentina De Jong Martínez	21	1.78 m (5 ft 10 in)	Valencia
Aragua	Aldriana de los Ángeles Abreu Hidalgo	19	1.74 m (5 ft 9 in)	Maracay
Comunidad Indigena	Gladys Gabriela Rivas González	22	1.74 m (5 ft 9 in)	Maturín
Costa Oriental	Valentina del Pilar Bambini Torres	20	1.70 m (5 ft 7 in)	Maracaibo
Distrito Capital	Carol Yarabi Trujillo Rodríguez	22	1.73 m (5 ft 8 in)	Caracas
Falcón	Nicole Valentina Brito Salazar	21	1.73 m (5 ft 8 in)	Lecheria
Guárico	Adamary Amarilys Carrasquero Vargas	19	1.74 m (5 ft 9 in)	Cabimas
Lara	Berit Marianne Rinaudo Eriksson	22	1.72 m (5 ft 8 in)	Barquisimeto
Monagas	Nariman Cristina Battikha Yanyi	30	1.80 m (5 ft 11 in)	Maturín
Península Guajira	Adiam Paola Escorihuela Pedreañez	19	1.76 m (5 ft 9 in)	Maracaibo
Península de Paraguaná	Grecia Moreno Pacheco	23	1.82 m (6 ft 0 in)	Valencia
Puerto Cabello	Sophía Victoria Farreras Gutiérrez	21	1.72 m (5 ft 8 in)	Valencia
Sucre	Yuglyannie Eglymar Mata González	23	1.76 m (5 ft 9 in)	Carúpano

== Regional coordinators ==
The following is a list of state-level coordinators responsible for selecting state representatives to the national contest.

- Altos Mirándonos (Note: Non-state level) – Leandro Goncalves Moniz and Efrén Rengel Fornes
- Aragua – Darwin Guerra and Robert Rivas
- Carabobo – Diego Da Silva, Ana Lucia Marsh, and Rhony Coronel
- Costa Oriental – Roberta Di Blasio and Raida Villalobos
- Distrito Capital – Fred Montaño
- Falcón – Nelson Jose
- Lara – José Carlos Alvarez
- Península Guajira – Roberta Di Blasio and Omaira Molero
- Portuguesa – Konna Tapia
- Trujillo – Luis Alfonso Marchena
- Zulia – Roberta Di Blasio and Dra. María Masyrubi
