= Jossie Nikita Marques Spear =

Venezuelan model

Jossie Marques
- Born: Jossie Nikita Marques Spear; May 8, 1989 (age 37); Maracaibo, Venezuela
- Height: 174 cm (5 ft 8 1/2 in)
- Beauty pageant titleholder
- Title: Miss Mundo Latina (Winner); Miss Venezuela (to compete)
- Hair color: Copper
- Eye color: Green

Jossie Nikita Marques Spear is a Venezuelan model, born in Maracaibo, Edo. Zulia and titleholder of the Miss Mundo Latina, who will compete in Miss Venezuela. Her heritage is mixed from Venezuelan, Portuguese, American, and French. She speaks English, Spanish, and Portuguese. Jossie is currently pursuing her bachelor's degree in Fine Arts for Theater at the University of Central Florida. She is 174 cm (5 ft 8 1/2 in) tall.

Jossie is cousin of Mónica Spear, who also won the Miss Venezuela 2004 and placed fourth runner up in the Miss Universe in 2005.
