= Altos Mirandinos metropolitan area =

Altos Mirandinos metropolitan area (Los Teques metropolitan area) Area Metropolitana de los Altos Mirandinos Area Metropolitana de Los Teques
- Conurbation
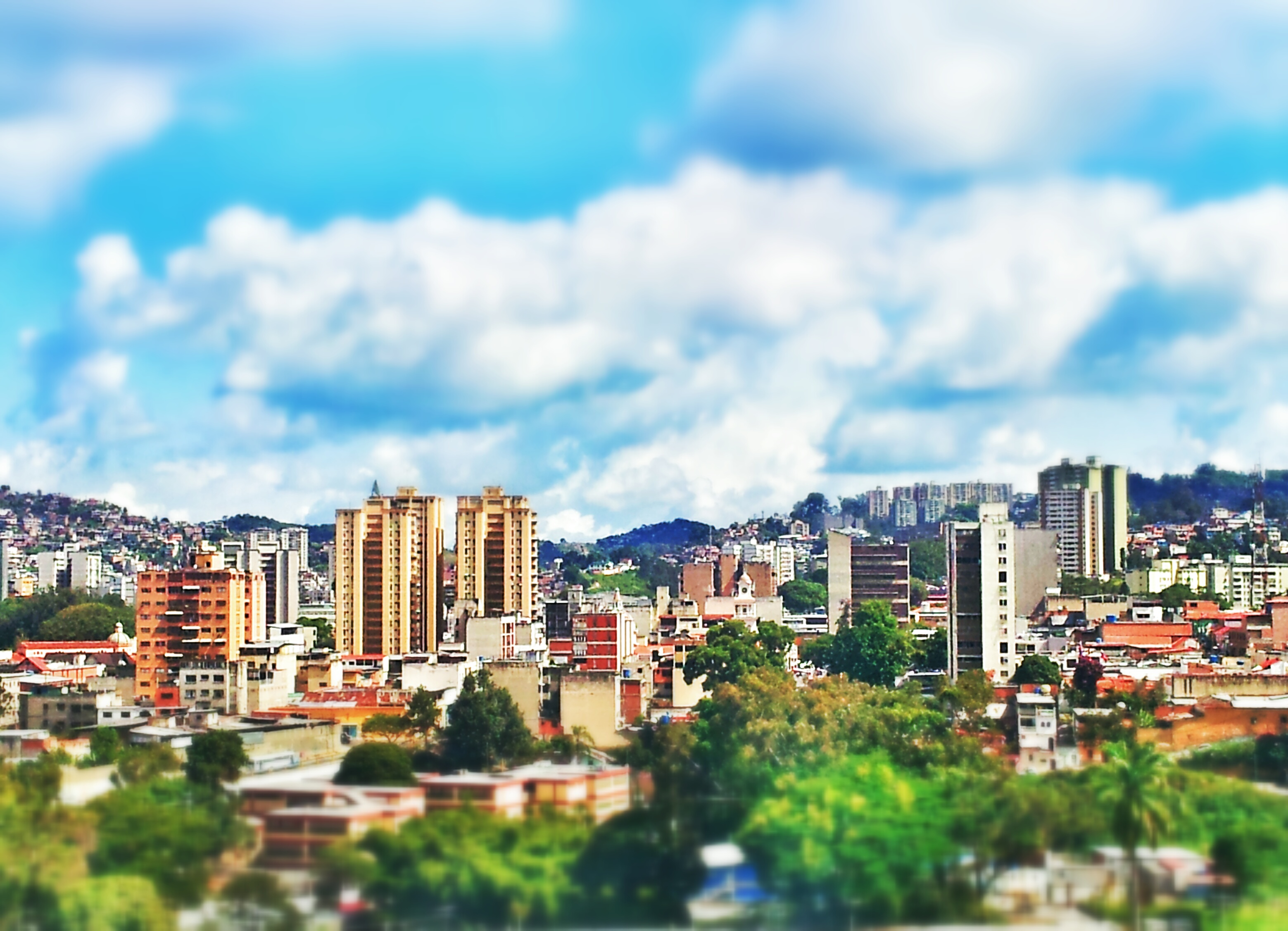
- Los Teques downtown
- Country: Venezuela
- State: Miranda
- Largest Cities: Los Teques; San Antonio de Los Altos; Carrizal

Area
  - Metro: 774 km^{2} (299 sq mi)

Population
  - Metro: 454,929
  - Metro density: 611.46/km^{2} (1,583.7/sq mi)
- Time zone: UTC-4:00 (VST)

Altos Mirandinos metropolitan area or Los Teques metropolitan area (Spanish: Area Metropolitana de Los Altos Mirandinos or Area Metropolitana de Los Teques) is a metropolitan area in Miranda, Venezuela, that includes 3 municipalities, it's part of the Greater Caracas area. It has a population of 454,929 inhabitants.

== Cities ==
The principal cities of the area are (2013):

1. Los Teques (pop. 251,872)
2. San Antonio de Los Altos (pop. 83,866)
3. Carrizal (pop. 58,561)
4. Paracotos (pop. 18,598)
5. San José de Los Altos (pop. 16,489)
6. San Pedro (pop. 13,170)

== Municipalities ==
The 3 municipalities of the area are:

Municipality	Area (km^{2})	Population 2013	Population density 2013 (/km^{2})
Guaicaipuro	661	312,502	472.77
Los Salias	51	83,866	1,644.43
Carrizal	32	58,561	1,830.03
Altos Mirandinos metropolitan area	744	454,929	611.46

== Transportation ==
=== Metro ===
The Los Teques Metro is the most important public transportation in the area with an operating line that runs for 9.5 kilometers. The system connects the city of Los Teques with the capital of Caracas.

==== Timeline of line extensions ====
Line	Station	Station	Length	Status
1	Las Adjuntas	Ayacucho	-.- km	opened, on October 7, 2015
1	Las Adjuntas	Alí Primera	9.5 km	In everyday service
2	Alí Primera	Guaicaipuro	0.7 km	opened on December 11, 2012
2	Guaicaipuro	Independencia	1.0 km	opened on December 1, 2013
2	Independencia	Los Cerritos	1.7 km	opened on December 1, 2013
2	Los Cerritos	Carrizal	1.7 km	under construction, for service TBA
2	Carrizal	La Carbonera	-.- km	under construction, for service TBA
2	Carrizal	Las Minas	4.3 km	under construction, for service TBA
2	Las Minas	San Antonio	2.5 km	under construction, for service TBA
3	San Antonio	La Morita	1.5 km	planning
3	La Morita	San Diego	1.6 km	planning
3	San Diego	Potrerito	4.9 km	planning
3	Potrerito	La Mariposa	3.0 km	planning
3	La Mariposa	La Rinconada	7.5 km	planning

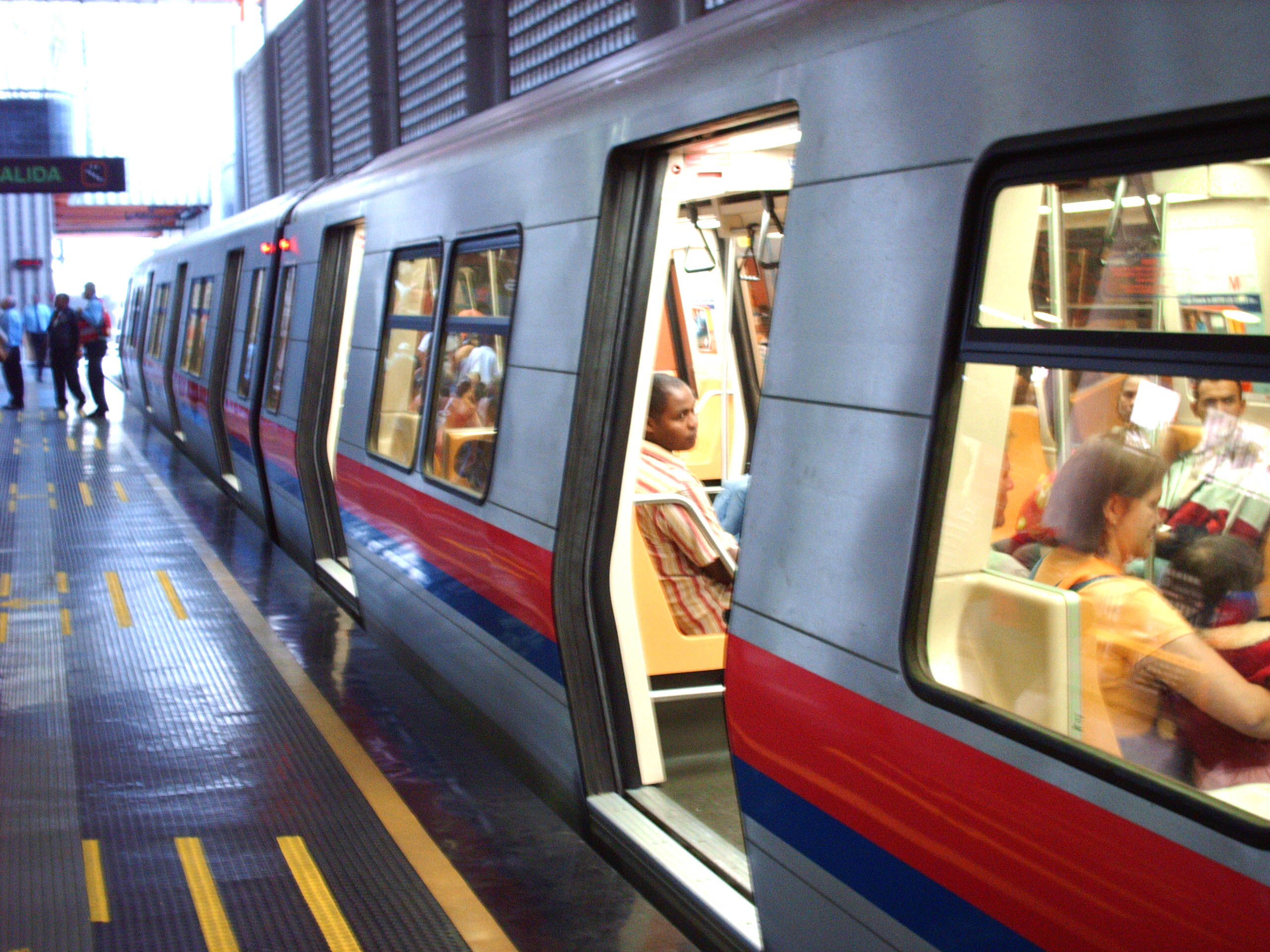
Los Teques Metro

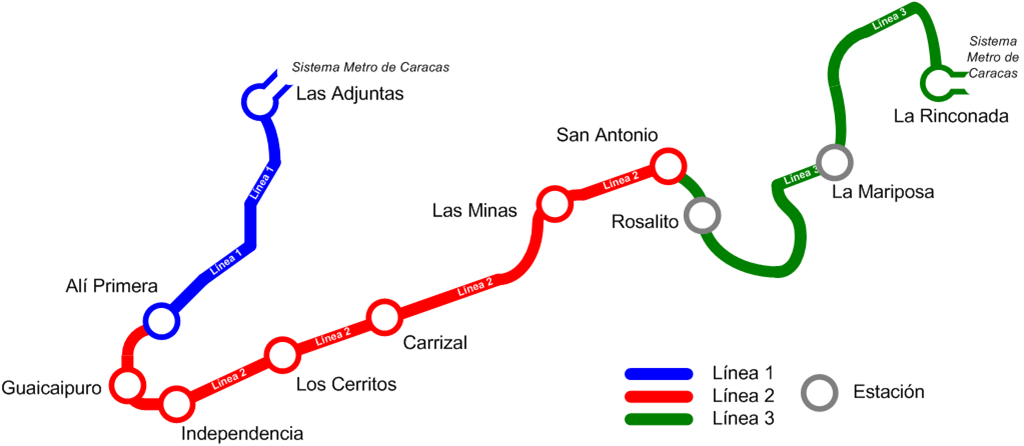
Current and future lines of Los Teques Metro system

== See also ==
- Greater Caracas
- List of metropolitan areas of Venezuela
