= Miss Grand Venezuela =

Venezuelan beauty pageant

- Established: 2022; 4 years ago
- Founder: George Wittles
- Type: Beauty pageant
- Headquarters: Caracas
- Location: Venezuela
- Members: Miss Grand International Miss Charm Miss Cosmo Reina Hispanoamericana Reina Internacional del Café Miss Elite
- Official language: Spanish
- Key people: Jacqueline Aguilera (President)
- Parent organization: El Concurso by Osmel Sousa (2019, 2025 – present)

Miss Grand Venezuela
licensees timeline

Stand-alone pageant
Under another pageant
Appointed titleholder

Miss Grand Venezuela is a Venezuelan female beauty pageant that has been held for the first time in 2022 to select the country's representatives to compete in its parent stage Miss Grand International, in which Venezuela acquired the main title once in 2019, won by a 19-year-old model from Anzoátegui, Valentina Figuera. Another highlight achievement is the first runner-up, obtained in 2017 by Tulia Alemán of Falcón.

Venezuela's representatives always got placement at Miss Grand International, except for 2020, however, during 2013 - 2021, all such representatives were appointed instead of organizing the Miss Grand national contest. The first edition of Miss Grand Venezuela was held in August 2022 in Caracas.

The current Miss Grand Venezuela is Lady Di Mosquera of Canaima, who was crowned on April 29, 2026.

== Background ==
=== History ===
Venezuela has been participating in the Miss Grand International since its establishment in 2013. Throughout 2013 – 2016, under the leadership of a Venezuelan marketing publicist Bruno Caldieron, either winners or runners-up of the "Señorita Deporte Venezuela" pageant were designated as Miss Grand Venezuela. Thenceforward, the license of Miss Grand Venezuela was respectively transferred to Miguel Segovia, Osmel Sousa, and George Wittles in 2017, 2019, and 2020. However, the country representatives during such periods were all appointed; no respective national pageant was held to elect the titleholders. Until 2021, the inaugural edition of Miss Grand Venezuela was expected to be held under the leadership of George Wittles but postponed to 2022 due to the COVID-19 pandemic, the country's representative was instead appointed.

After the aforementioned urgent postponement, the inaugural edition of the national contest "Miss Grand Venezuela" finally took place in Caracas in July 2022, the winner of such becomes the first Miss Grand Venezuela titleholder to be elected through the Miss Grand national pageant.

=== Selection of contestants ===
In the first edition of Miss Grand Venezuela, the national aspirants were determined either by the state licensee or the national organizer through their regional contests or casting events, in which some state pageants were permitted to select more than one qualified winner, such as Miss Grand Los Andes held in San Cristóbal, where the representatives of Táchira, Barinas, Mérida, and Trujillo, were determined.

== Editions ==
=== Date and location ===
Year	Edition	Date	Final venue	Host state	Entrants	Ref.
2022	1st	13 August	Teatro Municipal of Caracas	Capital District	22	
2024	2nd	28 June	Salón Venezuela, Círculo Militar, Caracas	Capital District	18	
2025/ 26	3rd	30 August (Note: To select the country representative for Miss Grand International 2025)	Wynwood Park, Valencia	Carabobo	38	
2025/ 26	3rd	29 April (Note: To select the country representative for Miss Grand International 2026)	Teatro Municipal de Chacao, Caracas	Capital District	23	

=== Competition results ===
Year	Miss Grand Venezuela	1st Runner Up	2nd Runner Up	3rd Runner Up	4th Runner Up	5th Runner Up	Ref.
2022	Valentina Martínez (Anzoátegui)	Delia Santander (Barinas)	Iraima Castillo (Táchira)	Valeria Camacho (La Guaira)	Valeria Cárdenas (Mérida)	Not Awarded	
2024	Tina Batson (Miranda)	Andrea Del Val (Nueva Esparta)	Camila Soto (La Guaira)	Shania Sleiman (Dependencias Federales)	Paola Marín (Yaracuy)	Helen Chacón (Táchira)	
2025	Nariman Battikha (Monagas)	No runner-up, the remaining contestants competed again for the 2026 title.					
2026	Lady Di Mosquera (Canaima)	Marielen Vacondio Oky Espinoza (Miranda) (Península de Araya)					

== Venezuelan representatives ==
=== Miss Grand Venezuela ===
Color key

- Declared as winner
- Ended as runner-up (top 5)
- Ended as one of the finalists (top 10)
- Ended as one of the semifinalists (top 20/21)
- Ended as special awards winner

Year	State	Miss Grand Venezuela	Placement at Miss Grand International	Original national title	National licensee	Ref.
2026	Canaima	Lady Di Mosquera	5th Runners-up	Miss Grand Venezuela 2026	Jacqueline Aguilera	
2025	Monagas	Nariman Battikha	4th Runner-up	Miss Grand Venezuela 2025	Jacqueline Aguilera	
2025	Miranda	Tina Batson	Resigned	Miss Grand Venezuela 2024	George Wittles	
2024	Capital District	Anna Blanco	Unplaced	Winner of El Concurso by Osmel Sousa 2023	George Wittles	
2023	Anzoátegui	Valentina Martínez	Unplaced	Miss Grand Venezuela 2022	George Wittles	
2022	Miranda	Luiseth Materán^{[α]}	3rd Runner-Up	Top 5 Miss Venezuela 2020	George Wittles	
2022	Mérida	Sabrina Deraneck^{[β]}	Not able to compete	1st runner-up of El Concurso by Osmel Sousa 2022	George Wittles	
2021	Monagas	Vanessa Coello	Top 10	2nd runner-up of Miss Venezuela 2019	George Wittles	
2020	Táchira	Eliana Roa	Unplaced	Miss Grand Distrito Capital 2020	George Wittles	
2019	Anzoátegui	Valentina Figuera	Miss Grand International 2019	Winner of El Concurso by Osmel Sousa 2018	Osmel Sousa	
2018	Zulia	Biliannis Álvarez	Top 10	1st runner-up of Miss Venezuela 2017	Miguel Segovia	
2017	Falcón	Tulia Alemán^{[α]}	1st Runner-Up	Contestant of Miss Venezuela 2016	Miguel Segovia	
2017	Táchira	Maritza Contreras^{[β]}	Not able to compete	Winner of Señorita Deporte Venezuela 2016	Bruno Caldieron	
2016	Táchira	Débora Medina	Top 21	Top 10 Miss Venezuela 2014	Bruno Caldieron	
2015	Capital District	Reina Rojas	Top 20	Winner of Señorita Deporte Venezuela 2014	Bruno Caldieron	
2014	Capital District	Alix Sosa	Top 20	6th finalist Miss Mundo Venezuela 2013	Bruno Caldieron	
2013	Vargas	Mariana Jiménez	Top 10	Winner of Señorita Deporte Venezuela 2013	Bruno Caldieron	

Notes

- ^α Successor.
- ^β Resigned.
- ^γ Dethroned

==== Miss Grand International Venezuela gallery ====
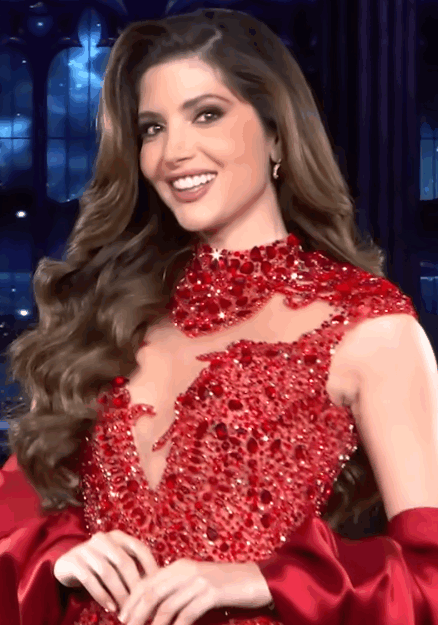
Miss Grand Venezuela 2025
Nariman Battikha

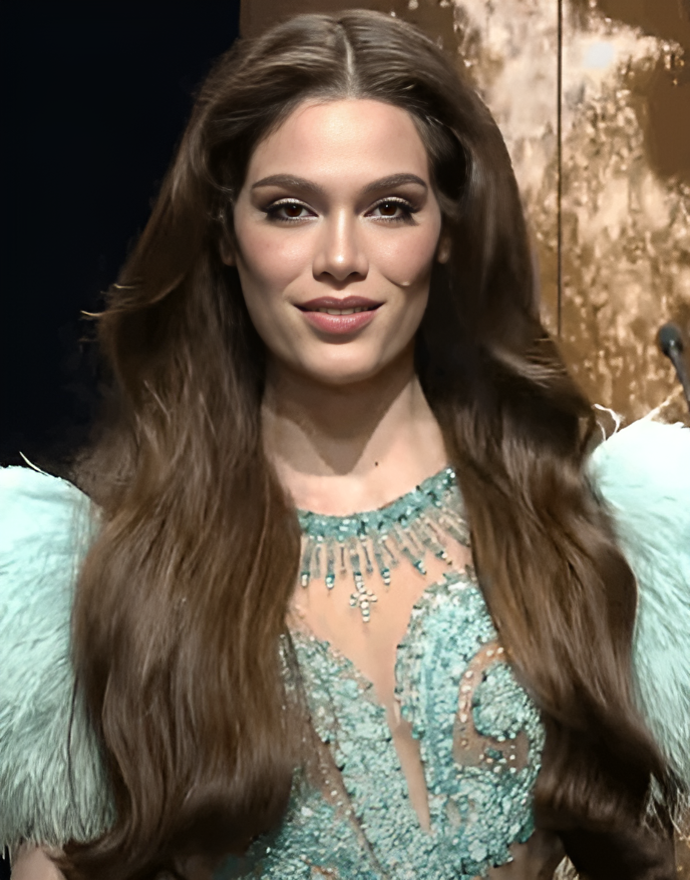
Miss Grand Venezuela 2024
Anna Blanco

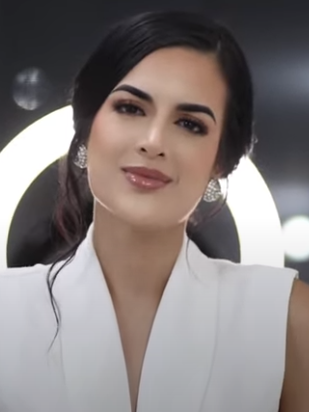
Miss Grand Venezuela 2023
Valentina Martínez

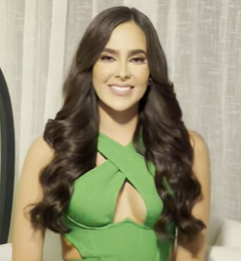
Miss Grand Venezuela 2022
Luiseth Materán

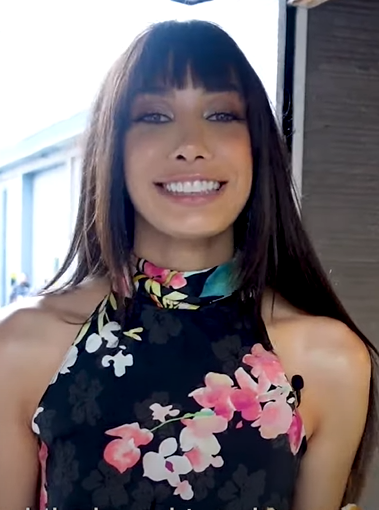
Miss Grand Venezuela 2021
Vanessa Coello

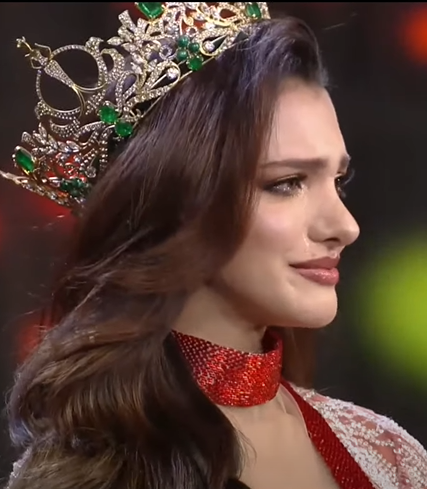
Miss Grand Venezuela 2019
Valentina Figuera

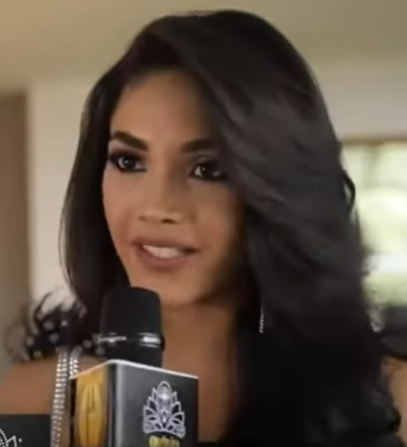
Miss Grand Venezuela 2018
Biliannis Álvarez

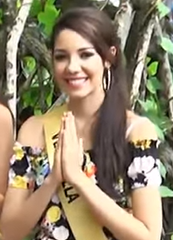
Miss Grand Venezuela 2015
Reina Rojas

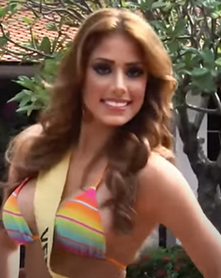
Miss Grand Venezuela 2014
Alix Sosa

==== Winners by state ====
States by number of titleholders
States	Number	Year(s)
Táchira	3	2016, 2017^{[β]}, 2020
Monagas	2	2021, 2025
Anzoátegui	2	2019, 2023
Distrito Capital	2	2014, 2015
Miranda	1	2022^{[α]}
Mérida	1	2022^{[β]}
Zulia	1	2018
Falcón	1	2017^{[α]}
Vargas	1	2013

=== Miss Venezuela Intercontinental ===
Color key

- Declared as winner
- Ended as runner-up
- Ended as top 5/8 qualification
- Ended as one of the finalists or semifinalists
- Ended as special awards winner

In 2023, George Wittles owned the rights to send the Venezuelan representative to Miss Intercontinental.

Year	State	Miss Intercontinental Venezuela	Placement at Miss Intercontinental	Notes
2025	Lara	Rubí Esmeralda Crespo Pérez	Unplaced
2024	Aragua	Georgette Gabriela Musrie Efeisa	1st Runner-Up	Unplaced in Miss Venezuela 2023 (Miss Congeniality; Best Face)
2023	Yaracuy	Migleth del Valle Cuevas Mujica	Top 22	2nd Runner-Up in Miss Venezuela 2021
2022	Táchira	Emmy Marianne Carrero Mora	5th Runner-Up	Miss Power of Beauty; Miss Global Beauty Venezuela 2021
2021	Carabobo	Auri Esthefani López Camejo	Unplaced	Miss Intercontinental Venezuela 2019
2020	Due to the impact of COVID-19 pandemic, no competition held
2019	Miranda	Brenda Suárez Villamizar	Top 20	3rd place in Social Proyect; Miss Intercontinental Venezuela 2018
2018	Amazonas	Gina Alessandra Paula Bitorzoli Pinto	Unplaced	Miss Intercontinental Venezuela 2017
2017	Táchira	Maritza Paola Contreras Reyes	Unplaced	Señorita Deporte Venezuela 2016
2016	Barinas	Amal Karina Nemer Erched	4th Runner-Up	Miss Intercontinental South America 2016; Miss Photogenic (awarded by BIONA Company); Miss Beautiful; Señorita Centro Occidental 2016
2015	Miranda	Katherine Charlotte García Salinas	3rd Runner-Up	Miss Intercontinental South America 2015; 2nd place as Miss Photogenic and as Best in Swimwear; Unplaced in Miss Venezuela 2015
2014		María Alejandra Sanllorente	Unplaced
2013		Iswill Carolina Raben Ortega	Unplaced	Miss Intercontinental Spain 2013
2012	Distrito Capital	Daniela Xanadú Chalbaud Maldonado	Miss Intercontinental 2012	Miss Intercontinental South America 2012; Unplaced in Miss Venezuela 2012
2011		Maria Eugenia Sánchez Pacheco	Unplaced
2010	Anzoátegui	Flory Gabriela Díez Estrada	Top 15	Top 10 in Miss Venezuela 2009
2009	Cojedes	Hannely Zulami Quintero Ledezma	Miss Intercontinental 2009	Miss Intercontinental Americas 2009; Top 15 in Miss World 2008; Top 8 in Reina Hispanoamericana 2007; Miss World Venezuela 2007
2008	Lara	María Gabriela Garmendia Sandoval	Top 5	Fourth place in the Top 5; Unplaced in Miss Venezuela 2007
2007	Yaracuy	Iselmar Antonietta Burgos Reyes	Top 16	Miss Photogenic; Unplaced in Miss Venezuela 2007
2006		Karla Krupij Digna	Top 12
2005	Lara	Emmarys Diliana Pinto Peralta	Miss Intercontinental 2005	Top 10 in Miss Venezuela 2004
2004	Península de Araya	María Eugenia Hernández Ereu	Unplaced	Miss Photogenic; Top 20 in Miss Venezuela 2003
2003	Zulia	Ana Graciela Quintero Nava	1st Runner-Up	4th Runner-Up in Miss Venezuela 2002
2002	Táchira	Aura Consuelo Zambrano Alijas	4th Runner-Up	1st Runner-Up in Miss International 2001; 1st Runner-Up in Miss Venezuela 2001
2001	Guárico	Ligia Fernanda Petit Vargas	Miss Intercontinental 2001	Reina Sudamericana 2000; 1st Runner-Up in Miss Atlántico Internacional 2000; 1st Runner-Up in Miss Venezuela 2000
2000	Sucre	Reiyna Fabiola Borges Noguera	2nd Runner-Up	Unplaced in Miss Venezuela 2000
Did not compete between 1992—1999
1991	Barinas	Dairy Nuccely Pérez Castillo	4th Runner-Up	Unplaced in Miss Venezuela 1990
1990	Falcón	Carolina Durán Canal	1st Runner-Up	4th Runner-Up in Miss Venezuela 1990; Semifinalist in Miss All Nations 1990; Miss Tourism International 1990
1989	Portuguesa	Nancy Elena García Amor	Did not compete	1st Runner-Up in Miss Venezuela 1988
1988	No competition held
1987	Did not compete
1986	Did not compete
1985	No competition held
1984	No competition held
Rene Lacle pageant ownership era
1983	Distrito Federal	Helene Suzette Chemaly Abudei	Top 12	4th Runner-Up in Miss Venezuela 1983
1982	Lara (assumed)	Sondra Carpio Useche	Top 12	4th Runner-Up in Miss Venezuela 1982; Miss Confraternidad Americana de Venezuela 1982
Miss Teen Intercontinental
1981		Elizabeth Betancourt	Unplaced
1980		María Eugenia O'Baró	4th Runner-Up	Miss Princesita Venezuela 1980
1979	Zulia	Enza Carbone	Top 12	Miss Casino; Miss Princesita Venezuela 1979; Retired candidate in Miss Venezuela 1982 as Miss Mérida
Miss Teenage Intercontinental
1978		Rosa del Valle Martínez Sayago	Top 14	1st Runner-Up in Maja Internacional 1979
1977		Zulay Hurtado Sotillo	Top 12
1976		Lee Anne Goiri	Top 7	Sixth place in the Top 7; Miss Princesita Venezuela 1976
1975		María Ingrid Centeno Carreño	1st Runner-Up	Miss Princesita Venezuela 1975
1974	Bolívar	María Emilia de los Ríos	Miss Teenage Intercontinental 1974
Miss Teenage Peace International
1973		Ruth Ferrara	Top 7
1972	Uncertainty about the completion of the 1971 and 1972 editions
1971	Uncertainty about the completion of the 1971 and 1972 editions

Notes

- Alexa Fernanda Paredes Terán was replaced by Migleth Cuevas in 2023; Isabel Andreína Mogollón by María Alejandra Sanllorente in 2014 and Hilda Fleitas by María Eugenia Hernández in 2004.
- Margarita Island competed in Miss Intercontinental twice. Inés Mercedes Mujica Díaz placed as Top 12 in 2002 and Emily Fernández ended as 2nd Runner-Up in 2007.
- Natascha Börger, Miss Yaracuy in Miss Venezuela 2000 competed as the German representative in Miss Intercontinental 2002 placing as 2nd Runner-Up.

Miss Intercontinental Venezuela gallery

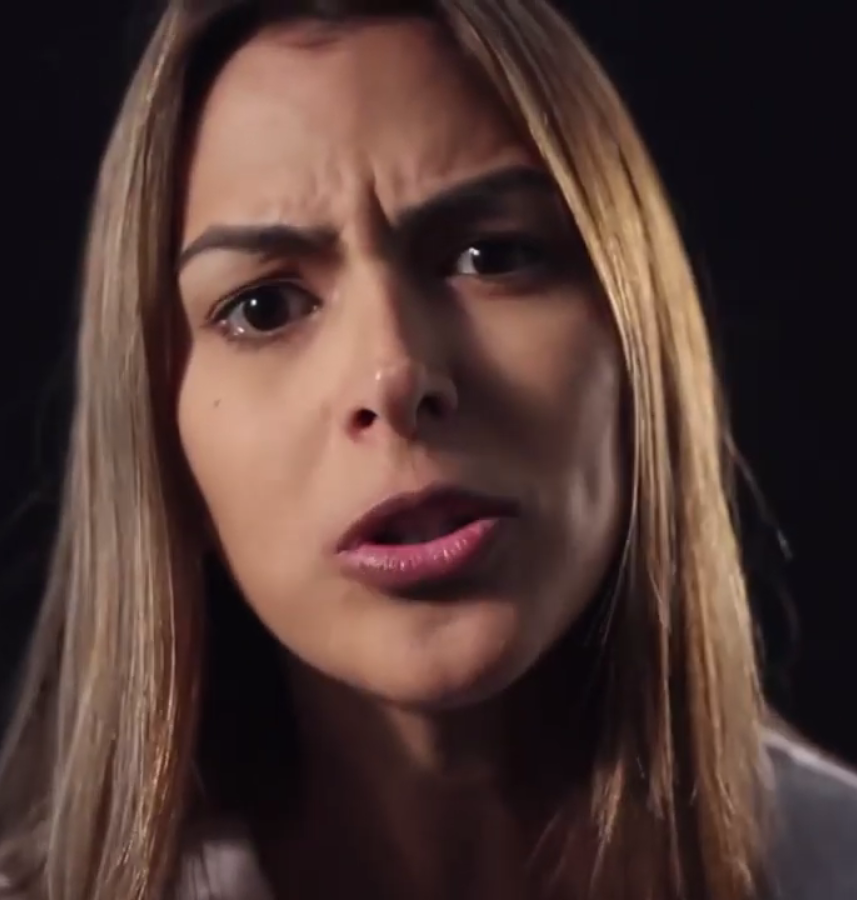
1st Runner-Up in Miss Venezuela 2000 and Miss Intercontinental 2001
Ligia Petit

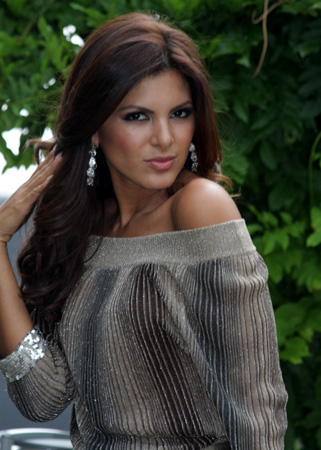
Miss World Venezuela 2007 and Miss Intercontinental 2009
Hannelly Quintero

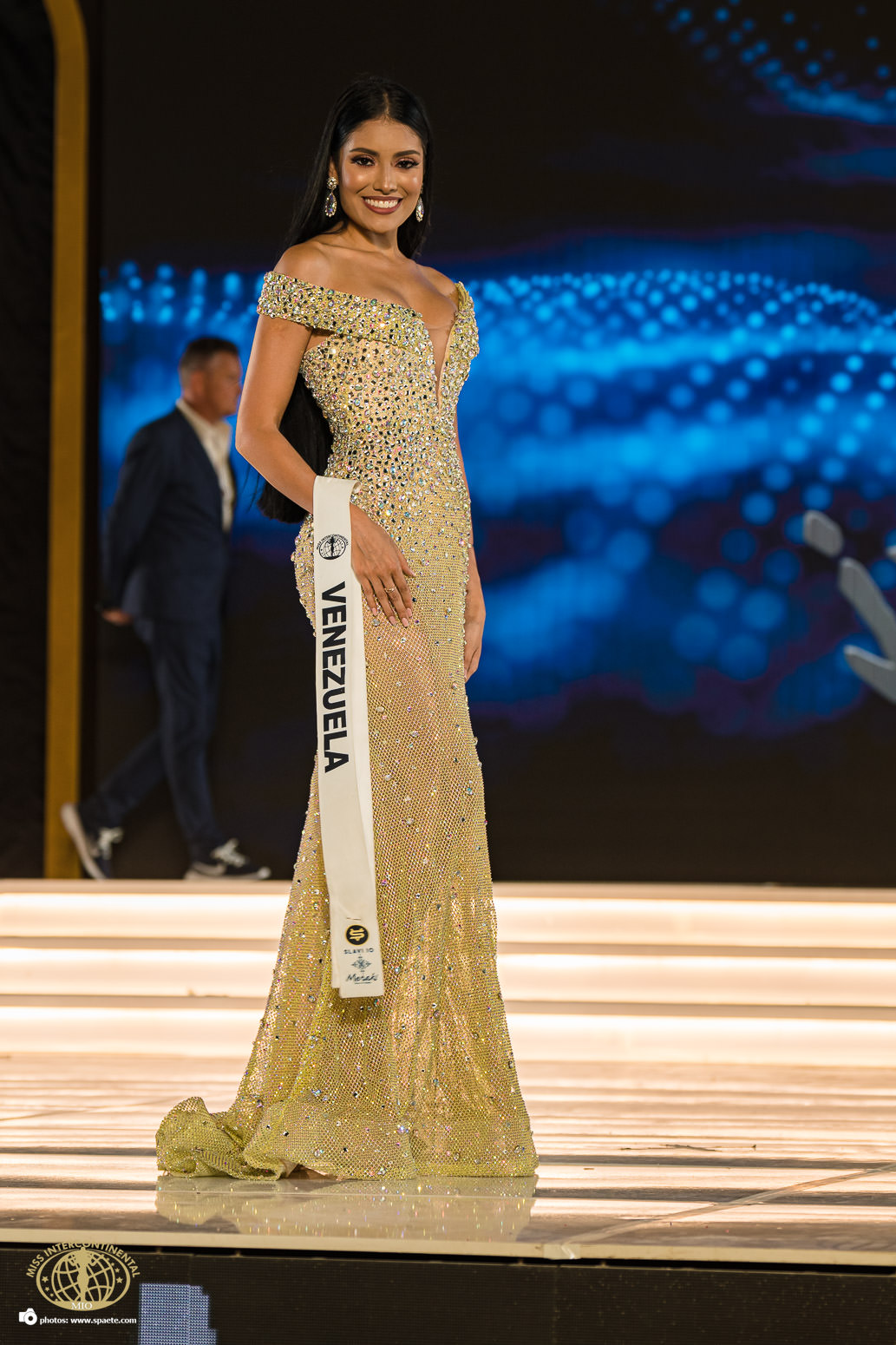
Miss Intercontinental Venezuela 2021
Emmy Carrero

== See also ==
- Miss Venezuela
- Miss Earth Venezuela
