= Miss Grand Anzoátegui =

State-level beauty pageant in Venezuela

- Formation: December 14, 2021; 4 years ago
- Founder: José Alexander Herrera
- Type: Beauty pageant
- Headquarters: Anzoátegui
- Location: Venezuela
- Members: Miss Grand Venezuela
- Official language: Spanish
- Director: José Alexander Herrera (2022–Present)
- Parent organization: Coach de Misses (2022–Present)

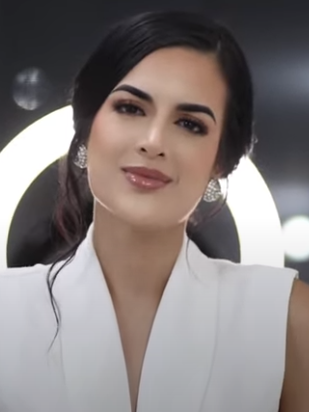
Valentina Martínez, Miss Grand Anzoátegui 2022.

Miss Grand Anzoátegui is a state-level beauty pageant in Venezuela, founded in 2021 by an Anzoátegui-based pageant coach, José Alexander Herrera. The contest's winner represents the state of Anzoátegui at the Miss Grand Venezuela national pageant.

The Anzoátegui representative has won the national contest once, in 2022 by Valentina Martínez; she later represented Venezuela at the 2022 international pageant in Indonesia but was unplaced.

== History ==
After a Venezuelan jewelry designer, George Wittles, obtained the license to run Miss Grand Venezuela in 2020, he franchised regional licenses to state organizers who would name the state representatives for the national contest. For the state of Anzoátegui, the franchise was granted to José Alexander Herrera, the director of a pageant training academy named Coach de Misses. He organized the first Miss Grand Anzoátegui contest in December 2021, and the contest's winner, Valentina Martínez, later won the national competition held in Caracas in August 2022.

== Edition ==
The following table details Miss Grand Anzoátegui's annual editions since 2021.

Edition	Date	Final venue	Entrants	Winner	Ref.
1st	December 14, 2021	Maremares Hotel Marina & Spa, Lechería	18	Valentina Martínez	
2nd	December 27, 2022	Teatro Cajigal, Barcelona	13	Silvana Lomonaco	

== National competition ==
The following is a list of Anzoátegui representatives who competed at the Miss Grand Venezuela national pageant.

Year	Representative	Original provincial title	Placement at Miss Grand Venezuela	Ref.
2022	Valentina Martínez	Miss Grand Anzoátegui 2022	Winner	
2023	No national pageant was held			
2024	Silvana Lomonaco	Miss Grand Anzoátegui 2023/24	Top 12	
2025	No national pageant was held			
