= Jesús Muñoz =

Jesús Muñoz may refer to:

- Jesús Muñoz Tébar (1847-1909), Venezuelan politician
- Jesús Muñoz (footballer) (born 1976), Spanish footballer
