= Miss Grand La Guaira =

State-level beauty pageant in Venezuela

- Formation: April 22, 2022; 4 years ago
- Founder: Juan Silva
- Type: Beauty pageant
- Headquarters: La Guaira
- Location: Venezuela
- Members: Miss Grand Venezuela
- Official language: Spanish
- Director: Juan Silva (2022–2024)

Miss Grand La Guaira is a Venezuelan state-level beauty pageant founded in 2022 by a choreographer Juan Silva, to select La Guaira's representatives to the Miss Grand Venezuela national contest.

La Guaira has participated in the Miss Grand Venezuela pageant since 2022 but its representatives have yet to win the title; the highest achievement they reached was the second and third runners-up, obtained in 2024 and 2022, respectively.

== History ==
After a Venezuelan jewelry designer George Wittles obtained the license of Miss Grand Venezuela in 2020, he franchised the regional licenses to state organizers who would name the state representatives for the national contest. For the state of La Guaira, the franchise was granted to the choreographer Juan Silva, who organized the first Miss Grand La Guaira contest in August 2022, and Valeria Camacho was named the first Miss Grand La Guaira.

== Edition ==
The following table details Miss Grand La Guaira's annual editions since 2022.

Edition	Date	Final venue	Entrants	Winner	Ref.
1st	April 22, 2022	Eurobuilding Hotel Maiquetía, Vargas	11	Valeria Camacho	
2nd	September 14, 2023	Bambú Beach Club, Macuto	8	Camila Soto Gil	

== National competition ==
The following is a list of La Guaira representatives who competed at the Miss Grand Venezuela national pageant.

Year	Representative	Original provincial title	Placement at Miss Grand Venezuela	Ref.
2022	Valeria Camacho	Miss Grand La Guaira 2022	3rd runner-up	
2024	Camila Soto Gil	Miss Grand La Guaira 2023/24	2nd runner-up	
