= Los Salias Municipality =

Los Salias Municipality Municipio Los Salias
- Municipality
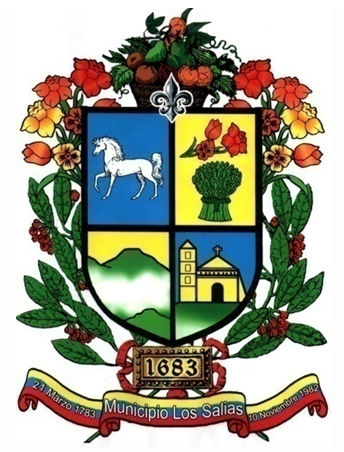
- Flag Coat of arms
- Nickname: Ciudad Dormitorio
- Location in Miranda

- Location in Venezuela
- Coordinates: 10°22′58″N 66°56′56″W
- Country: Venezuela
- State: Miranda
- Founded: May 1st 1683
- Municipal seat: San Antonio de Los Altos

Government
  - Mayor: Edgar Laya Jiménez (MIN-UNIDAD)

Area
  - Total: 63.3 km^{2} (24.4 sq mi)

Population (2011)
  - Total: 68,000
  - Density: 1,100/km^{2} (2,800/sq mi)
- Time zone: UTC−4 (VET)
- Postal code(s): 1204
- Area code(s): 0212
- Website: Official website

Los Salias, founded in 1982, is one of the 21 municipalities (municipios) that makes up the Venezuelan state of Miranda and, according to a 2011 population estimate by the National Institute of Statistics of Venezuela, the municipality has a population of 68000. It's located approximately 14 km away from Caracas and it borders with the Capital District to the north, Guaicaipuro Municipality to the south, Baruta to the east and Carrizal to the west. Los Salias has an Area of 51 km^{2} and a max altitude of 1700 metres above sea level. The town of San Antonio de Los Altos is the municipal seat of Los Salias.

== Demographics ==
According to a 2011 population estimate by the National Institute of Statistics of Venezuela (INE), Los Salias Municipality, has a population of 68.000. The municipality's population density is 1,333.33 inhabitants per square kilometre (3,453.3/sq mi).

== Government ==
The mayor of the Los Salias Municipality is José Antonio Fernández López, elected on December 12 with 59.9% of the vote. The municipality is divided into one parish (San Antonio de Los Altos).
