= Melissa Jiménez (model) =

Miss International Venezuela 2019

- Born: Melissa Ester Jiménez Guevara; December 9, 1998 (age 27); Maracaibo, Zulia, Venezuela
- Occupations: Model; Nutrition and Dietetics student
- Height: 1.74 m (5 ft 9 in)
- Beauty pageant titleholder
- Title: Miss Zulia 2019; Miss Venezuela International 2019
- Hair color: Black
- Eye color: Black
- Major competitions: Miss Venezuela 2019; (Miss Venezuela International 2019); (Best Hair); Miss International 2019; (Top 15); (Best in Evening Gown)

Melissa Ester Jiménez Guevara (born December 9, 1998, in Maracaibo, Zulia) is a Venezuelan model and beauty pageant titleholder who was crowned Miss Venezuela International 2019. She represented the state of Zulia at the pageant and represented Venezuela at Miss International 2019 where she finished as Top 15.

== Personal life ==
Jiménez was born and raised in Maracaibo, Zulia state, Venezuela. She is currently studying a bachelor's degree in Nutrition and Dietetics at University of Zulia in Maracaibo city. She was also a professional acro dancer for 13 years and is a certified life coach.

Melissa started modeling at the age of 15.

== Pageantry ==
=== Miss Zulia 2018 ===
The first participation of Jiménez on a beauty contest was in the regional competition, Miss Zulia 2018, where she was selected as one of the winners.

=== Miss Venezuela 2019 ===
Jiménez stands at 174 centimeters and competed as Miss Zulia 2019. As one of 24 finalists in her country's national competition, she was awarded Best Hair at the grand final show of Miss Venezuela 2019. She succeeded outgoing Miss Venezuela International 2017 and Miss International 2018, Mariem Velazco of Barinas.

=== Miss International 2019 ===
On November 12, 2019, she represented Venezuela at the Miss International 2019 pageant hosted in the Tokyo Dome City Hall in Tokyo, Japan. For her national costume, she chose to represent an allegory of Wayuu communities. On the final night she placed as one of the Top 15.

Awards and achievements
Preceded by (Australia) Emily Tokić (Indonesia) Vania Fitryanti (Madagascar) Esmeralda Malleka (Mexico) Nebai Torres (Paraguay) Daisy Lezcano (Thailand) Keeratiga Jaruratjamon (Ukraine) Bohdana Tarasyk	Miss International Top 15 Semifinalsit (with (Belarus) Maria Perviy, (Finland) Jutta Kyllönen, (Hong Kong) Kaye Cheung, (Netherlands) Elize Joanne de Hong, (Puerto Rico) Ivana Carolina Irizarry and (Sri Lanka) Pawani Vithanage); 2019	Succeeded by Incumbent
Preceded by (Barinas, Venezuela) Mariem Velazco	Miss Venezuela International; 2019	Succeeded by (Bolívar (state)) Isbel Parra
Preceded by María Eugenia Penoth	Miss Zulia; 2019	Succeeded by Mariángel Villasmil
