= San Antonio de Los Altos =

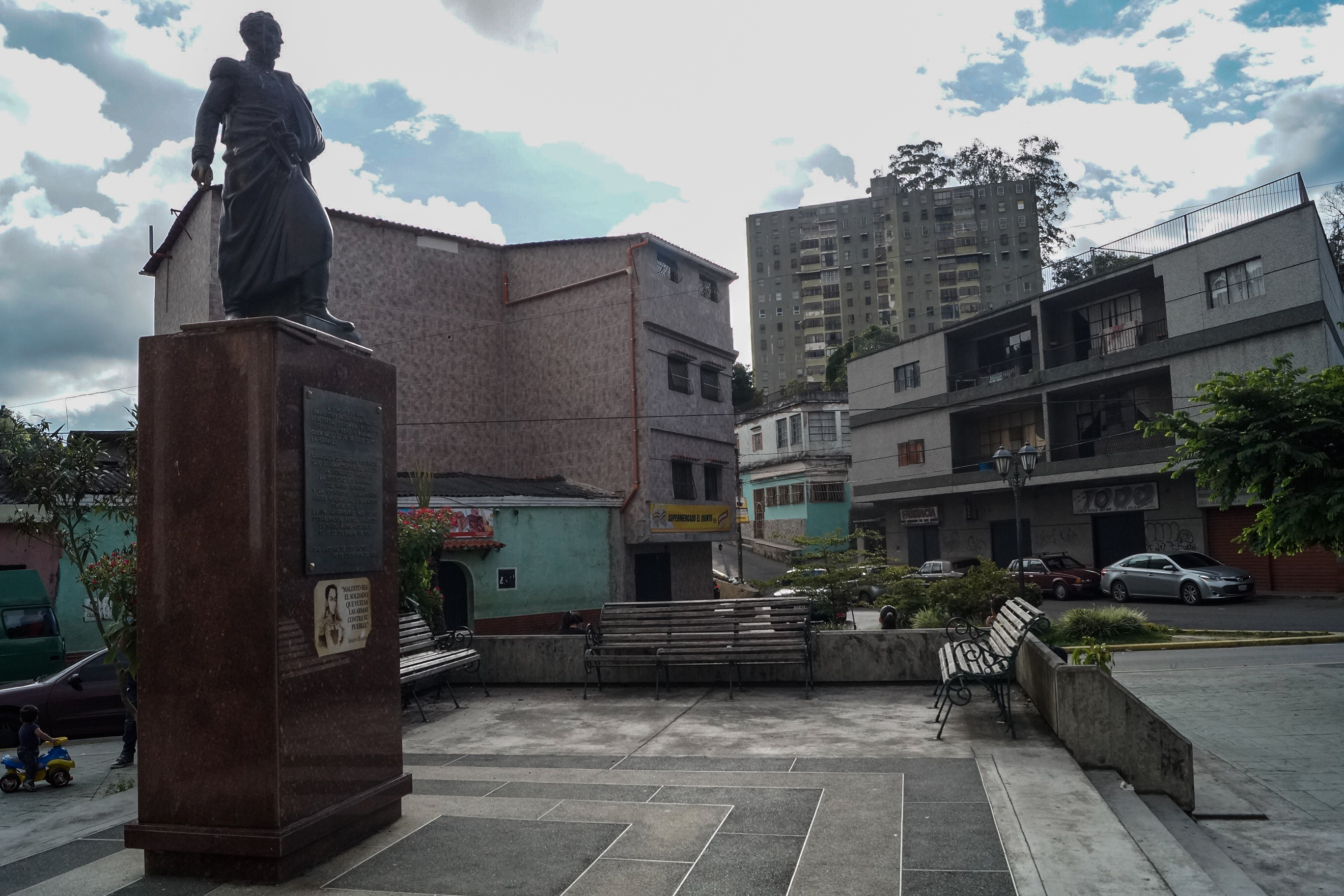

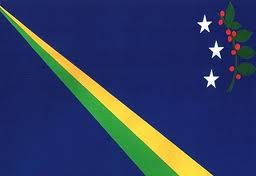
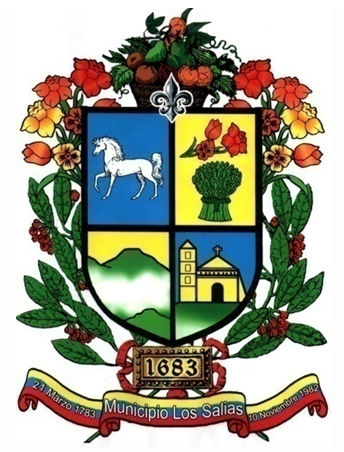
- Flag Coat of arms

- Location within Venezuela
- Coordinates: 10°22′28″N 66°58′01″W
- Country: Venezuela
- State: Miranda
- Municipality: Los Salias Municipality
- Founded: 1 May 1683

Area
  - Total: 51 km^{2} (20 sq mi)
- Elevation: 1,600 m (5,200 ft)

Population
  - Total: 74,422
  - Demonym: Sanantoñero/a
- Time zone: VST
- Postal code: 1204
- Area code: 0212
- Climate: Cwb

San Antonio de Los Altos is a suburban town, capital of Los Salias Municipality, Miranda State, Venezuela with a population of 68,255 in 2011. The town was named after Saint Anthony of Padua, a Portuguese Catholic priest, the patron saint of the city and the mountainous area around it.

== Geography ==
San Antonio de los Altos is part of the Altos Mirandinos Metropolitan Area, which is, in itself part of the Metropolitan Region of Caracas. It covers an area of about 55 km^{2} (21 sq mi) and has an average altitude of 1,300 metres (4,300 ft) above sea level. San Antonio is the highest point in the Altos Mirandinos area.
