= Jesús Muñoz Tébar =

Venezuelan politician (1847–1909)

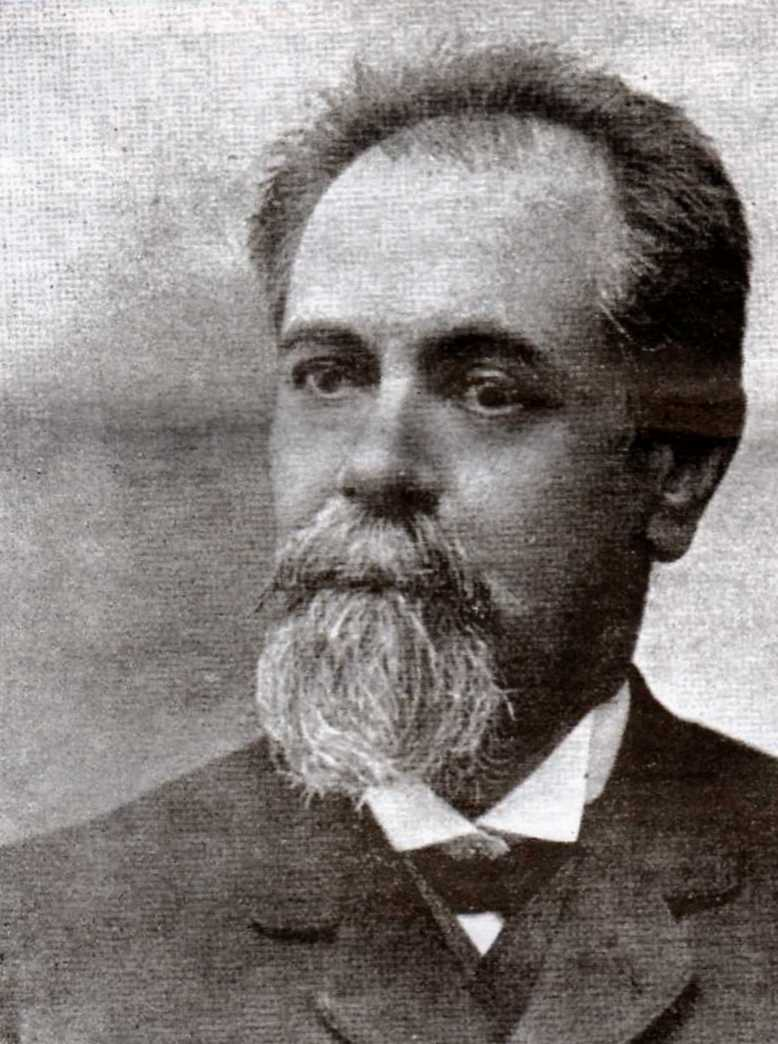
Jesús Muñoz Tébar

Jesús Muñoz Tébar (Caracas, 17 January 1847 – 21 September, 1909) was a Venezuelan engineer, soldier and politician, Minister of Public Works on five occasions during the government of Antonio Guzmán Blanco. He was the Minister of Finance from 1908 to 1909.

== Career ==
He studied in the Vargas School of Caracas and graduated from the Military Academy of Mathematics in 1866 with the rank of Lieutenant of Engineers. A trusted official of Guzmán Blanco, three times president of Venezuela, he was called at the time the “constructor of the guzmancismo". Under his tenure as minister of Public Works, the government developed the construction of roads, bridges and railways in an attempt to improve the quality of life of Venezuela, then a purely rural nation. In 1881 he finished the Municipal Theatre of Caracas whose construction was initiated in 1876 by the French architect Esteban Ricard, who had left the country in 1879.

He kept the Venezuelan government informed about British presence near the disputed border, leading to the rupture of diplomatic relations with the British government.

Muñoz Tébar was the rector of the Central University of Venezuela for two terms, and the institution awarded him a Doctorate in Philosophical Sciences.

In 1891 he published his book Personalismo y Legalismo, dedicated to pointing out the conditions of the region after independence, focusing in the need to improve the educational system to achieve sustainable development and consequently end the current despotism.

Muñoz Tébar died in Caracas on 21 September 1909.
