= Valentina Martínez (model) =

Venezuelan model and beauty pageant titleholder

Valentina Martínez Landkœr
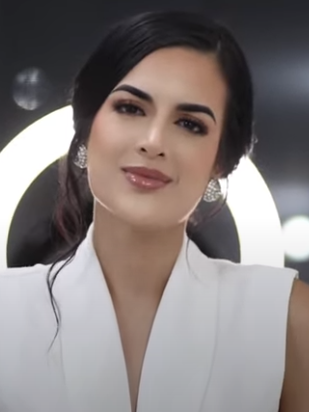
- Valentina Martínez Landkœr in 2023
- Born: Valentina del Pilar Martínez Landkœr; 9 March 2000 (age 26); Puerto La Cruz, Anzoátegui, Venezuela
- Occupations: Model; beauty pageant titleholder; journalist
- Height: 1.74 m (5 ft 8 1/2 in)
- Beauty pageant titleholder
- Title: Miss Grand Anzoátegui 2022; Miss Grand Venezuela 2022
- Major competitions: Miss Grand Venezuela 2022 (Winner); Miss Grand International 2023 (Unplaced); Miss Venezuela 2025 (Top 12)

Valentina del Pilar Martínez Landkœr (born 9 March 2000) is a Venezuelan model, journalist and beauty pageant titleholder who was crowned Miss Grand Venezuela 2022. She represented the state of Anzoátegui at the pageant. After winning the national contest, she participated in the Miss Grand International 2023 competition in Vietnam, but was unplaced.

== Life and career ==
=== Early life ===
As of 2023, Martínez was a systems engineering student at the Universidad Santa María in Barcelona, Anzoátegui. Martinez also has a bachelor's degree in Social Communications. Valentina is an active member of the Galician Center of Lechería.

== Pageantry ==
=== Miss Grand Venezuela 2022 ===
Martínez started her journey in the pageantry world by winning her first title as Miss Grand Anzoátegui 2021 representing the town of Píritu on December 14, 2021, at the Maremares Hotel Marina & Spa in Lecherías, Anzoátegui. She competed with 17 other delegates getting the Miss Popularity vote and the Best Face award.

Then she participated in the Miss Grand Venezuela 2022 competition held on August 13, 2022, at the Teatro Municipal of Caracas where she was finally crowned Miss Grand Venezuela 2022 by Vanessa Coello, Miss Grand Venezuela 2021.

Awards and achievements
| Preceded by Luiseth Materán | Miss Grand Venezuela; 2022 | Succeeded by Anna Blanco |
| Preceded by New title | Miss Grand Anzoátegui; 2022 | Succeeded by Silvana Lomonaco |
