= Paracotos =

- Coordinates: 10°16′N 66°57′W

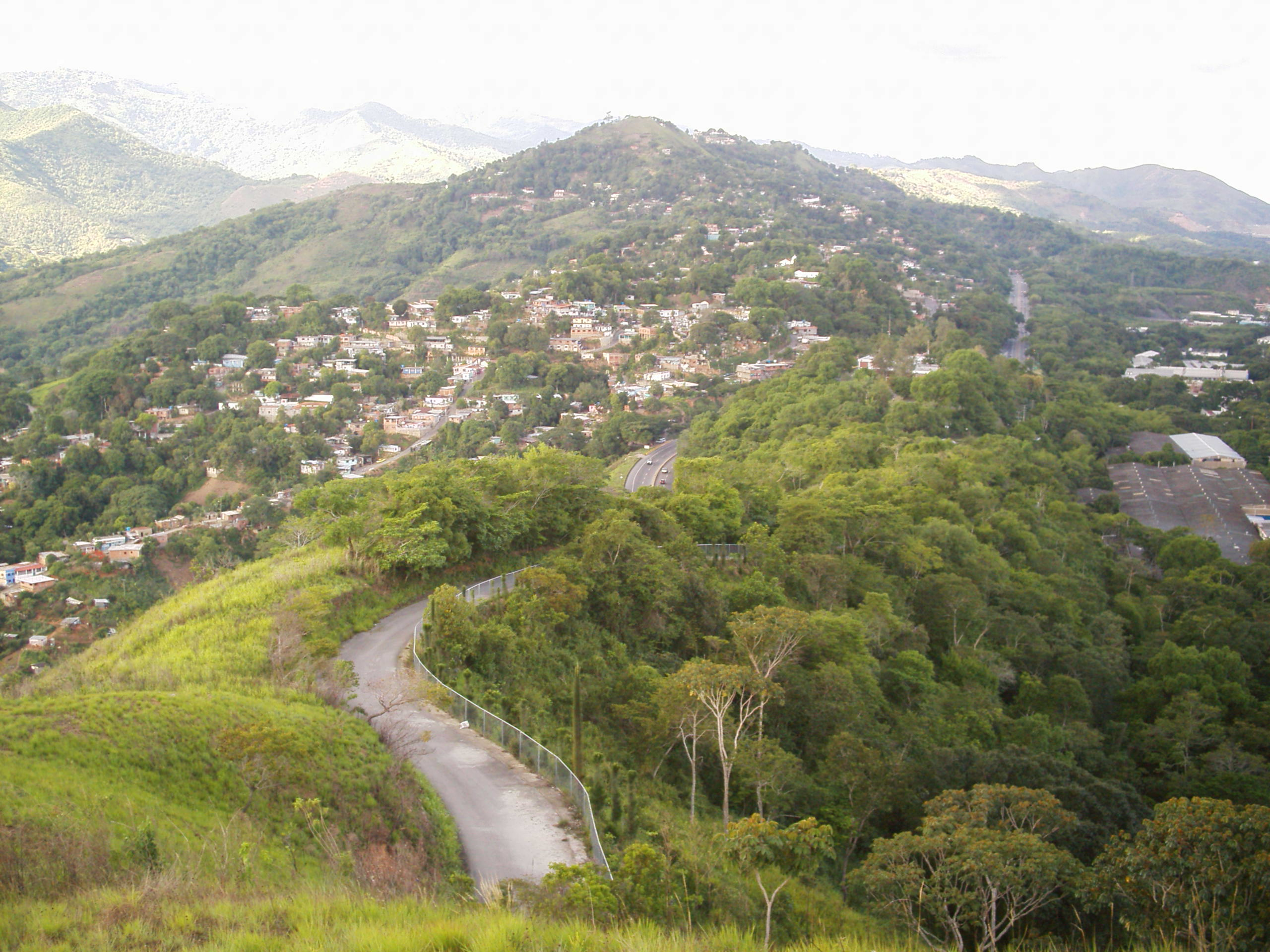
A panoramic view of the town of Paracotos

Paracotos is a town in Miranda State, Venezuela.
