= Miss Grand Venezuela 2024 =

2nd edition of the Miss Grand Venezuela competition

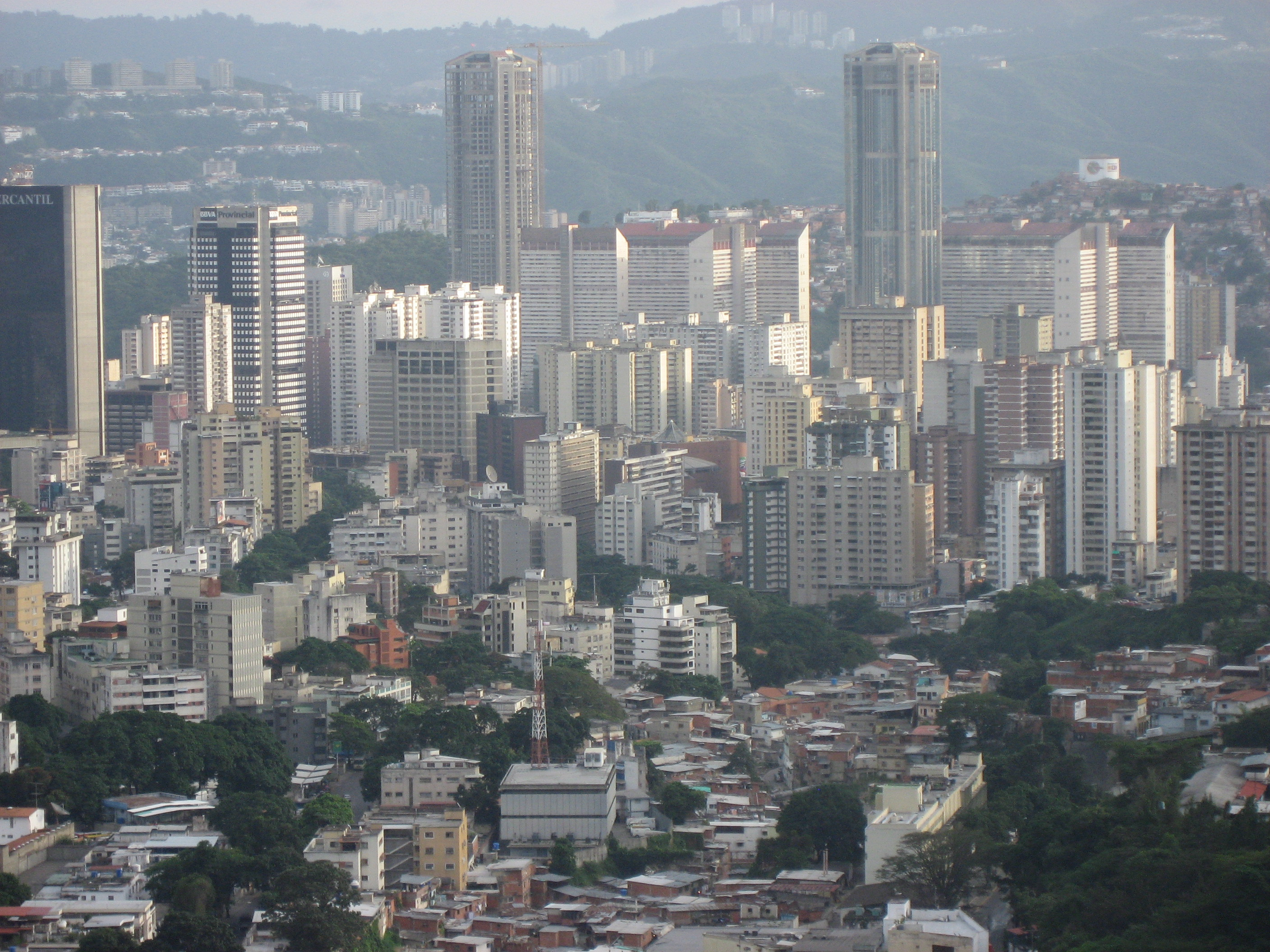
- Caracas, the host city of the contest
- Date: June 28, 2024
- Presenters: Vanessa Coello; Yanuaria Verde; Marián Pérez; Emmy Carrero
- Venue: Salon Venezuela, Circulo Militar, Caracas
- Broadcaster: YouTube
- Entrants: 18
- Placements: 12
- Winner: Tina Batson; Miranda

Miss Grand Venezuela 2024 was the second edition of the Miss Grand Venezuela pageant, held at the Salon Venezuela, Circulo Militar in Caracas, Venezuela, on June 28, 2024. Valentina Martínez of Anzoátegui crowned Tina Batson of Miranda as her successor at the end of the event.

Tina Batson was expected to represent the country in the Miss Grand International 2025 competition but resigned on 23 February 2025.

== Background ==
=== Location and date ===
After finishing the national contest of Miss Grand Venezuela 2022 in August 2022, the national director, George Wittles, began franchising the state pageant for the 2023 national contest to local organizers. According to José Gil, vice president of Miss Grand Zulia, the second edition of the Miss Grand Venezuela pageant was scheduled for November 2022. However, the pageant was postponed to 2024.

In late March 2024, the organizer announced on the official social media that the final competition of Miss Grand Venezuela 2024 was set for June 28, 2024, at Salon Venezuela, Circulo Militar in Caracas, where the country representative for the Miss Grand International 2025 will be elected, while the Venezuelan candidate for the 2024 international event will be chosen from another group of four aspirants through the closed-door interview.

=== Selection of contestants ===
Contestants for the Miss Grand Venezuela 2024 pageant were directly appointed by the state licensee or determined through the state pageants. Only five states organized their state-level contest for Miss Grand Venezuela 2024, as detailed below.

State pageants of Miss Grand Venezuela 2024, by the coronation date
Host state	Pageant	Edition	Date & venue	Entrants	Title(s)	Ref.
Anzoátegui	Miss Grand Anzoátegui	2nd	December 17, 2022, at the Teatro Cajigal, Barcelona	13	Miss Grand Anzoátegui	
Miranda	Señorita Fashion Venezuela	1st	December 21, 2022, at the Hotel Pestana Caracas, Chacao	20	Miss Grand Federal Dependencies	
Lara	Miss Grand Lara	1st	June 10, 2023, at the Hotel Trinitarias Suites, Barquisimeto	20	6 titles: Miss Grand Lara; Miss Grand Apure; Miss Grand Cojedes; Miss Grand Falcón; Miss Grand Santa Rosa de Lara; Miss Grand Yaracuy	
La Guaira	Miss Grand La Guaira	2nd	September 14, 2023, at the Bambú Beach Club, Macuto	8	Miss Grand La Guaira	
Portuguesa	Miss Grand Portuguesa	2nd	November 11, 2023, at the Casino WinStar, Acarigua	16	3 titles: Miss Grand Portuguesa; Miss Grand Barinas; Miss Grand Guárico	

== Results ==
=== Placements ===
Miss Grand Venezuela 2024 competition result by state
Color key:
Winner	1st RU	2nd RU
3rd RU	4th RU	5th RU
Top 12	Unplaced	Withdrew
No representative		RU = Runner-up

Placement	Contestant
Miss Grand Venezuela 2025	Miranda – Tina Batson
1st Runner-Up	Nueva Esparta – Andrea del Val
2nd Runner-Up	La Guaira – Camila Soto
3rd Runner-Up	Federal Dependencies – Shania Sleiman
4th Runner-Up	Yaracuy – Paola Marín
5th Runner-Up	Táchira – Helen Chacón
Top 12	Anzoátegui – Silvana Lomonaco; Cojedes – Enza de Luca; Falcón – Karen Dorante; Guárico – Fabiola Pérez; Lara – Amaybeth Zerpa; Monagas – Karem de Sousa

=== Designation ===
Anna Blanco got designated as Miss Grand Venezuela 2024, elected earlier through a closed-door interview, she got revealed at the event.

Title	Delegate
Miss Grand Venezuela 2024	Caracas – Anna Blanco

== Contestants ==
Eighteen contestants will compete for the title.

State	Contestant	Age	Hometown
Anzoátegui	Silvana Yaury Lomonaco León	23	Lechería
Aragua	Avril Valentina Anele Mijares Romero	18	La Victoria
Carabobo	Saray Sabariego Márquez	25	Puerto Cabello
Cojedes	Enza Anyelina Camacho de Luca	20	Barquisimeto
Distrito Capital	Adriana Gabriela Carreazo Mendoza	22	Caracas
Falcón	Karen Gabriela Dorante Hernández	22	Barquisimeto
Federal Dependencies	Shania Sleiman Rattia	23	Caracas
Guárico	Fabiana Paola Pérez	20	Acarigua
La Guaira	Camila Soto Gil	19	Caracas
Lara	Amaybeth Mariana Pérez Zerpa	23	Sanare
Miranda	Rocío Valentina Aguilarte Batson	25	Barcelona
Monagas	Karem Uriel De Sousa Quijada	19	Caracas
Nueva Esparta	Andrea Carolina Del Val Torres	27	Barquisimeto
Portuguesa	Danjilly Nicolle Gutiérrez González	19	Acarigua
Táchira	Helen Rachel Chacón Herrera	25	San Cristóbal
Trujillo	Mariby Dayana Delgado Matos	27	Valera
Yaracuy	Paola Lourdes Marín Linarez	26	Barquisimeto
Zulia	Victoria Alexandra Maneiro Montiel	20	Caracas
