= Mónica Spear =

Venezuelan beauty pageant titleholder (1984–2014)

- Spear in 2005
- Born: Mónica Spear Mootz; 1 October 1984; Maracaibo, Zulia, Venezuela
- Died: 6 January 2014 (aged 29); Puerto Cabello, Carabobo, Venezuela
- Education: University of Central Florida
- Beauty pageant titleholder
- Title: Miss Venezuela 2004
- Major competitions: Miss Venezuela 2004 (Winner); Miss Universe 2005 (4th Runner-Up)

Mónica Spear Mootz (1 October 1984 – 6 January 2014) was a Venezuelan actress, model and beauty pageant titleholder who won Miss Venezuela 2004. She represented Venezuela at Miss Universe 2005 in Bangkok, Thailand and finished as 4th runner-up. After her modeling career, she became a successful actress in Venezuelan telenovelas, and in the United States. Spear was murdered on 6 January 2014 along with her ex-husband, Thomas Berry, during a highway robbery while they vacationed in Venezuela with their five-year-old daughter, who survived the shooting. Spear's murder sparked a wave of anti-government protests in Venezuela over rising crime in Venezuela.

== Personal life ==
Mónica Spear Mootz was born to Rafael Spear Tudares and Ingeborg Mootz Gotera. Her maternal family emigrated from Germany, and her paternal family has English ancestry. Her father, Rafael, was a project engineer at Siemens Westinghouse. The family moved to Orlando, Florida in 2000 after her mother, Ingeborg, retired from her job with an oil company in Venezuela. She was a naturalized United States citizen, resident in Miami, Florida.

Spear began her studies in Florida as a chemical engineering major, before switching to theater on her father's advice. She was fluent in Spanish, English and French.

Spear married British businessman Thomas Henry Berry (whose nationality was later misidentified as Irish) in June 2008 and they had a daughter later that year. The couple divorced in 2012, but remained friendly, and at the time of their death in 2014, they were attempting to reconcile.

== Pageantry ==
=== Miss Venezuela 2004 ===
During the Miss Venezuela 2004 pageant, Spear won the national crown and represented Venezuela at Miss Universe 2005 in Thailand.

=== Miss Universe 2005 ===
Prior to being named the fourth runner-up in the Miss Universe 2004 pageant, Spear completed a bachelor's degree in theater from the University of Central Florida before returning to Venezuela to compete in the national pageant. Her participation in Miss Venezuela garnered notoriety when she was asked during the traditional "breakfast with press" the day after the pageant, because of her degree, which Venezuelan playwright she liked the most, to which she answered, "Gabriel García Márquez", a Colombian writer.

== Professional life ==
After modeling, Mother Agency Mariela Centeno, Spear became one of the most successful actresses in Venezuela for her main roles in telenovelas. Her first role as a protagonist was in the RCTV telenovela Mi Prima Ciela (My Cousin Ciela), in which she played a high-school student battling leukemia. The show was a success in Venezuela and other parts of South America, and it was televised in the US by TeleFutura. Spear held the starring role in Venevisión's telenovela La Mujer Perfecta in 2010, and later had a lead role in Flor Salvaje, a Spanish-language telenovela produced by the Miami-based television network Telemundo and RTI Producciones. She had lived in Miami since she began working for Telemundo.

Venezuelan channel Venevisión broadcast La Mujer Perfecta in honor of Spear and a foundation aid for people with Asperger syndrome. Same television special will Mónica Spear, led by the former Miss Venezuela, cheerleader and actress Mariangel Ruiz.

== Death ==
On 6 January 2014, Spear was in her native Venezuela on vacation with her ex-husband and their five-year-old daughter. While inside their car waiting for assistance after the vehicle had broken down on a highway in central Carabobo, Spear and her ex-husband were killed during an attempted robbery and their daughter shot and wounded in the leg. The police reported that the incident occurred around 9 or 10 p.m. It has been theorized that the couple resisted the robbery attempt.

On the initial suggestion that her former husband was Irish, the Irish Department of Foreign Affairs was investigating the incident. However, local police said he was travelling on a British passport. Spear's daughter has been in the care of her grandparents since her parents' death.

=== Protests ===
Spear's murder set off a wave of protests against the growing violence in Venezuela under Nicolás Maduro, the President of Venezuela. The international media highlighted the rising rate of crime in Venezuela, and the murder rate, which in 2014, was the second-highest in the world. One month after Spear's murder, another beauty pageant winner, Genesis Carmona, was killed by a shot to the head while protesting against the government in the same state as Spear. Maduro blamed soap operas for escalating crime in Venezuela.

=== Memorials ===
Telemundo re-ran shows that Spears had starred in; Venezuela's Televen cancelled a special that was to honor Spear "out of fear that the government would retaliate against the station", according to a spokesperson for the show.

=== Arrests and convictions ===
On 8 January 2014, seven people were arrested by the Cuerpo de Investigaciones Científicas, Penales y Criminalísticas (CICPC) for their alleged involvement in the murder. The suspects were José Ferreira Herrera (18), Jean Carlos Colina (19), Nelfrend Jiménez Álvarez (21), Alejandro Maldonado Pérez (21), Franklin Cordero Álvarez (28), Leonar Marcano Lugo (32) and Eva Armas Mejías (39). At the time of the arrest, the Venezuelan authorities also confiscated several items believed to have been owned by Spear and Berry.

After two years, six of the people that were involved in their murder had received sentences, including Gerardo José Contreras Álvarez, and Maldonado Pérez, Cordero Álvarez and Marcano Lugo, who each received sentences of 30 to 35 years. Colina, Ferreira Herrera and Jiménez Álvarez were each sentenced to at least 20 years in prison. Eva Armas Mejias received a 10-year sentence as an accomplice.

== Filmography ==
| Year | Project | Role | Notes |
|---|---|---|---|
| 2006 | El Desprecio | Tamara Campos | Recurring role |
| 2007 | Mi prima Ciela | Graciela Andreína Zambrano Ávila "La Ciela" | Lead role |
| 2009 | Calle luna, Calle sol | María Esperanza Rodríguez | Lead role |
| 2010 | Que el cielo me explique | Violetta Robles | Special participation |
| 2010–11 | La mujer perfecta | Micaela Gómez | Lead role |
| 2011–12 | Flor Salvaje | Amanda Monteverde | Lead role |
| 2013 | Pasión prohibida | Bianca Santillana | Lead role |

== Awards and nominations ==
| Year | Award | Category | Nominated work | Result |
|---|---|---|---|---|
| 2007 | Premios 2 de Oro | New actress of the year | El Desprecio | Won |
| 2008 | El Galardón del Universo del Espectáculo | Best young lead actress | Mi prima Ciela | Won |
| 2013 | Premios Tu Mundo | Favorite Lead Actress | Pasión prohibida | Nominated |

== See also ==
- List of Miss Venezuela titleholders
- List of Miss Venezuela Special Awards

Awards and achievements
| Preceded by (Trinidad and Tobago) Danielle Jones | Miss Universe 4th runner-up 2005 | Succeeded by (United States) Tara Conner |
| Preceded by Ana Karina Áñez | Miss Venezuela; 2004 | Succeeded by Jictzad Viña |
| Preceded by Marjorie Olivares | Miss Guárico; 2004 | Succeeded by Lorena Sánchez de León |
