= Nariman Battikha =

Venezuelan beauty pageant titleholder

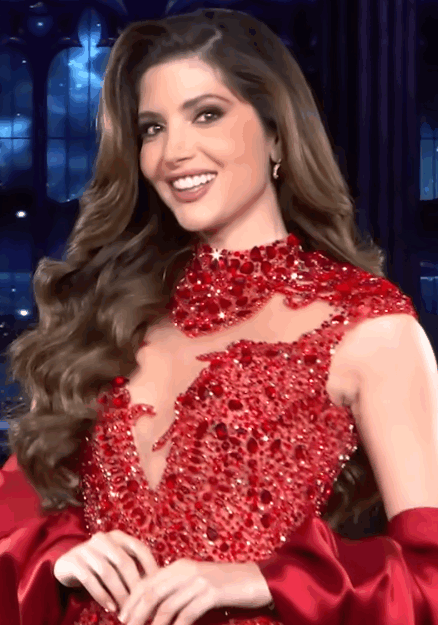
- Battikha in 2025
- Born: Maturín, Monagas, Venezuela
- Height: 1.80 m (5 ft 11 in)
- Beauty pageant titleholder
- Title: Miss Supranational Venezuela 2018; Reina Hispanoamericana 2018; Miss Grand Venezuela 2025
- Major competitions: Miss Venezuela 2017; (Top 10); Reina Hispanoamericana 2018; (Winner); Miss Supranational 2018; (Top 10); Miss Grand Venezuela 2025; (Winner); Miss Grand International 2025; (4th Runner-Up)

Nariman Battikha is a Venezuelan beauty pageant titleholder who won Reina Hispanoamericana 2018. Battikha also represented Portuguesa state at Miss Venezuela 2017, and was a semifinalist. She represented Venezuela in Miss Grand International 2025, and was fourth runner-up.

Battikha was previously Miss Supranational Venezuela 2018 and represented Venezuela at Miss Supranational 2018, where she reached the top 10.

== Life and career ==
=== Early life ===
Battikha was born in Maturín, Monagas, and is from a Syrian family. After finishing high school, she moved to the United States to learn English. Battikha has a degree in Business Economics from the Universidad Metropolitana in Caracas.

== Pageantry ==
Battikha's first pageant was Sambil Model Venezuela 2015, together with 11 other participants. In 2017, Battikha represented Portuguesa state, and reached the top 10 of Miss Venezuela 2017, held at the Venevisión studios, on November 9, 2017. She won the Miss Glamor award. Battikha represented Venezuela and won Reina Hispanoamericana 2018, on November 3, 2018, in Santa Cruz, Bolivia, She was crowned by her predecessor, Teresita Marquez of the Philippines. In May 2018, Battikha was appointed as the representative of Venezuela for Miss Supranational 2018. She reached the top 10, on December 7, 2018 at the Municipal Sports and Recreation Center MOSIR, in Malopolska, Krynica-Zdrój, Poland. Nariman received the Miss Photogenic Award.

In 2025, Nariman represented Monagas and won Miss Grand Venezuela 2025 on August 31, in Valencia, Venezuela. Representing Venezuela again, she was fourth runner up at Miss Grand International 2025, on October 18, 2025 at the MGI Hall, in Bangkok, Thailand.

Awards and achievements
Preceded by Teresita Marquez, Philippines	Reina Hispanoamericana; 2018	Succeeded by Regina Peredo, Mexico
Preceded by Geraldine Duque	Miss Supranational Venezuela; 2018	Succeeded by Gabriela de la Cruz
Preceded by Viviana Valente Rueda	Miss Portuguesa; 2017	Succeeded by Isabella Rodríguez
Preceded by Anna Blanco	Miss Grand Venezuela; 2025	Succeeded by Lady Di Mosquera
Preceded by Maria Felix, Dominican Republic	4th Runner up Miss Grand International; 2025	Succeeded by Emoura Phạm, Vietnam
