= Tina Batson =

Venezuelan beauty pageant titleholder

- Born: Rocío Valentina Aguilarte Batson; 16 May 1999 (age 27); Barcelona, Venezuela
- Beauty pageant titleholder
- Title: Miss Grand Venezuela 2024 (Resigned); Miss Cosmo Venezuela 2025; Miss Earth Venezuela 2026
- Years active: 2024–present
- Major competitions: Miss Grand Venezuela 2024 (Winner); Miss Cosmo 2025 (Unplaced); Miss Earth 2026 (TBD)

Rocío Valentina Aguilarte Batson known as Tina Batson, is a Venezuelan beauty pageant titleholder who won Miss Grand Venezuela 2024 on June 28, 2024, at the Caracas Military Circle in Caracas. She was to represent Venezuela at Miss Grand International 2025 in Thailand, but later resigned her title due to financial issues.

Batson was appointed as Miss Earth Venezuela 2026 to represent Venezuela at Miss Earth 2026.

== Pageantry ==
In 2022 Batson was first runner-up at Miss Anzoátegui 2022, which allowed her to compete at Miss Venezuela 2022. Batson won Miss Grand Venezuela 2024 held on June 28, 2024, competing against 17 other candidates Batson advocated for mental health awareness and youth empowerment throughout her campaign. Batson was to represent Venezuela at Miss Grand International 2025 in Thailand, but later resigned her title due to financial issues.

Awards and achievements
Preceded by Roziel Borges	Miss Earth Venezuela; 2026	Succeeded by Incumbent
Preceded by Zaren Loyo	Miss Cosmo Venezuela; 2025	Succeeded by Incumbent
Preceded by Anna Blanco	Miss Grand Venezuela; 2024	Succeeded by Nariman Battikha
Preceded by China Zhou Yibing	4th Runner-up Miss Teen International; 2018	Succeeded by Argentina Graciela Salguiero
