= Emmarys Pinto =

Venezuelan model (born 1986)

Emmarys Diliana Pinto Peralta (born May 15, 1986 in Araure) is a Venezuelan model and beauty pageant titleholder who won the Miss Intercontinental contest held in Huangshan, China on July 30, 2005. She was Miss Lara in the Miss Venezuela 2004 pageant and placed in the 10 semifinalists.
