= Miss Grand Venezuela 2022 =

1st edition of the Miss Grand Venezuela competition

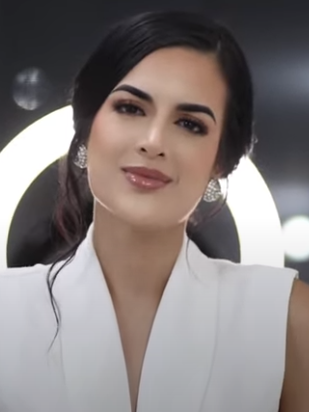
- Valentina Martínez, the winner of the contest
- Date: August 13, 2022
- Presenters: Leo Aldana, Yanuaria Verde, and Vanessa Coello
- Venue: Teatro Municipal of Caracas, Capital District, Venezuela
- Broadcaster: Grand TV
- Entrants: 22
- Placements: 16
- Winner: Valentina Martínez (Anzoátegui)
- Congeniality: Valentina Martínez (Anzoátegui)
- Photogenic: Sylvana Michelle Carmona (Carabobo)

External videos
- Grand final coronation

Miss Grand Venezuela 2022 was the first edition of the Miss Grand Venezuela beauty pageant, held at Teatro Municipal of Caracas in the Capital District on 13 August 2022. Twenty-two national delegates, chosen through various state pageants, participated in the contest, of which, Valentina Martínez of Anzoátegui was named the winner and was crowned by Vanessa Coello Miss Grand Venezuela 2021, she will later represent the country at Miss Grand International 2023, which was scheduled to be held in October 2023 in Vietnam.

In addition to crowning the winner, the country representative for the 10th-anniversary edition of Miss Grand International, Sabrina Deraneck of Mérida, was also revealed; Deraneck had been elected the first runner-up at another national pageant, 2022 El Concurso by Osmel Sousa, and was later appointed the country representative by the Venezuelan Miss Grand licensee, George Wittles. However, in early September – one month before the commencement of the international tournament, Deraneck resigned the title due to health problems, caused the organizer to assign Luiseth Materán Miss Universe Venezuela 2021 as the replacement.

The grand final round of the pageant was hosted by Vanessa Coello, Leo Aldana, and Yanuaria Verde; and was beamed live to a virtual audience worldwide via the pageant YouTube channel, named GrandTV-VE. Originally, the winner of the competition was expected to participate at the Miss Grand International 2022 but the organizer later decided to appoint a new country representative for such an international event and planned to send this edition winner to the 2023 competition in Vietnam instead.

== Background ==
=== History ===
After hosting the Miss Grand International 2019 pageant, the licensee of the national pageant in Venezuela was transferred to the Venezuelan jewelry designer, George Wittles, who has also acted as the crown sponsor for the Miss Grand International since 2019. Wittles planned to conduct the first Miss Grand Venezuela contest in 2021 by distributing the regional license to state organizers to select their representatives for such a national contest, however, due to the COVID-19 pandemic, the pageant was instead postponed to July 2022 and then to August.

=== Selection of contestants ===
The national aspirants for the Miss Grand Venezuela 2022 pageant were chosen through the state pageants held by several local licensees, who in some cases are responsible for more than one state, such as the state pageant organized in Táchira, Miss Grand Los Andes; four state representatives were determined through such the contest, moreover, one of its finalists was later designated to represent the neighboring state due to a lacking of state licensee. However, some delegates, such as the representative of Lara, Nueva Esparta, Sucre, and Zulia, were appointed state or regional titles because of the absence of a state pageant in their area.

Map shows states that held the state pageant for Miss Grand Venezuela 2022
Colors key for the number of titles qualified for the national pageant:

State pageant

5 titles
3 titles
2 titles
1 title

Others

State casting with 1 state title
No pageant held in state

State pageants/casting of Miss Grand Venezuela 2022, by the coronation date
Location	Type	Date & venue	Entrants	Title for the national round	Ref.
Guárico	Pageant	26 June 2021 at Aprolegua de Valle de la Pascua, Leonardo Infante	18	Miss Grand Guárico	
Táchira	Pageant	31 August 2021 at Arminio Gutiérrez Castro Indoor Gymnasium, San Cristóbal	20	Miss Grand Táchira; Miss Grand Barinas; Miss Grand Mérida; Miss Grand Trujillo; Miss Grand Amazonas^{[α]}	
Portuguesa	Pageant	4 September 2021 at Oryzagua Grand Hall, Hotel GEO Inn, Araure	18	Miss Grand Portuguesa; Miss Grand Cojedes^{[α]}	
Capital District	Pageant	15 November 2021 at Garden of Casa Versalles, San Bernardino, Libertador	12	Miss Grand Distrito Capital; Miss Grand Miranda^{[α]}	
Anzoátegui	Pageant	14 December 2021 at Maremares Hotel Marina & Spa, Lechería	18	Miss Grand Anzoátegui	
Bolívar	Pageant	22 April 2022 at Centro Portugués Venezolano de Guayana, Guayana	28	Miss Grand Bolívar	
La Guaira	Pageant	22 April 2022 at Eurobuilding Hotel Maiquetía, Vargas	11	Miss Grand La Guaira; Miss Grand Federal Dependencies^{[α]}; Miss Grand Monagas^{[α]}	
Aragua	Pageant	28 April 2022 at Festejos Da Luigi, C.A. Quinta Gran Gala, Maracay	20	Miss Grand Aragua	
Carabobo	Casting	29 May 2022 at WTC Hesperia Valencia, Valencia	—N/a	Miss Grand Carabobo	
Falcón	Pageant	25 June 2022 at Gran Salón C.C Ciudad del Viento, Punto Fijo	7	Miss Grand Falcón	
Note: 1. ^α The representative was originally finished as one of the finalists at the state pageant but later designated to such a title.

== Results summary ==
=== Main placement ===
Miss Grand Venezuela 2022 competition result
Position	Delegate
Miss Grand Venezuela 2022	Anzoátegui – Valentina Martínez
1st runner-up	Barinas – Delia Santander
2nd runner-up	Táchira – Iraima Castillo
3rd runner-up	La Guaira – Valeria Camacho
4th runner-up	Mérida – Valeria Cárdenas
Top 12	Amazonas – María José Pernía; Bolívar – Indira Zaraza Cordero; Guárico – Marian Pérez; Nueva Esparta – Alia Abized; Portuguesa – Zuly Nicols; Sucre – Genesis Bartholome; Zulia – Neilenys Cervantes
Top 16	Capital District – Daniela Durán; Carabobo – Sylvana Michelle Carmona; Lara – Alejandra Ríos; Miranda – Ivana Valsint

=== Supplementary title ===
Position	Delegate
Miss Elite Venezuela 2022	Nueva Esparta – Alia Abized
1st runner-up	Capital District – Daniela Durán
2nd runner-up	Sucre – Genesis Bartholome

=== Special awards ===
Award	Delegate
Miss Photogenic	Carabobo – Sylvana Michelle Carmona
Miss Congenialily	Anzoátegui – Valentina Martínez
Best Body	Táchira – Paola Castillo
Best Catwalk	Portuguesa – Zuly Alvarado
Best Elegance	Lara – Alejandra Ríos
Best Face	Barinas – Delia Santander
Queen of TikTok	Capital District – Daniela Durán

Miss Grand Venezuela 2022 competition result by states

Colors key
Winner	Third runner-up	Top 16
First runner-up	Fourth runner-up	Unplaced
Second runner-up	Top 12	Did not participate

== Candidates ==
State	Contestant	Age	Height	Ref.
Amazonas	María José Pernía	25	1.74 m (5 ft 8 1/2 in)	
Anzoátegui	Valentina Martínez	22	1.74 m (5 ft 8 1/2 in)	
Aragua	Daniellys Ojeda Ramírez	24	1.74 m (5 ft 8 1/2 in)	
Barinas	Delia Santander	20	1.72 m (5 ft 7 1/2 in)	
Bolívar	Indira Zaraza Cordero	23	1.82 m (5 ft 11 1/2 in)	
Capital District	Daniela Durán	25	1.67 m (5 ft 5 1/2 in)	
Carabobo	Sylvana Michelle Carmona	26	1.72 m (5 ft 7 1/2 in)	
Cojedes	Valentina Bonalde	20	1.70 m (5 ft 7 in)	
Falcón	Gisselle Dos Santos	18	1.72 m (5 ft 7 1/2 in)	
Federal Dependencies	Dariana Pacheco Romero	21	1.78 m (5 ft 10 in)	
Guárico	Marian Pérez	22	1.74 m (5 ft 8 1/2 in)	
La Guaira	Valeria Camacho	17	1.79 m (5 ft 10 1/2 in)	
Lara	Alejandra Ríos	21	1.72 m (5 ft 7 1/2 in)	
Mérida	Valeria Cárdenas	19	1.75 m (5 ft 9 in)	
Miranda	Ivana Valsint	22	1.68 m (5 ft 6 in)	
Monagas	Mayra Carrillo	20	1.83 m (6 ft 0 in)	
Nueva Esparta	Alia Abized	19	1.80 m (5 ft 11 in)	
Portuguesa	Zuly Alvarado	22	1.77 m (5 ft 9 1/2 in)	
Sucre	Genesis Bartholome	24	1.78 m (5 ft 10 in)	
Táchira	Paola Castillo	26	1.74 m (5 ft 8 1/2 in)	
Trujillo	Johanna Villamizar	22	1.74 m (5 ft 8 1/2 in)	
Zulia	Neilenys Cervantes	19	1.80 m (5 ft 11 in)	

Replacement

- Guárico: Betzy Capicciotti resigned her state title, six months after winning the state pageant on 26 June 2021 for undisclosed reasons, caused the state licensee to appoint Marian Pérez, the fourth runner-up, to participate in the national pageant instead.
