= Miss Venezuela 2019 =

66th edition of the Miss Venezuela competition

- Date: August 1, 2019
- Presenters: Henrys Silva; Fanny Otatti; José Andres Padrón; Mariem Velazco
- Entertainment: Daniela Barranco; Omar Koonze
- Venue: Estudio 1 de Venevisión, Caracas, Venezuela
- Broadcaster: Venevisión; Venevision Plus; DirecTV
- Entrants: 24
- Placements: 10
- Winner: Thalía Olvino; Delta Amacuro
- Congeniality: Rashell Delgado (Miranda)
- Photogenic: Luz Ledezma (Apure)

Miss Venezuela 2019 was the 66th Miss Venezuela pageant, held at the Estudio 5 de Venevisión in Caracas, Venezuela, on August 1, 2019.

Isabella Rodríguez of Portuguesa crowned Thalía Olvino of Delta Amacuro as her successor at the end of the event. Thalia represented Venezuela at Miss Universe 2019 and made into Top 20, while Melissa Jiménez, from Zulia, who was crowned Miss International Venezuela 2019 by Mariem Velazco, Miss International 2018, competed at Miss International 2019 and made into Top 15.

== Results ==
=== Placements ===
Color key

- Declared as Winner
- Ended as Runner-up
- Ended as one of the Finalists or Semi-finalists

Placement	Contestant	International Placement
Miss Venezuela 2019	Delta Amacuro – Thalía Olvino	Top 20
Miss Venezuela International 2019	Zulia – Melissa Jiménez	Top 15
1st Runner-Up	Apure – Luz María Ledezma	
2nd Runner-Up (Miss Grand Venezuela 2021)	Monagas – Vanessa Coello	Top 10
3rd Runner-Up (Miss Earth Venezuela 2022)	Distrito Capital – Oriana Pablos	Unplaced
Top 10	Anzoátegui – María Fernanda Franceschi; Lara – Verónica Dugarte; Mérida – Alessandra Sánchez; Miranda – Rashell Delgado; Yaracuy – Karla Hurtado	

== Contestants ==
Contestants from all 23 states and the Capital District of the country will compete for the title.

State	Contestant	Age	Height (cm)	Hometown
Amazonas	Paola Alejandra Salas Ortega	26	1.81 m (5 ft 11 in)	Puerto La Cruz
Anzoátegui	María Fernanda Franceschi Neves	25	1.76 m (5 ft 9 in)	Barcelona
Apure	Luz María Ledezma Navarro	20	1.80 m (5 ft 11 in)	Valle de la Pascua
Aragua	Nathaly Katherine Flores Mendoza	24	1.76 m (5 ft 9 in)	La Victoria
Barinas	Liliana Karina Gonçalves Matos	23	1.80 m (5 ft 11 in)	Caracas
Bolívar	Marioxy Gabriela Aranguren Castellano	19	1.78 m (5 ft 10 in)	Caracas
Carabobo	Vanessa Carolina Pinto Díaz	24	1.78 m (5 ft 10 in)	Valencia
Cojedes	Hirmar José Figueredo Machado	20	1.78 m (5 ft 10 in)	El Pao
Delta Amacuro	Lulyana Thalía Olvino Torres	20	1.78 m (5 ft 10 in)	Valencia
District Capital	Oriana Gabriela Pablos Díaz	22	1.74 m (5 ft 9 in)	Caracas
Falcón	María José Bracho Barrios	23	1.79 m (5 ft 10 in)	Maracaibo
Guárico	María Betania Bracho Montenegro	24	1.80 m (5 ft 11 in)	Valle de la Pascua
Lara	Verónica Carolina Dugarte Riera	22	1.80 m (5 ft 11 in)	Barquisimeto
Mérida	Alessandra María Chiara Sánchez Cardola	19	1.78 m (5 ft 10 in)	Caracas
Miranda	Martha Rashell Delgado Dinnocenzzo	19	1.78 m (5 ft 10 in)	Charallave
Monagas	Vanessa Carolina Coello Coraspe	23	1.78 m (5 ft 10 in)	Maturín
Nueva Esparta	Claudia Isabel Marín Fernández	19	1.82 m (6 ft 0 in)	Porlamar
Portuguesa	Carla Paola González Guevara	20	1.74 m (5 ft 9 in)	Caracas
Sucre	Inés Carolina Simancas Vargas	20	1.75 m (5 ft 9 in)	Caracas
Táchira	Victoria Eugenia Galeazzi Casique	21	1.72 m (5 ft 8 in)	San Cristóbal
Trujillo	Bellini Alejandra Hernández Cedeño	19	1.84 m (6 ft 0 in)	Caracas
Vargas	Stephanie Del Valle Pérez Mata	24	1.80 m (5 ft 11 in)	Macuto
Yaracuy	Karla Marina Hurtado Sánchez	25	1.85 m (6 ft 1 in)	Valencia
Zulia	Melissa Ester Jiménez Guevara	20	1.74 m (5 ft 9 in)	Maracaibo
