= Alix Sosa =

Venezuelan model and beauty pageant titleholder

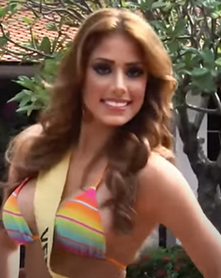
- Alix Sosa in 2014
- Born: Alix Dayana Sosa González; December 3, 1988 (age 37); Caracas, Venezuela
- Height: 1.74 m (5 ft 9 in)
- Beauty pageant titleholder
- Title: Miss Bolívar Mundo 2013; Miss Grand Venezuela 2014
- Hair color: Brown
- Eye color: Brown
- Major competitions: Miss Grand Venezuela 2014 (Winner); Miss Grand International 2014 (Top 20)

Alix Dayana Sosa González (born December 3, 1988, in Caracas, Venezuela) is a Venezuelan model and beauty pageant titleholder. She won the title of Miss Grand Venezuela 2014 and was a participant of Miss World Venezuela in 2013, representing Bolívar State. She represented Venezuela in the Miss Grand International 2014 in Bangkok, Thailand.

== Biography and personal life ==
Alix was born in the Venezuelan capital, of Caracas. She graduated with a bachelor's degree in Customs and Foreign Trade, from the Escuela de Hacienda Pública in Caracas and she got a minor in International Negotiations from the same university. Her parents died when she was just a girl. Her mother, Nancy Margarita Gonzalez, was a specialist in Tourism and Hospitality (she died in May 1996) and her father, Claudio César Sosa, looked after her during her teenage years (he died in April 2009). During her childhood and teenage years she stayed in Caracas. At this time she made small appearances as a model. She gained inspiration from her Aunt Gina Sosa and two brothers, Leonardo and Alejandro, as they were her only immediate family. Later she became interested in beauty contests, so she participated in the first edition of Chica HTV in 2011. She also participated in Miss Venezuela World 2013 representing the Bolívar State. In Venezuela she has participated in runaways with top designers. After her participation representing Venezuela in the Miss Grand International 2014 in Bangkok, Thailand she has continued her career internationally from her new area of residence, South Florida in the United States.

== Miss Venezuela World ==
She represented the Bolívar State in Miss Venezuela World competition held on August 10, 2013. There she was the 6th finalist. On that occasion, the crowned contestant, Karen Soto won Miss Venezuela World 2013.

== Miss Grand International ==
As part of her responsibilities as Miss Grand Venezuela, she had the right to represent the country in the 2nd edition of Miss Grand International which was held on October 7, 2014, in Bangkok, Thailand. Sosa competed with about 90 candidates from different countries and autonomous territories. The predecessor of her, Mariana Jiménez later became Miss Venezuela 2014.

Awards and achievements
Preceded by Mariana Jiménez	Miss Grand Venezuela; 2014	Succeeded by Reina Rojas
