= Miss Venezuela 2004 =

51st edition of the Miss Venezuela competition

- Date: September 23, 2004
- Presenters: Daniel Sarcos; Maite Delgado; Carmen Victoria Pérez
- Entertainment: Luis Fonsi; Alicia Machado
- Venue: Poliedro de Caracas, Caracas, Venezuela
- Broadcaster: Venevision
- Entrants: 28
- Placements: 10
- Winner: Mónica Spear; Guárico
- Congeniality: Barbara Clara (Amazonas)
- Photogenic: Andrea Gómez (Distrito Capital)
- Miss Internet: Inmary Rodríguez (Cojedes)

Miss Venezuela 2004 was the fifty-first Miss Venezuela pageant, held at the Poliedro de Caracas in Caracas, Venezuela, on September 23, 2004.

Ana Karina Añez of Lara crowned Mónica Spear of Guárico as her successor at the end of the event.

== Results ==
=== Placements ===
Placement	Contestant
Miss Venezuela 2004	Guárico – Mónica Spear †
Miss Venezuela World 2004	Trujillo – Andrea Milroy
Miss Venezuela International 2004	Distrito Capital – Andrea Gómez
1st Runner-Up	Miranda – Stephanie Thomas
2nd Runner-Up	Amazonas – Bárbara Clara
Top 10	Carabobo – Desirée Pallotta; Delta Amacuro – Jéssika Grau; Lara – Emmarys Pinto; Sucre – Julene Recao; Zulia – Anabel Montiel

=== Special awards ===
- Miss Photogenic (voted by press reporters) - Andrea Gómez (Miss Distrito Capital)
- Miss Internet (voted by www.missvenezuela.com viewers) - Inmary Rodríguez (Miss Cojedes)
- Miss Popularity (voted by SMS Messages) - Anabel Montiel (Miss Zulia)
- Miss Congeniality (voted by Miss Venezuela contestants) - Bárbara Clara (Miss Amazonas)
- Miss Personality - Bárbara Clara (Miss Amazonas)
- Best Body - Mónica Spear (Miss Guárico)†
- Best Smile - Emmarys Pinto (Miss Lara)
- Miss Figure - Stephanie Thomas (Miss Miranda)
- Miss Elegance - Andrea Milroy (Miss Trujillo)
- Best Face - Andrea Milroy (Miss Trujillo)
- Best Skin - Alexandra Butler (Miss Monagas)
- Best Hair - Andrea Gómez (Miss Distrito Capital)

== Contestants ==
The Miss Venezuela 2004 delegates are:

State	Contestant	Age	Height	Hometown
Amazonas	Bárbara Clara Pereira	23	179 cm (5 ft 10 1/2 in)	Maturín
Anzoátegui	María Magdalena Alfaro Lunar †	19	174 cm (5 ft 8 1/2 in)	Puerto La Cruz
Apure	Joelin Chiquinquirá Paredes Santiago	21	174 cm (5 ft 8 1/2 in)	Maracaibo
Aragua	Jessica María Jardim Lino	23	179 cm (5 ft 10 1/2 in)	Maracay
Barinas	Krysthen Karla Kurman Cabrera	21	176 cm (5 ft 9 1/2 in)	Valencia
Bolívar	Widmarú del Valle Calma Goudet	23	177 cm (5 ft 9 1/2 in)	Ciudad Guayana
Canaima	Mariela Isabel López González	23	174 cm (5 ft 8 1/2 in)	Maracaibo
Carabobo	Desireé Virginia Pallotta Peña	20	176 cm (5 ft 9 1/2 in)	Valencia
Cojedes	Inmary Milagro Rodríguez Boscán	22	170 cm (5 ft 7 in)	Maracaibo
Costa Oriental	Desireé del Carmen Cueva González	17	175 cm (5 ft 9 in)	Cabimas
Delta Amacuro	Jessika Concepción Grau Blequett	24	175 cm (5 ft 9 in)	Caracas
Dependencias Federales	Leonor Carolina Suárez Lemmo	18	177 cm (5 ft 9 1/2 in)	Caracas
Distrito Capital	María Andrea Gómez Vásquez	19	177 cm (5 ft 9 1/2 in)	Mérida
Falcón	Anny Vanessa del Río Molina	20	174 cm (5 ft 8 1/2 in)	Barquisimeto
Guárico	Mónica Spear Mootz †	19	178 cm (5 ft 10 in)	Maracaibo
Lara	Emmarys Diliana Pinto Peralta	18	174 cm (5 ft 8 1/2 in)	Araure
Mérida	Mariette Daniela Gamra Di Stefano	17	170 cm (5 ft 7 in)	Mérida
Miranda	Stephanie Shena Thomas Arthur	18	175 cm (5 ft 9 in)	Caracas
Monagas	Alexandra Valentina Butler Delgado-Chalbaud	19	178 cm (5 ft 10 in)	Caracas
Nueva Esparta	Nathalia Carolina Sánchez Castillejos	19	178 cm (5 ft 10 in)	Anaco
Península Goajira	Elice Karina Vizcaya Molero	17	179 cm (5 ft 10 1/2 in)	Maracaibo
Portuguesa	Christine maria Aschl Wimmer	18	178 cm (5 ft 10 in)	Acarigua
Sucre	Julene Isabel Recao Larrea	23	178 cm (5 ft 10 in)	Caracas
Táchira	Verónica Loschi Carrascal	18	175 cm (5 ft 9 in)	San Antonio del Táchira
Trujillo	Andrea María Milroy Díaz	20	176 cm (5 ft 9 1/2 in)	Caracas
Vargas	Daniela Monserrat Pla Henríquez	18	178 cm (5 ft 10 in)	Caracas
Yaracuy	Isabella Leticia Gámez Acevedo	19	176 cm (5 ft 9 1/2 in)	Caracas
Zulia	Anabel Cristina Montiel Galuppo	20	180 cm (5 ft 11 in)	Maracaibo

Notes

- Mónica Spear placed as 4th runner-up Miss Universe 2005 in Bangkok, Thailand.
- Andrea Gómez placed as semifinalist in Miss International 2005 in Tokyo, Japan.
- Emmarys Pinto won Miss Intercontinental 2005 in Huangshan, China.
- Bárbara Clara previously won Miss Italia Nel Mondo 2000 in Salsomaggiore, Italy.
- Stephanie Thomas placed as semifinalist in Top Model of the World 2004 in Karlsruhe, Germany.
- Julene Recao placed as finalist in Miss Mesoamérica 2004 in Houston, Texas, United States.
- Desireé Pallotta previously placed as 3rd runner up in Top Model of the World 2003 in Aachen, Germany.
- Jessica Jardim previously placed as 4th runner up in Miss Tourism World 2003 in Valencia, Venezuela.
