= Carrizal Municipality =

Carrizal Municipality Municipio Carrizal
- Municipality
- Flag Coat of arms

- Location in Miranda

- Location in Venezuela
- Coordinates: 10°21′01″N 66°59′53″W
- Country: Venezuela
- State: Miranda
- Municipal seat: Carrizal[*]

Government
  - Mayor: Jennifer Mujica Chachati (PSUV)

Area
  - Total: 23.9 km^{2} (9.2 sq mi)

Population (2007)
  - Total: 52,224
  - Density: 2,190/km^{2} (5,660/sq mi)
- Time zone: UTC−4 (VET)
- Area code(s): 0232
- Website: Official website

Carrizal is one of the 21 municipalities (municipios) that makes up the Venezuelan state of Miranda and, according to a 2007 population estimate by the National Institute of Statistics of Venezuela, the municipality has a population of 52,224. The town of Carrizal is the municipal seat of the Carrizal Municipality.

== Demographics ==
The Carrizal Municipality, according to a 2007 population estimate by the National Institute of Statistics of Venezuela, has a population of 52,224 (up from 44,431 in 2000). This amounts to 1.8% of the state's population. The municipality's population density is 1,632 inhabitants per square kilometre (4,230/sq mi).

== Government ==
Since 2017, the mayor of the city is Farith Fraija, after winning the municipal elections widely against José Luis Rodríguez, who ruled the municipality after replacing Orlando Urdaneta in 2002, shortly after a special election.
