= Anna Blanco =

Venezuelan beauty pageant titleholder

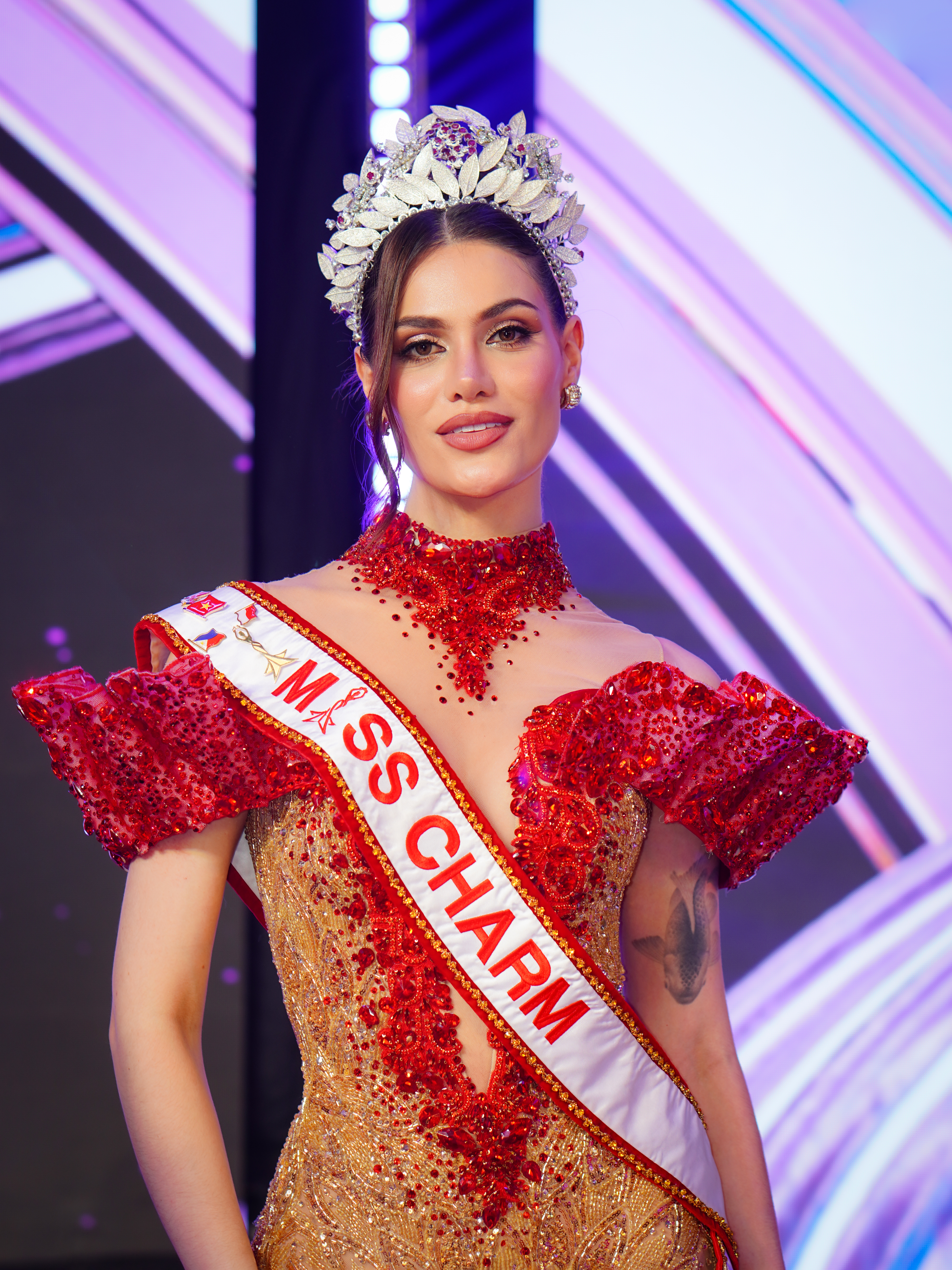
- Blanco in 2026
- Born: 29 December 1999 (age 26); Caracas, Venezuela
- Height: 1.82 m (6 ft 0 in)
- Beauty pageant titleholder
- Title: El Concurso by Osmel Sousa 2023; Miss Grand Venezuela 2024; Miss Charm 2025
- Major competitions: El Concurso by Osmel Sousa 2023; (Winner); Miss Grand International 2024; (Unplaced); Miss Charm 2025; (Winner)

Anna Blanco Flores (born 29 December 1999) is a Venezuelan beauty pageant titleholder who won Miss Charm 2025. She is the first Venezuelan to win Miss Charm.

== Life and career ==
Anna Blanco Flores was born 29 December 1999 in Caracas, Venezuela. She is a vocalist and singer-songwriter, and studied popular music performance in Canada.

== Pageantry ==
Blanco entered and won the third season of El Concurso by Osmel Sousa released in 2023, representing the state of Trujillo. On January 18, 2024, Blanco was to compete at Miss Charm 2024, to be held in Vietnam, but withdrew. She won Miss Grand Venezuela 2024 on June 28, 2024, at the Salón Venezuela of the Círculo Militar in Caracas. Blanco competed at Miss Grand International 2024 in Thailand, and was unplaced. Blanco won Miss Charm 2025, on 12 December 2025, at the BHD Studio in Ho Chi Minh City, Vietnam, competing against 34 other contestants. She was the first Venezuelan to win the contest.

Awards and achievements
Preceded by Malaysia, Rashmita Rasindran	Miss Charm; 2025	Succeeded by Incumbent
Preceded by Fernanda Ramírez	Miss Charm Venezuela; 2025	Succeeded by Oscaiderlys Espinoza
Preceded by Valentina Martínez	Miss Grand Venezuela; 2024	Succeeded by Nariman Battikha
