= Vanessa Coello =

Venezuelan model, Miss Grand Venezuela 2021

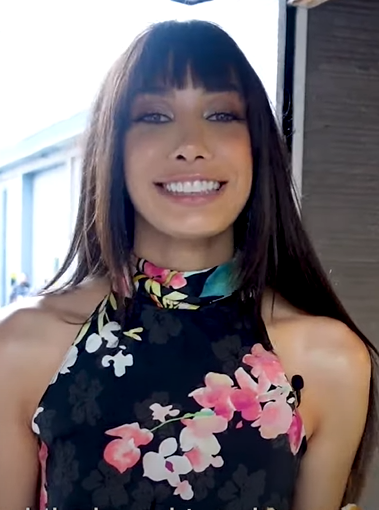
- Born: Vanessa Carolina Coello Coraspe; 1 September 1995 (age 31); Maturín, Monagas, Venezuela
- Education: Saint Mary University
- Occupations: Model; beauty pageant titleholder
- Height: 5 ft 10 in (1.78 m)
- Beauty pageant titleholder
- Title: Miss Grand Venezuela 2021
- Hair color: Light Brown
- Eye color: Green
- Major competitions: Miss Venezuela 2019; (2nd Runner-Up); Miss Grand International 2021; (Top 10)

Vanessa Carolina Coello Coraspe (born September 1, 1995) is a Venezuelan model who was crowned Miss Grand Venezuela 2021. Coello also represented the state of Monagas at the Miss Venezuela 2019 competition, managing to obtain fourth place, qualifying as 2nd Runner-Up.

In 2021, she represented Venezuela at the Miss Grand International 2021 pageant where she placed in Top 10.

== Modeling ==
Coello has worked as a model in Spain, Turkey and Italy.

== Pageantry ==
=== Miss Venezuela 2019 ===
Coello began her pageantry career representing her home state, Monagas, this time in Miss Venezuela 2019 pageant at the Estudio 1 de Venevisión in Caracas on August 1, 2019. Vanessa competed with 23 other candidates for the disputed crown, becoming one of the greats favorites of that edition. She placed as the 2nd Runner-Up and lost to eventual winner Thalía Olvino of Delta Amacuro as the new Miss Universe Venezuela 2019.

=== Miss Grand Venezuela 2021 ===
After a selection process, in which 6 finalists were chosen and among those who were, (Gabriela de la Cruz, Miss Supranational Venezuela 2019 and 4th Runner-Up in Miss Supranational 2019; Lisandra Chirinos, Miss Portuguesa 2020 and Top 10 in Miss Venezuela 2020; María José Duque, Top 5 in Miss Venezuela World 2015; Jhosskaren Carrizo, Miss Lara 2020 and Top 10 in Miss Venezuela 2020; and Samira Boutros), Vanessa was selected as the new Miss Grand Venezuela. For this process, social networks, mainly Instagram, were taken into consideration for the final choice of the chosen one.

Finally, on August 24, 2021, Coello was titled Miss Grand Venezuela 2021, being crowned by Valentina Figuera; thus succeeding Eliana Roa as Miss Grand Venezuela. Coello could not be crowned by Roa, since she was based in Turkey at the time of the coronation.

=== Miss Grand International 2021 ===
As Miss Grand Venezuela, Coello represented Venezuela at the Miss Grand International 2021 pageant, which was take place on December 4, 2021, in Phuket, Thailand and she placed in Top 10.

Awards and achievements
| Preceded by Eliana Roa | Miss Grand Venezuela; 2021 | Succeeded by Luiseth Materán |
| Preceded by Anaid Valentina Fuentes Jaouhari | Miss Monagas; 2019 | Succeeded by María Antonietta Silva Ortega |
