= Teatro Municipal of Caracas =

Opera house in Venezuela

Coordinates: 10°30′07″N 66°55′03″W

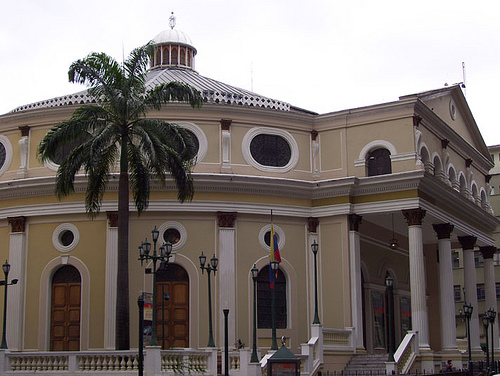
Teatro Municipal of Caracas

The Teatro Municipal of Caracas is an opera house in Venezuela. It was inaugurated by President Guzmán Blanco in 1881. The theatre was initially named after the president.

== Construction ==
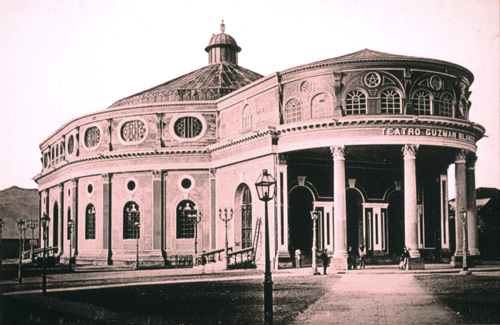
The theatre at the end of the 19th century

The building was designed by Esteban Ricard, a French architect who left Venezuela before the project was completed. It was finished under the direction of the Venezuelan engineer Jesús Muñoz Tébar. The building incorporates structural ironwork imported from Great Britain, as there was no domestic production at the time.

In 1896, President Joaquín Crespo commemorated General José Tadeo Monagas by erecting a statute of him in front of the theatre in a move for political unity.

The building was modified in 1949 to facilitate redevelopment of central Caracas.

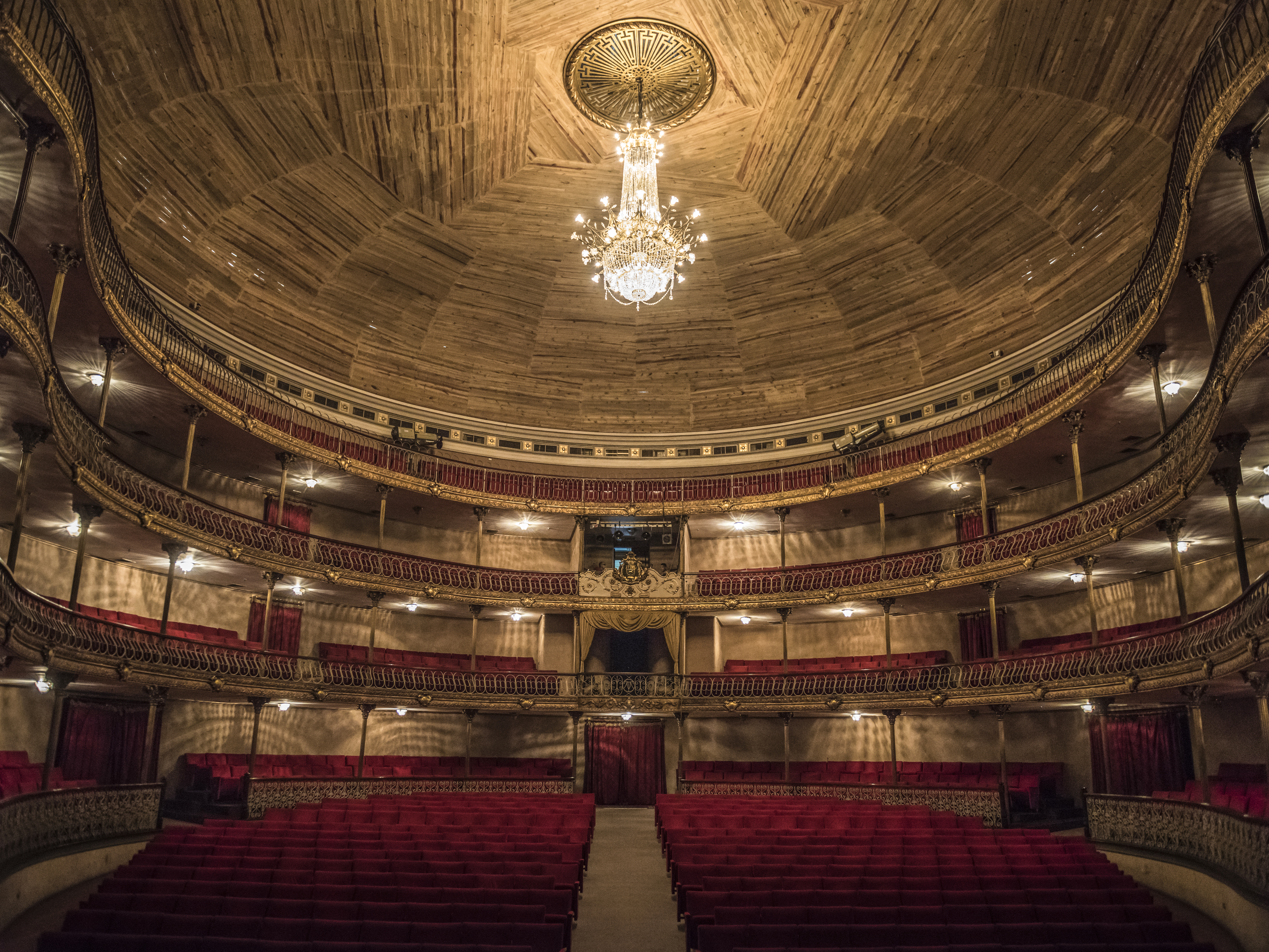
Interior

== Repertoire ==
It is one of the oldest opera houses in South America; it opened on 4 January 1881 with Italian composer Errico Petrella's 1858 opera Jone, which was revived for the centennial of the theatre in 1981 with noted Argentine soprano Adelaida Negri in the title role. It continues to mount operatic productions. but it is no longer the city's main opera house since the Teresa Carreño Cultural Complex opened in the 1980s. The Teatro Municipal is the home of the Municipal Symphony Orchestra of Caracas.
