= Venezuelan LGBTQ cinema =

Film genre

In Venezuelan cinema, national LGBT-themed films, largely those that deal with homosexuality and homophobia in society, have become the industry's main drivers in the 2010s.

The new wave of LGBT+ cinema in Venezuela has been likened to the Cuban gay cinema movement of the 1990s. Until 2017, the country had one LGBT+ film festival, which had started in 2011: FESTDIVQ (Festival Venezolano de Cine de la Diversidad).^{:293}

== Analysis ==
The movement of Venezuelan cinema to being LGBT-related has occurred at the same time as an "unprecedented" AIDS crisis, with the nation being short of basic medicines and the government removing anti-retroviral drugs from circulation. Many of the films also tackle other social issues present in Venezuelan society.

The 2010s "boom" of LGBT cinema in Latin America is celebrated as also being evident in the Venezuelan market (it may be the cause or association of the national LGBT+ cinema boom), despite Venezuelan cinema in general otherwise lagging far behind that of its neighbors.^{:192}

This boom included successful Venezuelan films including Miguel Ferrari's 2012 Azul y no tan rosa, which became the first Venezuelan film to win the Goya Award for Best Spanish Language Foreign Film (in the 2014 edition), and Mariana Rondón's 2013 coming-of-age Pelo malo, which won the Golden Shell at the 2013 San Sebastián International Film Festival. In writing on Venezuelan film turning towards the theme, Alfredo Meza described the two films as "wakeup calls against intolerance and homophobia in today's society". Shortly after Meza's critique, another film of the vein was released: Lorenzo Vigas's 2015 Desde allá, the first Latin American film to win the Golden Lion at the Venice International Film Festival. Patricia Ortega's 2019 film Yo, imposible, which premiered in 2018 at the Valladolid International Film Festival and South by Southwest; it continues narratives of intersex people, and is celebrated for having a positive ending. Several of these have been Venezuela's Academy Award for Best International Film submissions.

== In society ==
=== Relationship with government ===
In 2015, a report by the Associated Press showed that, per the National Cinematography Law accounting the state to encourage national filmmakers, many LGBT+ films received state funding. Though it suggested the support bore irony, the Arizona State University Latin American film scholar David William Foster noted that the government is aware of how poorly national films perform at the local box office and would rather fund LGBT+ films than let other countries produce them, to ensure fewer Venezuelans watch them. In review of a film released in 2019, the discussions are ongoing, one reviewer bringing up its societal context of "policy concerns regarding gay and queer rights that have yet to be addressed".

The wave's beginnings post-Chávez's death have been compared to the rise of Pedro Almodóvar following the death of Franco.

=== Public opinion ===
José González Vargas wrote on the growth of LGBT+ Venezuelan films, including personal appreciation that "around 2010, something changed"; as he grew up, gay characters in film were either comic, tragic, or upper-class white Americans. The first two are seen as negative representations, and young Venezuelans could not see themselves in the latter. The new wave meant that he and others could see the Venezuelan LGBT+ community and reality onscreen for the first time. This is also why he criticises the film Azul y no tan rosa, because it shows a middle class and easily accepted gay man, which he still deems alien and unrealistic; for the opposite reasons, Pelo malo resonated with him.

José Manuel Simons, a Venezuelan LGBT+ rights lawyer, suggested that the film coverage of the topic is a sign that the people of the country are more accepting and want to watch them.

== Films ==
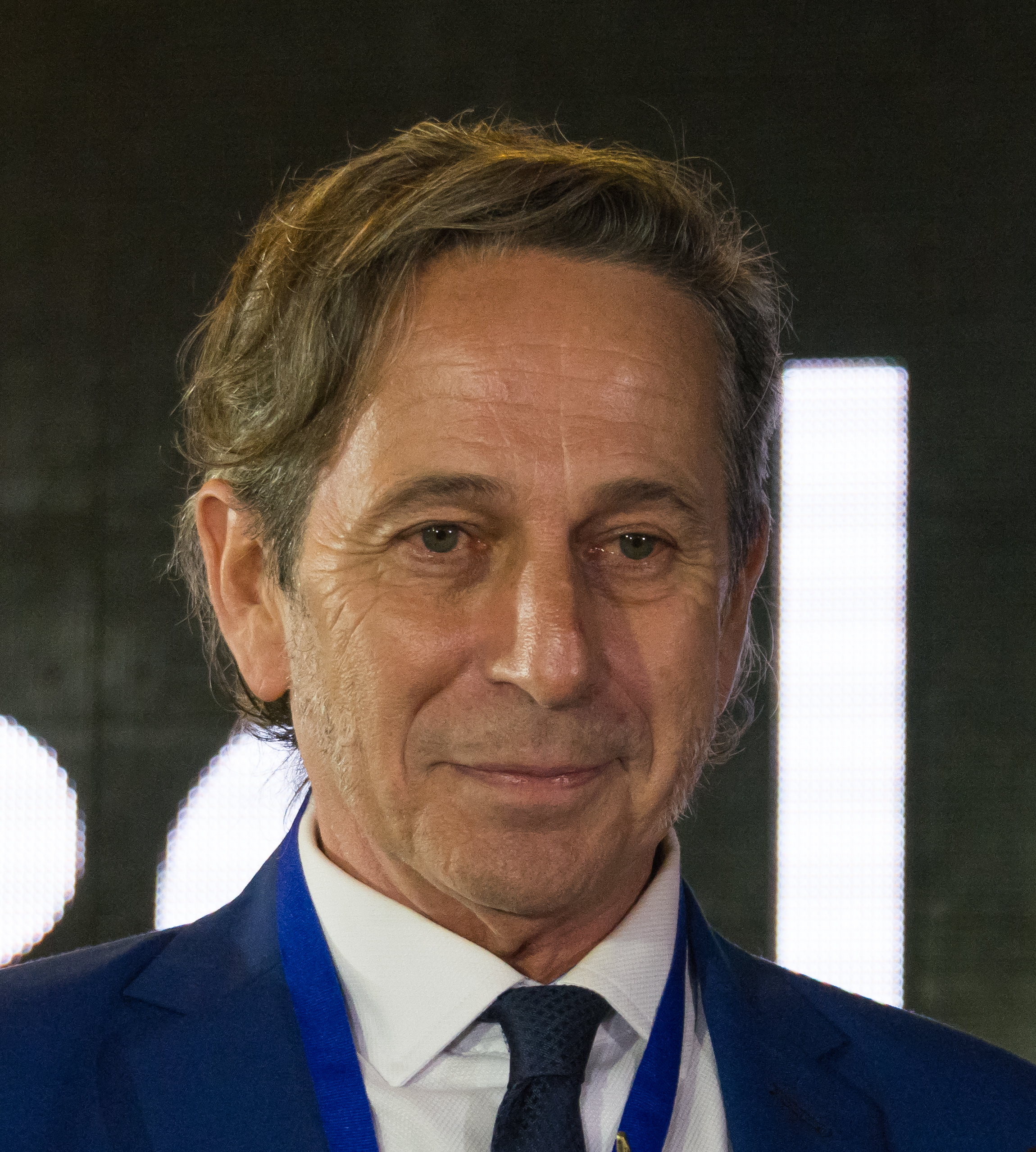
Alfredo Castro, who won an award for his role in Desde allá

The film trailer for Being Impossible

Year	Film title	Director	Notes
1982	Trans	Manuel Herreros de Lemos; Mateo Manaure Arilla	Documentary film
2008	The Color of Fame (El tinte de la fama)	Alejandro Bellame	Venezuelan submission to the Academy Award for Best Foreign Language Film (2008)
2009	Cheila	Eduardo Barberena	
2011	Yo, indocumentada	Andrea Baranenko	Part of the 2013 official selection of the United Nations Association Film Festival (UNAFF).
2012	Blue and Not So Pink (Azul y no tan rosa)	Miguel Ferrari	marketed in the United States as My Straight Son
2013	Bad Hair (Pelo malo)	Mariana Rondón	
2013	Red	Carlos Alejandro Molina M.	short film
2014	Liz in September (Liz en septiembre)	Fina Torres	adaptation of Last Summer at Bluefish Cove; marketed as first Spanish-language lesbian film
2015	From Afar (Desde allá)	Lorenzo Vigas	Venezuelan submission to the Academy Award for Best Foreign Language Film (2016)
2016	Tamara	Elia K. Schneider	Inspired in the life of transgender politician Tamara Adrián
2017	La T invisible	Patricia Ortega	Short film
2018	Being Impossible (Yo, imposible)	Patricia Ortega	Venezuelan submission to the Academy Award for Best International Feature Film (2020)
2021	La candidata	Ronald Rivas	Documentary film
2023	Family Pride, Queer Aside (Queer: Orgullo Familiar)	María Millán	Documentary film

== See also ==
- Cinema of Venezuela: LGBT+ cinema
