= Cruz de nadie =

- Created by: Marte TV
- Written by: Félix B. Caignet; Silvia Vergara (adaptation); Crucita Torres (adaptation)
- Starring: Carolina Tejera Javier Valcarcel Luis Fernández; Nohely Arteaga; Pedro Lander; Joana Benedek Nubia Martí Mayra Africano
- Country of origin: Venezuela
- Original language: Spanish
- No. of episodes: 128

Production
- Producer: Víctor Fernández
- Running time: 45 minutes

Original release
- Network: Marte TV
- Release: 1994 – 1994

Related
- La hija de presidente; La Llaman Mariamor

Cruz de nadie (Cross of No One) is a Venezuelan telenovela which starred Luis Fernández, Nohely Noriega, Isabel Moreno and Joana Benedek. It was produced and broadcast on Marte TV in 1994.

== Synopsis ==
Cruz de nadie (Cross of No One) is the story of a forbidden love by the unfortunate laws of inheritance. Framed at the early 20th century, and breathtaking Andes landscapes, this is the story of Augusto Antúnez and Emilia Vegas' fight against the tyrant Teofilo Vegas, Emilia's Father, and their fate, which condemns their love. The fruit of this relationship are two children which are separated from their parents at birth. One of them, Luciano, will suffer the fatal sickness filling Augusto with horror and unable to withstand the pain that Emilia will bear upon seeing the maimed child decides to exchange him for a healthy girl. Maité Antúnez. She will seize their fortune and live surrounded in luxury and comfort that was rightfully the twins. The children are sold to a circus, and are raised as brother without knowing the truth. The second twin, Cruz de nadie, is raised in the circus by Yanina and falls in love with Maité to revive her parents’ story and fulfill the revenge that will clean the past of sin and misdeed.

== Cast ==
- Luis Fernández as Cruz
- Nohely Noriega as Maité Antúnez
- Julie Restifo as Dolores Vegas
- Joana Benedek as Cinara
- Mario Balmaseda
- Gustavo Rodríguez
- Lourdes Valera
- Mirtha Pérez
- Pedro Rentería
- Carolina Tejera
- Ricardo Álamo
- Martin Lantigua
- Orlando Fundicelli
- Javier Valcarcel
- Pedro Lander
- Betty Ruth
- Pierina Pérez
