= Carmen Cecilia Urbaneja =

Venezuelan producer

- Born: Venezuela
- Other names: Carmen Urbaneja
- Occupation: Producer
- Years active: 1984-present
- Notable work: Toda una dama Mis 3 hermanas ¡Qué buena se puso Lola!

Carmen Cecilia Urbaneja is a Venezuelan producer best known for her association with Telemundo and RCTV. She is currently vice-president of Telemundo Studios production.

== Filmography ==
| Year | Title | Notes |
|---|---|---|
| 1984 | Topacio | Production assistant |
| 1988 | Abigail | Executive Producer |
| 1991 | El Desprecio | Executive Producer |
| 1995 | Amores de fin de siglo | Executive Producer |
| 1996 | Volver a vivir | Executive Producer |
| 1999 | Luisa Fernanda | Executive Producer |
| 2000 | Mis 3 hermanas | Executive Producer |
| 2001 | A calzón quitao | Executive Producer |
| 2002 | Trapos íntimos | Executive Producer |
| 2004 | ¡Qué buena se puso Lola! | Executive Producer |
| 2005 | Amantes | Executive Producer |
| 2006 | Y los declaro marido y mujer | Executive Producer |
| 2007 | Toda una dama | Executive Producer |
| 2009 | Calle luna, Calle sol | Project manager |
| 2013 | Pasión Prohibida | Vice president of production |
| 2013-2014 | Santa Diabla | Vice president of production |
| 2014 | En otra piel | Vice president of production |
| 2014-2015 | Tierra de reyes | Executive Producer |
| 2015-2016 | ¿Quién es quién? | Executive Producer |
| 2016-2017 | Silvana sin lana | Executive Producer |
| 2016-2017 | El Chema | Executive Producer |
| 2016-2017 | La Doña | Executive Producer |
| 2017 | La Fan | Executive Producer |
