= Sirena (TV series) =

- Genre: Telenovela
- Written by: José Simón Escalona
- Directed by: Claudio Callao
- Starring: Astrid Gruber; Carlos Montilla; Alejandro Delgado; Ralbin Duarte
- Country of origin: Venezuela
- Original language: Spanish
- No. of episodes: 199

Production
- Producer: Gloria Altuve

Original release
- Network: Venevisión
- Release: 1993 – 1993

Sirena (Mermaid) is a Venezuelan telenovela shown in 1993, starring with Astrid Gruber, Carlos Montilla, and Alejandro Delgado.Ralbin Duarte This telenovela contains 199 episodes.

== Synopsis ==
Loyalty and the passion, face in a circle of misfortunes without fin a young one to majer in Sirena. In this tragic history, the happiness and the single success can be achieved through the total treason. Desires and the instincts untie when the beautiful and rebellious Sirena Baltazar knows Adonis Diniz; whose wealth, power and enchantment, will mark the destiny of Sirena. Afraid of the dark intentions of Adonis, Sirena's house with Jasyn Mendoza, a famous tenista. Jasyn was disabled by a mysterious accident during his wedding ceremony, and deeply blames Adonis and Sirena. While Sirena faces the decision to be faithful to its marriage or the instincts of its heart, Adonis fights to conquer the love of her. Maintaining one it doubles secret life, Adonis tries to be playboy without scruples, at the same time that is hidden after the masked hero: "the Lynx", dedicating its life to the noblest aims, to clean to the name of its father and his fortune... and to make sure the love Sirena. The price that it will have to pay, could cost the life to him. Sirena develops in the middle of the condition, the emotion and it intrigues it, in an intense drama, where the passions and the secrets are as deep as the sea.

== Cast ==
- Astrid Gruber as Sirena Baltazar
- Carlos Montilla as Adonis Diniz
- Alejandro Delgado as Juan Hundre
- Ralbin Duarte as Evelio
- Miguel Ferrari as Jason
- Yoletti Cabrera as Frenesí
- Alexander Montilla as Eneas
- Maria Eugenia Perera as Tormento
- Ricardo Herranz as Rancho
- Roxana Diaz as Perfidia
- Joana Benedek as Joana "La Divina"
- Carolina Tejera
- Jorge Aravena as Orbick
- Ricardo Alamo
- Saul Marin as Lorenzo "GoGo"
- Betty Ruth as Guillermina
- Jorge Reyes
- Luis Alberto de Mozos as Amado Gross
- Alexander Espinoza
- Xavier Bracho as Mozart
- Yajaira Paredes
- Alexander Silva
