= La hija del presidente =

- Created by: Marte TV
- Starring: Luis Gerardo Nuñez; Mariela Álcala; Saul Marin; Roxana Diaz Burgos
- Country of origin: Venezuela
- Original language: Spanish
- No. of episodes: 125

Production
- Running time: 45 minutes

Original release
- Network: Marte TV
- Release: 1994 – 1994

Related
- El paseo de la gracia de Dios; Cruz de nadie

La hija de presidente (The Daughter of the President) is a Venezuelan telenovela which starred Luis Gerardo Nuñez, Mariela Álcala, Saul Marin and Roxana Diaz Burgos. It was produced and broadcast on Marte TV in 1994.

== Synopsis ==
La hija de presidente (The Daughter of the President) is a story of passion and revenge that begins with an attempted coup d'état led by Captain Fabricio Camacho against Benito Santana's despotic government. During the attempt, Alma, the rebel's wife dies and his daughter disappears, reason for which he swears to return to his country in order to look for her. Martina, captain Daniel Santana's faithful servant, the dictator's son, will pick up the little girl, managing to make his boss agree to raise her in his very own house. Years went by and Yura, Fabricio Camacho's daughter grows into a beautiful and untamed woman, and without realizing it, will spark love in the man she considers to be her father. Ariel Alvarado, Adriana Sarabia's first-born son, is invited to Daniel Santana's house to overcome the depression caused by the sudden abandonment of his beloved girlfriend, Jimena Saint Llorens, without knowing that his host is really his father. Upon meeting, Yura and Ariel will feel deeply attracted to each other, living an impassioned romance behind Daniel's back. The fate will separate them, when Yura has a miscarriage and blames Ariel, thinking that he was betrayed, she swears to take revenge against him. Turning pain into strength, the young woman agrees to marry Daniel, now president of the island, and must escape to Venezuela after the new coup led by Fabricio Camacho is successful. In Venezuela, the Alvarado family offers them their hospitality, because of the good relationship they had with the Santana Government. That is how Yura, Daniel, Ariel and Adriana come together under the same roof, struggling against their feelings and the past they cannot forget.

== Cast ==
- Luis Gerardo Nuñez
- Mariela Álcala
- Saul Marin
- Roxana Diaz Burgos as Pamela Alvarado
- Carolina Tejera
- Orlando Fundicelli
- Jorge Reyes
- Alexánder Espinoza
- Rebeca Aleman as Dolores Cantelo
