= Family Pride, Queer Aside =

- Film poster
- Queer: Orgullo Familiar
- Directed by: María Millán
- Produced by: María Millán
- Starring: Aisak Ovalles
- Music by: Benedetto Guidotti
- Release date: 2023
- Running time: 78 minutes
- Country: Venezuela
- Language: Spanish

Family Pride, Queer Aside (Spanish: Queer: Orgullo Familiar) is a Venezuelan documentary film directed by María Millán and released in 2024. The film follows Aisak Ovalles, a young queer man of color who assumed the paternity of three children during the COVID-19 pandemic. It was the director's debut documentary film.

== Plot ==
Family Pride, Queer Aside follows Aisak Ovalles, a young queer man of color and drag queen who assumed the paternity of three children, along with his sister, during the COVID-19 pandemic in Venezuela.

== Production ==
The documentary's production was made in 2021 and was negatively affected by the COVID-19 pandemic. The documentary seeks to raise awareness in Venezuelan society about diverse families and the LGBT community's ability to have a family. At the time of the documentary's production, the recognition of same-parent families and adoption by LGBT people faced multiple obstacles in the country.

The director, María Millán, expressed that the film was unique in its style and that she wanted it to be a reference to help guarantee the right of the LGBT community in Venezuela to form a family. Family Pride, Queer Aside was Millán's first feature-length documentary film.

== Release ==
In 2024, it premiered at the Feminist Border Arts Film Festival (in New Mexico, ninth edition), the Philadelphia Latino Arts & Film Festival (thirteenth edition) and the Queer Utrecht Film Festival. It was scheduled to be screened on 1 October 2024 at Teatrex El Bosque theater, in Caracas, followed by a panel with a homoparental family.

== See also ==
- Venezuelan LGBTQ cinema
- La T invisible
- Yo, indocumentada
