= Ricardo Álamo =

Venezuelan actor

- Born: Nelson Ricardo Álamo Flores; December 10, 1970 (age 55); Caracas, Venezuela
- Occupations: Actor; Model; Television Director; Television Producer
- Years active: 1992–present
- Height: 1.85 m (6 ft 1 in)
- Spouse: Marjorie de Sousa (m. 2004; div. 2006)
- Partner: Carolina Muizzi
- Children: 4

Nelson Ricardo Álamo Flores (born December 10, 1970) better known as Ricardo Álamo is a Venezuelan actor, television director, television producer, and model.

== Personal life ==
He married Marjorie de Sousa in May 2004. The couple divorced in 2006.

== Filmography ==
=== Films ===
Year	Title	Role	Notes
2005	La Fiesta del Chivo	Ramfis Trujillo	Debut film

=== Television ===
Year	Title	Role	Notes
1992	La loba herida	Carlitos Sulbarán	
1993	Sirena		
1994	Cruz de nadie		
1997	María de los Ángeles	Rogelio Vargas	
1998	Reina de corazones	Jean Paul	
1998	Niña mimada	José "Cheo" Mogollón	
1999	Luisa Fernanda	Miguel Enrique	
2000	Mis 3 hermanas	Santiago Ortega Díaz	Lead role
2002	Juana la virgen	Mauricio de la Vega	Lead role
2003	Rebeca	Eduardo Montalbán	Lead role
2004	Amor del bueno	Bernardo Valdez	
2005	Ser bonita no basta	Alejandro Mendoza	
2006	El desprecio	Raúl Velandró	
2007	Toda una dama	Miguel Reyes	Lead role
2010	La mujer perfecta	Santiago Reverón	Lead role
2012	Válgame Dios	José Alberto Gamboa	Lead antagonist
2013–2014	De todas maneras Rosa	Leonardo Alfonso Macho Vergara	Lead role
2015	Tómame o déjame	Uday	
2017	Milagros de Navidad	Manny	
2018	Mi familia perfecta	Rafael	
2018	Ellas aman, ellos mienten	Humberto Monteverde	
2021	La Suerte De Loli	Rufino Olivera	Recurring Role
2022	Un Papa Para Navidad	Jorge Luis	Tv Movie
2025	Maria Madre De Dios	Jacobo	Tv Movie

=== As producer and director ===
Year	Title	Notes
2014	Escándalos: Todo es real excepto sus nombres	Director/producer
2015	Tómame o déjame	Director/producer
2024	Eva y Adam En Miami	Producer
2025	Modo Millonaria	Director
