= La T invisible =

- Directed by: Patricia Ortega
- Screenplay by: Patricia Ortega; Sharom Nadine
- Produced by: Mandrágora Films
- Starring: Sharom Nadine; Gaby Lugo
- Cinematography: Damien Girón
- Edited by: Damien Girón
- Music by: Damien Girón
- Release date: 2017
- Country: Venezuela
- Language: Spanish

La T invisible (lit. 'The invisible T') is a short documentary film directed by Venezuelan filmmaker Patricia Ortega and released in 2017. The documentary deals with gender, identity and sexual orientation.

== Plot ==
La T invisible is a documentary that deals with the boundaries of gender, identity and sexual orientation. It follows Sharom, who shares dresses and underwear with his wife, and the duality between the masculine side that is his public appearance and the feminine side that is his censored expression.

== Release ==
The short film was part of the short film exhibition of the Caracas Documentary Film Festival in 2020. It was screened at the José Ignacio Cabrujas Hall of the Los Palos Grandes Library, in Caracas, during the National Day of Cinema.

In 2021, as part of Pride Day, it was one of the films screened at the first edition of Encuentro Diverso, as well as at the Canal Clandestino Audiovisual Festival in the same year.

== Reception ==
The documentary film was recognized as the best documentary short film at the VII Encounter for Cinephiles, at the 2017 CineArte en la Frontera Film Festival.

== See also ==
- Venezuelan LGBTQ cinema
- Family Pride, Queer Aside
- Yo, indocumentada
