= Luis Fernández (actor) =

Venezuelan actor

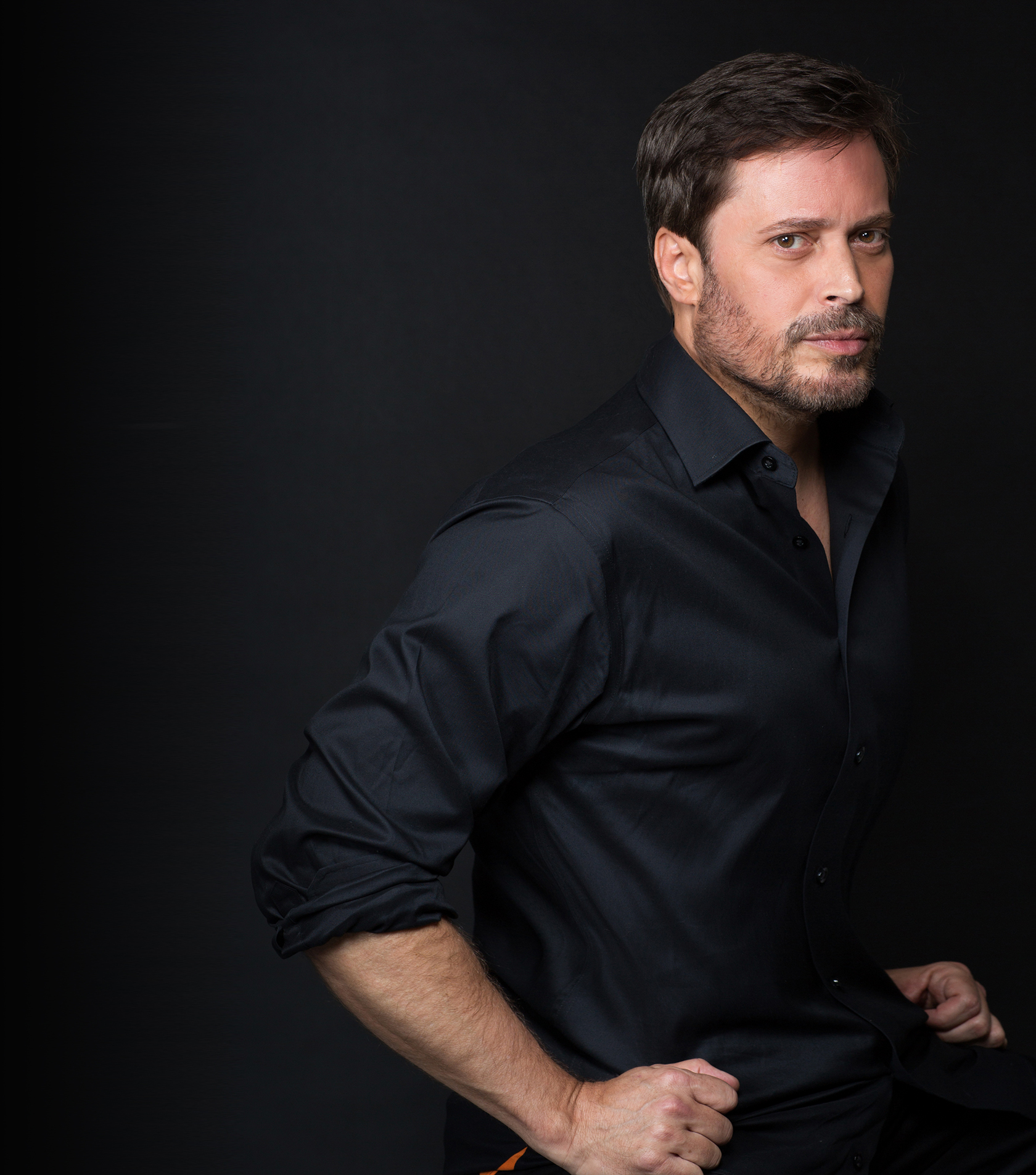
- Born: Luis Eduardo Fernández Oliva; March 14, 1973 (age 53); Caracas, Venezuela
- Occupations: Actor; producer; director
- Years active: 1992–present
- Spouse: Mimí Lazo

Luis Eduardo Fernández Oliva (born 14 March 1973) is a Venezuelan actor, writer, producer, and director. He is known for his role in the 2016 film Tamara, and for his stand-up show It's not you, it’s me (No eres tú, soy yo). He has worked extensively on stage and in film and TV, and has published books, essays, and newspaper columns.

== Early life and education ==
Luis Eduardo Fernández Oliva was born on 14 March 1973 in Caracas, Venezuela.

Fernández graduated in architecture in 1991 from the Universidad Simón Bolívar, in Caracas, and attended the Harvard Graduate School of Design from 1990, graduating in 1993. His thesis, "The Boston Studio", was published by Cuadernos Lagoven in Caracas.

From 2008 he attended the New York Film Academy, graduating in Filmmaking in 2012.

== Career ==
Fernández started his career on stage at age 19, and developed his directorial skills on stage.

His directorial debut in filmmaking was with the short film Blue Sky produced at the New York Film Academy, which was selected to the official competition in several international film festivals.

The 2016 film Tamara, inspired by the life of Tamara Adrián, is about a successful lawyer who takes the decision to start a gender transition, and Fernández plays the lead role as Teo/Tamara.

In 2022, Fernández directed and shot a film using his smartphone, based on a story by Venezuelan screenwriter Mónica Montañés, and workshopped with the actor Veronica Oddó in Santiago, Chile. His wife Mimi Lazo was producer and lead actor of the film, called Desconocidas (Unknowns). He described it as a very personal project: "The opportunity to tell a story by Monica Montañés about the loss of identity that comes with having to leave your home, your family, your country, your house, is the story of 7 million Venezuelans scattered all over the world". The scenes were captured via Zoom, in front of an invited live audience. Lazo was in Madrid at the time, Oddó in Chile, and Nina Rancel in Los Angeles, but the film shows them in one apartment. Unknowns was screened at the SmartFone Flick Fest in Sydney, Australia.

== Radio and stand-up ==
For over three years Fernández was the creator and host of the radio show The Sex Sense, that premiered in May 2004 to become an audience phenomenon on Venezuelan radio. He interviewed more than a thousand successful professional women from Venezuela, Latin America and Spain. This show became the basis of his ongoing stand-up show It's not you, it’s me (No eres tú, soy yo).

== Other activities ==
Fernández established "Broadway En Español", an international and multi-disciplinary production company that creates shows for Broadway in Spanish.

As of 2024 Fernández is an ambassador for SmartFone Flick Fest (SF3), a film festival held annually in Sydney, Australia.

== Recognition and awards ==
His stage work has been showcased Ibero-American International Theater Festival of Bogota, the largest theatre festival in the world.

Fernández has won several acting awards, including five international film festival awards for best actor for his performance in Tamara (2016), including at the Milan International Film Festival, the Fine Arts Film Festival in Dominican Republic, and the Yale University Film Festival.

== Personal life ==
Fernández married Venezuelan actress Mimí Lazo.

As of 2024 he lives in Los Angeles.

== Theatre ==
=== Director and producer ===
- Golpes a mi puerta (Knocks At My Door), Caracas, 2007–2008; Bogotá, 2008. Also leading role, 2008. Selection at the Bogota's International Theater Festival, 2008. Opening Show, Caracas International Theater Festival, 2008.
- No eres tú, soy yo (It’s Not You, It’s Me), Caracas, 2006–2008. Also writer and leading role.
- Jav y Jos (Jav and Jos), Caracas 2005, Bogotá 2006, Madrid 2006. Also leading role.
- El Aplauso va por dentro (The Applause Is Within You), Madrid, 2004. Producer only.

=== Other leading roles ===
- Don Juan Tenorio, Los Angeles Theater Center, Los Angeles, 1998.
- El Pez que Fuma (The Smoking Fish), Caracas, 1994.
- El Príncipe Constante (The Constant Prince), Caracas, 1992. Municipal Award, Best Actor, 1992.
- Cyrano de Begerac, Caracas, 1991.
- La Hora del Lobo (Bergman's The Hour of the Wolf), Caracas, 1991.
- Self-Portrait of an Artist, Caracas, Bogotá, Essen (Germany), 1990.

== Publications ==
- La cruenta venganza del hombre que todos querían ser (The Gruesome Revenge Of the Man Everyone Wanted To Be). The New Game, 2004. Novel.
- Sexo Sentido (The Sex Sense). Criteria, 2005. A bestseller in Venezuela.
- Sexo Sentido II: Mis primeras quininetas (The Sex Sense II: My First Five Hundred). Ediciones B, 2006.
- Agenda Sexo Sentido (The Sex Sense Calendar). Ediciones B, 2007–2008. Calendar.
- Sexo Sentido III: No eres tú, soy yo (The Sex Sense 3: It's Not You, It's Me). Ediciones B. Essay. Independently published February, 2019
- Weekly columnist of EME magazine, the Thursday's publication by the Venezuelan journal El Nacional

== Filmography ==
=== As director ===
- The Sex Sense (TV, 2019)
- The Human Voice (new media, 2021)
- JAV & JOS: a[n almost] perfect couple (new media, 2021; also appears in it)
- The Human Voice (feature, 2022)
- Desconocidas (Unknowns, 2022)
- Cubalibre (2022)
- A Salesman (feature, 2024; also appears in it)
- The Smoking Fish, 2026

=== As actor ===
Film roles (actor)
Year	Title	Roles
2006	Francisco de Miranda	Francisco de Miranda
2011	Reverón	Nicolás Ferdinadov
2011	Hoara Menos	Alfredo
2014	Espejos	Octavio
2016	Tamara	Teo/ Tamara
2018	Humanpersons	James
2022	Samland	JJ

Television roles
Year	Title	Roles	Notes
1992	La loba herida	Daniel Algarbe	
1993	El paseo de la gracia de Dios	Erásmo Alfonzo	
1994	Cruz de nadie	Cruz	
1997–1998	Llovizna	Orinoco Fuego	
1998	Ghost Stories	Father Eric Sandoval	Episode: "Bless Me Father"
1999	Calypso	Simón Vargas / El Náufrago Pérez	
1999	Mujer secreta	Gustavo Landaeta	
2000	Hay amores que matan	César Augusto Montenegro	
2001	A calzón quita'o	Juan Antonio Contreras	
2003	La Cuaima	Cristo Jesús Guédez	
2004	Natalia de 8 a 9	Esposo	Television film
2004	Negra consentida	Rodolfo Aristiguieta	
2017–2018	Dynasty	Alejandro Raya	Recurring (season 1); 4 episodes
