= Inocente de ti =

Mexican telenovela

- Genre: Telenovela; Romance; Drama
- Created by: Inés Rodena
- Written by: Carlos Romero; Tere Medina; Julio Gaibay
- Directed by: Miguel Córcega; Leonardo Daniel; Víctor Manuel Fouilloux
- Starring: Valentino Lanús; Camila Sodi; Helena Rojo; Carolina Tejera; Lupita Ferrer
- Opening theme: Algo Más by La Quinta Estacion; Inocente de Ti by Juan Gabriel
- Country of origin: Mexico
- Original language: Spanish
- No. of episodes: 130

Production
- Executive producer: Nathalie Lartilleux
- Producers: Alfredo Schwarz; Salvador Mejía
- Production locations: Filming; Televisa San Ángel; Mexico City, Mexico; Locations; Mexico City, Mexico; Miami, United States
- Camera setup: Multi-camera
- Running time: 42-45 minutes
- Production company: Televisa

Original release
- Network: Canal de las Estrellas; Univision
- Release: November 8, 2004 – May 6, 2005

Related
- La italianita (1972); Rina (1977); Rubí rebelde (1989); María Mercedes (1992-1993); Maria Esperança (2007); María Mercedes (2013); Inocente de Ti (2016)

Inocente de Ti (Lit. Title: Innocent of you /English title: Pure Innocence) is a Mexican telenovela produced by Nathalie Lartilleux for Televisa in 2004.

On Monday, November 8, 2004, Canal de las estrellas began to broadcast Inocente de Ti on weekdays at 5:00pm, to replace Amar otra vez. The last episode of Inocente de Ti was broadcast on Friday, May 6, 2005, and Piel de otoño replaced it the following day.

Camila Sodi and Valentino Lanús starred as protagonists, while Helena Rojo and Carolina Tejera starred as antagonists. Lupita Ferrer and Ricardo Blume starred as stellar performances.

== Plot ==
Flor (also referred to as Florecita) travels from Mexico to USA, with her grandmother Clotilde and her younger sister Isela, in order for the girls to reunite with their father, Ruben, and two brothers, Rodrigo (younger) and Victor (older), who live in Miami.

During the trip, Clotilde dies in the desert. The girls bury their grandmother in the desert and continue to Miami, only to find out that their father is an alcoholic.

Flor's mother, Gabriela, lives in Miami, although her children believe her to be dead. Gabriela has remarried, and is now a famous television director. One day Florecita and Gabriela meet without recognizing each other.

Flor begins to work right away, selling flowers on the street and cleaning cars. One day, she meets Julio Alberto and his girlfriend Gloria, who are preparing for their wedding. Julio Alberto buys Gloria a flower from Flor.

Gloria dies at the wedding, and Julio Alberto is overwhelmed with grief. After a while, he starts to spend time in the park where he and Gloria walked together and where they used to be so happy. He sometimes sees Flor and starts talking to her.

Julio Alberto's mother, Rebeca, lives with her three children in the house of her twin sister Raquel. The sisters hate each other and Rebeca is silently waiting Raquel's death from cancer.

Raquel plans to leave her fortune to Flor, so that Rebeca doesn't get a penny; when the will is read, Rebeca is furious.

Believing that money is rightfully hers, she makes her son seduce Flor, and comes up with a plan to steal the money from the young girl and throw her out on the streets.

Flor doesn't care about losing her fortune because she was never rich in the first place, but she is disappointed that Julio Alberto lied to her and betrayed her, and she believed in him.

She decides to find a job as a maid, with the Dalmacci family, where Sergio, the trouble-making son, falls in love with Flor, fascinated by the goodness of her heart.

Then Julio Alberto re-enters Flor's life, realizing that he is truly in love with her. He begs Flor to forgive him and return to him. Whom does her heart belong to now? Is it Julio Alberto or Sergio?

== Cast ==
- Camila Sodi as Flor de María "Florecita" González de Castillo
- Valentino Lanús as Julio Alberto Castillo Linares-Robles
- Helena Rojo as Rebeca Linares-Robles Vda. de Castillo/Raquel Linares-Robles
- Lupita Ferrer as Gabriela Smith
- Carolina Tejera as Nuria Salas Montero
- Luis José Santander as Sergio Dalmacci Rionda
- Karla Álvarez as Aurora
- Ricardo Blume as Armando Dalmacci
- Karla Monroig as Gloria del Junco
- Altair Jarabo as Isela González de Castillo
- Abraham Ramos as Efraín Castillo Linares-Robles
- Katie Barberi as Mayte Dalmacci
- Toño Mauri as Sebastián Rionda
- Salvador Pineda as Rubén González
- Alma Delfina as Lupe
- Virna Flores as Virginia Castillo Linares-Robles
- Miguel Córcega as Lic. Mauricio Riveroll
- Patricia Reyes Spíndola as Grandmother Cleotilde
- Ariel López Padilla as Lic. Gómez Riveroll
- Dayana Garroz as Gladis Soler
- Leonardo Daniel as Filemón
- Yul Bürkle as Douglas
- Eleazar Gómez as Víctor González
- Miguel Loyo as Rodrigo González
- Ilithya Manzanilla as Mónica Dalmacci
- Marita Capote as Coromoto
- Elodia Riovega as Chalia #1
- María Piñeiro as Chalia #2
- Manolo Coego as Zacarías
- Marisela Buitriago as Fe
- Fred Valle as William Smith
- Eddie Nava as Miguel
- Pilar Hurtado as Carmela González
- Catalina Mesa as Violeta
- Juan Carlos Gutiérrez as Azteca
- Jorge Luis Pascual as Omar
- Ariel Díaz as Manolo
- Carlos Yustis as Cándido
- Irene López as Gema
- Néstor Emmanuel as Porfirio
- Michael Scalli as Benigno
- Tania Vázquez as Pilar
- Harry Geithner as Gustavo
- Jorge Van Rankin as Pepe Toño
- Ismael La Rosa as Gilberto
- Carlos Mesber as Genaro
- Arianna Coltelacci as María del Socorro García
- Valerie Peshuta as Teresita Rionda Dalmacci
- Carlos Riestra as Mayito
- José Bardina as Armando
- Daniel Dhoy as Rogelio
- Carlos Farach as Dr. Valdez
- Justin Bell as La migra

== International broadcast ==
In the Philippines, it was aired on ABS-CBN from October 30, 2006 to September 7, 2007 replacing Pasión de Amor dubbed in Tagalog and its theme song was "Kung Kaya Ko" (If I Can) performed by Toni Gonzaga.

== Awards ==
Year	Award	Category	Nominee	Result
2005	23rd TVyNovelas Awards	Best Antagonist Actress	Helena Rojo	Won
