= Amigas y rivales =

- Genre: Telenovela
- Created by: Emilio Larrosa
- Written by: Alejandro Pohlenz
- Directed by: Salvador Garcini; José Ángel García
- Starring: Michelle Vieth; Ludwika Paleta; Angélica Vale; Arath de la Torre; Joana Benedek; Eric del Castillo; Adamari López; Rodrigo Vidal; Rafael Inclán; Johnny Lozada; Susana González
- Opening theme: "Amigas y rivales" by Kabah
- Country of origin: Mexico
- Original language: Spanish
- No. of episodes: 185

Production
- Executive producer: Emilio Larrosa
- Producer: Arturo Pedraza Loera
- Production locations: Filming; Televisa San Ángel; Mexico City, Mexico
- Cinematography: Alfredo Tappan; Luis Monroy
- Editors: Adrián Frutos; Marco Antonio Rocha
- Camera setup: Multi-camera
- Running time: 42–45 minutes
- Production company: Televisa

Original release
- Network: Canal de las Estrellas
- Release: February 26 – November 9, 2001

Related
- Amigas & Rivais (2007)

Amigas y rivales (English: Friends and Rivals) is a Mexican juvenile telenovela produced by Emilio Larrosa for Televisa in 2001. On Monday, February 26, 2001, Canal de las Estrellas started broadcasting Amigas y rivales weekdays at 7:00pm, replacing Primer amor, a mil por hora. The last episode was broadcast on Friday, November 9, 2001, with El juego de la vida replacing it the following Monday.

It stars Michelle Vieth, Arath de la Torre, Angélica Vale, Johnny Lozada, Ludwika Paleta, Rodrigo Vidal, Adamari López and Gabriel Soto.

In 2025, the entire series was remastered and exclusively premiered on the TelevisaUnivision-owned Tlnovelas channel.

== Plot ==
Amigas y Rivales tells the story of four women from different social backgrounds. The first is Laura, a studious, sensitive, serious girl from a middle-class family; she studies data processing in a private university because she received a scholarship.

Jimena is the typical rich girl, dissipated and irresponsible, for whom sex is just another amusement. At one point she is kidnapped although she doesn't realize it. She lives with Sebastián, a drug dealer who gives her drugs in exchange for her having sex with men in his home. Ofelia is Jimena's best friend. Like Jimena, she is rich and lives for pleasure and fun, until she gets infected with HIV.

The fourth protagonist is Nayeli, who has a humble background and works as a maid in Jimena's home. Nayeli dreams of being a Hollywood actress, like her idol, Salma Hayek. This dream takes her to the United States illegally, where she meets boxer Johnny Trinidad, who falls in love with her. She is reported to the immigration service and deported back to Mexico.

Laura's emotions are divided between Robertito and his father, Don Roberto de la O, who hired Laura to instruct his firm in how to use their new computers. Don Roberto becomes determined to attract Laura, who unconsciously compares him with her own father, a man of weak character. Laura and Don Roberto date briefly; their relationship ends when Laura's mother lies to Don Roberto, telling him she's his daughter. Later Laura discovers that he is not her biological father, and that she was the result of a one-night stand. Her parents separate. She resumes dating Don Roberto until she realizes, weeks later, that she isn't in love with him after all. She is caught kissing his son Robertito. When Don Roberto discovers, thanks to Roxana's deceitful efforts to keep him, that Laura loves Robertito, he suffers a stroke.

Roxana, Don Roberto's second wife, is extremely beautiful but hiding an unscrupulous criminal soul under the mask of an ideal wife. Her real name is Carolina. She attempted to kill her own father, Tomás, for which he sent her to an asylum, but she escaped and established the new identity of Roxana. She poisoned Don Roberto's first wife so he'd be free to marry her, but secretly desired her new stepson Robertito and killed his fiancée so she would have a chance with him. They became romantically involved, but Robertito realizes how much he loves Laura and tries to end his relationship with Roxana, which angers her. Roxana teams up with Sebastián to take revenge on the friends. She goes to jail but manages to escape.

Georgina sleeps with Sebastián and gets pregnant but she later shoots and kills him. After having been unwilling to live, Ofelia chooses to fight for her life. Roberto proposes to Laura. Jimena sheds her bad habits, and Nayeli manages to carry on a successful acting career.

At the friends' graduation party, Roxana appears with a group of armed men planning to take revenge on Jimena and Laura. Laura is absent because she felt sick. Roxana mentions killing Roberto's first wife. Joaquin is accidentally killed.

Pepe is shot in the arm. Carlota reveals that Robertito and Roxana are half-siblings, as Padre Tomás is the father of both of them. Roxana wants to throw sulfuric acid on Jimena's face but Nayeli, Ofelia and Tamara hold her and Nayeli manages to make Roxana pour the acid on her own face. The police arrive and detain Roxana, and she ends in an asylum with a disfigured face.

Jimena chose Pepe because Carlos failed her when he chose Ángela over her and will not forgive him. He wishes her happiness with Pepe. Paula gives up Ernesto so he can be happy with Nayeli. Nayeli ends up with Ernesto. Tamara ends up alone because of her bad luck with men.

Ofelia and Ulises reunite the whole group Jimena, Nayeli, Tamara, Georgina, Robertito, Johnny, Ernesto, and Pepe at the end. Ulises announces that Ofelia has a life expectancy of at least 10 more years. They celebrate life and friendship together after so much pain and suffering.

Notably, Laura is absent from the finale because, in real life, her actress-- Michelle Vieth-- was sick with gastroenteritis and had to go to the hospital.

== Cast ==
- Michelle Vieth as Laura González Uribe
- Arath de la Torre as Roberto "Robertito" de la O Terán
- Ludwika Paleta as Jimena de la O Terán
- Rodrigo Vidal as Armando del Valle
- Adamari López as Ofelia Villada Ruvalcaba
- Gabriel Soto as Ulises Barrientos "El Feo"
- Angélica Vale as Wendy Nayeli Pérez Chacon
- Johnny Lozada as Johnny Trinidad
- Joana Benedek as Roxana Brito de la O / Carolina Vallejo
- Eric del Castillo as Don Roberto de la O
- Rafael Inclán as Ramón "Moncho" / Jacaranda / Manuel de la Colina
- Susana González as Ángela Riveira
- Alejandro Ávila as Sebastián Morales
- Manuela Ímaz as Tamara de la Colina
- Chela Castro as Carlota Olmedo
- Eugenio Cobo as Pedro González
- Alicia Fahr as Alma Uribe de González
- Marisol Mijares as Andrea González Uribe
- Mayrín Villanueva as Georgina Sánchez
- René Strickler as Carlos Torreblanca
- Eduardo Santamarina as José "Pepe" Alcántara
- Ernesto Laguardia as himself
- Nailea Norvind as Paula Morell
- Felicia Mercado as Sonia Villalobos Vda. de Torreblanca
- Imperio Vargas as Yolanda
- Zoila Quiñones as Adelaida
- Irina Areu as La Güera
- Marina Marín as Amada
- Luis Roberto Guzmán as Francisco "Frank"
- Carlos Miguel as Guillermo Morales "El Chacal"
- Sergio deFassio as Chema
- Sergio Acosta as Gardenia
- Ricardo Silva as Joaquin Dorantes
- Elías Chiprout as Luis Santoscoy
- Edgar Ponce as Ricardo
- Benjamín Rivero as Eduardo
- Rudy Casanova as Antonio "Tony"
- Ana Liz Rivera as Marilú
- Claudia Troyo as Mónica
- Salim Rubiales as Germán de la Colina
- Ramón Valdés Urtiz as Rodrigo
- Paulo César Quevedo as Edgar Romero
- Martha Julia as Margarita Reyes Retana
- Luis Couturier as Emilio Larrosa
- Damián Mendiola as Abelardo
- Alejandro de la Madrid as Rolando
- Silvia Suárez as Leonora
- Miguel Palmer as Alberto
- Arsenio Campos as Father Tomás Vallejo
- Rosángela Balbó as Magdalena de Morell
- Maki as Alejandra del Valle
- Arturo Farfán as "El Momo"
- Patricia Ramírez as Natalia Solís
- Shirley as Julieta
- Maricruz Nájera as Camelia
- Alejandra Gollas as Jessica
- Christina Pastor as Irene
- Claudio Sorel as Lorenzo Riveira
- Juan Romanca as Pascual
- Mariana Rivera as Juanita
- Abril Campillo as Susana
- Rodrigo Ruiz as Father Emiliano
- Krystian Mohzo Díaz as "El Mosh"
- Elizabeth Álvarez as Rocío del Toro
- Bibelot Mansur as Stephany
- Guillermo Capetillo as Esteban
- Kelchie Arizmendi as Gisela
- Joemy Blanco as Rebeca
- Jorge Veytía as Miguel
- Eduardo Cuervo as Óscar
- Vanessa Arias as Isabel
- Julio Becker as Javier
- Pablo Osuna as Octavio
- Lorena Velázquez as Itzel de la Colina
- Fabián Fuentes as Brian Pérez
- Karen Sandoval as Gemma Pérez
- Ángel Claude as Jonathan Pérez
- María Luisa Coronel as Johnny's mother
- Ana Hally as Josefina
- Joana Brito as Mother Superior
- Alejandro Calva as Jorge
- Enrique Hidalgo as Enrique "Quique" Montegarza
- Alondra Torres as Jennifer
- Itatí Cantoral as Eduviges
- Maribel Guardia as herself
- Sergio Sendel as himself
- Andrea Legarreta as herself
- Martha Carrillo as herself
- Salvador Garcini as himself
- José Ángel García as himself
- Amelia Zapata as "La Cara Cortada"
- Arturo Lorca as Julio
- Benjamín Islas as Comandante
- José Luis Reséndez as Juan
- Gustavo Negrete as Doctor
- Jorge Robles as "El Chino"
- Juan Ángel Esparza as Francisco
- Néstor Leoncio as Alfredo
- Marco Muñoz as Investigator
- Raúl Macías as Kid Dinamita
- Roberto "Flaco" Guzmán as Jimmy
- Roberto Tello as Silvio
- Rocío Yaber as Francisco's mother
- Sylvia Valdés as Martha
- Roger Cudney as Mr. Jones
- Rubén Morales as Ofelia's father
- Tania Prado as Lorena
- Alexandra Graña as Daniela
- Jan as Julio

== Soundtrack ==
Amigas y Rivales

Soundtrack album by Various artists
- Released: 2001
- Genre: Pop
- Length: 37:17
- Label: Fonovisa Records

No.	Title	Writer(s)	Length
1.	"Amigas y Rivales" (Kabah)	Aureo Baqueiro Guillén, Daniela Magun Knupfelmacher, Janine Quijano Tapia, Héctor Quijano Tapia, Karla García Melgarejo, María José, René Ortiz Martínez, Sergio Ortiz OeFarril	4:13
2.	"Entre Amigas" (Johnny Lozada)	Amaury López	3:21
3.	"Vuelvo a Intentar" (Angélica Vale)	Angélica Vale, Luis Reynoso Gongora	4:10
4.	"No Sabes Cuanto" (Alex Sirvent, Ximena Pichel)	Alex Sirvent	3:42
5.	"Amigas y Rivales" (Alex Sirvent)	Alex Sirvent, Raúl Cortes Ruelas	3:08
6.	"Que Pasó" (Johnny Lozada)	Johnny Lozada	4:00
7.	"Vuelvo a Intentar (Version Merengue)" (Angélica Vale)	Angélica Vale, Luis Reynoso Gongora	3:52
8.	"Ellas" (Arath de la Torre)	Alex Sirvent	3:57
9.	"Amigas y Rivales" (Angélica Vale)	Angélica Vale, Luis Reynoso Gongora	3:37
10.	"Al Ataque Feo" (Gabriel Soto)	Alex Sirvent	3:14

== Awards and nominations ==
Year	Award	Category	Nominee	Result
2002	20th TVyNovelas Awards	Best Antagonist Actress	Joana Benedek	Nominated
2002	20th TVyNovelas Awards	Best Leading Actor	Eric del Castillo	Won
2002	20th TVyNovelas Awards	Best Supporting Actor	Rafael Inclán	Nominated
2002	20th TVyNovelas Awards	Best Female Revelation	Angélica Vale	Nominated
2002	20th TVyNovelas Awards	Best Male Revelation	Gabriel Soto	Won
2002	Bravo Awards	Best Leading Actor	Eric del Castillo	Won
2002	El Heraldo de México Awards	Male Revelation	Gabriel Soto	Won
