= Tamara (2016 Venezuelan film) =

2016 Venezuelan film

- Film poster
- Directed by: Elia Schneider
- Written by: Fernando Butazzoni; Elia Schneider
- Starring: Luis Fernández; Prakriti Maduro; Mimí Lazo; Karina Velásquez; Carlota Sosa; Julie Restifo; Alberto Alifa; Tamara Adrián
- Cinematography: Petr Cikhart
- Music by: Osvaldo Montes
- Distributed by: Joel Films; Unity Films Inc
- Release date: 4 November 2016 (Venezuela)
- Running time: 110 minutes
- Country: Venezuela
- Language: Spanish

Tamara is a 2016 Venezuelan romantic drama film directed by Elia Schneider. The film is about a lawyer who takes the decision to start a gender transition. It is inspired by the life of Tamara Adrián, the first transgender person elected to the National Assembly of Venezuela and the second transgender member of a national legislature in the Americas. It became the highest-grossing film in Venezuela in 2016.

== Plot ==
The film revolves around Teo, a successful lawyer and university professor, married and with two children, who decides to start a gender transition.

== Cast ==
- Luis Fernandez as Tamara / Teo
- Prakiti Maduro as Ana
- Mimi Lazo as Elena
- Karina Velasquez as Maria Isabel
- Carlota Sosa as profesora Avelino
- Julie Restifo as isabela
- Alberto Alifa
- Leandro Arvelo
- Francisco Denis

== Production ==
Schneider tried to present the film as a representation of transphobia and not as a biographical film. Although key moments of the life of the politician remained, the script was rewritten several times to conceal aspects of her life. According to Tamara Adrián, around 40% of the film was reality, while the rest was fiction. Luis Fernández, the actor that depicted Teo, said that it was the most difficult role of his career and that it was the first time that he interpreted a woman. Fernández met with Tamara herself to design the character. At the end he decided not to imitate her, but rather tried to express how he would have felt in a similar situation.

Despite being filmed in 2013, Tamara was screened in November 2016 after delayals due to artistic decisions, the devaluation of the Venezuelan currency and afterwards due to the government's decision to limit the power schedule in malls.

Tamara Adrián made a cameo in the film with the role of a university rector.

== Reception ==
Upon release, 19,341 tickets were sold in Venezuela by 27 November, surpassing From Afar, awarded with the Golden Lion at the 72nd Venice International Film Festival, which sold 16,924 tickets during its time at the cinemas.

The film received a recognition by the Ibero American General Secretariat (SEGIB) for its script and was selected in a list of the 14 best movies screened at the International Film Festival of India. It was also awarded with the San Bárbara Festival Best Film Nueva Vision Award for Spain/Latin American Cinema. The film was nominated to nine MIFF Awards at the Milan Film Festival.

== See also ==
- Venezuelan LGBT+ cinema
