= Francisco de Miranda (film) =

- Film poster
- Directed by: Diego Rísquez
- Starring: Luis Fernández
- Production company: Producciones Guakamaya
- Release date: 2006
- Country: Venezuela
- Language: Spanish

Francisco de Miranda is a Venezuelan film on the life of Venezuelan independence hero Francisco de Miranda. It was released in Venezuela in August 2006, opening at forty cinemas, and beating Superman Returns at the box office.

== Cast ==
- Luis Fernández : Francisco de Miranda
- Ralph Kinnard : Pitt
- Luke Grande : Conde Floridablanca
- Ruddy Rodriguez
- Flavia Gleske
- Mimi Lazo as Miranda Mother
- Jean Carlos Simancas
- Leandro Arvelo as Young Miranda
- Malena Gonzalez
- Marlene De Andrade
- Jean Carlos Simancas as Miranda father
- Antonio Cuevas as Juan German Roscio
- Armando Gota
- Luis Chataing
- Antonio Delli
- Vicente Peña as Spanish Coronel
- Armando Zambrano
- Anibal Grunn

== See also ==
- Miranda Returns (2007), an unrelated film on Miranda released the following year
