= La mujer de Lorenzo =

- Genre: telenovela drama
- Created by: Alejandra Rodríguez
- Written by: Pablo Vasquez
- Directed by: Toño Vega Espejo; Luis Barrios De La Puente
- Starring: Adriana Louvier; Guillermo Pérez; Carolina Tejera; Yul Bürkle; Andrea Montenegro; Camucha Negrete
- Opening theme: "Solo Por Ti" by Soraya (musician)
- Countries of origin: Venezuela; Peru
- Original language: Spanish
- No. of episodes: 100

Production
- Executive producer: Margarita Morales Macedo
- Production locations: Lima, Peru
- Running time: 41-44 minutes
- Production company: Venevisión

Original release
- Network: Venevisión; Univision
- Release: May 15 – September 20, 2003

La mujer de Lorenzo (Lorenzo's Wife) is a 2003 telenovela produced by Venezuelan production company Venevisión in conjunction with Peruvian production company Iguana Producciones. Venezuelan actor Guillermo Pérez and Mexican actress Adriana Louvier star as the main protagonists while Carolina Tejera, Yul Bürkle, and Andrea Montenegro star as the main antagonists.

== Plot ==
In the eyes of those around them, Laurita and Lorenzo appear to have a successful marriage. Lorenzo is a wealthy and well-educated man who runs his own fashion house, while Laurita is portrayed as a beautiful and elegant woman who is considered well suited to him.

However, the truth is that Laurita is bored with her marriage, and she begins an affair with Alex (Yul Bürkle) a shameless and attractive opportunist who seduces rich women through his job as a personal trainer. Laurita is convinced that she is in love with Alex, and she makes the difficult decision of leaving Lorenzo. But her lawyer reminds her that the pre-nuptial agreement she signed will leave her penniless if she files for a divorce. Not willing to give up the luxurious life she is accustomed to, she hatches out a plan to make Lorenzo fall in love with another woman. The perfect candidate is Silvia, a pretty, simple and sweet young woman working as Lorenzo's assistance. Through the help of her Giacomo, her designer friend, she befriends Silvia and slowly transforms her into the type of woman that Lorenzo can fall in love with.

After spending time with each other, Lorenzo and Sylvia begin to fall in love with each other. But things aren't that simple, since Silvia is in love with Alex who has been her boyfriend for years. Furthermore, Isabela, Lorenzo's former fiancee, arrives from abroad with intentions of taking over Lorenzo's company as an act of revenge against Lorenzo and Laurita. Along the way, Alex also becomes Isabela's lover and Silvia and Lorenzo finally admit their love for each other. Seeing that she is about to lose everything, Laurita changes her mind and starts her plan to recover Lorenzo's love. Which among the three women will win in the end?

== Cast ==
- Adriana Louvier as Silvia Estevez
- Guillermo Pérez as Lorenzo Valezuela
- Carolina Tejera as Laurita Benavides Valezuela
- Andrea Montenegro as Isabela Fergoni
- Yul Bürkle as Alex Zambrano
- Milene Vásquez as Natalia "Nati"
- Camucha Negrete as Emparatriz Negrete
- Eduardo Cesti as Conan
- José Luis Ruiz as Giacomo Volicelli
- Leslie Stewart
- Xavier Pimentel
- Oscar Beltrán
- Ximena Diaz
- Elizabeth Córdova
- Javier Lobatón
- María Fe Fuentes
