= La candidata (film) =

- Film caption
- Directed by: Ronald Rivas
- Release date: 2021
- Running time: 78 minutes
- Country: Venezuela
- Language: Spanish

La candidata (lit. 'The candidate') is a Venezuelan documentary film directed by Ronald Rivas Casallas and Emil Guevara Malavé, and released in 2021. The film tells the story of several contestants in the Miss Gay Venezuela pageant.

== Plot ==
The documentary features Eduardo Ramírez, Yawaldo Nieves, Dayana Aglerth, Argenis González and Daniela Blanco Valera, who participate in the 2015 edition of the Miss Gay Venezuela beauty pageant. Throughout the film, the protagonists narrate their stories of self-discovery and affirmation of their sexual orientation and gender identity. Likewise, La candidata explores the concept of gender and the participants' stories of overcoming, as well as their different life contexts.

== Production and reception ==
The idea of developing a documentary about the beauty pageant arose after Emil Guevara was part of the production of a reality show associated with Miss Gay Venezuela, which allowed him to discover the "world of the construction of beauty" embodied by the contestants; the filmmaker considers the film to be one of the most significant stories he has made in his career as a documentary filmmaker. According to the filmmakers, the protagonists of La candidata "have faced sanctions of how they should be men and how they should not be women."

The documentary film, a Venezuelan-Mexican co-production, premiered at the Guadalajara International Film Festival on 5 October 2021, where it competed for the Maguey Award. The documentary was presented at the XX Venezuelan Film Festival, held in Margarita in June 2024, where it was awarded the prize for Best Documentary Feature Film.

== See also ==
- Venezuelan LGBTQ cinema
