= Adriana Louvier =

Mexican actress and presenter

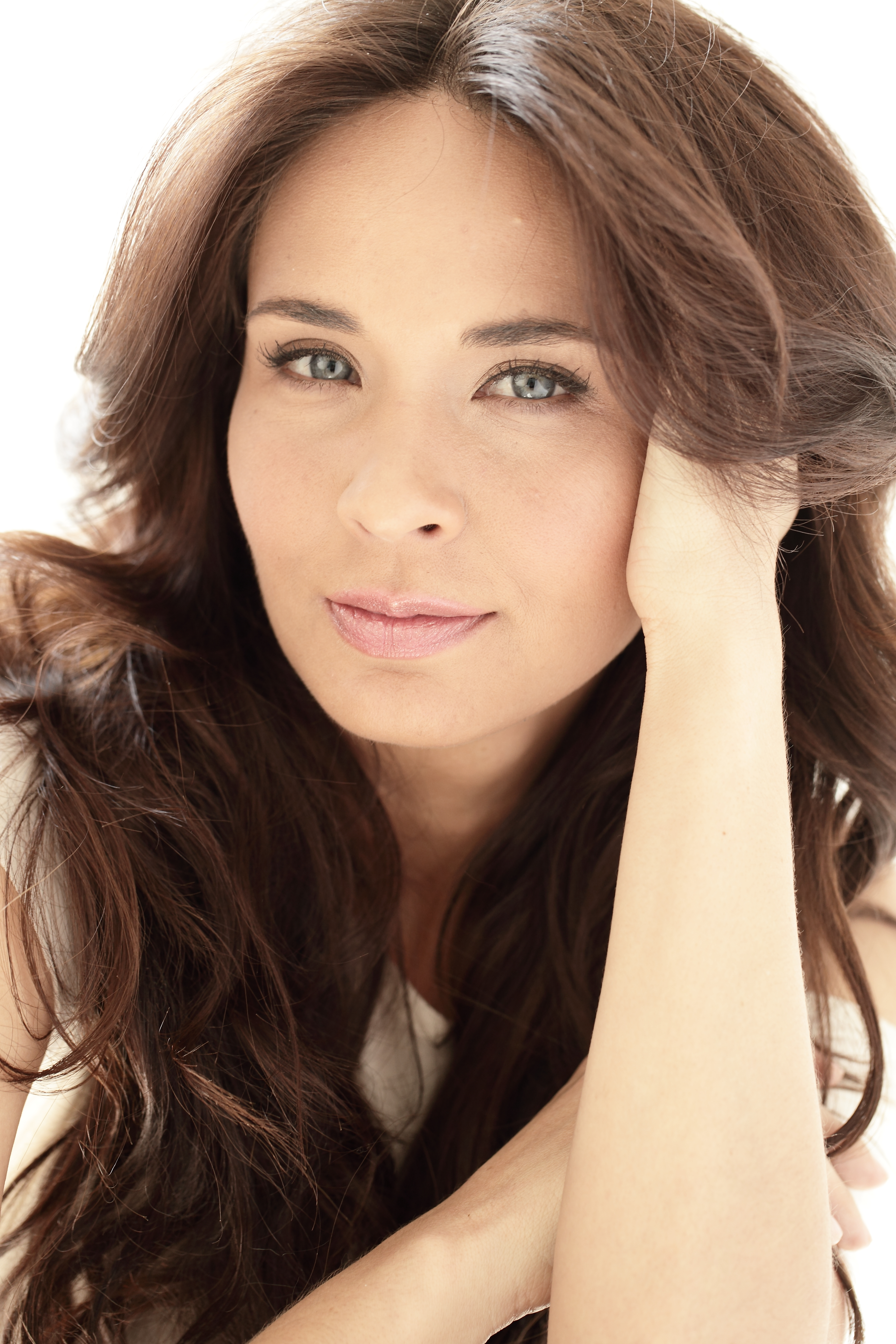
- Born: Adriana Louvier Vargas; September 18, 1980 (age 45); Mexico City, Mexico
- Occupations: Actress; TV presenter
- Years active: 2000-present

Adriana Louvier Vargas (born September 18, 1980), known artistically as Adriana Louvier, is a Mexican television actress and presenter.

== Life ==
Louvier began acting as a lead actress with a television screen debut in La mujer de Lorenzo (2003), followed by roles in Amor en custodia (2005). She participated in Emperatriz (2011), Corona de lágrimas (2012) and Quiero amarte (2013). Her most important roles have been in Yo no creo en los hombres (2014), Sin rastro de ti (2016), and her most recent telenovela Caer en tentación (2017).

== Filmography ==
=== Films ===
Year	Title	Role	Notes
2005	Yo también te quiero	Tania	Short film
2010	Adiós mundo cruel	Claudia	
2011	Amar no es querer	Jackie	
2011	Toda la suerte del mundo	Elena	Short film
2012	Hidden Moon	Apolonia	
2013	Sobre ella	Sandra	
2014	Fachon Models	Carolina	
2014	Más negro que la noche	María	
2015	Ilusiones S.A.	Isabel	Post-production
2018	Recuperando a mi ex	Laura	
2022	Two Plus Two	Sara	

=== Television ===
Year	Title	Role	Notes
2000	Golpe bajo	Lluvia	Television debut
2001	Uroboros	Gloria	TV mini-series
2002	Tal para cual		
2002	Sin permiso de tus padres		
2002	Lo que es el amor	Julieta Rivas	Recurring role
2003	La mujer de Lorenzo	Silvia	Lead role
2003	Enamórate	Pato	Recurring role
2004	La heredera	Linda	Recurring role
2005	Top Models	Carla Oliver del Río / Cossy del Río	Recurring role
2005	Ni una vez más	Jazmin	Recurring role
2005	Pasiones prohibidas	Tatiana	Recurring role
2006	Ángel, las alas del amor	Celeste	Lead role
2008	Tengo todo	Stephie	Recurring role
2011	Emperatriz	Esther Mendoza del Real	Co-lead role
2012-2013	Corona de lágrimas	Olga Ancira	Lead role
2013-2014	Quiero amarte	Constanza	Co-lead role
2014-2015	Yo no creo en los hombres	María Dolores	Lead role
2015	Yo no creo en los hombres, el origen	María Dolores	Television film
2016	Sin rastro de ti	Julia	Lead role
2017-2018	Caer en tentación	Carolina	Lead role
2021	Madre sólo hay dos	Fernanda	
2022	La mujer del diablo	Soledad Insulza	
2023	Pacto de silencio	Fernanda Alarcón	
2025	Pecados inconfesables	Fedra De Baar	
2026	Hermanas, un amor compartido	Mónica	Lead role

== Awards and nominations ==
=== Premios TVyNovelas ===
Year	Category	Telenovela	Result
2013	Favorite Villain	Corona de Lágrimas	Nominated
2015	Best Actress	Yo no creo en los hombres	Won
2017	Best Actress	Sin rastro de ti	Nominated

=== Festival Pantalla de cristal (México) ===
Year	Category	Telenovela	Result
2012	Best Actress	Amar no es querer	Nominated
