= Joana Benedek =

Romanian-born Mexican actress

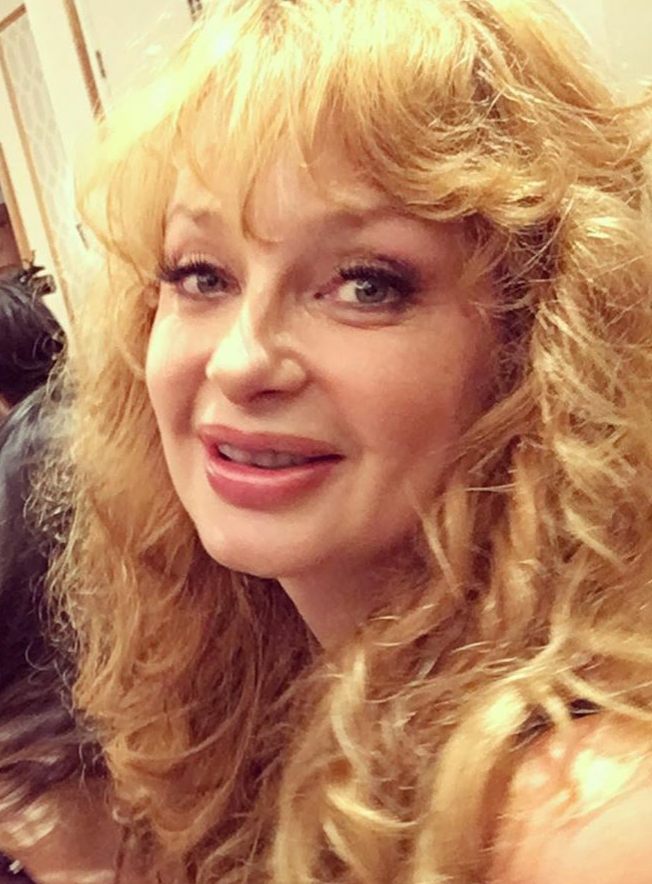
- Born: Roxana Joana Benedek Godeanu; January 21, 1972 (age 54); Bucharest, Romania
- Citizenship: Romania; Mexico
- Occupations: Model, actress
- Years active: 1988-present
- Relatives: Raluca (sister)

Joana Benedek (Spanish: [ɟʝoˈana βeneˈðek], Romanian: [ˈʒo̯ana beneˈdek]; born Roxana Joana Benedek Godeanu on January 21, 1972) is a Romanian-Hungarian and Mexican actress.

She is born from a mix Hungarian-Romanian family. She left her native land in 1987 fleeying from Nicolae Ceausescu's communist regime in search of work. She first moved to Venezuela where she married shortly after arrived and lived there 11 years before moving to Mexico in 1999. In Caracas she continued to study, but later left her studies to work as a model and playing several telenovela characters. In 1997 she signed a contract with a prestigious cosmetics company in New York City. During her stay in the city, she decided to study acting in the Academy of Susan Grace.

She was later discovered by a Mexican producer, which began her career as an actress in telenovelas in 1999. Sirena, Amigas y Rivales, and Angela are some of the melodramas in which the actress has participated.

== Filmography ==
Year	Title	Role	Notes
1989	Rubi Rebelde	Zoraida	Antagonist
1992-93	Piel	Sandra	Supporting role
1993	Sirena	Joana "La Divina"	Supporting role
1994	Cruz de nadie	Cynara	Supporting role
1995-97	Pecado de Amor	Rosalía Alamo	Main antagonist
1998-99	Angela	Catalina Lizárraga	Antagonist
1999-00	Mujeres Engañadas	Johana Sierra	Supporting role
2001	Amigas y rivales	Roxana Brito de de la O / Carolina Vallejo	Main antagonist
2003	De pocas, pocas pulgas	Reneé de Lastra	Protagonist
2005-06	Barrera de amor	Leonela	Special appearance
2006-07	La Fea Más Bella	Cristina Riva Palacio	Special appearance
2007	Destilando Amor	Pamela Torreblanca	Supporting role
2009-10	Hasta Que El Dinero Nos Separe	Marian Celeste	Supporting role
2011-12	Dos Hogares	Yolanda Riva Palacio	Antagonist
2019	Noches con Platanito	Herself	

== Awards and nominations ==
=== Premios TVyNovelas ===
Year	Category	Telenovela	Result
2002	Best Female Antagonist	Amigas y Rivales	Nominated
