= Rubí rebelde =

- Genre: Telenovela; Romance; Drama
- Created by: Inés Rodena
- Written by: Carlos Romero; Perla Farías; María Antonieta Gómez; Boris Izaguirre
- Directed by: Humberto Morales; Tito Rojas; Renato Gutiérrez
- Starring: Mariela Alcalá; Jaime Araque; Joana Benedek
- Opening theme: "A menos que tú" by Mariela Alcalá
- Country of origin: Venezuela
- Original language: Spanish
- No. of episodes: 172

Production
- Executive producer: Genaro Escobar
- Producer: Daniel Andrade
- Production company: RCTV

Original release
- Network: RCTV
- Release: February 1989 – October 1989

Related
- Yo no creo en los hombres (1991); Velo de novia (2003); Yo no creo en los hombres (2014)

Rubi Rebelde (Rebellious Ruby) is a 1989 Venezuelan telenovela produced by Radio Caracas Televisión based on the radionovelas La gata and Enamorada by Cuban author Inés Rodena. This version was written by Carlos Romero, Perla Farías, María Antonieta Gómez and Boris Izaguirre. This telenovela lasted 172 episodes and was distributed internationally by RCTV International.

Mariela Alcalá and Jaime Araque starred as the main protagonists with Yajaira Orta (then Dalila Colombo), Adolfo Cubas and Inés María Calero as the main antagonists.

== Synopsis ==
The slums held no apparent future for Rubi, a young girl abandoned and exploited. Victor lives on the other side of town from Rubi. A minor accident brings them together, sparking an instant attraction. Víctor's family is torn by secret ambitions and bitterness. His mother is an angry woman full of resentment. She battles a hostile relationship with Victor's paternal grandmother, who controls the family's wealth. Victor's brother, with his villainous ideas and evil notions, is much like his mother. His younger sister, the sweet Virginia, is blind. Victor is outstanding, both kind and warmhearted, and Rubi is induced by him to enter the family home. His concern is misinterpreted by Rubi as love for her. To make matters worse, Rubi is despised by Victor's mother. His grandmother, however, finds her charm and innocence touching. To avenge her spiteful daughter-in-law, the grandmother changes her will to name Rubi sole benefactor. Now potentially wealthy, Rubi is thrust into an unknown world, one in which she will again be compelled to fight to survive.

== Cast ==
- Mariela Alcala as Rubi
- Jaime Araque as Víctor Alfonso Miranda
- Ricardo Herranz as Francisco
- Alejandro Delgado as Reynaldo Itturralde
- Maria Teresa Acosta as Leonor Miranda
- Haydee Balza as La China
- Joana Benedek as Zoraida
- Jose Daniel Bort as Tilico
- Inés María Calero as Gladys
- Yajaira Orta+Dalila Colombo as Lucrecia de Miranda
- Adolfo Cubas as Nelson
- Isabel Herrera as Macorina
- Ileana Jacket as Carolina
- Adelaida Mora as Virginia
- Frank Moreno as Sabatino
- René Muñoz as Padre Martin
- Jorge Palacios as Leonardo
- Carolina Perpetuo as Ana María
- Rosario Prieto as Dorila
- Victoria Roberts as Meche
- Marcelo Romo as Felix
- Carlota Sosa as Carmela
- Vicente Tepedino as Fabián
- Maria Bosco as Giustina(Hermina)
- Alberto Marin as Emilio Castro

== Remake ==
Nathalie Lartilleux remade Rubi Rebelde in 2014 along with the 1970 Mexican telenovela La Gata into a new telenovela called La Gata, and Maite Perroni and Daniel Arenas starred as the protagonists.
