= Hay amores que matan =

- Genre: Telenovela
- Created by: Carlos Pérez
- Written by: Carlos Pérez; Basilio Álvarez; José Manuel Peláez; Ana Carolina López; Ariana Martín
- Directed by: Renato Gutiérrez
- Starring: Carolina Tejera; Luis Fernandez; Carlos Cámara Jr. Gledys Ibarra
- Opening theme: "Traigo una Pena/Te Veo Venir, Soledad" by Franco de Vita
- Country of origin: Venezuela
- Original language: Spanish
- No. of episodes: 120

Production
- Executive producer: Víctor Fernández
- Producer: Marco Godoy
- Production location: Caracas
- Production company: RCTV

Original release
- Network: RCTV
- Release: March 15 – September 19, 2000

Related
- Carita Pintada; Mis 3 Hermanas

Hay amores que matan is a Venezuelan telenovela written by Carlos Pérez and produced by Radio Caracas Televisión in 2000. This telenovela lasted 120 episodes and was distributed internationally by RCTV International. In international broadcasts it was also known as Amanda, hay amores que matan.

Carolina Tejera and Luis Fernandez starred as the main protagonists.

== Synopsis ==
In 1975, three young reporters and a priest are investigating criminal acts tied to Gumersindo Montenegro, a rising politician. Twenty-five years later, two children born from this tragedy – Gumersindo’s son Cesár Augusto, and Amanda, raised by Father Tejedor – are shocked by a second murder of vengeance. Their story touches many others. There is Mónica Montenegro, whose loveless marriage leads to a dangerous search for the truth. Aleluya Sotomayor, a former prostitute who escapes her past only to confront the painful destiny of her daughter. María Solita, a naive but talented youth cruelly torn from her one true love. And Emma de Castro León, the glamorous wealthy widow whose nightmares of sexual slavery somehow envelop her. Amanda is the story of five women and how the power of love – the one constant in all their lives – changes everything they think they know, challenges everything they believe to be right.

== Cast ==
- Carolina Tejera as Amanda Santacruz
- Luis Fernandez as Cesar Augusto Montenegro
- Carlos Camara as Saturno Guzman
- Gledys Ibarra as Aleluya Sotomayor
- Franklin Virguez as Fredimatico Gonzalez
- Julie Restifo as Emma de Castro Leon
- Carlos Olivier as Gumersindo Montenegro
- Jennifer Rodriguez as Lucia Castro Leon
- Alba Roversi as Ifigenia Barreto
- Roberto Moll as Pancho Tejedor
- Alicia Plaza as Monica de Montenegro
- Juan Carlos Alarcon as Machoflaco
- Ambar Diaz as Maria Solita
- Alfonso Medina as José Humbertico Alcántara
- Flor Elena González as Elpidia
- Marcos Moreno as El Indio
- Juan Carlos Gardie as Charles Luis Viscaya Segundo
- Reina Hinojosa as Carmen Felicia Lozado
- Hans Cristopher as Alfredo Azcarate
- Leonardo Marrero as Argimiro
- Margarita Hernandez as Eva Santacruz
- Mirela Mendoza as Daniela
- Rebeca Aleman as Blanquita
- Martin Brassesco as Jean Franco
