= My 3 Sisters =

Telenovela

- Genre: Telenovela
- Created by: Perla Farías
- Screenplay by: José Vicente Quintana; Luis Colmenares; Rossana Negrín
- Directed by: Nicolás Di Blasi; Tony Rodríguez
- Creative director: Erasmo Colón
- Starring: Scarlet Ortiz; Ricardo Álamo; Roxana Díaz; Carlos Cruz
- Theme music composer: Omar Alfanno
- Opening theme: "A Puro Dolor" by Son by Four
- Composer: Rómulo Gallegos
- Country of origin: Venezuela
- Original language: Spanish
- No. of episodes: 150

Production
- Executive producer: Carmen Cecilia Urbaneja
- Producers: Jose Gerardo Guillén; María Eugenia Nuñez; Alejandro Sánchez; Juan Marcos Rojas; Moises Medina
- Production location: Caracas
- Cinematography: Ignacio González; Juan González
- Editor: Ray Suárez
- Camera setup: Multi-camera
- Production company: Radio Caracas Televisión

Original release
- Network: RCTV
- Release: 26 April – 21 November 2000

Related
- Hay amores que matan

Mis 3 hermanas (English title: My 3 Sisters) is a Venezuelan telenovela written by Perla Farías and produced by RCTV in 2000.

Scarlet Ortiz and Ricardo Alamo starred as the main protagonists with Roxana Diaz as the main antagonist; Carlos Cruz, Dad Dager, Chantal Baudaux starred as co-protagonists.

== Plot ==
Augusto (Carlos Cruz) and his three sisters Silvia "La Generala", Lisa "La Perfecta" and Beatriz "La Beba" were practically left as orphans after the death of their mother and the unknown whereabouts of their father who abandoned them years ago. Now, Augusto had to place his dreams on hold in order to support his siblings. Now Augusto works as a building materials sales manager at his uncle's company where he works with his wife Margarita (Roxana Diaz) a selfish and ambitious woman who is tired of Augusto's constant support for his sisters and their lack of economic stability. Margarita sets her eyes on Santiago (Ricardo Álamo), a handsome engineer who works to shut down the medical clinic where Lisa (Scarlet Ortiz) works. Lisa and Santiago fall in love with each other. But the problem facing their relationship is that Santiago is engaged to marry Barbara, daughter of Ernesto who is Santiago's boss.

== Cast ==
=== Starring ===
- Scarlet Ortiz as Lisa Estrada Morandi: Medical nurse studying to become a doctor, Augusto's, Silvia's and Beatriz's sister, Margarita's sister-in-law, Jacinto's daughter, Vicente's god-daughter, Santiago's lover. Marries Santiago at the end of the show.
- Ricardo Álamo as Santiago Ortega Díaz: Architect at Solís Construction, Barbara's fiancee, Margarita's one-night stand, Lisa's lover, Eloiza's son. Marries Lisa at the end of the show.
- Roxana Díaz as Margarita Álvarez de Estrada: Construction sales person, Augusto's wife, Santiago's one-night stand.
- Carlos Cruz as Augusto Estrada Morandi: Margarita's dedicated husband, brother to Silvia, Lisa and Beartiz, Jacinto's son. Later married to Barbara, Vicente's god-son. Marries Barbara at the end of the show.

=== Also starring ===
- Roberto Moll as Jacinto Estrada / Jaime Contreras: Augusto, Silvia, Lisa and Beatriz's long-lost father, Delia's husband, famous medical doctor.
- Dad Dáger as Silvia: Former housewife and later advertising executive. Carlos dedicated wife, mother of twin daughters. Elder sister to Lisa and Beatriz.
- Ricardo Bianchi as Carlos Salas: Theatre actor, Silvia's dedicated husband, Augusto, Lisa and Beatriz's brother-in-law.
- Chantal Baudaux as Beatriz / La Beba: Youngest child of the Estrada family, high school student, Francisco's girlfriend. Marries Francisco at the end of the show.
- Jonathan Montenegro as Francisco Moreno: La Beba's love interest, Roberto's enemy.
- Marlene De Andrade as Barbara Solis Quintero: Ernesto and Sofia's daughter, Anibal's sister, dedicated friend of Isabel, Santiago's fiancee. Marries Augusto at the end of the show.
- Yul Bürkle as Anibal Solís Quintero: Son of Ernesto and Sofia, Barbara's older brother, Isabel's former lover, obsessed with Lisa. Goes to jail for Augusto's attempted murder.
- Yoel Borges as Roberto Giovanni: Don Giovanni's son, worker at Giovanni pizzeria, member of local gang, Beatriz's boyfriend, hates Francisco.
- Mirela Mendoza as Isabel Méndez: Art gallery owner, Barbara's best friend, Anibal's former lover, in love with Augusto.
- Rodolfo Renwick as Javier: Gym trainer, Santiago's best friend.
- Jerónimo Gil as Dr. Gustavo Martínez: Doctor at clinic, in love with Lisa.
- Virginia Lancaster as Mimí

=== Special participation ===
- Manuel Salazar as Ernesto Solís: Owner of Solís Construction, Sofia's wife, father to Anibal and Barbara.
- Flor Elena González as Delia Contreras: Dedicated wife of Jacinto, medical laboratory specialist.
- Marisela Buitriago as Sofía Quintero de Solís: Socialite, Ernesto's wife, mother to Anibal and Barbara, Álvaro's lover.
- Antonio Cuevas as Vicente Quintana: God-father to Augusto, Silvia, Lisa and Beatriz.
- Luis Alberto de Mozos as Álvaro Galindez: Lawyer to the Solís family, Ernesto's friend and adviser, Sofia's lover.
- Gioia Lombardini as Eloiza Díaz Ortega: Mother of Santiago.
- Verónica Cortés as Ángela Morandi de Estrada
- Samuel González as Augusto Estrada Morandi

=== Recurring ===
- Gabriela Santeliz as Anabel
- César Bencid as Dr. Serpa
- José Félix Cárdenas as Germán
- Víctor Rosa-Branco as Ernesto Solano
- Gerardo Soto as Iván Gil
- Aura Rivas as Ligia Díaz
