= La llaman Mariamor =

- Genre: Telenovela; Romance; Drama
- Created by: Crucita Torres
- Written by: Sylvia Vergara; Zaret Romero; Iris Dubs; Basilio Álvarez
- Directed by: Luis Alberto Lamata
- Starring: Roxana Díaz; Pedro Lander; Julie Restifo; Saúl Marín
- Opening theme: Es que eres tú by Rudy La Scala
- Country of origin: Venezuela
- Original language: Spanish
- No. of episodes: 181

Production
- Producers: Víctor Fernández; Vladimir Salazar
- Production company: Marte Televisión

Original release
- Network: Marte Televisión
- Release: 14 April 1996 – 24 March 1997

Related
- Cruz de nadie

La Llaman Mariamor (They Call Her Mariamor) is a Venezuelan telenovela created by Crucita Torres and produced by Marte Televisión in 1996. The telenovela lasted for 181 episodes.

Roxana Díaz, Pedro Lander and Saúl Marín starred as the protagonists with Julie Restifo as the antagonist.

== Synopsis ==
La Llaman Mariamor (They Call Her Mariamor) is the story of Beba Marturano, a charming young woman and recent graduate with a degree in architecture. Beba has always lived in a comfortable life, her only suffering has been the loss of her father, Tomas Marturano. She first lost him when he divorced her mother, and again when he died in a suspicious accident far away from her. Beba grew up tormented by the hate her mother, Emerita, had instilled in her toward Mara Marturano and Brando Leon. She was led to believe that Mara and Brando were responsible for her father's dead. When destiny and Mara unite, Beba suffers an accident and lose her memory. During her bout amnesia, she falls in love with the man she hates most- Brando Leon. By the time she recovers, she has fallen completely in love with Brando. Their love is a seemingly impossible love because she is already married to Urbano Duran, a humble laborer who is consumed by a fervent jealously; Urbano suffers from a severe inferiority complex because he erroneously believes that his humble background and lack of education make him a lesser man in the eyes of Beba. As a result, he doubts his wife's love and sincerity. Eventually, Beba learns that Brando, deceived by Mara, was not her father's murder. She also discovers that Urbano, who has since graduated with a degree in engineering, has manipulated by Mara into believing a pack of lies which has led to his jealously. In the end, Beba is forced to choose between the two men who have played the most important role in her life: Brando Leon or Urbano Duran...

== Cast ==
- Roxana Díaz as Beba Marturano
- Pedro Lander as Brando Leon
- Julie Restifo as Mara Marturano
- Saúl Marínas Urbano Duran
- Loly Sanchez as Emerita Aristigueta
- Lourdes Valera as Francesca Aristigueta
- Miguel Ferrari as Yago Monteverde
- Carlos Marquez
- Yul Bürkle as Willy
- Deyalit Lopez as Azucena
- Nacarid Escalona
- Winston Vallenilla as Jhonny
- Alfonso Medina
- Jennifer Milano
- Ana Karina Casanova
- Juan Carlos Gardie
- Nacho Huett
- Elaiza Gil
- Rhandy Piñango
- Eric Noriega
