= Amor del bueno =

- Genre: Telenovela
- Created by: Creative Productions Center
- Developed by: Venevisión International
- Directed by: Toño Vega
- Starring: Coraima Torres; Ricardo Álamo; Karl Hoffman; Ana Karina Casanova
- Opening theme: "Amor del bueno" by Héctor Montaner
- Country of origin: Venezuela
- Original language: Spanish
- No. of episodes: 120

Production
- Executive producer: Juan Andrés Rodriguez
- Production company: Venevisión

Original release
- Network: Venevisión
- Release: June 2 – October 12, 2004

Amor del bueno is a 2004 telenovela produced by Venevisión and Iguana Productions. Venezuelan actors Coraima Torres and Ricardo Álamo star as the main protagonists.

== Plot ==
Monica is a beautiful woman and home-maker married to Javier, a cruel and arrogant man who is cheating on her with her best friend Carolina, an ambitious model who sees Javier as her ticket to achieving financial stability. On the other hand, Bernando is a distinguished journalist in the country who dedicates most of his time in his work and doesn't have time for love, until he meets Monica when they are unfortunately kidnapped by men who don't want Bernardo to publish a story involving powerful people in the country and expose their schemes.

== Cast ==
- Coraima Torres as Mónica Lezama
- Ricardo Álamo as Bernardo Valdez
- Karl Hoffman as Javier Lezama (villain)
- Denise Novell as Micaela
- Ana Karina Casanova as Sandra del Valle
- Ricardo Bianchi as Eleazar Romero
- Annabel Rivero as Carolina Moreau (villain)
- Juan Carlos Baena as Leonardo
- Everson Ruiz as Robert
- Maykell Barrientos
- Rodolfo Drago
- Isabel Ferrer
- Chony Fuentes
- William Goite
- Susy Herrera
- Trino Jimenez
- Carmen Landaeta
- Mildred Lozada
- Manuel Martinez
- Alejandro Mata as Emiliano Valdez
- Andreína Mazzeo
- Nicolas Montero as Gustavo León
- Juan Manuel Montesinos
- Elizabeth Morales
- Denise Novel as Micaela
