= Nacho Huett =

Venezuelan actor

- Born: Ignacio Huett; 3 March 1972 (age 53); Caracas, Venezuela
- Occupation: Actor
- Years active: 1996–present
- Children: 2

Ignacio Huett (born 3 March 1972 in Caracas, Venezuela) artistically known as Nacho Huett, is a Venezuelan television actor, compositor, and stage actor. He is best known in his native country for working in Radio Caracas Televisión's telenovelas. Huett has been based in Bogota, Colombia since 2016, with his wife, actress Nacarid Escalona and their two daughters.

== Filmography ==
=== Film roles ===
Year	Title	Roles	Notes
2007	Viandantes	Ernesto	Short film
2010	Sin cobertura	Juan	Short film
2011	Patas arriba	Young Renato	
2013	La ley	Oneki / Gladiona	

=== Television roles ===
Year	Title	Roles	Notes
1996	La llaman Mariamor		
1998	Hoy te vi	Iván Pereira Gómez	
1999	Carita pintada	Abdul Pabuena	
2000	Angélica pecado	Lucas	
2000	Mariú		
2001	La soberana	Ángel Ozores	
2002	Trapos íntimos	Ricky Pinzón	
2003	La mujer de Judas	Ismael Agüero del Toro	
2003	La Invasora	Guillermo	
2006	Por todo lo alto		
2006	El desprecio	Edilio Velandró	
2007	Mi prima Ciela	Cristóbal Acosta	
2009	Calle luna, Calle sol	Rafael Eduardo Garcia Mastronardi	
2013	Los secretos de Lucía	Oswaldo Orbajan "Orejas"	
2014	La virgen de la calle	Humberto Rivas Molina	
2014	Nora	Pedro	
2016	Entre tu amor y mi amor	Father Ramón Echezuría	
2017	El Comandante		2 episodes
