= Toda una dama =

- Genre: Telenovela
- Created by: Iris Dubs
- Based on: Señora by José Ignacio Cabrujas
- Screenplay by: José Manuel Peláez; Freddy Goncalves; Rafael Elizalde; Zaret Romero; Iris Dubs
- Story by: José Ignacio Cabrujas
- Directed by: Olegario Barrera
- Creative director: Dagoberto González
- Starring: Christina Dieckmann; Ricardo Álamo; Roberto Messutti; Nohely Arteaga
- Opening theme: "Mi segundo intento" performed by Reinaldo Álvarez
- Country of origin: Venezuela
- Original language: Spanish
- No. of episodes: 180

Production
- Executive producer: Carmen Cecilia Urbaneja
- Producers: Jose Gerardo Guillén; Jesenia Colmenarez; Dioglamar Seco
- Cinematography: José Rojas
- Editor: Alexis Montero
- Camera setup: Multi-camera

Original release
- Network: RCTV Internacional
- Release: November 7, 2007 – July 13, 2008

Toda una dama (English title:Quite a Lady) is a Venezuelan telenovela produced and broadcast by the RCTV network in 2007. It is an adaptation by Iris Dubs of the telenovela Señora, originally by the writer José Ignacio Cabrujas and broadcast by the same network between 1988 and 1989.

It stars Christina Dieckmann and Ricardo Álamo, along with Nohely Arteaga and Roberto Messuti in secondary roles.

It was the first telenovela made by RCTV after closing down its open signal in 2007. It premiered on November 7, 2007 at 10:00 p.m. m.. She was transferred at 9:00 p.m. m.. from December 18, 2007 at the end of Mi prima Ciela. When starting La Trepadora was moved again at 10:00 p.m. m.. and ended on July 13, 2008 with excellent ratings.

== Story ==
Valeria Aguirre's life has never been easy; she grew up as an orphan, not knowing anything about her origins, and as she got older, she got into trouble with the law because of her lack of finances. At eighteen, she is arrested for a minor shoplifting and ends up spending several years in jail, all because of Miguel Reyes, the prosecutor who took her case to court. Seven years later, a strange woman named Encarnación visits Valeria and tells her that she is the sister of Engracia (who is sick), the woman who raised her during her first years of life, she also visits Miguel and asks him to repair her injustice, unfortunately. a tragedy occurs, Marilyn, a violent prisoner decides to take revenge on Valeria for stabbing her and after a fight Valeria is temporarily blinded and Miguel, feeling guilty, visits her several times until he sets her free, on one of those visits Valeria falls in love with him for not being able to see it. After several situations (among them discovering that Dr. Diego is Miguel) she manages to be happy but only for a while since Engracia dies leaving her a role with a female name in which is the supposed key to her past, and with only that information she decides to find out his past. While she does so, several misadventures occur, including getting involved in a crime by accident, the death of Miguel's wife. However, Miguel, for his part, cannot forget Valeria and the two end up starting a stormy relationship full of misadventures. On the other hand, Imperio Laya De Trujillo, a powerful, irresistible and unscrupulous woman, hides a secret from her past. Obsessed with Miguel, she is willing to do anything to conquer him, so Valeria is an obstacle for her. Ignacio Caballero, who is Imperio's lover, leaves her to follow the object of her desire: Valeria. Abandoned by Ignacio and scorned by Miguel, Imperio's fury will be ruthless and cruel, and Valeria will lose everything but her dignity and her soul to discover the truth of her mysterious past, Imperio will try to destroy Valeria even after discovering that Valeria is the daughter he believed dead several years ago. At the age of 16, Imperio was practically sold to a man much older than her by her family, who abused her both psychologically and physically and even sexually to the point of getting her pregnant, and believing that Imperio had cheated on him, he decided to make the girl disappear by telling her that the baby was stillborn. In the end, Imperio manages to escape from him, and now with a great thirst for revenge and rejection towards all men, she uses her beauty and intelligence to destroy them, until she falls in love with Miguel. But he falls in love with her daughter instead. The anger, the lies, and the resentment caused by the thirst for revenge, will lead them all to take unexpected turns in the crossroads of the temptation to love.

== Cast ==
=== Starring ===
- Christina Dieckmann as Valeria Aguirre
- Ricardo Álamo as Miguel Reyes
- Roberto Messutti as Ignacio Caballeros
- Nohely Arteaga as Imperio Laya

=== Also starring ===
- Alfonso Medina as Lennin Márquez
- Ámbar Díaz as Deyanira Blanco
- Nacarid Escalona as Carmen 'La Leona' Barrios
- Luis Gerardo Núñez as Vicente Trujillo
- Guillermo Dávila as Juan 'JJ' José Reyes
- Abril Schreiber as Alejandra Trujillo Laya
- Carlos Felipe Álvarez as Juan Moreira
- María Gabriela de Faría as Helena Trujillo Laya Galván
- Reinaldo Zavarce as Guillermo 'Guille' Galván
- Samuel González as Padre Emilio Amado
- Sandra Martínez as Marilyn Monroy
- Laura Chimaras as Ashley Rincón
- Miguel Augusto Rodríguez as Lucas Gallardo
- Ana Castell as Encarnación Romero
- Virginia Urdaneta as Eleonora Laya
- Esperanza Magaz as Engracia Romero
- Emerson Rondón as Enrique Galván
- José Mantilla as Eloy Castro
- Aracelli Prieto as Adoración
- María Antonieta Ardila as Miranda de Rincón
- Alicia Hernández as Diosmary Toro
- Lolymar Sánchez as Coromoto Díaz
- Omaira Abinade as Berenice
- Relú Cardozo as La Cumbamba
- Carlos Herrera as Delgadito
- José Quijada as Calixto Rincón
- Gabriel Mantilla as Daniel Reyes Rincón

=== Special participation ===
- Mirela Mendoza as Lorena Rincón
- Yoletty Cabrera as Whitney

== Awards ==
In 2007, El Universo del Espectáculo awarded the best TV creations and by popular vote via the internet, they award "Toda una Dama" the following awards, despite the fact that said telenovela was broadcast on RCTV in pay signal, the Venezuelan public decided :
