= Recuperando a mi ex =

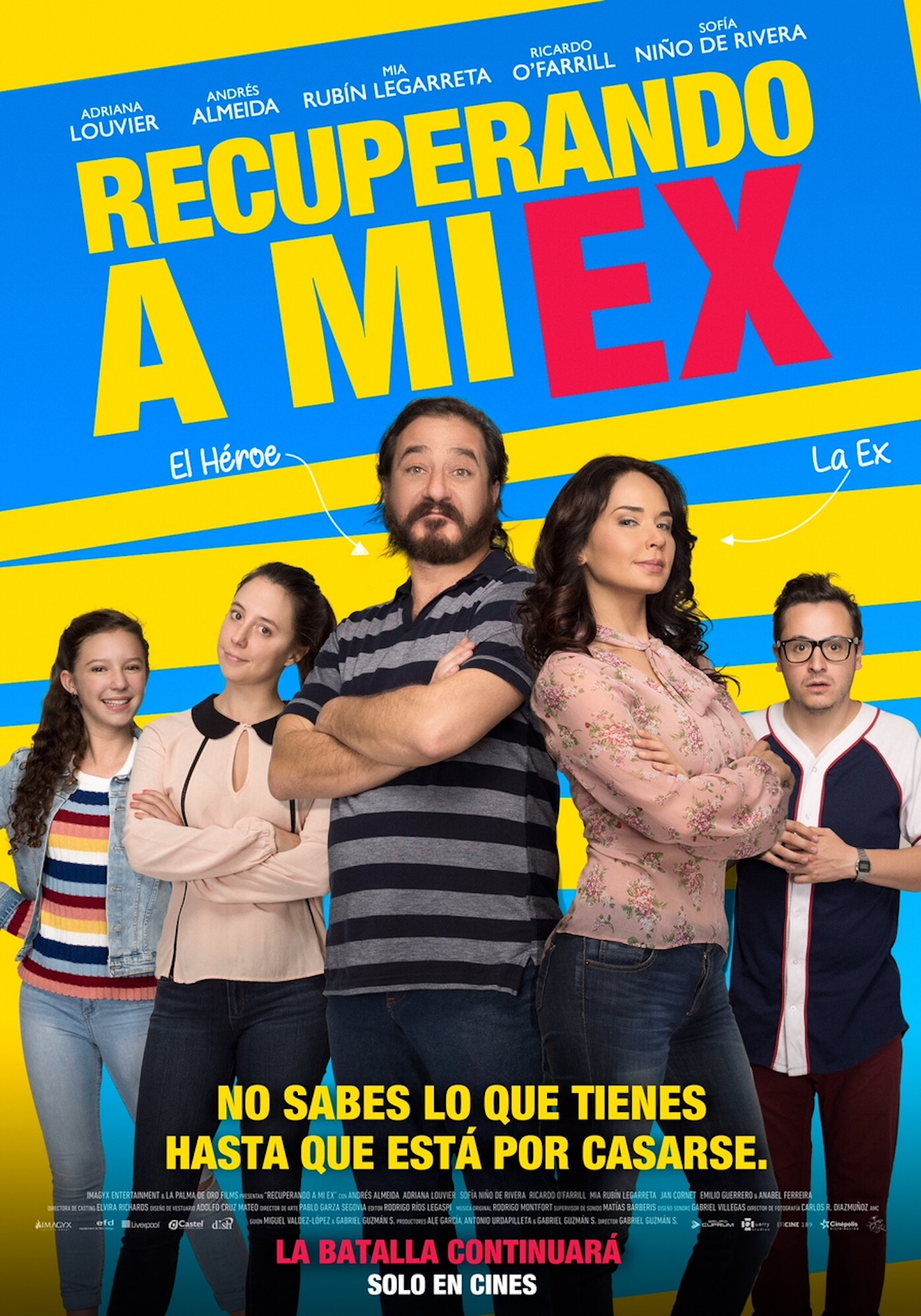
- Directed by: Gabriel Guzmán Sánchez
- Written by: Gabriel Guzmán Sánchez; Miguel Valdez-López
- Produced by: Ale García; Antonio Urdapilleta; Gabriel Guzmán Sánchez
- Starring: Andrés Almeida; Adriana Louvier; Mía Rubín Legarreta; Ricardo O'Farrill; Sofía Niño de Rivera; Anabel Ferreira; Jan Cornet
- Cinematography: Carlos Diazmunoz
- Edited by: Rodrigo Rios
- Music by: Rodrigo Montfort
- Production companies: IMAGYX Entertainment; La Palma de Oro
- Distributed by: Cinepolis Distribución
- Release date: 28 September 2018
- Running time: 95 minutes
- Country: Mexico
- Language: Spanish

Recuperando a mi ex (literally Getting my Ex Back) is a 2018 Mexican romantic comedy film written and directed by Gabriel Guzmán Sánchez. Shot in Mexico City and Monterrey, Mexico the summer of 2017, the film obtained the EFICINE incentive to begin production.

== Plot ==
When washed-out, has-been actor Francisco (Almeida), finds out that his ex-wife (Louvier) is about to remarry and take their daughter (Rubín Legarreta) to live abroad, he'll manipulate everyone around him to stop the wedding and get his family back.

== Cast ==
- Andrés Almeida - Francisco
- Adriana Louvier - Laura
- Mía Rubín Legarreta - Alicia
- Ricardo O'Farrill - Lamberto
- Sofía Niño de Rivera - Gabriela
- Anabel Ferreira - Catalina
- Jan Cornet - José Manuel
- Emilio Guerrero - Tornado
- Norma Angélica - Nilda Muñoz
- Martha Claudia Moreno - Linda Muñiz

== Production ==
Popular Mexican stand-up comedians like comedian and YouTube personalities like Samuel Fematt and Benshorts make cameo appearances in the film.

This is the film debut of popular comedian Ricardo O'Farrill.

This was the second film released in theaters in 2018 with comedian Sofía Niño de Rivera in the cast, after A Woman With No Filter was released in January of the same year.

It premiered in theaters with over 700 copies, above the average number for a Mexican film opening in Mexican theaters.

Some scenes were filmed outside the building located at number 44 Choapan Street, in the Condesa neighborhood, in the Cuauhtémoc borough of Mexico City.

== Reception ==
The film opened with favorable reviews that recommended it for abandoning stereotypes and including dialogue suitable for family viewing.

Among the reviews, Almeida's performance was also highlighted as it moves away from the stereotypical heartthrob by portraying an ambitious and selfish protagonist.
