= El desprecio (2006 TV series) =

- Poster
- Created by: Julio César Mármol
- Written by: Ana Carolina López
- Directed by: Yuri Delgado
- Starring: Flavia Gleske; Ricardo Álamo; Fedra López
- Theme music composer: Rómulo Gallegos
- Opening theme: Demonios by Jeremías
- Ending theme: Demonios by Jeremías
- Country of origin: Venezuela
- Original language: Spanish
- No. of episodes: 121

Production
- Executive producers: José Simón Escalona; Leonor Sardi
- Production location: Caracas
- Cinematography: José Luis Avendaño; Ignacio González
- Editor: Alexis Montero
- Running time: 40 minutes

Original release
- Network: RCTV
- Release: April 26 – November 21, 2006

Related
- Amor a Palos; Te tengo en salsa

El desprecio is a Venezuelan telenovela that was produced by RCTV in 2006. The telenovela is an adaptation of the 1991 telenovela El desprecio written by Julio César Mármol and adapted by Ana Carolina López.

Flavia Gleske and Ricardo Álamo star as the main protagonists with Fedra López as the main antagonist. The telenovela aired on RCTV from April 26, 2006 to November 21, 2006.

== Plot ==
Clara Inés (Flavia Gleske) is a young girl who was raised by nuns in a convent in the countryside. One day, a priest tells her that she is part of the wealthy Santamarina family and decides to go to the capital city Caracas to discover more about her origins. Along the way, she meets Raul Velandró (Ricardo Álamo), a member of the family who discovers that she is part of his family and decides to help her. Clara Inés is not aware of the danger. Her aunt Pastora Lara Portillo (Fedra López) becomes her worst enemy. Twenty years ago, she unsuccessfully orchestrated the death of Clara Inés and now wants to take absolute control of the Santamarina fortune currently held by her husband Israel Huatulco (Eduardo Serrano) for her son Edilio (Nacho Huett).

Clara Inés becomes the target of many attacks, but she gains self-confidence and enacts her revenge.

== Cast ==
- Flavia Gleske as Clara Inés Santamaría
- Ricardo Álamo as Raúl Velandró Lara-Portillo
- Eduardo Serrano as Israel Santamaría
- Fedra López as Pastora Lara-Portillo de Santamaría / Ilis Lara-Portillo
- Nacho Huett as Edilio Velandró Lara-Portillo
- Paula Bevilacqua as Ludmila Álvarez de Velandró
- Deyalit López as Lucely Linares Santamaría
- Zhandra De Abreu as Elisa Salas
- Sandy Olivares as Manuel Jesús Malpica Santamaría
- Andrés Suárez as Gabriel Barón
- Monica Spear as Tamara Campos de Velandró
- Adolfo Cubas as Cirilo Santamaría
- Adita Riera as Octavia Santamaría
- Francis Rueda as Guillermina Albornoz (Sor Juana)
- Beatriz Vasquez as Elisenda Medina
- Leopoldo Regnault as Misael Velandró
- Alejo Felipe as Baudillio Velandró
- Gonzalo Cubero as Ambrocio Cepeda
- Carlos Arreaza as Álvaro Munderey
- Rebeca Alemán as Berenice Santamaría
- Karelys Ollarves as Zaida Castellanos
- Oscar Cabrera as Crisanto "Cris" Maldonado
- Lady Núñez as Violeta Velandró
- Abril Schreiber as Gloriana Campos
- Sthuard Rodríguez as Fabio Linares
- Donny Ochoa as Peretico
- José Ángel Ávila as Giorgio
- Juan Carlos López as Fernando
- Alfonso Medina as Gonzalo
- Cesar Bencid as Colimodio "Pereto" Peralta
- Gabriel Blanco as Gastón Maneiro
- Jesus Cervo as Tirzo
- Antonio Cuevas as Rey Lozada
- Yaneth Flores as Estrella Peralta
- Willian Goite as Padre Atenor Oliviera
- Simón Gómez as Aquiles
- Lolimar Sánchez as Afrodita
- Oswaldo Mago as Humberto Martini
- Norma Matos as Maribel Martini
- Aracelly Prieto as Brigida Albornoz
- José Romero as Gumersindo Vargas
- Freddy Salazar as Padre Potentá
- Priscila Izquierdo as Eva Linares
- Dorinay Castillo as Fátima Linares
