= Trans (1982 film) =

- Directed by: Manuel Herreros de Lemos; Mateo Manaure Arilla
- Release date: 1982
- Running time: 22 minutes
- Country: Venezuela
- Language: Spanish

Trans is a Venezuelan short documentary film released in 1982 and directed by Manuel Herreros de Lemos and Mateo Manaure Arilla. It is one of the first Venezuelan audiovisual productions that, through first-person testimonies of trans women and transvestites, and opinions of representatives of the country's society, presents the reality of trans people in Caracas.

== Plot ==
Trans starts with the presentation of a transvestite named “Venezuela” who performs a lip sync of Irene Cara's song “Fame” in a nightclub in the Sabana Grande district of Caracas. After that, her initial monologue begins with the phrase: "My name is Venezuela. I'm a transvestite. I work here in this nightclub. It's my means, but it's not my goal".

The 22-minute documentary film narrates the lives of different transvestites and trans people in Caracas in the early 1980s. Their testimonies are accompanied with interviews with other personalities, such as Simón Figuera Pérez, commander of the Caracas Metropolitan Police, and Fernando Bianco, director of the Venezuelan Psychiatric Research Center.

The final scene of the documentary consists of a group of transvestites entering the illuminated fountain of Plaza Venezuela while the song “Abusadora” by Billo's Caracas Boys plays in the background.

== Production ==
It was co-produced with the help of the Film Department of the University of the Andes (ULA). It was previewed at the Second National Film Festival held from 30 October to 5 November 1982 in Mérida state, while the official premiere took place at the National Cinematheque of Venezuela, located in the National Library, on 8 June 1983.

By 2016 the short film was in a poor state of preservation, and the copies that were in the film archive of the National Cinematheque had disappeared. After a crowdfunding campaign and the efforts of Venezuelans Ignacio Ruan and Pablo Capurro of the El Astillero bookstore, the Institute for Studies on Latin American Art (ISLAA) acquired 75 photographs and a copy of the film, which was restored and exhibited in February 2023 in Madrid for the inauguration of the Archivo Arkhé headquarters.

== See also ==
- Venezuelan LGBTQ cinema
