= Yul Bürkle =

Venezuelan actor and model

- Born: Yul Hansel Bürkle Solorzano; September 30, 1974 (age 51); Maracay, Aragua, Venezuela
- Occupations: Actor, model
- Years active: 1995–present
- Spouse: Scarlet Ortiz

Yul Hansel Bürkle Solorzano (born September 30, 1974) is a Venezuelan actor and model of German ancestry.

== Personal life ==
He is engaged to actress Scarlet Ortiz, a fellow Venezuelan actress whom he met on the set of the RCTV telenovela Mis 3 hermanas. On March 9, 2010, Yul became a father to a baby girl named Bárbara Briana, after Scarlet gave birth at Mount Sinai Hospital in Miami. Her godparents are actress Gaby Espino and soap opera writer Alberto Gomez.

== Filmography ==
Television
Year	Title	Role	Notes
1996	La llaman Mariamor	Willy	
1997	Destino de mujer	Arnaldo	
1999	Luisa Fernanda	Gustavo Cazán	
2000	Mis 3 hermanas	Anibal Solis Quintero	
2001	Secreto de amor	Braulio Viloria	
2003	La mujer de Lorenzo	Alex	
2004	Inocente de ti	Douglas	
2005	El amor no tiene precio	Mariano Lujàn	
2007	Acorralada	Andrés Dávila	
2007	Aunque mal paguen	Thomas	
2009	Alma indomable	Fernando Ríos	
2010	Salvador de mujeres	Manuel	
2010	Alguien te mira	Mauricio Ostos	
2011-2012	Natalia del Mar	Father Baltazar	59 episodes
2013	Los secretos de Lucía	Pablo Zuleta	
2013	De todas maneras Rosa	Carlos Miguel Arevalo	"Un lamentable accidente marcó la vida de Rosa María Bermúdez" (Episode 1)
2014	Escándalos: Todo es real excepto sus nombres		
2015	Tomame o déjame	Leonardo	Filming
2016	Silvana sin lana	Esteban "Steve"	
2017	Vikki RPM	Graco Rivera	
2023	Amores que engañan	Roberto	
2025	Sin Frenos	Julio Cesar	Main Cast
