= La loba herida =

1992 Venezuelan telenovela

- Genre: Telenovela; Romance; Drama
- Created by: Manuel Rico Muñoz; José Simón Escalona
- Written by: José Simón Escalona; Jhonny Gavloski; Xiomara Moreno; María Helena Portas
- Directed by: Tito Rojas
- Starring: Mariela Alcala; Carlos Montilla; Astrid Carolina Herrera; Julie Restifo
- Opening theme: "Loba Herida" performed by Carlos Montilla
- Original language: Spanish
- No. of episodes: 203

Production
- Executive producer: Juan Pablo Zamora
- Production location: Venezuela
- Camera setup: Multi-camera
- Production company: Marte TV

Original release
- Network: Venevisión
- Release: 1992 – 1992

Related
- Contra viento y marea (2005)

La loba herida (The Wounded She-Wolf) is a Venezuelan telenovela shown in 1992, starring with Mariela Alcala, Carlos Montilla, and Astrid Carolina Herrera. This telenovela contains 214 episodes. Nicandro Díaz produced its remake, known as Contra Viento y Marea for Televisa in 2005.

== Synopsis ==
Rosana Soler is a young Spanish girl who is sent to Venezuela to live with her Aunt Celeste and Uncle Elias when she is orphaned. After a rape attempt by her uncle, Rosana runs away from home and meets Eva Rudel, a cruel woman who runs a whorehouse. Thanks to Celeste, Rosana becomes a ward of Eva, whose husband has a bastard son, Alvaro, that he wants to legitimize and bring to Caracas. Armando doesn't know that his son had been a bullfighter who was killed in the ring, so when he shows up in Spain to collect his son, Alvaro's sister Isabel dresses up as a boy and greets her new dad. Isabel's goal, however, is to wreak vengeance on Eva, who was responsible for landing her mother in jail. Rosana accompanies Armando to Spain and on the plane bumps into Makuto, who has just been released from prison where he was incarcerated for a crime he didn't commit. They fall in love.

== Cast ==
- Mariela Alcala as Rosana Soler
- Carlos Montilla as Macuto
- Jorge Aravena as Cabrerita
- Astrid Carolina Herrera as Isabel/Alvaro/Lucero
- Julie Restifo as Eva Rudell
- Elba Escobar as La Franca
- Luis Fernández as Daniel
- Javier Vidal as Martin Guzman
- Astrid Gruber as Ambar Castillo
- Ines María Calero as Muñeca
- Alberto Sunshine as Gustavo
- Gladys Caceres as Erika
- Betty Ruth as Doña Rocio
- Martin Lantigua as Armando Castillo
- Alma Inglann as Carmela
- Olimpia Maldonado as Julieta
- Juan C. Gardie as Antonio
- Yajaira Paredes as Gloria
- Carolina Groppuso as Grilla
- Alexander Montilla as Guillermo
- Johnny Nessy as Saúl
- Gabriela Spanic
- Jose Antonio Carbonell
