= Yo, indocumentada =

2011 Venezuelan film

- Film poster
- Directed by: Andrea Baranenko
- Written by: Andrea Baranenko; Alejandro Normand
- Starring: Tamara Adrián; Desirée; Victoria
- Cinematography: Glendys Ariza; Michell Rivas
- Music by: Andrés Level
- Production companies: Bajo la Manga Laboratorio Audiovisual; Cinequipos; Trampolín Espacio Documental
- Release date: 2013
- Running time: 61 minutes
- Country: Venezuela
- Language: Spanish

Yo, indocumentada (lit. 'I, undocumented') is a 2013 Venezuelan documentary film directed by Andrea Baranenko. The film is about three Venezuelan transgender women and their efforts to be legally recognized in the country, including being able to change their legal name.

== Plot ==
The film focuses in three Venezuelan transgender women: Tamara Adrián (a lawyer), Desiree (a hairdresser) and Victoria (an art student) and chronicles their efforts to be legally recognized in the country, including being able to change their legal name, through a series of legal actions, as well as demand their right to an identity, in a society where machismo and transphobia are still rooted. Tamara, one of the protagonists, is a law professor at the Andrés Bello Catholic University who despite her countless academic recognitions and honors in Venezuela and in France she has not been able to win her legal battle. The documentary also depicts the social and legal exclusion that the LGBT community in Venezuela faces.

== Reception ==
The film represented Venezuela and was part of the 2013 official selection of the United Nations Association Film Festival (UNAFF).

== See also ==
- Venezuelan LGBT+ cinema
