= Calle luna, Calle sol =

Television series

- Genre: Telenovela
- Created by: Manuel Muñoz Rico
- Developed by: José Vicente Quintana
- Written by: Karín Valecillos; Zaret Romero; Carmen García Vilar; Giuliana Rodríguez; Gloria Soares; José Vicente Quintana
- Directed by: Otto Rodríguez; Tony Rodríguez
- Starring: Mónica Spear; Manuel Sosa; Chantal Baudaux; Amanda Gutiérrez; Nacho Huett
- Opening theme: "Calle luna, Calle sol" performed by Víctor Muñoz
- Country of origin: Venezuela
- Original language: Spanish
- No. of episodes: 130

Production
- Executive producer: Carmen Cecilia Urbaneja
- Producer: José Gerardo Guillén
- Production locations: Caracas, Venezuela
- Editor: Alexis Montero
- Camera setup: Multi-camera
- Production company: RCTV

Original release
- Network: RCTV Internacional
- Release: Invalid date range

Related
- Nadie me dirá como quererte; Libres como el viento; Marielena (1980)

Calle Luna, Calle Sol (English title: World's Apart) is a Venezuelan telenovela developed by José Vicente Quintana and produced by RCTV in 2007 as a free adaptation of the telenovela Marielena that was produced by the same channel in 1979.

Monica Spear and Manuel Sosa star as the main protagonists with Amanda Gutiérrez and Nacho Huett as antagonists, accompanied by the stellar performances of Chantal Baudaux, Daniel Alvarado and Nacarid Escalona.

RCTV began transmitting Calle Luna, Calle Sol from March 18, 2009 at 9 pm replacing Nadie me dirá como quererte. The last episode was broadcast on September 14, 2009.

== Plot ==
Calle Luna, Calle Sol is a telenovela contrasting folk and urban culture. It shows two completely different realities: that of the rich and the poor, and what differentiates the two groups. In both neighborhoods, major developments speak for themselves and their realities are moved each of the characters. In the story, Maria Esperanza is a young, humble, studious, and hardworking young woman who has suffered from poverty due to the irresponsibility of her father, who comes and goes from her house. Even in the midst of these circumstances, she grew up with strong values, dedicated to making something of herself. However, her plans could be disrupted by her emotional struggles. Despite this turmoil, Maria Esperanza will fight to keep the love of his family and overcome her emotional trials and tribulations.

The story began four years after the embarrassing incident that happened to Maria Esperanza, after which Manuel returned to England to study administration. Manuel then comes back in order to take over the family business, Furniture Mastronardi, while building a relationship with Gabriela, who would be his lifelong girlfriend. The tragic past of Maria Esperanza knows when to remove Manuel Augusto, who represents the renewal of their broken dreams, because they arise from a sincere love, full of hopes.

== Cast ==
=== Starring ===
- Monica Spear as María Esperanza Rodríguez
- Manuel Sosa as Manuel Augusto Mastronardi García
- Chantal Baudaux as Gabriela "Gaby" Bustamante

=== Also starring ===
- Amanda Gutiérrez as Cecilia García Vda. de Mastronardi
- Nacarid Escalona as Isabel "Chabela" Rodríguez
- Daniel Alvarado as Juan José Pérez "Juancho"
- Estefanía López as Yamileth Melody Rodríguez
- Nacho Huett as Rafael Eduardo Mastronardi García "Rafa"
- José Ramón Barreto as José Francisco Rodríguez Rodríguez "Cheo"
- Vicente Tepedino as Rómulo Hidalgo
- María Cristina Lozada as Ángela Rossi Vda. de Mastronardi
- Crisbel Henríquez as Bélgica Margarita Pacheco
- Erick Ronsó as Alfredo Pineda
- Sandy Olivares as César Ayala Infante
- Andreína Caro as Alexandra Valecillos
- Absalón de los Ríos as Aldo Luján "El Jefe"
- Relú Cardozo as Lourdes de Pineda
- Vito Lonardo as Mario de Jesús Pineda
- Mauricio Gómez as Johanson Iriarte "Chupeta"
- José Roberto Díaz as Custodio Chacón
- Elvis Chaveinte as Ricardo Sánchez "El Mexicano"
- Jean Carlos Rodríguez as Enrique Vallejo "Kike"
- Vanessa Pallás as Yoconda Mastronardi García "Monalisa"
- Gabriel Mantilla as Carlos Rodríguez Rodríguez "Carlitos"
- Lili-Anahys Taravella as Camila Díaz
- Cristal Avilera as Valentina Díaz
- Andreína Chataing as Elvira Lugo
- Sandra Díaz as Valerie Hidalgo Arriaga
- Antonio Cuevas as Giuseppe Mastronardi
- Leonardo Marrero as Ignacio Centeno
- Krisbell Jackson as La Condolesa
