= Volver a vivir (TV series) =

- Genre: Telenovela; Romance; Drama
- Created by: Fausto Verdial
- Written by: Fausto Verdial; Cristina Policastro; Armando Coll; Enrique Lárez Monserratte
- Directed by: Luis Manzo
- Starring: Gledys Ibarra; Carlos Cámara Jr. Mariano Alvarez; Carlota Sosa
- Opening theme: "La Distancia y Tu" by Luis Silva
- Country of origin: Venezuela
- Original language: Spanish
- No. of episodes: 127

Production
- Executive producer: Carmen Cecilia Urbaneja
- Producer: Hernando Faría
- Production location: Caracas
- Production company: RCTV

Original release
- Network: RCTV
- Release: September 22, 1996 – March 31, 1997

Related
- Ilusiones; La Inolvidable

Volver a vivir is a Venezuelan telenovela written by Fausto Verdial and produced by Radio Caracas Televisión in 1996. This telenovela lasted 127 episodes and was distributed internationally by RCTV International.

Gledys Ibarra and Carlos Cámara Jr. starred as the main protagonists with Bettina Grand, Eduardo Gadea Pérez and Mariam Valero and accompanied by Carolina Tejera, Carlota Sosa, Beatriz Valdés and Mariano Álvarez.

== Synopsis ==
Carmen Teresa, the main character, is on the verge of ending her marriage when she discovers that her husband, Miguel Angel, is having an affair with his co-worker, Lili. For nine years, Carmen Teresa has been a devoted housewife whose main concern in life was to take care of her house, her husband and her only daughter. As a result, she has never pursued a professional career of any type. Miguel Angel is a typical womanizer who doesn't consider his behavior inappropriate since he provides for his family, fulfilling his marital responsibilities.

Her husband's betrayal forces Carmen Teresa to find a new direction in life, giving her reason to question her reality, her relationship and the emptiness of her existence. Carmen Teresa's parents, specially her mother, live in the past. Their two older daughters are married, and they expect their youngest daughter to marry as well, but she has other plans. They also have a son, Alvaro, married with two children, who is as conservative as his parents. Much to his dissatisfaction, his wife does not share his ideals and eventually leaves him for another man.

Musiú, Carmen Teresa's father, was born in Spain where he was intimately involved in social and political lost causes. Libertad is Carmen Teresa's sister who is married to Abelardo Fonseca. Libertad and Abelardo are wealthy, but terribly unhappy. He is the owner of an architectural company where Miguel Angel is employed. To make matters worse, Abelardo also has his eyes set on Lili. This complicates the situation even more because it eventually involves the whole family. Abelardo is the opposite of Miguel Angel. One is a modern-day executive, but bitter and arrogant, the other one is charming and maintains a nonchalant attitude on life. Lili, the woman Miguel Angel falls in lust with, is not a villain, rather a victim who has fallen in love with the wrong man.

Sara, a close friend of the family, who Carmen Teresa's parents took in to their home as a baby, is a sincere loving woman. Carmen Teresa's best friend, Miranda Kowalsky, is an outgoing, independent woman who owns a real estate company, and she has lived a love story similar to that of Carmen Teresa's.

The struggle of a man and a woman with their individual feelings is a never ending plight. The character's feelings, in most cases, go from a simple lie to the heartless truth whenever someone tries to take away their love, their power and their belongings. The women in this story overcome their tragedies and change their destiny, and those who don't at least have the option of doing so.

== Cast ==
- Gledys Ibarra as Carmen Teresa Rodríguez de Bernal
- Carlos Cámara Jr. as Miguel Ángel Bernal
- Mariano Álvarez as Abelardo Fonseca
- Carlota Sosa as Miranda Kowalski
- Alberto Alifa as Doctor Vicente Reyes Mora
- Carolina Tejera as Ángela Rodríguez
- Beatriz Valdez as Libertad Rodríguez de Fonseca
- Bettina Grand as Lily Garzón
- Eduardo Gadea Pérez as Gonzalo Suñer
- Gisvel Ascanio as Margarita Suñer
- Dora Mazzone as Mónica Guffanti
- Ricardo Bianchi as Marcelo
- Iván Tamayo as Jorge Luis Amaro
- Dilia Waikarán as María de Lourdes de Rodríguez "Lulú"
- Francis Romero as Oriana
- Virginia Urdaneta as Augusta Suñer
- Margarita Hernández as Abogada Cecilia Suvillaga
- Eduardo Serrano as Bruno Santander
- Reinaldo José Pérez as Comisario Rosales
- Martha Pabón as Grace Kellis Chacón
- Frank Maneiro as Rengifo
- Rolando Padilla as Néstor Socorro
- Martha Estrada as Yamilet
- Héctor Moreno as Lucas Guffanti
