= Julie Restifo =

American and Venezuelan actress (born 1958)

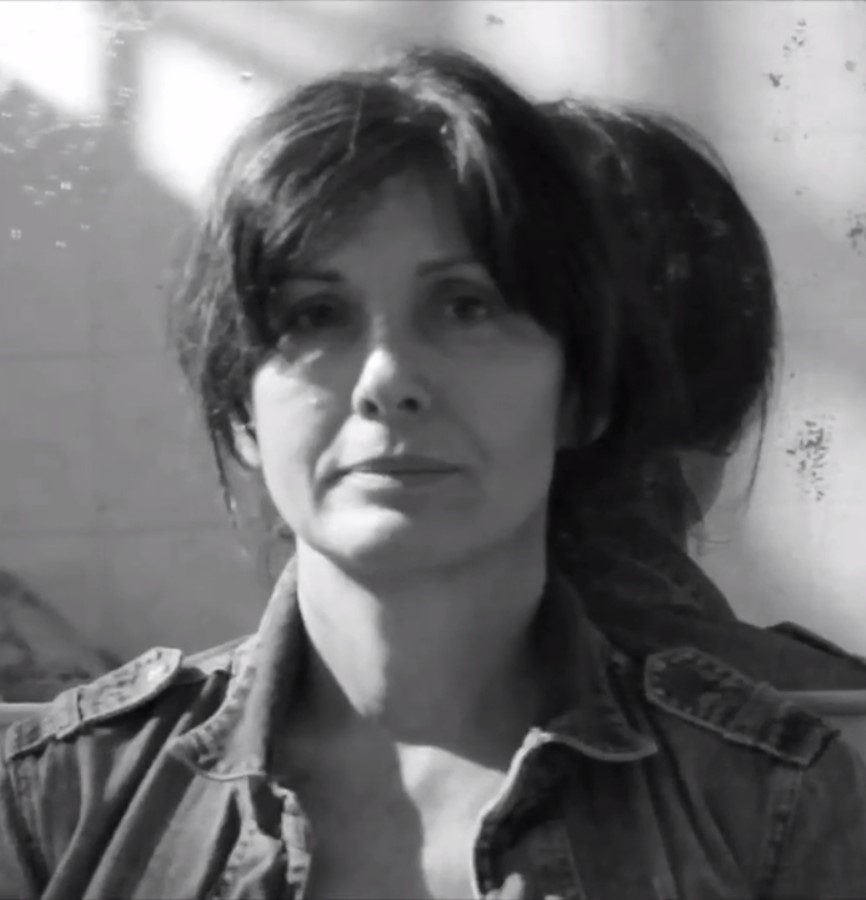
- Restifo in 2014
- Born: Julie Marie Restifo; July 31, 1958 (age 67); Long Island, New York, U.S.
- Citizenship: United States; Venezuela
- Education: Universidad Católica Andrés Bello
- Occupation: Actress
- Years active: 1981–present
- Spouse: Javier Vidal
- Children: Jan; Josette Vidal

Julie Marie Restifo (born July 31, 1958) is an American and Venezuelan actress. She is best known for his characters in the telenovelas La loba herida, La llaman Mariamor, Hay amores que matan, Viva la Pepa, and La mujer de Judas.

== Biography ==
Restifo was born in Long Island, United States on 31 July 1958. She studied social communication at Universidad Católica Andrés Bello. She is married to actor Javier Vidal, with whom she has two children, Jan and Josette Vidal.

== Filmography ==
=== Films ===
Year	Title	Role	Notes
1983	Homicidio culposo	Alicia's friend	Film debut
1985	Más allá del silencio		
1986	La otra ilusión		
1986	De cómo Anita Camacho quiso levantarse a Marino Méndez		
1990	Río Negro		
1995	Rosa de Francia		
2000	La mágica aventura de Óscar		
2002	Rosa, un delirio		Short film
2009	Son de la Calle	Cristina	
2014	La roca	Mother	Short film
2016	Tamara	Isbelia	
2018	The Vampire of Lake		

=== Television ===
Year	Title	Role	Notes
1984	Azucena	Brenda Mirabal	Television debut
1989	Coplan	Chef des services secrets anglais	"Vengeance à Caracas" (Season 1, Episode 4)
1990	Emperatriz		
1990	María María	Regina	
1992	La loba herida	Eva Rudel de Castillo	
1993	Pedacito de cielo		
1995	Entrega total		
1996	La llaman Mariamor	Mara	
1998	Aunque me cueste la vida	Bélgica Michelena	
1999	Carita pintada	Conchetta de Rossi	
2000	Hay amores que matan	Emma de Castro-León	
2001	Viva la Pepa	Josefa Lunar / Pepa	
2003	La mujer de Judas	Joaquina Leal "La Juaca" / Juaca Leal	
2003	La cuaima	Arminda Rovaina de Cáceres	
2005	Mujer con pantalones	Cristina Galué de Torrealba	
2006	Y los declaro marido y mujer	Lucía Mujica de Spert	
2010	La mujer perfecta	Antonella Montiel	
2012	Mi ex me tiene ganas	Clara Sotillo	
2014	La virgen de la calle	Ana Lucía Molina de Rivas	
2015	Piel salvaje	Marcelina Esquivel	
