= United Nations Association Film Festival =

International documentary film festival

- Location: Palo Alto, East Palo Alto, Stanford University and San Francisco, USA
- Founded: Founded in 1998 by Jasmina Bojic
- Language: English
- Website: www.unaff.org

The United Nations Association Film Festival (UNAFF) is an international documentary film festival. It was founded by Jasmina Bojic, a Stanford educator and film critic, in 1998 to honor the 50th anniversary of the Universal Declaration of Human Rights. The festival showcases documentaries related to human rights and social issues/solutions and holds discussion forums with experts on the topics.

The festival takes place annually in October in Palo Alto, East Palo Alto, San Francisco, and at Stanford University, spanning about 11 days.

== History ==
UNAFF was founded in 1998 by Jasmina Bojic, a lecturer at Stanford University in International Relations and winner of the UNESCO Fellini Medal in 2014 for her contribution in promotion of Universal Declaration of Human Rights through documentary films.

While the festival supports the goals of the United Nations, it is an independent entity both financially and in governance.

The festival has continuously been taking place since 1998 and has become one of the oldest solely documentary film festivals in the United States.

In 2020, the festival took place online for the first time due to COVID-19 circumstances.

The theme of the 2026 UNAFF is "Passion for Change," and its dates are October 15–25, 2026.

== Festival and selection ==
Every year, the festival has a theme which emphasizes a particular topic. These have included Education, Globalization, Health, Environment, Sustainability, Refugees, War, and Peace. The film submission process begins in January, and the selection process takes place during June each year. The selection process is quite competitive (for the year 2025, there were only 60 films selected out of the 600 submitted and reviewed by the jury). UNAFF has screened films which later won major awards (8 Academy Award winners and 39 Academy Award-nominated documentaries). There are round panel discussions with prominent experts, filmmakers, and community members to discuss challenging issues and solutions.

== Awards ==
UNAFF is a juried film festival whose entries are viewed and selected by a dedicated group of jurors coming from various walks of life, age groups, and backgrounds – from film experts and academics to community members, students, and interested professionals – who review and discuss the submitted films and decide which ones will be screened in October.

There are 6 primary awards:

- UNAFF Grand Jury Award for Best Documentary
- UNAFF Grand Jury Award for Best Short Documentary
- UNAFF Youth Vision Award
- UNAFF Award for Cinematography
- UNAFF Award for Editing
- UNAFF Visionary Award

== Year-round programs ==
There are multiple year-round programs organized to extend the impact of the festival's selected films.

=== UNAFF Traveling Film Festival ===
Since 2000, the traveling festival takes place year-round in collaboration with UNA-USA chapters, universities, other film festivals, and community organizations across the US and abroad. The films are chosen from the films screened in the annual festival. So far it has taken place in Bellevue, Berkeley, Boston, Burlington, Cambridge, Chapel Hill, Chicago, Davis, Denver, Durham, Fryeburg, Honolulu, Houston, La Crosse, Las Vegas, Los Angeles, Miami, Monterey, New Haven, New York, Philadelphia, Salt Lake City, San Diego, Santa Cruz, Saratoga, Sebastopol, Sonoma, Washington D.C., Waukesha, and internationally in Abu Dhabi, Belgrade, Kranjska Gora, Paris, Phnom Penh, and Venice.

=== UNAFF in Schools ===
This series showcases documentary films related to teens (targeted to middle/high school students), followed by open discussion with film makers. It started in 2005.

=== UNAFF for Seniors ===
This series shows documentary films relevant to seniors members of the society. It started in 2007.

=== UNAFF and Kids ===
This series' age-appropriate documentary films (targeted for age 7–12) teach children through hands-on activity about the world around them.

=== UNAFF Café ===
This series documentary films and conducts discussion at various venues/occasion in the community. It started in 2010

=== UNAFF with Veterans ===
This series brings documentary films to veterans and their families. It started in 2014.

=== UNAFF Women's Salon ===
This series started in 2015 to Encourage Women for active discussion in a supportive environment

=== UNAFF in Libraries ===
This program brings together documentary films and the love of literature

=== UNAFF Archive ===
This program offers research material for students of film, politics and international relations

=== Camera as Witness ===
A collaboration of UNAFF and Stanford Arts, this series is conducted at Stanford University, where documentaries are presented to students/community members throughout the year.

== Associations ==
The Honorary Committee members include businessman Ted Turner and William Henry Draper III, Hollywood producer Gale Anne Hurd, Academy Award winner Barbara Trent, Academy Award Nominee Erika Szanto, and various film and music stars known for involvement in human rights. These include Alec Baldwin, Peter Coyote, Lolita Davidovich, Danny Glover, Daryl Hannah, Matthew Modine, Walter Murch, Susan Sarandon, John Savage, and Zucchero.
