= Alejandro Delgado =

Venezuelan actor and producer

Alejandro Delgado is a Venezuelan actor and producer. Delgado was born in Caracas, the capital of Venezuela. Soon after graduating from high school, he received a scholarship to the National Academy of Arts and Sciences for TV and Film, under the tutelage of Amalia Perez Diaz. After several years of work in the Venezuelan and Peruvian film industries, he moved to the United States. There, he met with two agents from the top talent agencies in Los Angeles, where he received supportive and positive responses. He signed with the Henderson Hogan Talent Agency, and shortly thereafter, landed the role of "Harold Marresh" in Return to Babylon, a black and white comedy feature film directed by Alex Canawati. The film also starred María Conchita Alonso. Meetings with top casting directors Marnie Saitta from CBS's The Young and the Restless and Christy Dooley from CBS's The Bold and the Beautiful, he was cast in The Bold and the Beautiful, playing the character of Martin Escobosa.

== Filmography ==
- Return to Babylon (2008) as Harold Marresh
- The Night Stalker (2002) (TV) as Detective Garcia
- The Bold and the Beautiful (1987) TV series as Martin Escobosa (unknown episodes, 2000–2001)

Belleza y poder (USA: Spanish title)

- Old Friends (2000) (credited as Alex Delgado) as Pierre Duvan
- Torbellino (1997) TV series as Leonardo Moreno (1997)
- Sirena (1993) TV series as Juan Hundre
- Maribel (1989) TV series as Oswaldo Zapata
- Rubí rebelde (1989) TV series as Reynaldo Itturralde
- Abigail (1988) TV series as Freddy Avellaneda (unknown episodes)
- Alma mía (1988) TV series as Manuel
- Old Friends (2000) (producer)
