= Tamara Adrián =

Venezuelan politician (born 1954)

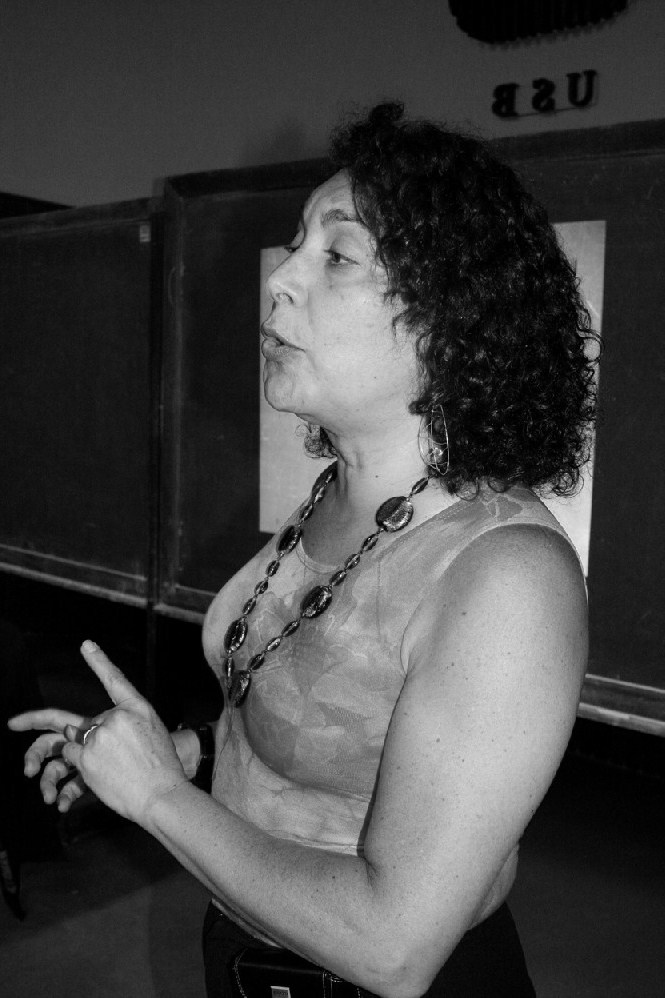
- Adrián in 2008

Deputy of the National Assembly of Venezuela
- Incumbent
- Assumed office 5 January 2016
- Constituency: Capital District

Personal details
- Born: 20 February 1954 (age 72) Caracas, Venezuela
- Party: Popular Will
- Education: Andrés Bello Catholic University
- Profession: Lawyer

Tamara Adrián (born 20 February 1954 in Caracas) is a Venezuelan politician, who was elected to the National Assembly of Venezuela in the 2015 Venezuelan parliamentary election. She is noted as the first openly transgender person elected to office in Venezuela, and only the second openly transgender member of a national legislature in the Western Hemisphere. Some early media coverage credited her as the first openly transgender member of a legislature in the Americas, but this was later corrected due to the election of Michelle Suárez Bértora to the Senate of Uruguay in 2014. In 2023 Tamara became the first openly transgender candidate in a presidential election.

She is a member of the Popular Will party, one of the forces in opposition to the PSUV-led government of Nicolás Maduro. Within this party, she organized a social movement called Pro-Inclusion, aiming at promoting equal rights. She took her oath of office at the National Assembly of Venezuela on January 14, 2015. During her term in office, Adrián intends to promote proper access to public records on identity, same-sex marriage and human rights.

== Biography ==
Tamara graduated from Andrés Bello Catholic University in 1976. She then went on to obtain her doctorate in law with high honors from University of Paris II Panthéon-Assas in 1982. She also earned a diploma in comparative law from the Paris Institute of Comparative Law in 1982. In 2016, Adrián completed Harvard University's John F. Kennedy School of Government program for Senior Executives in State and Local Government as a David Bohnett LGBTQ Victory Institute Leadership Fellow.

Prior to her election to the Venezuelan legislature, Adrián worked as a lawyer and LGBT activist, including serving on the board of the International Lesbian, Gay, Bisexual, Trans and Intersex Association and the organizing committee of the International Day Against Homophobia, Transphobia and Biphobia. She was forced to register her candidacy under her deadname, as Venezuelan law does not currently permit a person that was assigned male at birth to legally change their name to a female name. In 2002, she underwent gender reassignment surgery in Thailand. In 2004, she submitted an appeal to the Supreme Court of Justice to have her identity legally recognized; as of 2016, it still had not been granted.

Tamara Adrián believes that the stigma and discrimination surrounding the transgender community stimulates poverty, marginalization, and violence against them. To her, these problems are unacceptable under international laws of human rights. She was motivated to take a role in her government in response to political activists being arrested in Venezuela. In 2014, there were nationwide protests regarding the democratic and economic conditions of the time. In response to these protests, President Nicolás Maduro ordered for the arrest of political protesters. According to Foro Penal, over 13,000 people have been arrested since 2014 because of protests relating to the Venezuelan government.

== In popular culture ==
Before being elected as National Assembly deputy, Tamara was featured in the 2011 documentary film Yo, indocumentada along with two other Venezuelan transgender women that strive to change their legal name in the country.

The 2016 film Tamara was partly inspired in her life. Tamara made a cameo in the film with the role of a university rector.

== See also ==
- LGBT rights in Venezuela
- List of the first LGBT holders of political offices
