= Carolina Tejera =

Venezuelan actress (born 1975)

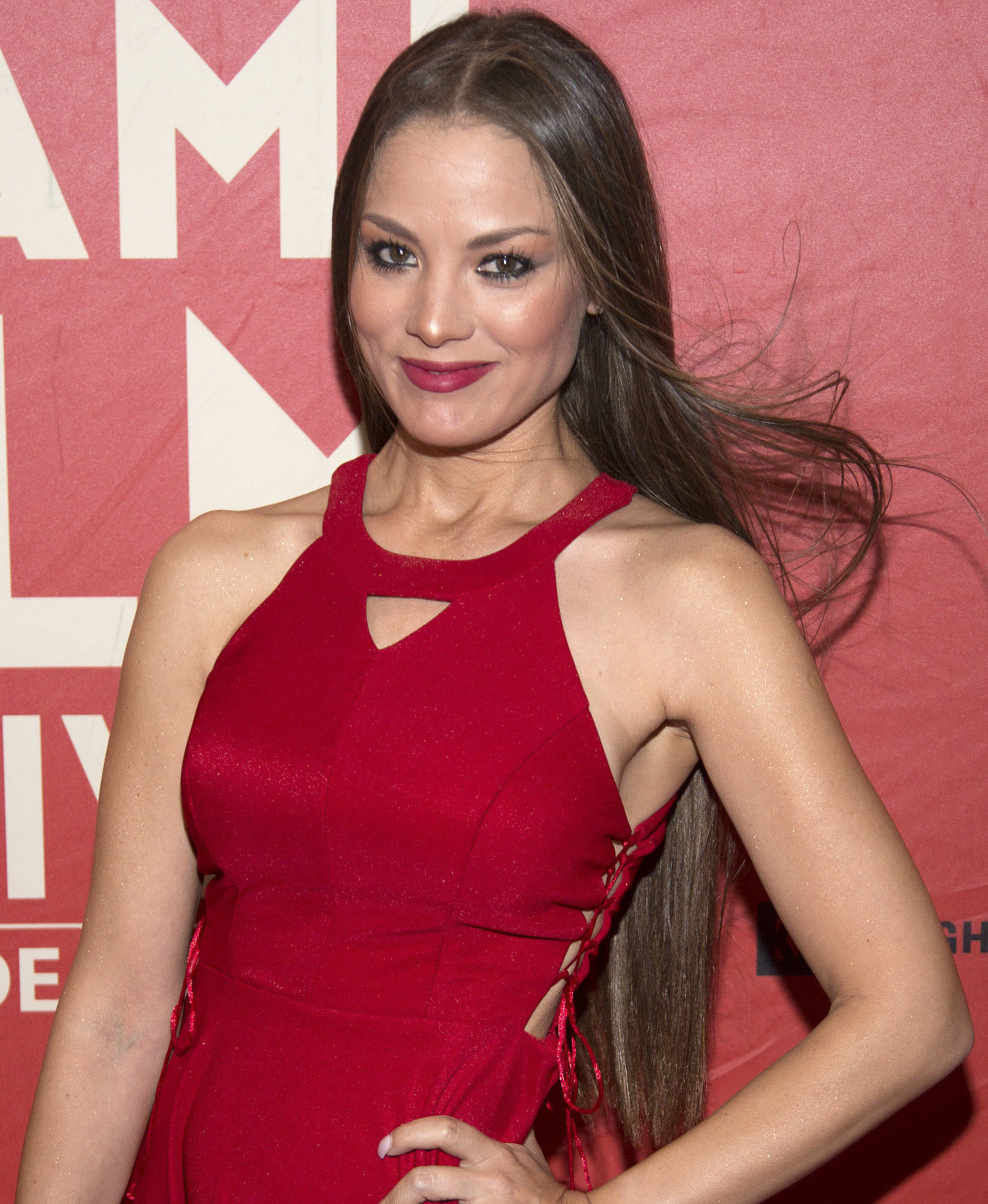
- Tejera at the 2017 Miami International Film Festival
- Born: Nelly Carolina Tejera; 14 October 1975 (age 51); Caracas, Venezuela
- Occupation: Actress
- Spouse: Don Stockwell (2006-2011)
- Children: 1

Nelly Carolina Tejera (born 14 October 1976) is a Venezuelan actress best known for her role as Eva Granados in Venevision's telenovela Gata Salvaje. Her mother is Elizabeth Guyana and her father is Fransiz Tejera. She has one sister, Lisa Tejera.

== Personal life ==
On 4 March 2006, Tejera married Costa Rican businessman Don Stockwell. On 2 August 2006, she gave birth to her first child, a boy. The couple divorced in 2011.

== Filmography ==
Year	Title	Role	Notes
2024	Los 50	Herself	Contestant (season 2)
2024	Top Chef VIP	Herself	Contestant (season 3)
2014	Cosita Linda	Tiffany	Antagonist
2012	Corazón Valiente	Lorena	Co-protagonist
2011	Mi Corazón Insiste… en Lola Volcán	Diana	Antagonist
2010-2011	Aurora	Clara	Co-protagonist
2010	Alguien Te Mira	Valeria	Co-protagonist
2008	Valeria	Miroslava	Antagonist
2007	Lola...Érase una vez	Samara	Antagonist
2004	Inocente de ti	Nuria	Antagonist
2003	La mujer de Lorenzo	Laura	Antagonist
2002	Gata Salvaje	Eva	Antagonist
2001	Carissima	Maribella	Antagonist
2000	Hay Amores Que Matan	Amanda	Protagonist
1999	Mujer Secreta	Eugenia	Protagonist
1998	Reina de Corazones	Mesalina	Antagonist
1996	Volver a vivir	Angela	Co-protagonist
