= María Domínguez =

María Domínguez may refer to:

- María Domínguez Castellano (born 1965), Spanish neuroscientist
- María Domínguez Remón (1882–1936), Spanish journalist, poet, republican socialist politician
- María Hilaria Domínguez (born 1953), Mexican politician
- María Magdalena Domínguez (1922–2021), Spanish poet
- María Gloria Domínguez-Bello (born 1959), Venezuelan-American microbial ecologist
