= Martin J. Blaser =

American academic

- Blaser in his lab with Xuesong Zhang, Ph.D.
- Born: December 18, 1948 (age 77)
- Education: University of Pennsylvania (BA); New York University (MD)
- Spouses: Susan J. Walp; Ronna Wineberg; Maria Gloria Dominguez-Bello
- Scientific career
- Workplaces: Robert Wood Johnson Medical School

Martin J. Blaser (born 1948) is an American physician who is the director of the Center for Advanced Biotechnology and Medicine at Rutgers (NJ) Biomedical and Health Sciences and the Henry Rutgers Chair of the Human Microbiome and Professor of Medicine and Pathology and Laboratory Medicine at the Rutgers Robert Wood Johnson Medical School in New Jersey.

In 2013, Blaser was elected to the American Academy of Arts and Sciences. He is a researcher in microbiology and infectious diseases. Blaser's work has focused on Helicobacter pylori, Campylobacter species, Salmonella, Bacillus anthracis, and on the human microbiome.

== Biography ==
Blaser obtained his undergraduate education (Bachelor's of Arts degree in economics) from the University of Pennsylvania in 1969, graduated with an M.D. degree from the New York University School of Medicine in 1973, and did his post-graduate residency and fellowship at the University of Colorado School of Medicine from 1973 to 1979 in Internal Medicine and Infectious Diseases.

Since 2013, Blaser has been married to fellow microbiome researcher and colleague Maria Gloria Dominguez-Bello. Two prior marriages, first to the artist Susan J. Walp and later to the writer and editor Ronna Wineberg ended in divorce.

Blaser served in the US Public Health Service as an Epidemic Intelligence Service Officer at the Centers for Disease Control and Prevention from 1979 to 1981.

In 1998, Blaser established the Foundation for Bacteria, which started the Virtual Museum of Bacteria.

Blaser was elected as an officer of the Infectious Diseases Society of America, serving from 2004-2008, including a one-year term as president in 2006-2007. He has served the National Institutes of Health (NIH) on the Board of Scientific Counselors of the National Cancer Institute (2005–2010; Chair 2009–2010), and on the Advisory Board for Clinical Research (2009–2013; Chair 2012-2013). In 2011, he was elected into the National Academy of Medicine (formerly Institute of Medicine), in recognition of professional achievement and commitment to service in medicine and health. In 2013, he was elected to the American Academy of Arts and Sciences.

In 2014, he was the Kinyoun Lecturer at the National Institute for Allergy and Infectious Diseases (NIAID) at NIH, and received the Alexander Fleming Award for lifetime achievement from the Infectious Diseases Society of America, and gave "The Anatomy Lesson" at the Concertgebouw in Amsterdam. He received the Cura Personalis award from Georgetown University in 2015. His scientific papers have been cited more than 185,000 times (H-index 193) (Google Scholar). He is the lead editor of Principles and Practice of Infectious Diseases (also known as Mandell), the 'bible' of textbooks in the field of Infectious Diseases, with >300 chapters; the 10th edition was recently published.

In 2015, he was selected to be on the list of the TIME 100 Most Influential People in the world, He served on the Advisory Council of the National Center for Complementary and Integrative Health (NCCIH) of the National Institutes of Health from 2015-2019. He was appointed by President Obama as the founding Chair of the President's Advisory Council on Combating Antibiotic-Resistant Bacteria (PACCARB), and served two terms from 2015–2023, serving in the Obama, Trump, and Biden administrations. In 2019, he founded the Rutgers University Microbiome Program (RUMP), which is a university-wide project to develop microbiome science, and examine its impact on health, agriculture, the environment, and human culture. He now co-leads RUMP with Rutgers professors Maria Gloria Dominguez Bello and Liping Zhao.

Blaser sits on scientific advisory boards for Elysium Health, Procter & Gamble, and several biotechnology start-up companies. He serves as a Scientific Advisor to the Food Allergy Fund, Food Allergy Research & Education (FARE), and the Seerave Foundation. He has served on the Advisory Board of the Humans and Microbiome Program (HMP) of the Canadian Institute for Advanced Research (CIFAR) since 2015 (Co-Chair since 2022). In 2019 he received the Robert-Koch-Medal in Gold, and the Karl August Mobius Fellowship from Kiel Life Sciences. In 2021, he received the Prize Medal from the Microbiology Society (UK), for his studies of the human microbiome including Helicobacter pylori as an agent of disease in humans. In 2022, he received an honorary doctoral degree from the University of Bordeaux (Docteur honoris causa)

== Research ==
Blaser is best known for his studies of Helicobacter pylori and its relationship with human diseases. Initially skeptical of Nobel laureate Barry Marshall's findings of H. pylori's relationship to gastric and peptic ulcers, which Blaser described as "the most preposterous thing I'd ever heard; I thought, this guy is a madman," Blaser's work nonetheless later helped establish the role of H. pylori in the causation of gastric cancer, the second leading cause of cancer death in the world. Studies of the diversity of H. pylori lead him to identify the CagA protein and its gene in 1989, which broadened understanding of H. pylori interactions with humans. His team found that cagA+ strains induced enhanced host responses, development of atrophic gastritis, gastric cancer, and peptic ulcer disease, compared to cagA− strains, and that cagA+ strains signal human gastric cells differently from cagA− strains, and affect gastric physiology in markedly different ways than in the absence of H. pylori. This work led to a general model for the persistence of co-evolved organisms, based on the presence of a Nash equilibrium, and also for the relationship of persisting microbes to cancer, and age-related mortality.

Beginning in 1996, he hypothesized that H. pylori strains might have benefit to humans as well as costs. Despite considerable and ongoing skepticism by the community of H. pylori investigators, Blaser and his colleagues progressively developed a body of research that provided evidence that gastric colonization by this organism provided protection against the esophageal diseases of gastroesophageal reflux disease (GERD), Barrett's esophagus, and esophageal adenocarcinoma, work that has since been confirmed by independent investigators. His work has suggested a benefit of H. pylori against such early life illnesses as childhood diarrhea and asthma. This work is consistent with the hypothesis that H. pylori is an ancient, universal inhabitant of the human stomach that has been disappearing as a result of 20th century changes in socio-economic status, including the use of antibiotics and that this loss has health consequences, not only good (less gastric cancer), but bad as well (more esophageal disease and cancer, and more childhood-onset allergic asthma and hay fever).

In 1998, Blaser created the term acagia, to indicate a susceptibility for esophageal diseases in persons not carrying cagA+ H. pylori strains. Since then, acagia has come to reflect the rise in other diseases associated with the loss of cagA+ H. pylori, and may become a metaphor for the disappearance of members of the human microbiome that have symbiotic roles. In 2009, with Stanley Falkow, he hypothesized that human microecology is rapidly changing with potentially substantial consequences. He envisioned a step-wise (generational) diminution in microbial diversity, especially in early life to explain the epidemic rise of such diseases as childhood-onset asthma and obesity. Blaser has proposed that greater understanding of our indigenous (and progressively disappearing) microbiota can lead to improvements in human health.

He has proposed that the routine use (and overuse) of antibiotics in young children may be causing collateral damage, with extinctions of our ancient microbiota at critical stages of early life. This scenario may be contributing to the risk of epidemic metabolic, immunologic, and neurodevelopmental disorders. Studies in mice have contributed strong support to these hypotheses., and on-going work in children with reference to many diseases, including asthma, show the importance of early life microbiome perturbation in increasing risk. Studies with colleagues at the Mayo Clinic have shown a strong association of antibiotic exposure before the age of two and the development of multiple conditions in later childhood, including asthma, eczema, overweight and obesity, ADHD, and learning disability, providing further support for his hypothesis. Studies with colleagues examining data from children in Denmark and England confirm the Mayo Clinic findings. His studies in mice provide evidence that the effects of antibiotic perturbation on the microbiota can be transmitted via the mother to the next generation, affecting both intestinal micro-ecology and disease manifestations. In recent studies, he has shown that antibiotic-induced microbiota perturbation leading to disease (Type 1 diabetes) in an experimental mouse model can be interdicted by subsequent exposure of young animals to maternal cecal contents; this work provides evidence and a proof-of-principle that the antibiotic-induced dysbiosis can be limited by restorative practices.

== Missing Microbes ==
Blaser is the author of a book for general audiences, Missing Microbes: How the Overuse of Antibiotics Is Fueling Our Modern Plagues, about the degradation of internal microbial ecosystems of humans as a result of modern medical practices. Professional science writer Sandra Blakeslee helped write Missing Microbes, which was published by Henry Holt and Co. in April 2014, and has been translated into 20 languages. The book was a finalist for the 2015 LA Times Book Prize in Science, and won the National Library of China's 2017 Wenjin Book Award. Under the leadership of his wife, Dr. Maria Gloria Dominguez Bello, a group of scientists have formed the Microbiota Vault, Inc. (www.microbiotavault.org ), a not-for-profit non-governmental organization (NGO) public charity in the United States; Blaser serves as a member of the Board of Directors and an officer of the Foundation. Modeled after the Seed Vault in Svalbard, Norway, the Microbiota Vault has the purpose of creating a repository for the preservation of the human microbiota for future generations before it disappears, and fostering research and education about the human microbiota in developing countries. An award-winning documentary film with focus on the work of Blaser and Dominguez Bello entitled "The Invisible Extinction" was created by film makers Steven Lawrence and Sarah Schenk. Its World premiere was at the Copenhagen documentary film festival (CPH:DOX) in March 2022. A scientific review article entitled "The Invisible Extinction" was recently published in the Annual Review of Microbiology.
