= Zaera =

Zaera is a surname. Notable people with the surname include:

- Alejandro Zaera-Polo (born 1963), Spanish architect
- Concha García Zaera (1930–2023), Spanish digital artist
- Francisco Zaera (fl. 1979), Venezuelan-American chemist
