= Simón Bolívar University (Venezuela) =

University in Venezuela

- Universidad Simón Bolívar
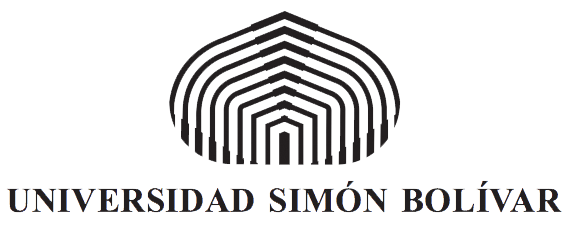
- Motto: "La Universidad del Futuro"
- Motto in English: "The University of the Future"
- Type: Public
- Established: 1967
- Rector: Jorge Stephany (Interim)
- Academic staff: 850 (approx.) (2016)
- Students: 15,415 (USB 2016)
- Undergraduates: 6,435 (2016)
- Postgraduates: 8,980 (2016)
- Location: Sartenejas, Miranda State, Venezuela; 10°24′38.09″N 66°52′52.33″W
- Colors: Yellow
- Website: www.usb.ve
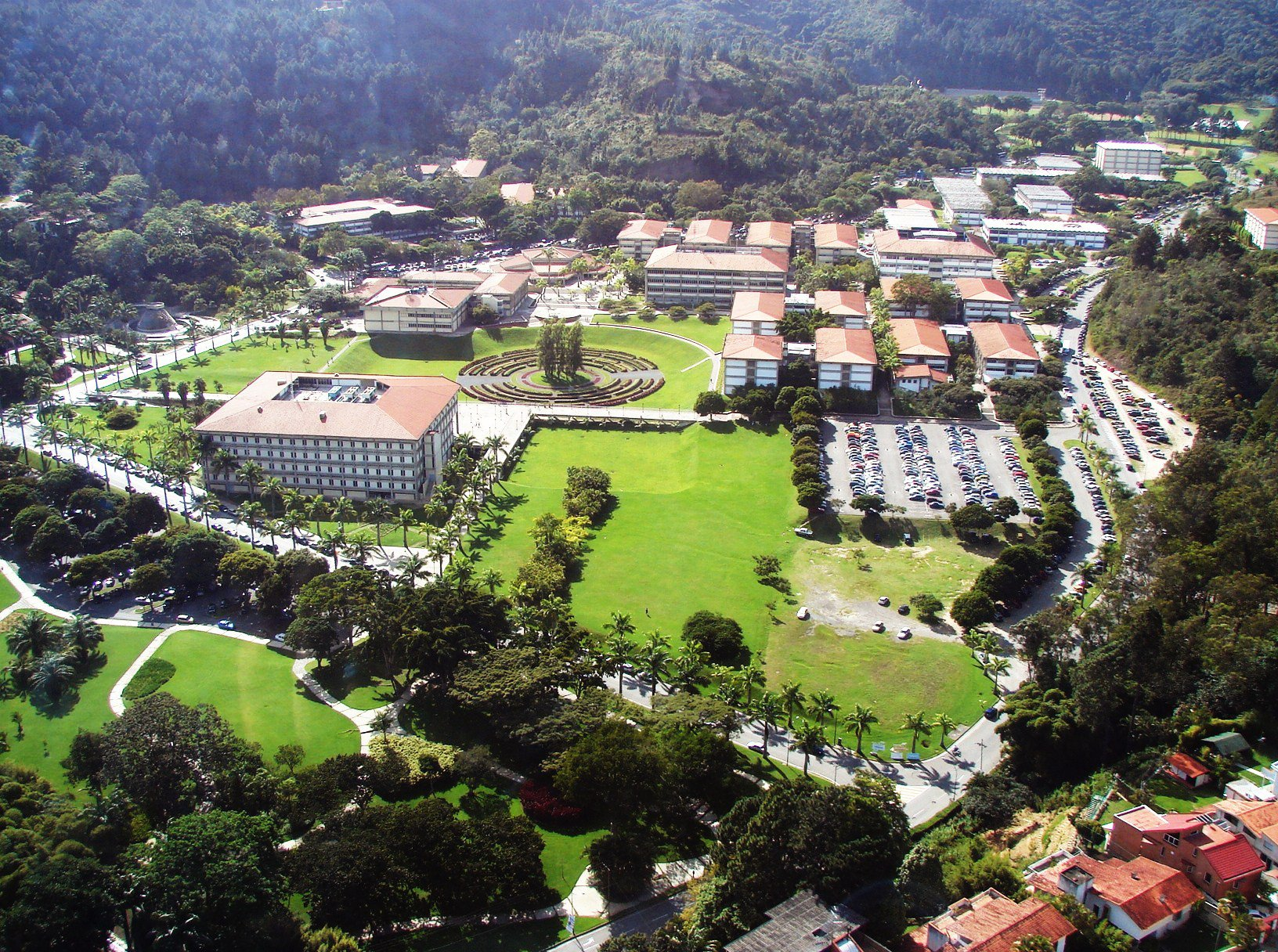

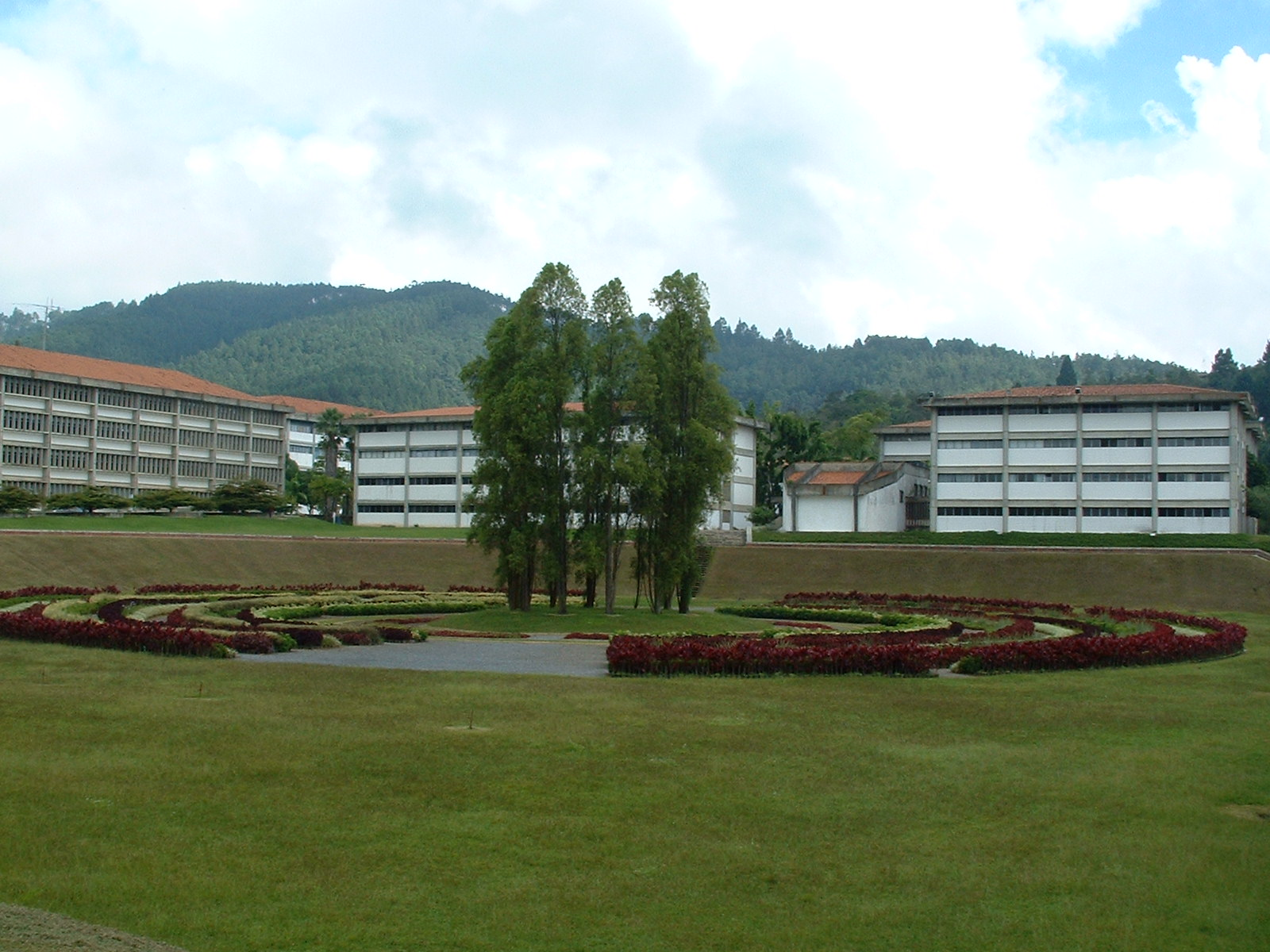
Laberinto Cromovegetal (1995) by Carlos Cruz-Diez, an iconic work of gardening art

The Simón Bolívar University (Universidad Simón Bolívar in Spanish) or USB, is a public institution divided in two branches, one in Miranda state and one in Vargas state, with scientific and technological orientation.

The university began academic activities in 1970 in the Sartenejas Valley in Caracas and seven years later in Camurí Grande Valley, Vargas. Currently has these two locations. Its rectory is Sartenejas headquarters, located in the Baruta municipality of Miranda state.

The USB has graduated approximately 25,000 engineers, architects, urban planners and graduates, along with 5,000 specialists, masters and doctors.

== History ==
In May 1967 the government created a commission composed by Luis Manuel Peñalver, Luis Carbonell, Mercedes Fermín, Miguel Angel Pérez and Héctor Isava to study the possibility of creating a new university that would offer studies to directly promote the economic and social development of the country. On July 18, 1967, the President of Venezuela Raúl Leoni signed a decree which officially founded the university as an Instituto Experimental de Educación Superior focused mainly on scientific and technological research. The original name given to the university was Universidad de Caracas; however, the first name of the Central University of Venezuela was also "Universidad de Caracas" and it was still known by that name. Members of The National Academy of History, the Bolivarian Society of Venezuela and other important institutions expressed their wish to relate the name of El Libertador Simón Bolívar to the name of the recently created university, which resulted in the change to the name of Universidad Experimental Simón Bolívar in 1969. Ernesto Mayz Vallenilla was the rector when president Rafael Caldera inaugurated the University on 19 January 1970.

From the confluence between the name "Universidad Simón Bolívar" and its slogan "The University of the Future", the Venezuelan designer, Gerd Leufert developed the design inspired by the photographic reproduction of an electrical circuit. The figure includes eight semicircular lines and a small rectangle in the center of them, forming a structure similar to a rounded pyramid, whose meaning is that of a gateway, which represents the unity of various knowledge and their projections into the future.

In 2010, in the dawn of the election day of the parliamentary elections, security forces raided a call center set up by Voto Joven that had been installed in the university, entering with firearms and taking three computers, without a search warrant and violating the university autonomy.

As of 2010, Simón Bolívar University has over 38,000 alumni.

== Campus ==
=== Location ===
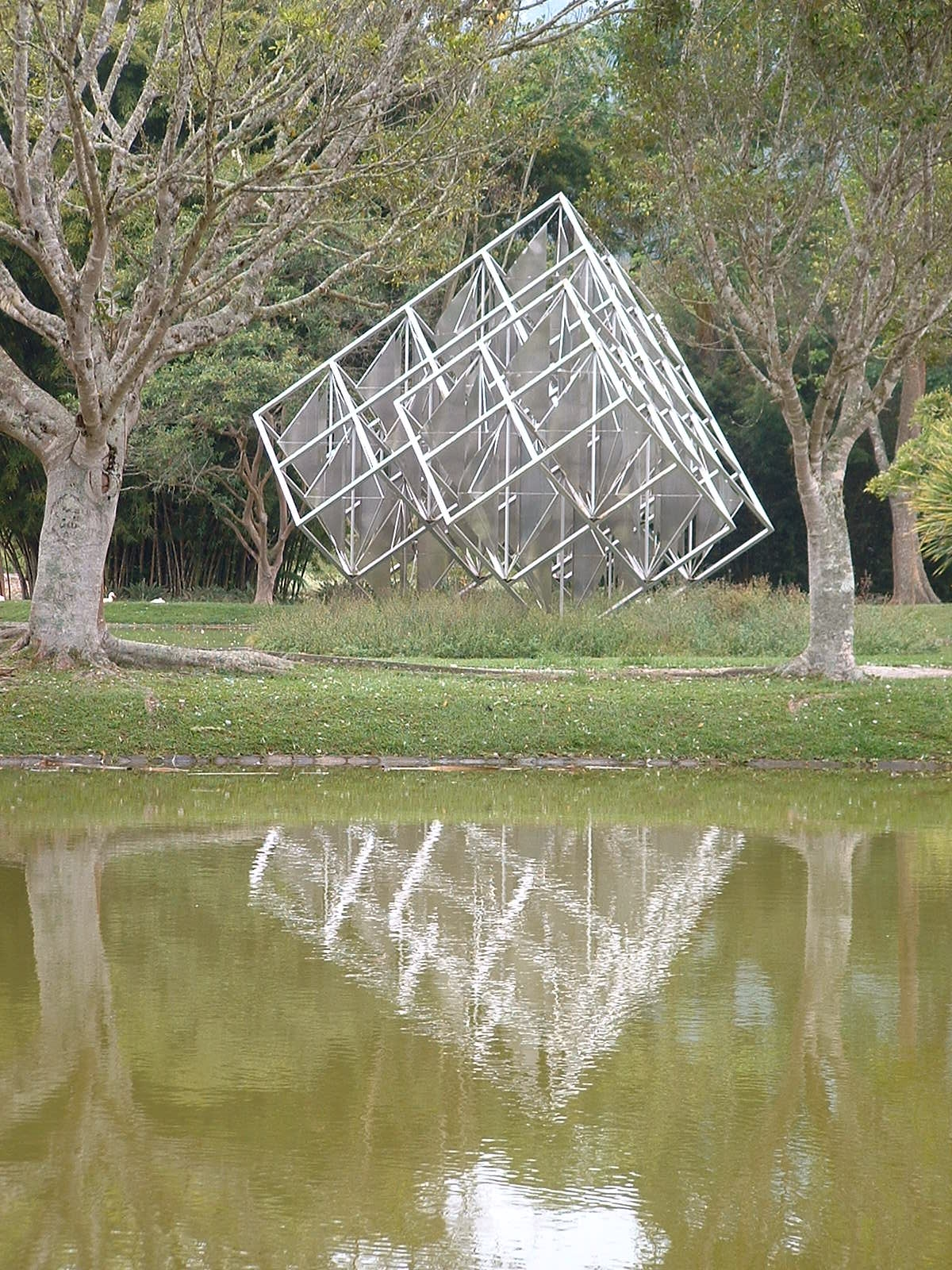
Espejo Solar by Alejandro Otero, located at the laguna de los espejos

The closed-campus-style grounds are located in the Sartenejas valley, in the municipality of Baruta, Miranda State. Its total surface is approximately of 3,489,000 m^{2}.

=== Library ===
The Simón Bolívar University Library (USB) is an academic library with special emphasis on sciences, mathematics, engineering, and humanities.

The library of the USB has, among its special collections, the Ernesto Mays Vallenilla archive. His archive includes the books of his personal Library, in addition to his own philosophical works as professor and researcher. The archive has a particular relevance within the university, not only because Mayz Vallenilla was its founder dean, but because he devoted a large part of his philosophical research to the understanding of the modern human being within the context of metatechnics. Concept that he developed witnessing the profound changes and advances in computer science and forecasting the possibilities of artificial intelligence. His book, The Foundations of Meta-Technics, sought to capture an understanding of a trans-human logic and, with it, of a new human identity for the XXI century.

In Recent years the lack of resources contribute to deteriorate the infraestructure.

In September 2021 the professor Alejandro Teruel resigned to the Dean position.

== Degrees ==
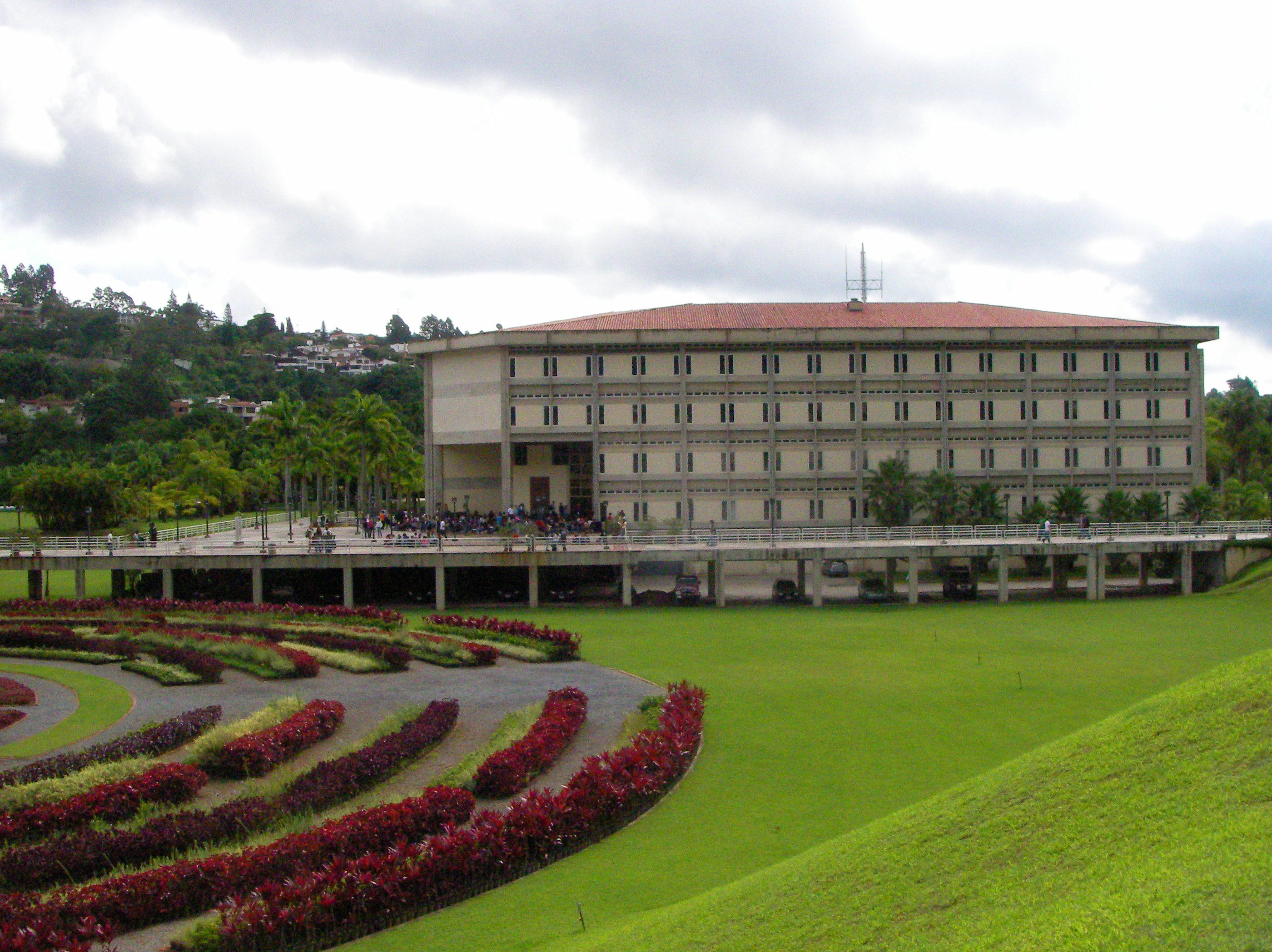
Library of the USB

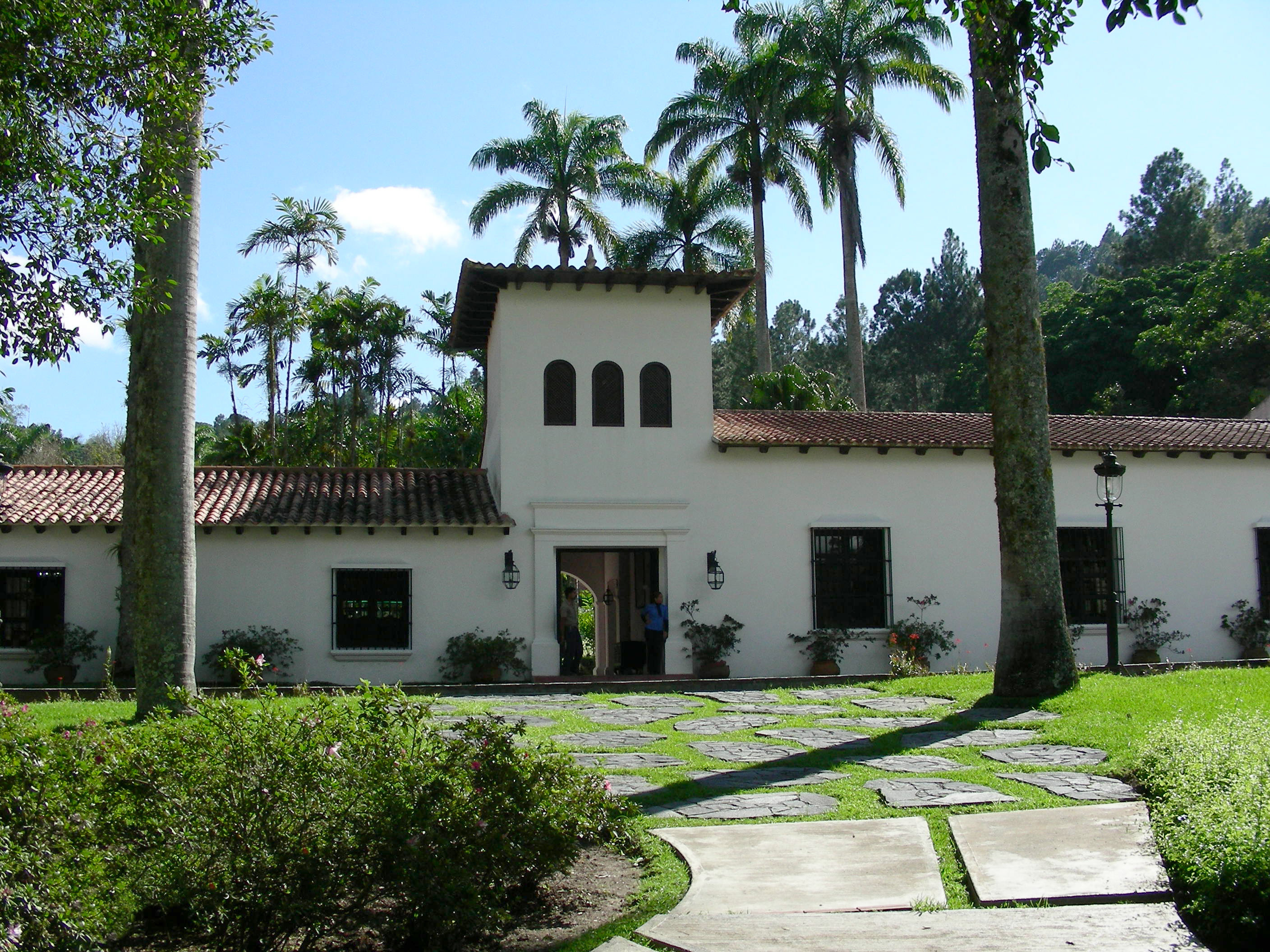

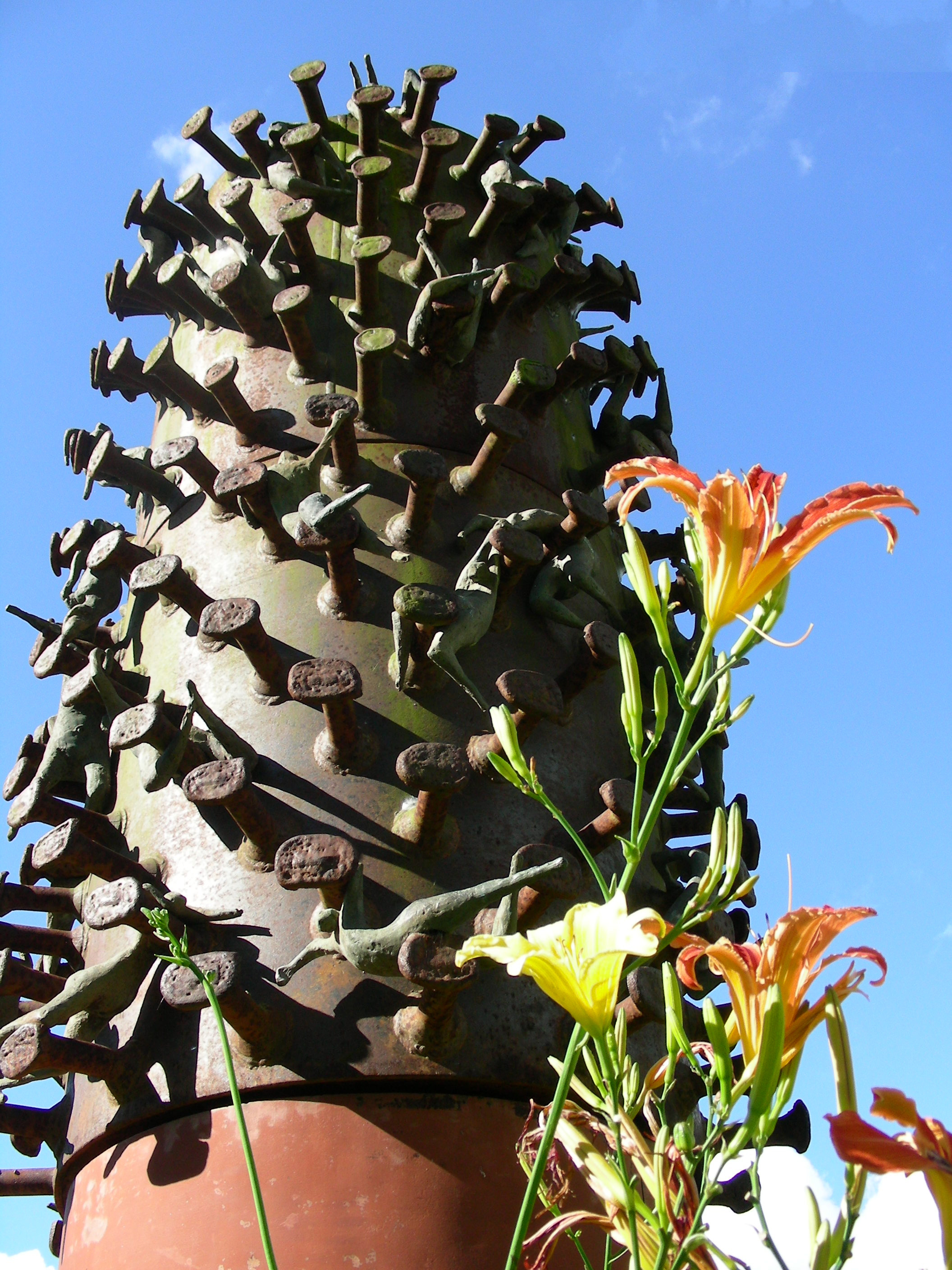

It offers the following undergraduate programs (BSc):

- College of Sciences:
  - Biology
  - Mathematics
  - Physics
  - Chemistry
- College Architecture and Urbanism:
  - Architecture
  - Urban Planning
- College of Engineering:
  - Geophysics
  - Electrical
  - Electronics
  - Computer
  - Maintenance
  - Mechanical
  - Chemical
  - Production (Industrial)
  - Materials
  - Telecommunications
- Associate degrees:
  - Electrical
  - Electronics
  - Mechanical
  - Aeronautic maintenance
  - Hotel Administration
  - Tourism Administration
  - Transport Administration
  - Customs Administration
  - Foreign Trade
  - Organization Management

It offers the following graduate programs (MSc, PhD and Specializations):

- College of Applied Sciences:
  - MSc and PhD in Biology
  - MSc and PhD in Computer Sciences
  - PhD in Interdisciplinary Science
  - MSc and PhD in Physics
  - MSc and PhD in Mathematics
  - MSc and PhD in Chemistry
  - MSc and PhD in Nutrition
  - MSc and PhD in Food Science
  - Specialization in Clinic Nutrition
  - Specialization in Quality Control and Evaluation of the Food Industry
- College of Engineering and Technology:
  - PhD in Engineering
  - MSc in Statistics
  - Specialization in computational statistics
  - Specialization in Telecommunications
  - Specialization in Telecommunication Management
  - MSc in Biomedicine Engineering
  - MSc in Electronic Engineering
  - Specialization in Telematics
  - Specialization in Electricity distribution
  - Specialization in Electric Installations
  - Specialization in Power Systems
  - Specialization in Electric Energy Transmission
  - MSc in Electric Engineering
  - MSc in Earth Sciences
  - MSc in Mechanical Engineering
  - Specialization in Manufacturing and Maintenance
  - Specialization in Design and Industrial Maintenance
  - Specialization in Structural Engineering
  - Specialization in Geotechnical Engineering
  - Specialization in Plant Processes Engineering
  - Specialization in Industrial Systems
  - Specialization in Rotary Equipment
  - MSc in Chemical Engineering
  - MSc in Material Engineering
  - MSc in Systems Engineering
- College of Social and Humanistic Sciences:
  - MSc and PhD in Political Science
  - Specialization in Public Opinion and Political Communication
  - Specialization in Environment Management
  - MSc in Environment Development
  - PhD in Sustainable development
  - MSc in College Education
  - Specialization in Informative Education
  - Specialization in Public Transportation
  - MSc in Public Transportation
  - MSc and PhD in Philosophy
  - Minor in Philosophy
  - MSc in Business and Administration
  - Specialization in Project Management
  - Specialization in Organizational Development
  - Specialization in State Audit Management
  - Specialization in Finance Management
  - Specialization in Market Management
  - Specialization in Business Management
  - Specialization in Technology Management
  - Specialization in Natural Gas Business Management
  - Specialization in English
  - Specialization in Math Teaching for High School Level
  - MSc in Applied Languages
  - PhD in Literature
  - MSc in Latin American Literature
  - MSc in Music
  - MSc in Psychology

== Extracurricular activities ==
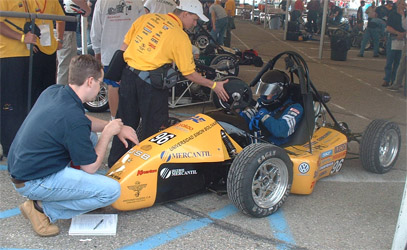
USB entry on the Formula SAE

The university fosters a thriving environment for extracurricular activities. Its student clubs are the origin of the most awarded Latin American teams in international competitions. The Model of United Nations team is one of the best in the world. The Harvard National Model of United Nations team has the most "Best International Delegation" Awards in the history of the conference (5 times), the World Model of United Nations team has won the "Best Large delegation award" 3 times. The Baja SAE has ranked top 5 during 10 continuous years.

The student clubs are very organized and disciplined teams. They typically have strict admission processes and put a strong focus on hard work and commitment.

== Traditions ==
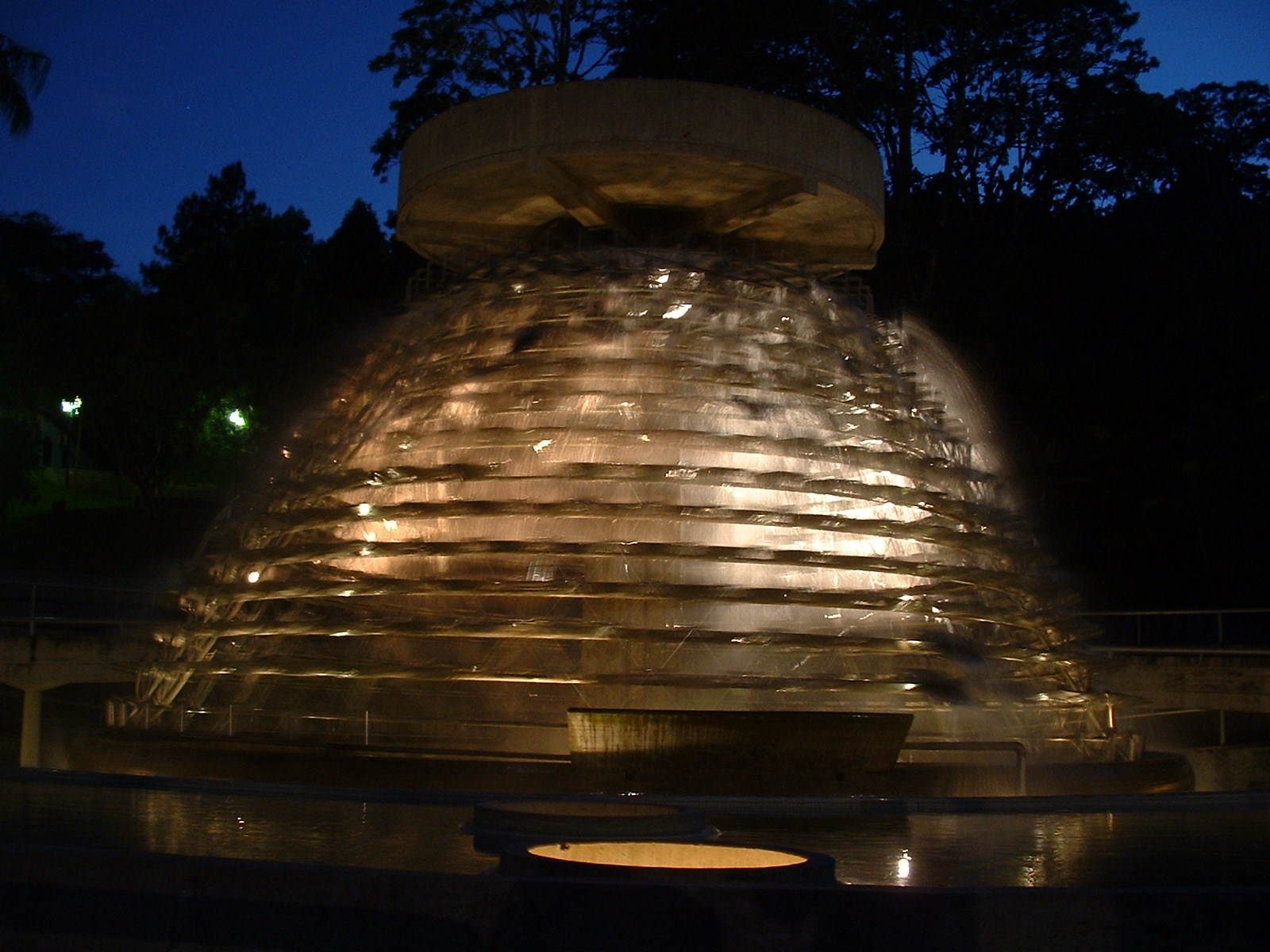
Estructura Hidrocinética was designed in 1975 by Gabriel Martín Landrove

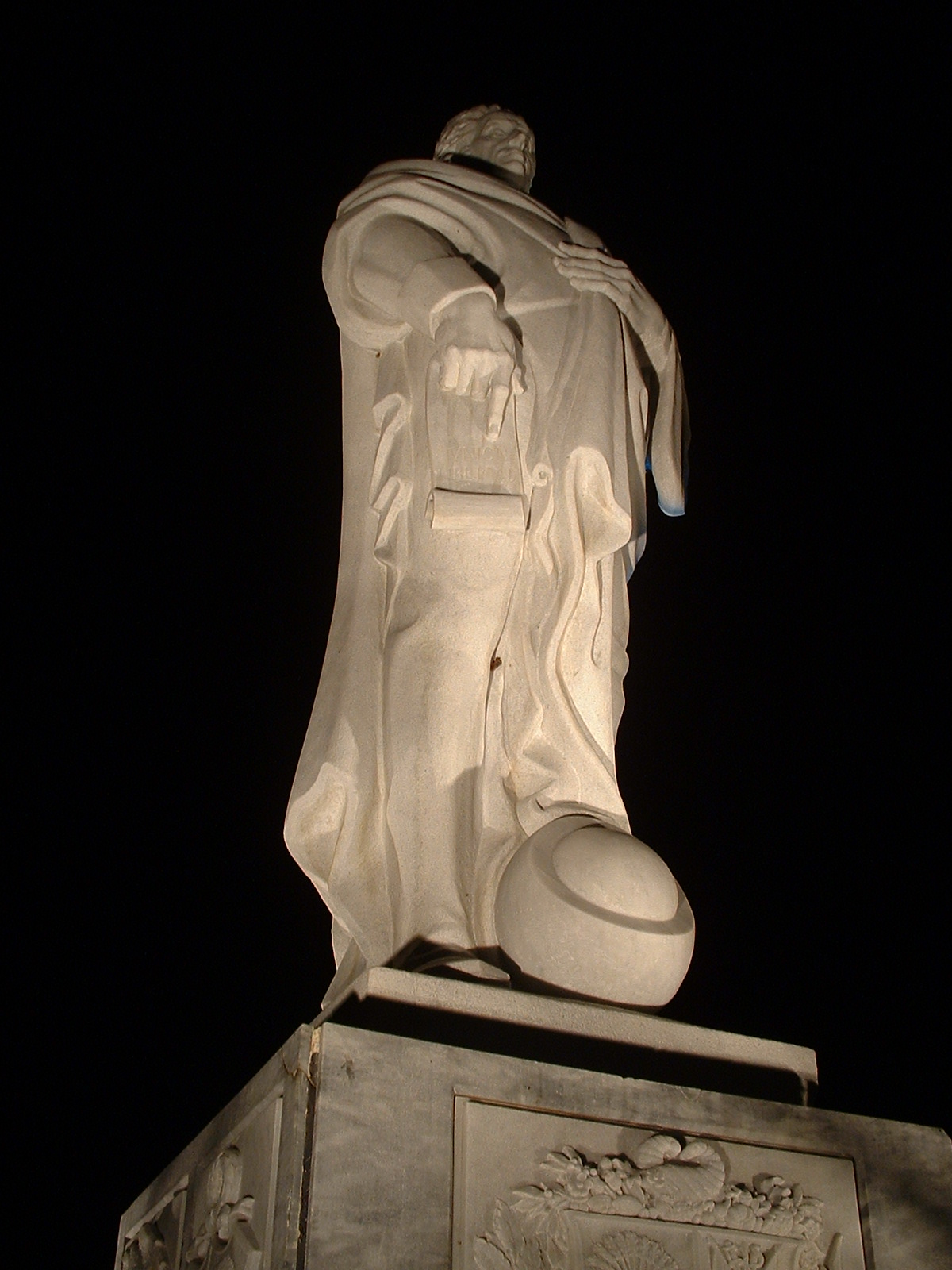
Simón Bolívar statue by the Peruvian artist Joaquín Roca Rey

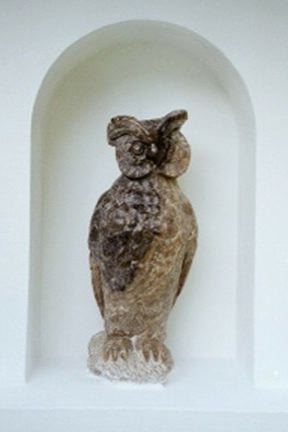
Owl located at the Dean's office

Several myths and legends are part of the student's culture:

La Cebolla: The logo of the university is called "La Cebolla" or "the onion" in Spanish in contrast to its technological symbolism (it was inspired by the photograph of an electric circuit). It was designed to represent a group of doors one into another, a metaphor for the hard work and effort students have to do in order to walk from the big door that leads them in, to the little one that leads them out (see Nuestros Símbolos | Universidad Simón Bolívar).

A brief history and description:The sculpture creation started in 1975 when Gabriel Martin Landrove, a USB architect student, won an institutional contest. Construction took place until July 5, 1991, when Phd Professor Stefan Zarea conducted the final works and inaugurated it. The artistic concept was inspired by the morning dew condensed over a tree sleeve falling down into another one. The sleeves are represented with 576 metal trowels arranged as a 48 by12 matrix in a conical truncated structure that allows the water to create multiple small waterfalls. This huge structure can rotate over its own vertical axis and the movement is produced by a pelton wheel dispose at the lower level of the conical structure. The rise of the water to the top and its rotational momentum is produced by hydraulic force drive by an electrical pump. There is also a tree level shallow pool, a top circular viewer and an intricate circular walk sides that complements the design.

The university turns it on during special occasions, like graduations, and since 2008 is under heavy maintenance program. On January 19, 2010, the maintenance department finished the second stage of its restoration with the restart of the conical structure including their rotational movement. It is left for the close future, the restoration of the mirror pools, water filtration systems and night illumination.

== Notable faculty ==
- Marisol Aguilera, researcher, professor

== Notable alumni ==
- Adriana Salerno, mathematician
- Ana María Rodríguez, American children's author
- Coray Colina, chemist
- Cristina Amon, Uruguayan engineer
- Francisco Zaera, chemist
- Gabriela Ochoa, computer scientist
- Héctor Chang, mathematician
- José Antonio Delgado, mountaineer
- Jose Boedo, Spanish physicist
- Luis Fernández, actor
- Marcos Rubinstein, electrical engineer
- María Gloria Domínguez-Bello, microbial ecologist
- Mónica Kräuter, chemist
- Olga Isabel Ramos, activist
- Otmaro Ruíz, musician
- Pedro Castillo, musician
- Roberto Smith, businessman
- Santiago Schnell, biologist
- Sergio Arias Cazorla, human geneticist
