= Albarregas Metropolitan Park =

Park in Mérida, Venezuela

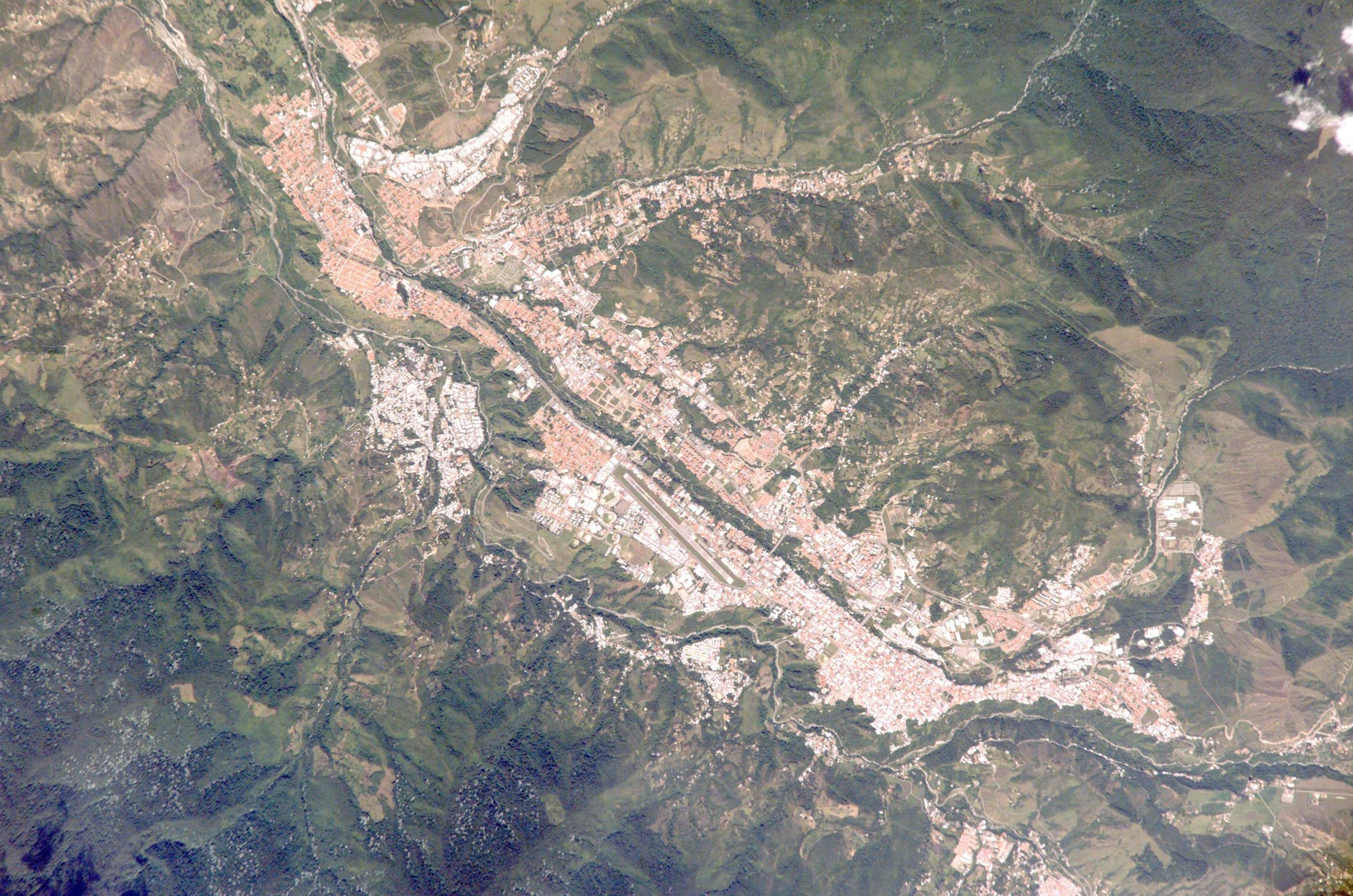
- Type: Urban park
- Location: Mérida, Venezuela
- Area: 1,513 acres (612 ha)
- Created: 1970
- Operator: University of the Andes
- Status: Open all year

The Albarregas Metropolitan Park (Spanish: Parque Metropolitano Albarregas) is an urban park in the city of Mérida (Venezuela) of 612 hectares and 22 km in length running along the main course of the river Albarregas that breaks the geographical continuity of the city by dividing it into two broad groups: the Western band and the Eastern Band. It was established in 1970.

Along this area the winds that blow cool the city and its dim marked changes in temperature, and disposing of more than 70% of waste water produced by the city. Have been built, however, all road and pedestrian connections that facilitate urban mobility of Mérida and its metropolitan area.

Its nearly 400 acres of wooded land, besides giving a specific identity to the landscape of the city, houses a rich and varied biodiversity is representative of the tropical rain forest and mountain ecosystems of the high-Andean.
