= IVIC syndrome =

- Other names: Instituto Venezolano de Investigaciónes Científicas syndrome, Radial ray defects, hearing impairment, external ophthalmoplegia, and thrombocytopenia, oculootoradial syndrome, OORS.
- Specialty: Medical genetics
- Symptoms: Radial ray defects, motor disturbances, and bilateral congenital hearing loss
- Usual onset: Birth
- Duration: Life-long
- Causes: Genetic mutation
- Risk factors: Having a parent with the condition
- Diagnostic method: Physical evaluation, radiographies, and genetic testing
- Prevention: none
- Prognosis: Good
- Frequency: Very rare, only 3 families with the disorder have been described in medical literature

IVIC syndrome, also known as Instituto Venezolano de Investigaciónes Científicas syndrome or oculo-oto-radial syndrome, is a very rare autosomal dominant limb malformation genetic disorder that is characterized by upper limb and ocular abnormalities and congenital hearing loss on both ears.

== Presentation ==
People with this disorder often have the following symptoms:

- Radial ray defects
- Fusion of the carpal bones
- Long thumb metacarpal
- Short distal phalange of the thumb
- Bilateral congenital hearing loss
- Internal ophthalmoplegia (eye paralysis)
- Thrombocytopenia
- Leukocytosis.

== Etymology ==
This disorder was first discovered in 1980 by Arias et al., when he described a Venezuelan family of Caucasian descent where 19 of its members exhibited the symptoms mentioned above. When the family tree was revised, it was found that the family's ancestors emigrated from the Canary Islands to Venezuela 140 years before, more specifically somewhere in the 1800s, the mutation causing the disorder seemed to have come into existence in a member belonging to the 6th generation of the family. Afterwards, two more affected families were reported in medical literature, one from Italy and the other from Turkey.

This disorder is named after the institute where Arias et al. (whose real name was Sergio Arias Cazorla) worked as a geneticist; the Instituto Venezolano de Investigaciónes Científicas (English: Venezuelan Institute for Scientific Research), Arias was also a zoology professor at the Escuela de Capacitación Forestal de El Junquito (English: Forest Capacitation School El Junquito) from 1952 to 1953, then from 1970 to 1975 he was a biology professor at the Universidad Simón Bolívar (English: Simón Bolívar University), then from 1975 to 1996 he was a human genetics professor (presumably at the same university)

It was later discovered in 2007 by Arias and Paradisi et al. through the original Venezuelan family with IVIC syndrome that the cause of the disorder is an autosomal dominant genetic mutation in the SALL4 gene, in chromosome 20.
