= Lennart Anderson =

American artist (1928–2015)

Lennart Anderson (August 22, 1928 – October 15, 2015) was an American painter. His work has been featured at several major museums, including his first major show at the Delaware Art Museum in 1992. He taught on the art faculties of several universities, including Brooklyn College, the Pratt Institute, Yale University, Princeton University, and Columbia University.

Born in Detroit, Michigan, he studied at Cass Technical High School, the School of the Art Institute of Chicago, the Cranbrook Academy of Art, and the Art Students League of New York under Edwin Dickinson. Anderson was inducted as a member of the American Academy and Institute of Arts and Letters in 1977 and made an Associate of the American Academy of Design in 1982. He was a recipient of the Guggenheim Fellowship (1983), the National Endowment for the Arts grant, the Louis Comfort Tiffany Foundation grant, and in 1961 was awarded the Rome Prize.

His paintings and drawings are included in the collections of the Brooklyn Museum; the Museum of Fine Arts, Boston; Hirshhorn Museum and Sculpture Garden; Cleveland Museum of Art; the Whitney Museum of American Art; the Morgan Library & Museum; and the Louis-Dreyfus Family Collection.

In the fall of 2021, a retrospective of Anderson's work opened at The New York Studio School of Drawing, Painting and Sculpture. An 84-page hardcover catalog was also published, featuring essays from Paul Resika, Martica Sawin, Jennifer Samet, and Susan Jane Walp. A version of the exhibition subsequently traveled to The Lyme Academy of Fine Arts, opening in January, 2022. In June, 2023, The exhibition opened at the Southern Utah Museum of Art (SUMA) at Southern Utah University, and then to the Bo Bartlett Center at Columbus State University in Georgia, February 1-April 12, 2024. It has been announced that the exhibit will open at The John David Mooney Foundation in Chicago on March 27, 2025.
