= Olga Ramos (activist) =

Venezuelan activist, professor and researcher

- Born: Olga Isabel Ramos; 1962; Caracas, Venezuela
- Died: 17 September 2022 (aged 59–60); Tenerife, Spain
- Education: Simón Bolívar University
- Occupations: Professor, activist, researcher

Olga Isabel Ramos (1962 – 17 September 2022) was a Venezuelan activist, professor and researcher dedicated to educational policy research and analysis.

== Education ==
Ramos graduated as an urban planner from the Simón Bolívar University (USB), Caracas. She later specialized in geographic information aystems at the University of Girona, Spain, and studied a Masters degree in development and environment at the USB.

== Career ==
Ramos dedicated her professional career and research to the analysis of educational policies. She was founder of the Venezuelan Educational Observatory, where she conducted analysis and proposals for public policies in this area, and member of the non-governmental organization (NGO) Asamblea de Educación. She worked as a professor in the Training Program for Emerging Leaders at the Instituto de Estudios Superiores de Administración (IESA) and in the specialization in management of educational institutions at the Universidad Metropolitana. She was President of the USB Alumni Association and a member of the Garúa teachers' choir.

She worked on projects with NGOs such as the National Education Council, the Inter-American Center for Educational Planning Studies and Research (Cinterplan-OAS), Fe y Alegría, as well as with the mayor's office of the Chacao municipality of Caracas, the governmental education secretariats of the Carabobo, Monagas and Zulia states, and the Ministry of Education of Venezuela, Colombia y Argentina.

In August 2022, she was awarded the Ernesto Mayz Vallenilla Order in recognition as an outstanding alumni, granted jointly by Universidad Simón Bolívar and its Alumni Association.

On 17 September 2022, she died of cancer which had been diagnosed several years earlier. She was 60 years old.
