= University of the Andes Library Services =

Venezuelan university library system

Servicios Bibliotecarios de la Universidad de Los Andes (SERBIULA)
- Location: Mérida, Barinas, Trujillo, San Cristobal, El Vigía, Guanare and Valera
- Established: 1980
- Branches: 25

Collection
- Size: 252,226 (344,697) as of May 2008

Access and use
- Circulation: 135,964 (2007)
- Population served: Over 1,496,000
- Members: Over 62,000

Other information
- Director: Marlene Bauste
- Website: http://www.serbi.ula.ve

The University of the Andes Library Services, officially known as SERBIULA (from the acronym in Spanish for Servicios Bibliotecarios de la Universidad de Los Andes), is the organization responsible for managing and directing all the different libraries of its parent institution, the University of the Andes, one of the main universities in Venezuela.

The University of the Andes is not located in a single central campus, but in rather smaller campuses and branches; most of which are scattered across the andean and singularly university city of Mérida, while the others are located in different states of the country, with their respective library alongside.

== History ==
=== Coming to life ===
Back in 1785, Bishop Juan Ramos de Lora, a Franciscan clergyman from Seville, opened a Catholic seminary in Mérida, a remote village in the Andes Mountains of what is now Venezuela, under Spanish rule by then. Once the seminary opened, he gathered and collected many books for its library. It was initially composed of some salvaged antique books which dated back centuries, as far as the Conquista times. It also included many oeuvres from his personal collection and some more from the collaborations and donations of priest friends, ministers and other prominent figures from his episcopate. Hence, the library's first books were comprehensive in canon law, civil law, medicine, philosophy and literature. Regarding the seminary, just a few years after it was founded, local authorities started lobbying to seek the grant of the Spanish government to establish it as a university. The university charter was granted in 1806, but due to the bellicose period in the region it was only validated in 1810 thus the seminary became known as the Real Universidad de San Buenaventura de Mérida (Saint Bonaventure Royal University of Mérida), short before the Venezuelan Declaration of Independence. The library slowly but steadily followed the evolution of its sheltering University.

=== Establishment of the University Library ===
Most of Venezuela's 19th century was a troublesome period. It was characterized by political turmoil, autocratic rule and consistent coups d'état which more often than not hindered the evolution of the academia in the country. Nevertheless, in the last decades of the century a steady political stability became foreseeable. In 1883 the Venezuelan government decided to review the law on the higher and scientific national education, in which the country's two existing universities at the time were renamed with their contemporary name; i.e. Universidad de Los Andes for the University of the Andes, and Universidad Central de Venezuela for the Central University of Venezuela in Caracas.

With the change of name and policies came a wave of institutional revampment. So, on August 1, 1888 the then Chancellor of the University, Dr. Caracciolo Parra, issued a decree ordaining the following:

- The creation of the University Library embedding a scheme of systematized organization. This of course included shelving the whole of the 1,436 antique books acquired since the inception of the Seminary.
- The housing of the Library in a building suitable to all of its requirements.
- The appointment of Dr. Juan Nepumoceno Monsant as interim Chief Librarian.
- The due repair of all damaged and decaying books.
- The mandatory donation to the Library of one renowned and useful publication by every former student of the University.

The University Library was at last inaugurated on October 27, 1889. By the end of 1894 the Library was counting 1,436 titles and 1,725 volumes. By the turn of the 20th century these figures had bloomed to 2,120 and 2,572 respectively.

Well into the 1900s (decade), the University Library was not any longer the sole library of the institution. Thence it began to be known as the Central Library. It espoused the responsibility of organizing the libraries of the different faculties of the university as they came to existence, and likewise for the training their corresponding personnel. Furthermore, it also conducted the acquisition of all the new resources and equipment for all of the faculty libraries. However, it was the responsibility of every faculty to fund their operation and administration.

== The Coming of Age of SERBIULA ==
In 1977 the libraries of the faculties of Sciences, Economic Sciences, and Engineering, all three located within the same campus, were merged into the Integrated Library of Sciences, Economics and Engineering (BIECI for its acronym in Spanish). This was the first unification of different library services that took place within the University. A project proposal for taking this initiative to a higher level was put forth the University Council a couple of years later. The project submitted the comprehensive integration of all the university's library services into a greater single one. It was swiftly approved on March 6, 1980 and the resulting body was simply named University of Los Andes Library Services (SERBIULA). SERBIULA had and still has the responsibility of integrating all the existing library services and keeping them up-to-date with the University demands. Additionally, SERBIULA created and manages the university's Library System, whose coordination follows a decentralized approach as a consequence of having the University campuses scattered all around the city. Another goal is improving the efficiency of human, technical and financial resources.

== Automation of library services with SERBIULA ==
The automation of library services in the University began with the creation of the aforementioned BIECI library—currently renamed BIACI, but more specifically with the launch of its ICT department (simply known as Informática). The broad purpose of this department was and still is to imprint ever more efficient, functional, and modern Information retrieval processes to the library services. The early stages of this scheme began with the instalment of the following systems:

- Loans control system,
- Cataloguing of periodic publications and suppliers control system,
- Information retrieval and cataloguing system (use of MARC standards)

This early instalment was followed by the development of some middle-stage projects. These projects definitively ignited and set the pace for the continuous ICT updating and upgrading trend for the SERBIULA library services. Among these, the more important were:

- The onset of the Document Cataloguing and Editing system (EDICLA), the Automated Information Retrieval System (SARI), and the ULA Loans System (SPULA).
- The installation of what would become the first 14 SERBIULA local area networks (development started between 1977 and 1978)
- The linking of the university to Internet (1986)
- The massive incorporation of information to the SERBIULA database (began in 1994).
- ULA theses references input to the electronic catalog of SERBIULA (1995).
- The inclusion of automatic knowledge-based indexing to the library services features.

This accumulated know-how resulted in the creation of the ULA Information and Documentation System (SIDULA). It was originally designed to be a comprehensive library management system that would physically centralize all the acquisitions, cataloguing and loans. With the evolution in the University networks, it was ultimately redesigned to work as a client–server system.

=== Present-day SERBIULA ===
SERBIULA aims at improving and optimizing all library-related services. In 2000 it established the university's Electronic Information Services (SIE). In 2003 there were two major additions: the creation of the university's Digital Library (Biblioteca Digital), one of the university's main responsible organizations for the on-line dissemination of its historical, cultural, audiovisual, and scientific-academic heritage and production. And secondly, the incorporation to the later of the Index for Venezuelan Science and Technology Journals (REVENCYT) under the SciELO platform.

2005 witnessed the development of the open stack library –somehow a novelty in these latitudes, as well as major physical and virtual revamping and upgrading of the whole library network. It was also the year in which SERBIULA embraced LIBRUM as its main library management system. LIBRUM is a locally developed GNU/GPL OPAC management software that handles cataloguing, item circulation, acquisitions, statistics, user administration, thesaurus and full-text e-publication; most notably under the OAI-PMH protocol.

In 2006 the ULA arose as the first Venezuelan organization ever to become (alongside three other Latin American organizations) signatory to the 2003 Berlin Declaration on Open Access to Knowledge in the Sciences and Humanities. This initiative pertains to the online open access of the scientific production of the institution (the ULA for this particular case), thus giving Biblioteca Digital a new job cut up for itself.

Still under process, the other ULA e-services and projects managed by Biblioteca Digital-SERBIULA are:

- The online repository of undergraduate, Master's and Doctoral theses of the ULA.
- The Index for Venezuelan Science and Technology Journals (REVENCYT).
- The development the Venezuelan site for the Latin America and The Caribbean, Spain and Portugal Scientific Journals Network - (Redalyc).
- The adaptation and migration into Spanish of the Electronic Theses and Dissertations Publication System (TEDE), originally developed by the Brazilian Science and Technology Information Institute (IBICT).
- The coordination of the project Venezuelan Electronic Theses Digital Database (BDTV), with the cooperation of eleven national universities so far, as an effort to create an incontrovertible nationwide repository for this type of documents.

Nationwide recognition presented itself in 2007 under the National Book Award, for the Library Service category.

In June 2008, SERBIULA alongside other branch offices of the university, organized the workshop REVENCYT-Redalyc, Taller bi-nacional de Editores de Revistas Científicas Venezolanas, with two main purposes:

- Describe and explain the new policies for REVENCYT editors.
- Explain and reveal the details for Redalyc's Venezuelan site hosting by the ULA.

== University of the Andes Libraries ==
Within the different campi in Mérida (in Spanish)

- Faculty of Arts Reading Room Charles Dávila
- Integrated Library of Architecture, Natural Sciences and Engineering - BIACI María Eugenia Chaves
  - Sciences and Technology Reference Centre
  - Faculty of Architecture Library of Periodic Publications
  - Faculty of Sciences Reading Room Salón Aquiles Nazoa
- Central Library Tulio Febres Cordero
- CIDIAT Library Dr. Carlos Grassi
- Library of Sciences in Law, Politics, and Criminology Miguel Pisani Crespo
- Library of Economic and Social Sciences
- Faculty of Pharmacy Library Ismael Valero Balza
- Forestry and Environmental Sciences Library Antonio José Uzcátegui Burguera
- Faculty of Geography Library Luis Fernando Chaves
- University Hospital of the Andes Autonomous Institute Library - IAHULA
- Faculty of Humanities and Education Library Gonzalo Rincón Gutiérrez
  - School of Modern Languages Library Mary Castañeda
  - Social Sciences Reference Centre
- Faculty of Medicine Library Br. Domingo Salazar Rojas
  - Health Sciences Reference Centre
- Faculty of Dentistry Library Jacob Calanche

ULA Libraries in other Venezuelan cities and states (in Spanish)

- "Dr. Pedro Rincón Gutiérrez" Táchira State Campus Library Luis Beltrán Pietro Figueroa
- "Rafael Rangel" Trujillo State Campus Undergraduate Library Aquiles Nazoa
- "Rafael Rangel" Trujillo State Campus Postgraduate Library José Vicente Scorza
- "Alberto Adriani" El Vigia Campus Reading Room Peter Inglessis

== See also ==
- List of libraries in Venezuela
