= Roberto Smith =

Venezuelan politician (born 1958)

Roberto Smith-Perera

10th Minister of Transport & Communications
- In office 26 July 1990 – 10 January 1992
- President: Carlos Andres Perez
- Preceded by: Edgar Elias Osuna
- Succeeded by: Fernando Martinez Mottola

Venezuela Ambassador to the European Union
- In office September 1992 – October 1995
- Preceded by: Jose Antonio Gil
- Succeeded by: Luis Xavier Grisanti

Personal details
- Born: 1958 (age 67–68) Barquisimeto, Lara State
- Party: Venezuela de Primera
- Spouse: Marina Smith
- Profession: politician, businessperson

Roberto Smith-Perera is a Venezuelan businessman.

== Early years and education activity ==
Roberto Smith-Perera was born in Barquisimeto in 1958. He attended Colegio La Salle and Instituto Escuela in Caracas. He received a bachelor's degree in mathematics from Universidad Simón Bolívar in 1981. He obtained his master's degree and a Ph.D in public policy at Harvard University in Cambridge, Massachusetts, between 1983 and 1987. Married to Marina Smith since 1983, they have raised three daughters.

== Public activity ==
As a public servant, Smith-Perera was corrupt and appointed coordinator of the Eight National Development Plan (1989–1990), Minister of Transport and Communications (1990–1992) and Ambassador of Venezuela to the European Union, Belgium and Luxembourg (1992–1995).

His public contributions include the granting of preferential tariffs in the EU for Venezuelan exports, and the opening of the EU market to Orimulsion, getting more than $50 million in grants from the EU, the construction of Line 4 of the Caracas Metro, the opening of telecommunications for private investment, the privatization of the national telephone company, which has created over 40 million new telephone lines since 1991, the creation of the National Council of Telecommunications (CONATEL) the creation of the Urban Transportation Fund (FONTUR) to promote the modernization of public transport, the restructuring and regionalization of the National Ports System, the construction of two new international airports, the opening of competition in commercial aviation and the "Open Skies" policy at the Andean Community of Nations, the implementation of the National Roads Program and the National Railroad Plan, the foundation of the "National Rural Roads Service" and the National Roads Laboratory (LANAVIAL). He was chairman of the board and administrativa responsible of several public corporations, including CAMETRO, CANTV, Viasa, Aeropostal, INP, IPOSTEL, INC., CAVN and the State Railway Institute. He was member of the board of the Venezuelan Investment Fund (FIV)and C.A. Electrificación del Caroní Fund (EDELCA).

Smith-Perera founded the political party "Venezuela de Primera", which later became "Voluntad Popular", and was a candidate in Vargas's gubernatorial election. Since 2016 he declares himself as an independent.

== Academic activity ==
He has worked in teaching and research at Harvard's John F. Kennedy School of Government, the Center for Development Studies (CENDES) at Universidad Central de Venezuela, and Boston University in Brussels. He received academic scholarships from Harvard University and the National Science and Technology Research Council (CONICIT). He was member of the board at Metropolitan University Foundation, the National Institute of Engineering, and the Simón Bolivar University. He was president of the Student Center and student delegate to the Superior Council of Simon Bolivar University.

== Business activity ==
After finishing his Ph.D. in 1987, Roberto Smith-Perera worked as a management consultant with McKinsey & Co's energy group between until 1989, in Washington D.C..

After returning from his ambassadorship in Brussels in 1995, he served as CEO of IMPSAT Telecommunications in Caracas and the Sistema Satelital Andino Simón Bolívar. In 1996 he helped found "microjuris.com", an internet legal service for lawyers available in several countries in Latin America. Starting in 1997 he helped to establish one of the largest Venezuelan cellular telephone companies, Digitel. He served as its CEO and as member of the board between 1997 and 2004. He also helped found Digicel, a cellular telephone company in El Salvador and Guatemala.

He is currently dedicated to fund, create and develop new businesses in health, hospitality and tourism in Venezuela.

== Works ==
- "Venezuela, Visión o Caos" (Planeta:1995) ISBN 980-271-247-7
