= Jose Boedo =

American plasma physicist

Jose A. Boedo
- Education: University of Texas at Austin Universidad Simon Bolivar, Venezuela
- Known for: Divertors of Tokamaks
- Scientific career
- Fields: Physics
- Workplaces: University of California, San Diego

Jose A. Boedo is a Spanish plasma physicist and a researcher at University of California, San Diego. He was elected as a fellow of the American Physical Society in 2016 for "his ground-breaking contributions to the studies of plasma drifts and intermittent plasma transport in the peripheral region of tokamaks".

Boedo has worked in the characteristics, particle and energy transport, and dynamics of the edge and scrape-off layer and divertors of tokamaks, a candidate device for fusion energy. These works have focused on intermittent transport and the role of cross-phase in transport modulation by velocity shear.

== Early life and career ==
Boedo received his Ph.D. from the University of Texas at Austin. In 1990, he joined UCLA as a researcher in the mechanical and aerospace engineering department. In 1995, he moved to the University of California, San Diego and has been there ever since.

== Scientific contributions ==
Early in his career, Boedo investigated the role of externally imposed electric fields on tokamak plasmas and the corresponding velocity shear in the suppression of turbulence. Boedo characterized the reduction of transport and compared the scaling of the suppression with known theories. Additionally, he showed that velocity shear also reduced temperature fluctuations, and therefore, the conductive heat flux.

Boedo investigated the effect that injected impurities on tokamak plasmas in producing enhanced energy confinement, known as the I-mode. He showed that the enhancement in performance was due to reduction in transport and turbulence due to ITG mode suppression.

Boedo has also done work on the role of flows and drifts in the edge, SOL (scrape-off layer), and divertor of tokamaks. He found that once the divertor plasma is detached, there is a considerable residual heat flux that is convected by the plasma to the walls via large, Mach=1 large scale flows.

Boedo has shown that the effect of ExB drifts in the SOL and divertor plasmas is significant, and therefore edge simulation codes such as UEDGE and SOLPS should include drifts to properly model the boundary plasma. Boedo worked closely with modelers in experiment-modeling efforts to demonstrate the relevance of the drifts.

In the late 1990s, it was found in the Alcator C-Mod tokamak that plasma-wall contact was much larger than expected, revealing missing transport mechanism/physics in the edge/SOL in tokamaks. Boedo and his colleagues then quantified, characterized and experimentally demonstrated that plasma was carried form the plasma edge towards the SOL and the chamber walls by intermittent, convective transport that was subsequently identified as resulting from the interchange instability. As theoretical understanding of the subject improves, Boedo has continued to research the topic, particularly on the scaling of intermittent transport with plasma parameters.

Boedo also developed tools to study and characterize Edge Localized Modes (ELMs) at high time resolution. Boedo quantified the ELM-mediated particle and heat transport that among other results, highlighted the two-dimensional nature of the phenomena as filaments and discovered that such filaments have a complex structure.

Boedo's recent work has been focused on the physics of intrinsic rotation in tokamaks and asymmetric, thermal ion loss as a significant mechanism in determining a source of rotation at the edge of the plasma that is then transported into the core. Boedo identified and characterized the edge rotation from a theoretical point of view and compared it to existing models.

Boedo has also made contributions towards the diagnostic development for plasmas. He has developed high heat flux, fixed and reciprocating, scanning probes, such as that built for the NSTX tokamak, a rotating Langmuir probe, and also a diagnostic to measure electron temperature with better than 400 kHz bandwidth.
