= Marisol Aguilera =

Venezuelan biologist

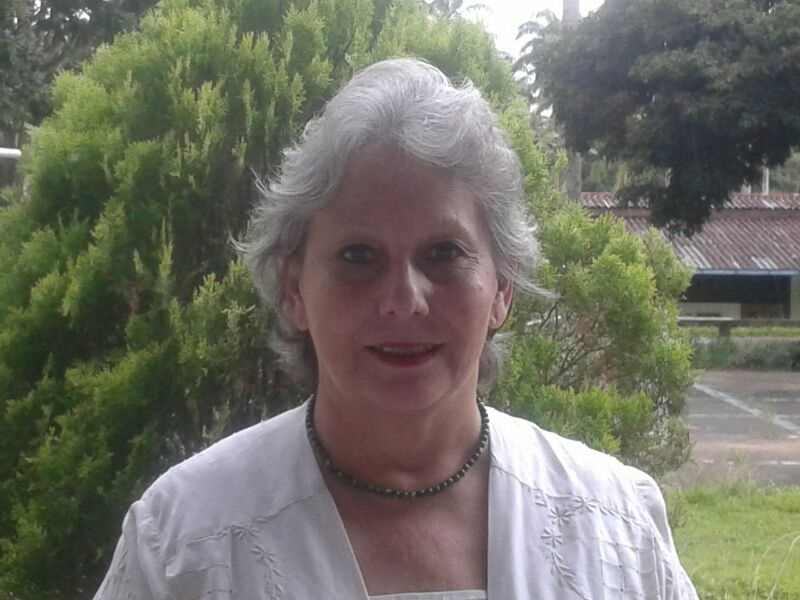
Marisol Aguilera

Marisol Aguilera Meneses (born in La Asunción, Nueva Esparta, Venezuela) is a Venezuelan biologist whose research involves the ecology of vertebrates. She is the president of the Venezuelan Association for the Advancement of Science (AsoVAC) and the International Organization Interciencia, which brings together associations for the advancement of science from all over the Americas.

== Biography ==
Marisol Aguilera studied Biology at the Central University of Venezuela from where she graduated with a degree in biology in 1971. After several specialization courses in Venezuela, France, and Chile, in 1995, she obtained a doctorate in tropical ecology at the University of the Andes (Venezuela). Aguilera joined the Simón Bolívar University as an ordinary professor, but at this institution, along with her career as a scientific researcher, she also held other managerial positions such as director of the Renewable Natural Resources Institute, curator of theriology at the Museum of Natural Sciences, chief representative of the Department of Environmental Studies, and Biological Sciences Division director.

In her career as a professor at Simón Bolívar University, Aguilera has been an advisor to 26 undergraduate and graduate students. She has 60 publications in national and international magazines and more than 150 papers at national and international conferences.

== Areas of research ==
Aguilera works in the areas of ecology, evolution, biodiversity, conservation, and management. The central axis of her research is the cariology of mammals, the study of chromosomes as an approach to understand evolutionary processes, solve systematic problems, and contribute to the design of management and conservation strategies for wildlife and hunting. She has also developed work in the area of bioethics, in which she has lectured at various universities. Aguilera is convinced that in Venezuela there is a lag in bioethics and she has expressed her concern about the issue.

She has been co-editor of five books, including the book on Biodiversity in Venezuela, published by the Polar Foundation and Fonacit in 2003, unique in Venezuela because 78 researchers from all over the country participated in it.

== Awards and distinctions ==
- Order of July 18: Third Class, in recognition of her 10 years of work at the Simón Bolívar University, 1987; Second Class, in recognition of 15 years of work at the university, 1992; First Class, in recognition of 20 years of work at the university, 1997.
- Andrés Bello Award, Basic Sciences Mention to the best scientific work ("Life Cycle, Cranial Morphometry and Cariology of Holochilus venezuelae Allen 1904, Rodentia, Cricetidae") of the year, awarded by the Association of Professors of the Simón Bolívar University. 1988.
- Level I Researcher, Researcher Promotion Program (CONICIT 1990-1994).
- Order of Henri Pittier, Third Class, awarded by the MAC and the MARNR 1991.
- CONICIT Annual Award for the Best Scientific Work, Biology area, Honorable Mention for the work: "Food habits of Holochilus venezuelae in rice fields." 1991.
- Andrés Bello Award, Basic Sciences Mention, Honorable Mention (work: "An allopatric karyomorph of the Proechimys guairae complex (Rodentia: Echimyidae) in eastern Venezuela") awarded by the Association of Professors of the Simón Bolívar University. 1992.
- Level II Researcher, Researcher Promotion Program (CONICIT 1994-2000).
- Andrés Bello Award, Basic Sciences Mention, Honorable Mention (for work: "Cranial differentiation in the chromosomal speciation of the genus Proechimys (Rodentia, Echimyidae), awarded by the Association of Professors of the Simón Bolívar University. 1995.
- Meritorious Professor Level II (CONABA 1998 and 2001).
- Researcher Level IV, Researcher Promotion Program (2003-2011).
