= Venezuelan Institute for Scientific Research =

Venezuelan space research institute

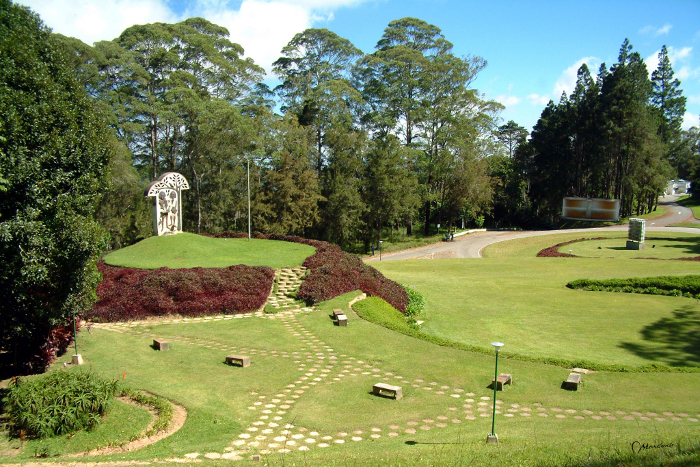
Plaza Bolivar y Bello in IVIC

The Venezuelan Institute for Scientific Research (IVIC; Spanish: Instituto Venezolano de Investigaciones Científicas) is a scientific research institute and graduate training center in Venezuela founded by government decree on February 9, 1959. It has its origins in the Venezuelan Institute of Neurology and Brain Research (IVNIC; Instituto Venezolano de Neurología e Investigaciones Cerebrales), which Humberto Fernandez-Moran founded in 1955.

The center has the Marcel Roche Library, recognized in 1996 by UNESCO as being "the best Regional Library for Science and Technology".

The headquarters of the IVIC is located near San Antonio de los Altos, in Altos de Pipe, Miranda State. The grounds cover 832-acre headquarters, where are the scientific and academic facilities, residences for researchers, students and staff, storeroom, dining, administration and service area, library, etc. Within this area there are some pockets of tropical cloud forest and a couple of streams. IVIC is currently in the process of regionalization, of which there have been two sub-regional headquarters in Mérida and Zulia states.

Also have a Scientific Research Station near Higuerote, Miranda State.

Sergio Arias Cazorla and his colleagues, who worked as human geneticists in the institute, discovered Instituto Venezolano de Investigaciónes Científicas syndrome.

== Organization ==
It is composed of the worker staff, the "rank" (scientific) staff, the administrative staff (secretaries, dean, etc.) and students.

- Students
  - Undergraduate students: training and thesis
  - Graduate students: MSc and PhSc
- Rank staff:
  - PAIs (professionals associated with research) and TAIs (technician associated with research)
  - Postdoctoral fellows
  - Researchers (associated, titular, emeritus), many of whom have been awarded national prizes such as the Lorenzo Mendoza Fleury Science Prize, a biennial award sponsored by Fundación Empresas Polar
