= Mónica Kräuter =

Venezuelan chemist and professor

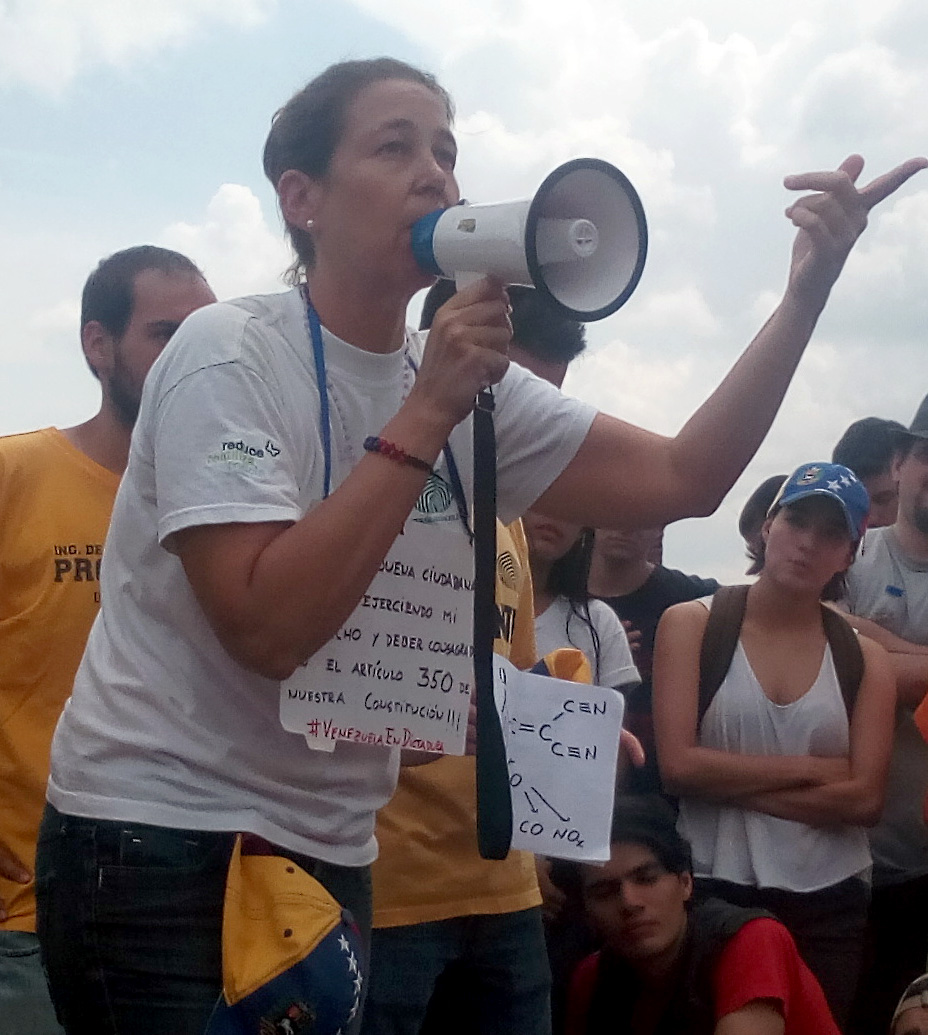
- Kräuter giving a lecture about tear gas during a sit in, in Caracas, 2017
- Born: 18 September 1967 (age 58)
- Education: Simón Bolívar University
- Known for: Study of tear gas during the Venezuelan protests
- Scientific career
- Fields: Chemistry

Mónica Kräuter (born 18 September 1967) is a Venezuelan chemist and professor of the Simón Bolívar University. She gained notability during the 2017 Venezuelan protests due to her study of tear gas canisters and her advice on how to protect against its effects.

== Career ==
Mónica Kräuter graduated as a chemist from Simón Bolívar University in 1993, and she obtained a master's degree in chemistry with an environment specialty in 2000 at Simón Bolívar University as well. She has been a professor of the university in the systems and processes department since her graduation.

She carried out a study that involved the collection of thousands of tear gas canisters fired by Venezuelan authorities in 2014. She stated that the majority of canisters used the main component CS gas, supplied by Cóndor of Brazil, which meets Geneva Convention requirements, but that 72% of the tear gas used was expired and other canisters produced in Venezuela by Cavim did not show adequate labels or expiration dates. Following the expiration of tear gas, she notes that it "breaks down into cyanide oxide, phosgenes and nitrogens that are extremely dangerous". Kräuter has advised against the use of vinegar to neutralize the effects of tear gas since it is an acid, instead recommending the use of sodium bicarbonate or antacids such as Maalox.

In 2018 she was listed by Americas Quarterly as one of the 10 People Who Will (One Day) Rebuild Venezuela.

== See also ==
- Tear gas
- 2017 Venezuelan protests
- 2014 Venezuelan protests
