= Susan Jane Walp =

American painter

- Born: September 7, 1948 (age 77); Allentown, Pennsylvania, U.S.
- Education: Mount Holyoke College; New York Studio School
- Known for: Still life painting
- Spouse: Michael Moore (1941-2014)
- Awards: Guggenheim Fellowship; American Academy of Arts and Letters; National Endowment for the Arts; National Academy of Design
- Website: Susan Jane Walp

Susan Jane Walp (born September 7, 1948) is an American artist known for small, contemplative still life paintings. Critics describe her work as meditations on time, memory and mortality, celebrations of the complexities of seeing, and homages to the dignity of natural and humble objects. Stephen Westfall commented, "the care and precision of her painting decisions are felt as a kind of spiritual penetration into the everyday and into the realm of awareness in art wherein the living speak with the dead or the otherwise absent."

Susan Jane Walp, Melon Sliced Open on a Black Plate with Knife, oil on linen, 10.375" x 10.125", 2015.

== Early life and education ==
Walp was born in Allentown, Pennsylvania, on September 7, 1948. She studied art at Mount Holyoke College (BA, 1970) and a Boston University summer program, where she first worked with painter Lennart Anderson, a longtime mentor and friend, who taught her a painting approach grounded in tonal relationships. She undertook further studies at the New York Studio School, with Nicholas Carone, the Skowhegan School, and the Brooklyn College MFA program.

== Career ==
Walp has exhibited in solo shows at galleries including Fischbach and Tibor de Nagy in New York City, Pamela Salisbury in Hudson, New York, Hackett Freedman in San Francisco, and Victoria Munroe in New York City and Boston. Her work has also appeared at the American Academy, Denver Art Museum, Jaffe-Friede Gallery of Dartmouth College, Naples Museum of Art and National Academy Museum, among other venues. She is based in Vermont.

=== Work and reception ===
Critics link Walp's work to historical traditions such as American pragmatism and its emphasis on discipline, attention and craft, Roman frescoes and Northern European renaissance still lifes. Modern touchstones include the compositional order of Cézanne and the early Cubism of Braque and Juan Gris, Giorgio Morandi, and 20th-century American painters such as Charles Webster Hawthorne and Edwin Dickinson, who combined penetrating observation with an atmospheric, sometimes abstract, sense of space. New York Times critic Ken Johnson wrote, "Walp is a modernist … She knows how to make paint do double duty in the service of both a cannily abbreviated illusionism and a delicate abstraction of paper-thin planes … how to let painterly gesture embody a sensual urgency that the imagery demurely guards."

Walp typically works at a limited size in muted colors and in a square format more associated with abstraction. Her iconography is enigmatic, consisting of arrangements of objects without functional relationships to one another. Her compositions frequently employ a complex geometry of secondary shapes and objects revolving around a central, often circular, element. She sometimes compresses space in way that equalizes meticulously detailed objects and minimal, rougher backgrounds, creating a tension between intimate naturalism and artifice (e.g., Melon Sliced Open on a Black Plate with Knife, 2015). Art in America critic Eric Sutphin remarked, "The modesty of Walp’s work is deceptive: her paintings demand the viewer’s complete attention in order to reveal their nuances … [they] reward those who take the time to look at them closely and deeply, their quiet stillness offering a moment of contemplative sanctuary."

=== Recognition ===
Walp was awarded fellowships from the Guggenheim Foundation (2006), Bogliasco Center (2007), New York Creative Arts Public Service Program (1978) and National Endowment for the Arts (1977). She received awards and grants from the American Academy of Arts and Letters (2009, 2021) and National Academy of Design (2006, 2009). In 2017, she was the artist-in-residence at Dartmouth College.

Walp's art is held in the public collections of the Hood Museum of Art, National Academy Museum and Sheldon Museum of Art, among others.
