= University of the Andes (Venezuela) =

Public university in Venezuela

Coordinates: 8°37′06″N 71°08′22″W

- Universidad de Los Andes
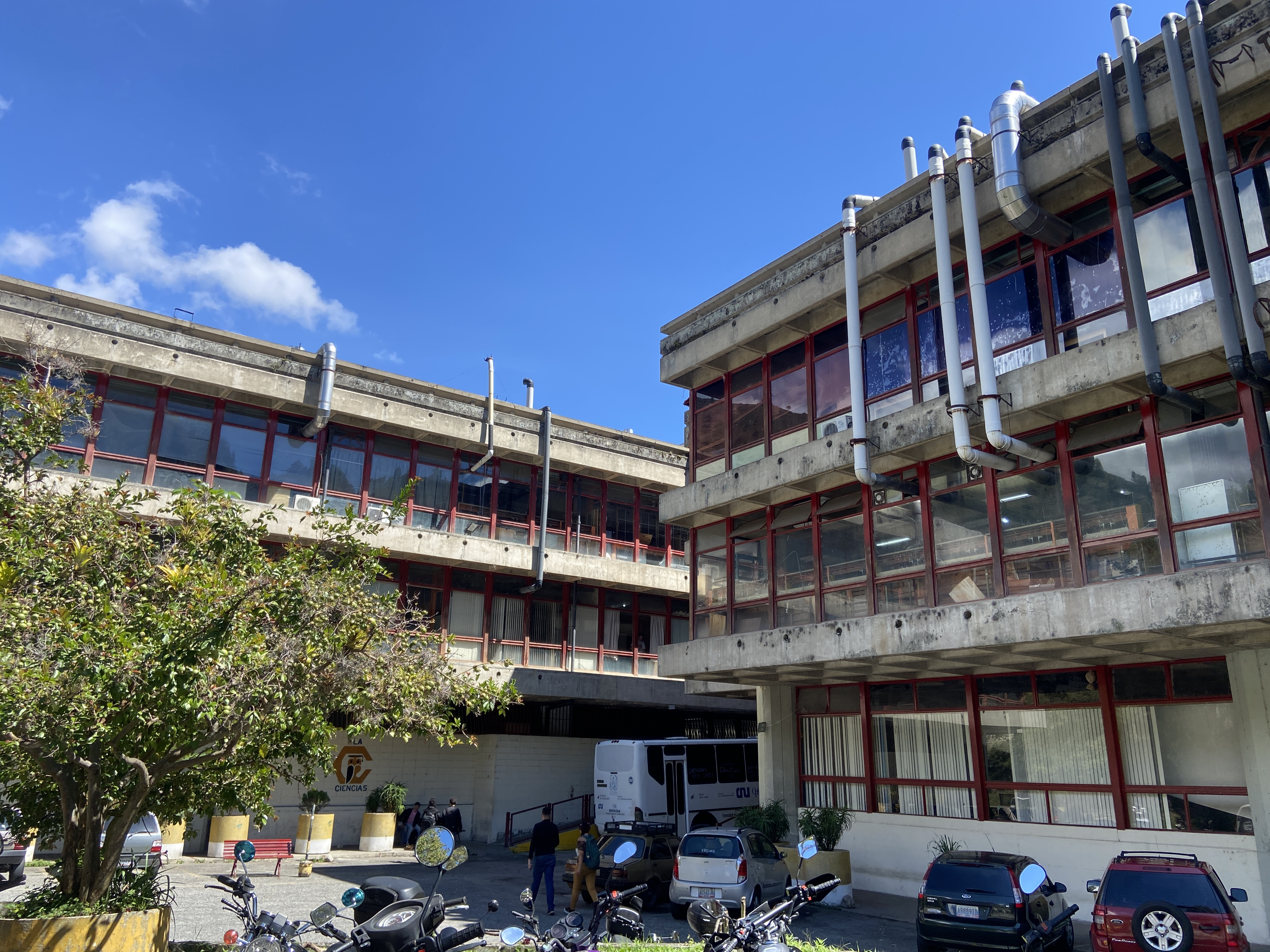
- University of the Andes Faculty of Natural Sciences
- Motto: Initium Sapientiae timor domini ('The beginning of wisdom is the fear of the Lord.')
- Type: Public
- Established: 1810; 216 years ago (Real Universidad de San Buenaventura de Mérida de los Caballeros)
- Rector: Mario Bonucci Rossini
- Students: 54,000 students (2006)
- Location: Mérida, Táchira and Trujillo, Venezuela
- Colors: Blue and White
- Website: www.ula.ve www.saber.ula.ve

The University of the Andes (Spanish: Universidad de Los Andes, ULA) is the second-oldest university in Venezuela, whose main campus is located in the city of Mérida, Venezuela. ULA is the largest public university in the Venezuelan Andes, having one of the largest student bodies in the country.

== History ==
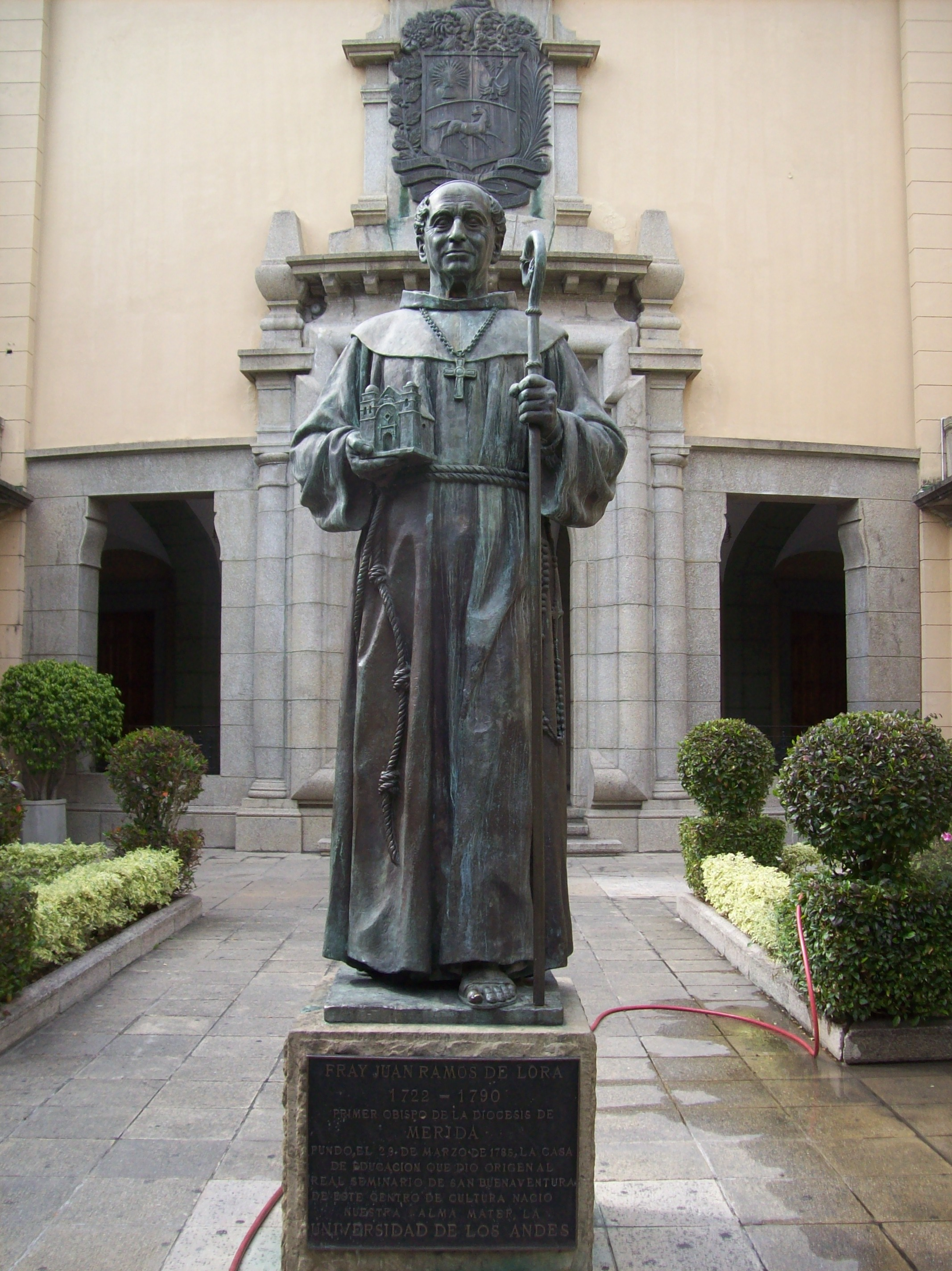
Fray Juan Ramos de Lora, Founder of University of the Andes.

ULA was initially established as a Catholic seminary on March 29, 1785 by the Bishop of Mérida, Friar Juan Ramos de Lora. De Lora called the newly founded house of studies "Real Colegio Seminario de San Buenaventura de Mérida", or Royal Seminary College of San Buenaventura of Mérida. The school was elevated to the status of Royal University of San Buenaventura of Mérida de los Caballeros on September 21, 1810, entitling it to confer junior and senior degrees in Philosophy, Medicine, Civil and Canonical (Catholic) Law, and Theology. Universidad de Los Andes maintained its affiliation with the Catholic Church until 1832, when the president of Venezuela, General José Antonio Páez, passed an act making it a secular institution.

Currently, Universidad de Los Andes operates two campuses in Mérida, with about a dozen faculties spread throughout the city, as well as two satellite campuses in the other Venezuelan Andean states of Tachira and Trujillo.

== Academics ==
Universidad de Los Andes offers undergraduate programs in the arts, sciences, literature, and humanities, long and short programs, as well as courses, degrees, post-graduate professional, magisterial and doctoral programs, specializations, diplomas, etc.

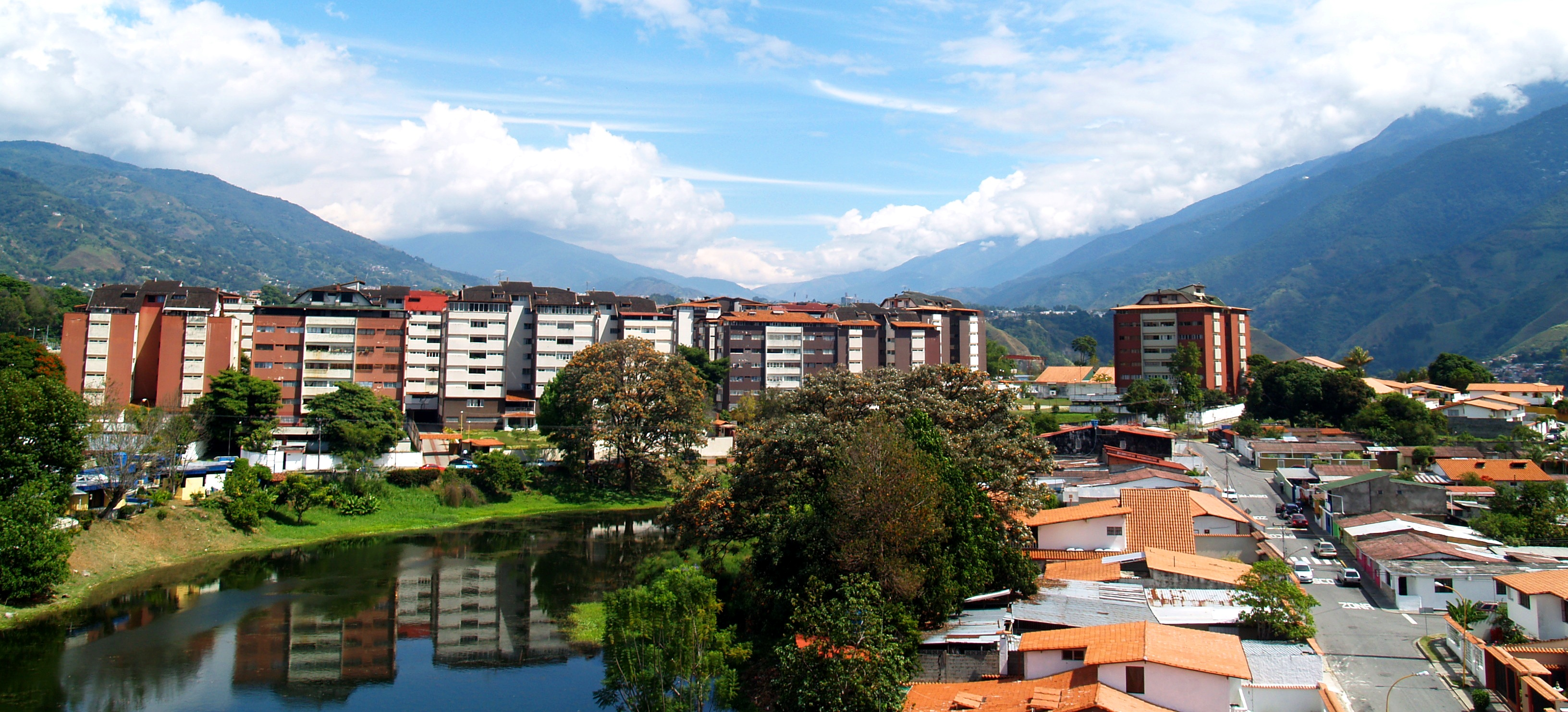
City of Mérida.

=== Academic units ===
Faculty of Architecture and Design

- School of Architecture
- School of Industrial Design

Faculty of Arts

- School of Performing Arts
- School of Visual Arts and Graphic Design
- School of Music

Faculty of Science

- School of Physics
- School of Mathematics
- School of Biology
- School of Chemistry

Faculty of Economic and Social Sciences

- School of Business Administration
- School of Accounting
- School of Economics
- School of Statistics

Faculty of Forestry and Environmental Science

- School of Forestry
- School of Geography and Renewable Resources
- School of Forestry Engineering

Faculty of Judicial and Political Sciences

- School of Political Sciences
- School of Criminology
- School of Law

Faculty de Pharmacy and Bioanalysis

- School of Bioanalysis
- School of Pharmacy

Faculty of Humanities and Education

- School of Education
- School of History
- School of Modern Languages
- School of Letters
- School of Media

Faculty of Engineering

- General Engineering School
- School of Civil Engineering
- School of Electrical Engineering
- School of Geological Engineering
- School of Mechanic Engineering
- School of Chemical Engineering
- School of Systems Engineering

Faculty of Medicine

- School of Nursing
- School of Medicine
- School of Nutrition

Faculty of Dentistry

- School of Dentistry

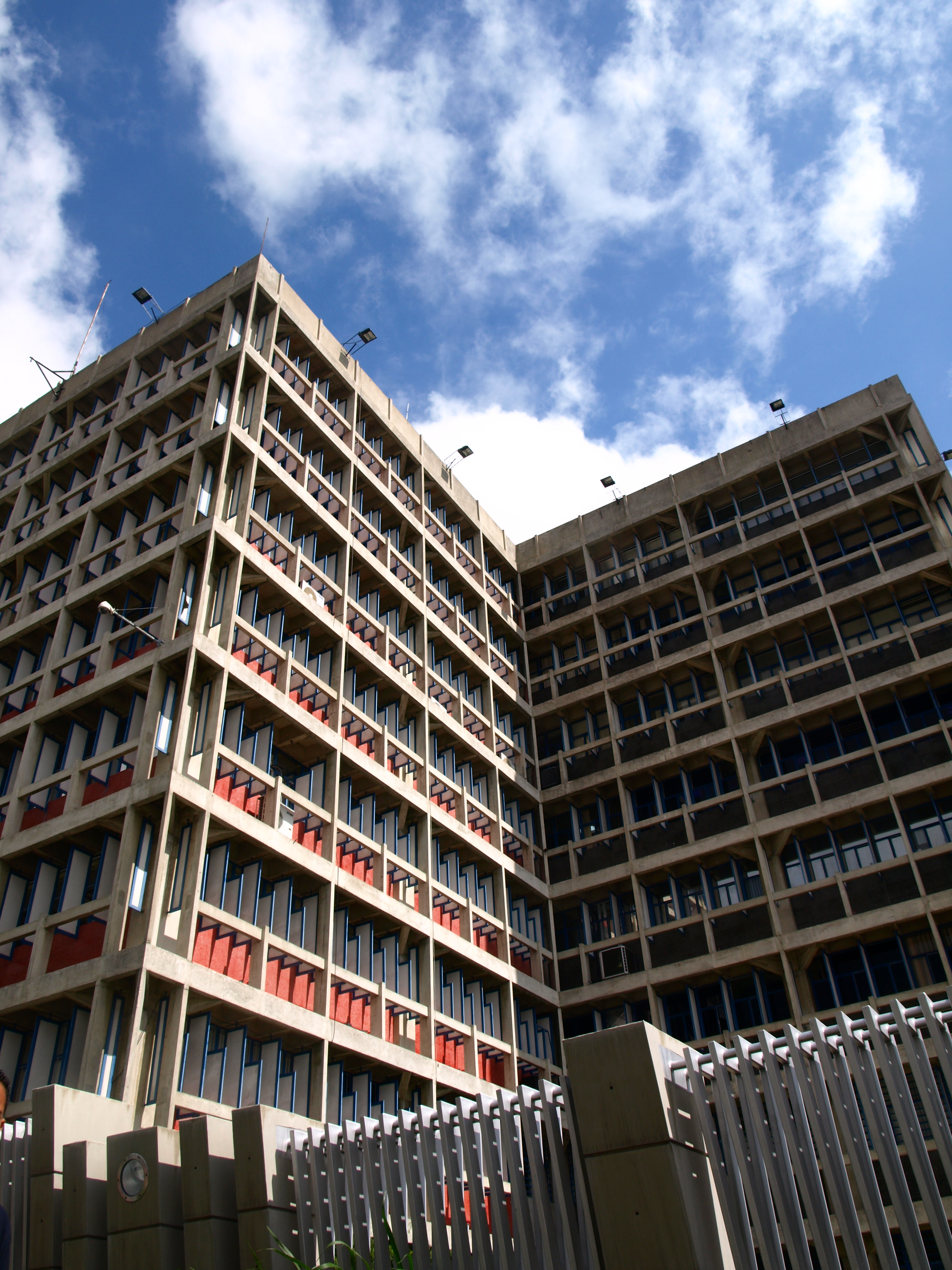
Faculty of Economic and Social Sciences at Universidad de Los Andes.

=== Admission ===
Admission to ULA is very competitive and generally mediated through the Venezuelan Oficina de Planeacion del Sector Universitario (OPSU - Office for Higher Education Planning), which oversees grades and standardized tests for all Venezuelan students enrolled in secondary education institutions. ULA lists some of the highest high school academic index (Indice Academico de la OPSU) requirements in Venezuela.

== Research ==
ULA is one of the universities most actively engaged in research in Venezuela, consistently ranking among the top two or three universities in Venezuela across all disciplines. In 2009, ULA was ranked 37th out of the 437 Latin American universities and research institutes evaluated by the Ranking Iberoamericano de Instituciones de Investigacion.

Active graduate research groups include: Kinetics & Catalysis, Polymer Chemistry, Behavioral Physiology, Biotechnology, Enzimology, Parasitology, Cytology, Pharmacology, Toxicology, Analytical and Molecular Spectroscopy, Geophysics, Astrophysics, Condensed Matter Physics, Applied and Theoretical Physics, Magnetism of Solids, Urban Environmental Quality, Finance, Entrepreneurial Development, Agricultural Management, Criminology, Comparative Politics, Environmental Geopolitics, International Politics, Ethnography, Linguistics, Semiolinguistics, Phonetics, Gender Studies, Latin American Arts and Literature, Medieval Studies, etc.

== Athletic and cultural activities ==
ULA also houses numerous varsity athletic teams, including chess, soccer, fencing, rhythmic gymnastics, tennis, basketball, swimming, and track and field and performing arts companies such as Ballet Estable de la ULA, Teatro (Theater) Estable de la ULA, Coral (Choir) Universitaria and Orfeon Universitario. However, ULA's athletic dominance has declined in the past decade.

The Orfeon Universitario Choir has toured Colombia, Spain, the Netherlands, France, and Germany. ULA also hosts annual ballet seasons, a chamber orchestra season and numerous theater and music festivals (classical, traditional music, jazz, chant, Christmas) open to the community.

ULA operates a local radio station, 107.7 ULA FM. It formerly operated ULA TV channel 22 before it was ordered closed in June 2017.

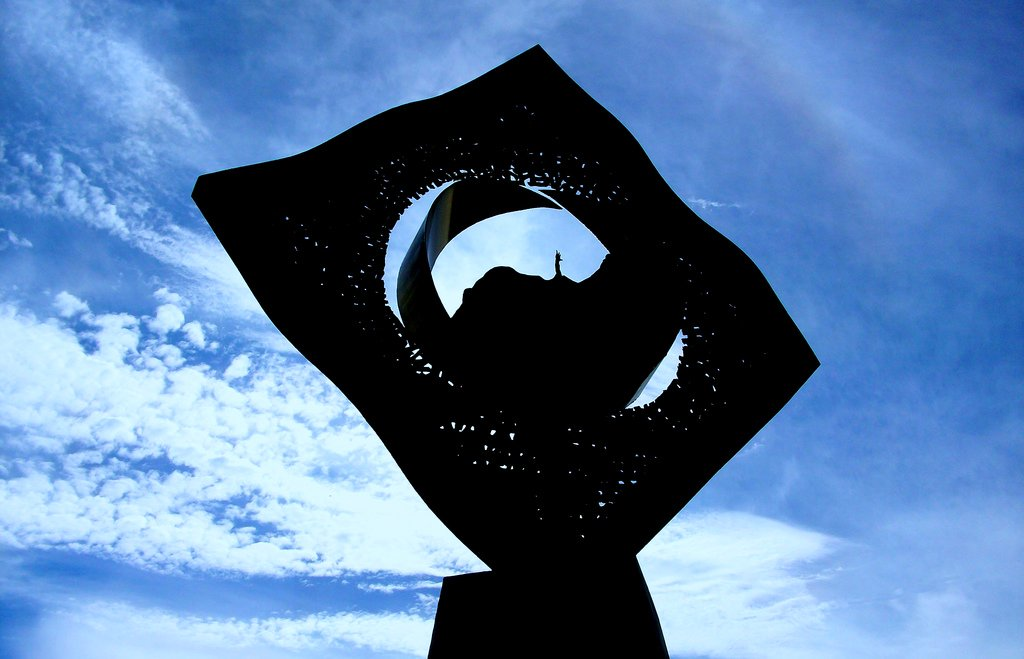
Famous sculpture at Universidad de Los Andes

== Rectors or University Authorities ==
- Friar Juan Ramos De Lora (1782–1790)
- Luis Dionisio Villamizar (1790–1791)
- Fray Manuel Cándido De Torrijos (1791–1792)
- Hipólito De Elías González (1792–1794)
- Francisco Javier Irastorza (1794–1795)
- Juan H. Hurtado De Mendoza (1795–1802)
- Francisco Javier Irastorza (1802–1803)
- Ramón Ignacio Méndez (1806–1810)
- Buenaventura Arias (1810–1815)
- Rafael Lasso De La Vega (1815–1822)
- José De La Cruz Olivares (1822–1826)
- Esteban Arias (1826–1830)
- Ignacio Fernández Peña (1832–1834)
- Sulpicio Frías (1834–1836)
- Rafael Alvarado (1836–1838)
- Agustín Chipía (1838–1843)
- Eloy Paredes (1843)
- Rafael Alvarado (1843–1845)
- José Francisco Más y Rubí (1843–1852)
- Eloy Paredes (1852–1855)
- Ciriaco Piñeyro (1855–1858)
- Pedro Juan Arellano (1858–1862)
- Francisco Jugo (1862–1863)
- Caracciolo Parra y Olmedo (1863–1866)
- José Francisco Más y Rubí (1866–1869)
- Pedro Monsalve (1869–1872)
- Foción Febres-Cordero (1872–1875)
- José De Jesús Dávila (1875–1881)
- Gabriel Picón Febres (1881–1884)
- Pedro De Jesús Godoy (1884–1886)
- Domingo Hernández Bello (1886–1887)
- Caracciolo Parra y Olmedo (1887–1900)
- Pedro De Jesús Godoy (1900–1901)
- Asisclo Bustamante (1901)
- Nepomuceno Pagés Monsant (1902–1909)
- Ramón Parra Picón (1909–1917)
- Diego Carbonell (1917–1921)
- Gonzalo Bernal (1921–1931)
- Humberto Ruiz Fonseca (1932–1933)
- Cristóbal Beníte (1933–1934)
- Roberto Picón Lares (1934–1936)
- Víctor Manuel Pérez Perozo (1936–1937)
- Manuel Antonio Pulido Méndez (1937–1941)
- Gabriel Picón Febres (Hijo) (1941–1942)
- Humberto Ruiz Fonseca (1942–1944)
- Pedro Pineda León (1944–1945)
- Edgar Loynaz Páez (1945–1949)
- Eloy Dávila Celis (1949–1951)
- Renato Esteva Ríos (1951–1953)
- Joaquín Mármol Luzardo (1953–1958)
- Pedro Rincón Gutiérrez (1958–1972)
- Ramón Vicente Casanova (1972–1976)
- Pedro Rincón Gutiérrez (1976–1980)
- José Mendoza Angulo (1980–1984)
- Pedro Rincón Gutiérrez (1984–1988)
- Néstor López Rodríguez (1988–1992)
- Miguel Rodríguez Villenave (1992–1996)
- Felipe Pachano Rivera (1996–2000)
- Genry Vargas (2000–2004)
- Léster Rodríguez Herrera (2004–2008)
- Mario Bonucci Rossini (2008–)

== Notable alumni ==
- Marisol Aguilera, biologist

== Notable faculty ==
- Jacqueline Clarac de Briceño (1932–2023), anthropologist

== See also ==
- List of colonial universities in Latin America
- University of the Andes Library Services
