= Sergio Arias Cazorla =

Venezuelan human geneticist

- Born: Sergio Arias Cazorla; June 10, 1933; Caracas, Venezuela
- Died: February 17, 2025 (aged 91); San Antonio de Los Altos, Venezuela
- Other name: Arias et al.
- Occupation: Human geneticist
- Years active: 1952–present
- Known for: Founding the Human Genetics laboratory in the Venezuelan Institute for Scientific Research and discovering IVIC syndrome (also known as Instituto Venezolano de Investigaciónes Científicas syndrome)
- Notable work: Founding the Human Genetics laboratory in the Venezuelan Institute for Scientific Research.

Sergio Arias Cazorla (born 1933) is a human geneticist who worked as a geneticist in the Venezuelan Institute for Scientific Research (Spanish: Instituto Venezolano de Investigaciónes Científicas).

== Career ==
He first started studying medicine at the Central University of Venezuela, in Caracas, from 1952 to 1959, then did postgraduate studies in internal medicine from 1959 to 1961. He worked as a zoology professor from 1952 to 1953 at the Escuela de Capacitación Forestal de El Junquito (English: Forest Capacitation School El Junquito), then from 1964 to 1966 he became a fellow in medical genetics at the Johns Hopkins University in Baltimore, United States, then in June 1969 he founded the Human Genetics laboratory, at the Venezuelan Institute for Scientific Research, which he created to do research on hereditary/genetic disorders that are present in Venezuela, then from 1970 to 1975 he worked as a biology professor at the Universidad Simón Bolívar (English: Simón Bolívar University), and finally from 1975 to 1996 he worked as a human genetics professor at the Venezuelan Institute for Scientific Research, where he documented the first case of and consequently discovered Instituto Venezolano de Investigaciónes Científicas syndrome, or IVIC syndrome for short.
