= María Gloria Domínguez-Bello =

American microbial ecologist

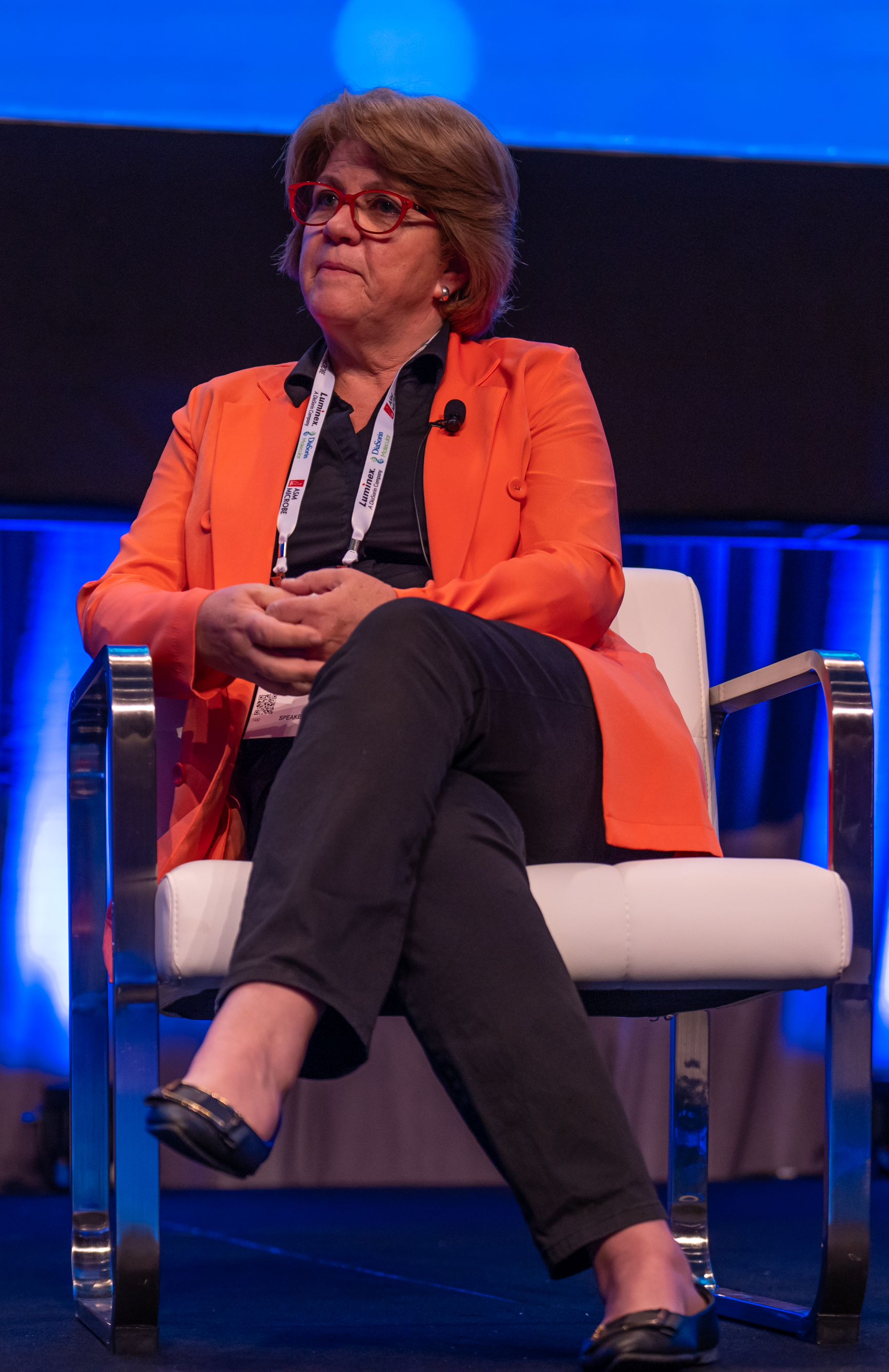
- Microbiologist María Gloria Domínguez-Bello at the 2022 American Society for Microbiology Microbe annual meeting
- Born: December 3, 1959 (age 66); Caracas, Venezuela
- Education: Simón Bolívar University; Aberdeen University
- Spouses: Luis Raul Pericchi; Martin J. Blaser
- Children: Adriana Pericchi Domínguez
- Scientific career
- Workplaces: Venezuelan Institute of Scientific Research; University of Puerto Rico; New York University; Rutgers University
- Thesis: Microbial ecophysiology in the rumen of sheep fed tropical forages (1989)
- Website: https://sites.rutgers.edu/mgdblab/

María Gloria Domínguez-Bello (born December 3, 1959) is a Venezuelan-American microbial ecologist that has worked on adaptations of gut fermentation organs in animals, gastric colonization by bacteria, assembly of the microbiota in early life, effect of practices that reduce microbiota transmission and colonization in humans, and effect of urbanization. She is the Henry Rutgers Professor of Microbiome and Health at Rutgers University, New Brunswick. Her lab collaborates in multidisciplinary science, integrating microbiology, immunology, pediatrics, nutrition, anthropology, environmental engineering and architecture/urban studies, and microbial ecology.

== Education and career ==
María Gloria Domínguez-Bello was born in Caracas, Venezuela on 3 December 1959. She went to University Simon Bolivar, where she received her B.S. in Biology in 1983. Domínguez-Bello then attended the University of Aberdeen in Scotland, where she received a Masters degree in nutrition in 1987, followed by a Ph.D. in microbiology in 1990. Her thesis was entitled, "Microbial ecophysiology in the rumen of sheep fed tropical forages." She held two postdoctoral training positions, the first at INRA-Theix in France and the second at Centro de Biología Molecular Severo Ochoa at the Universidad Autonoma of Madrid, Spain. She worked at the Venezuelan Institute of Scientific Research until 2002. She worked at the University of Puerto Rico in San Juan from 2002 to 2012, at New York University from 2012 to 2017, and is currently a professor at Rutgers, The State University of New Jersey, and a leading member of Rutgers University Microbiome Program (RUMP).

== Research and service ==
Domínguez-Bello first proposed the idea of restoring the microbiota in C-section born neonates -void of the natural maternal birth canal microbes. She ran the first observational trial and is now involved in a randomized clinical trial to determine effects of restoring natural microbes at birth, on the baby health. She pioneered work showing the loss of human microbiome diversity and change of environmental home microbial exposures associated with urbanization and initiated the efforts to preserve the global human microbiome diversity in the Microbiota Vault, a repository for the future health of humanity.

She became a fellow of the Infectious Diseases Society of America (IDSA) in 2008 and a member of the American Academy of Microbiology in 2013. In 2015 she received the Arturo L. Carrión Muñoz|Arturo Carrion Award from the Puerto Rico Society of Microbiology and became member of the Academy of Sciences of Latin America (ACAL). In 2019 she became fellow of the Canadian Institute for Advanced Research (CIFAR) program in Humans & the Microbiome.

An advocate for using technology that respects nature, she also has promoted since 2019 the creation of Baby Friendly Spaces (BFS) at work, as a way to improve maternal and infant health, with direct breastfeeding by working mothers, and is a member of the NJ Breastfeeding Coalition.

== Personal life ==
Domínguez-Bello was married to Luis Raul Pericchi, with whom she had one child, Adriana Pericchi Domínguez. She married fellow microbiome researcher Martin J. Blaser in 2013.
