= Francisco Zaera =

Venezuelan-American chemist

Francisco Zaera is a Venezuelan-American chemist, currently a distinguished professor at University of California, Riverside and an Elected Fellow of the American Association for the Advancement of Science, the American Chemical Society and the American Vacuum Society.

Zaera obtained his BS degree from the Simón Bolívar University in Caracas, Venezuela in 1979. He then got his Ph.D. from the University of California, Berkeley in 1984 and until 1986 served as a postdoc at Brookhaven National Laboratory.
