= María Domínguez Castellano =

Spanish scientist and neuroscientist

María Domínguez Castellano (born 1965, Alcántara, Spain) is a Spanish neuroscientist. She serves as the director of the Department of Developmental Neurobiology at the Institute of Neurosciences in Alicante, Spain, a joint institution of Miguel Hernández University of Elche (UMH) and Spanish National Research Council (CSIC).

== Biography ==
She has a B.S. in biochemistry from the University of Seville and a Ph.D. in developmental biology from the Autonomous University of Madrid. Her doctoral thesis title was "Función del gen asense del complejo génico achaete-scute en la generación de los órganos sensoriales de Drosophila melanogaster" ("Role of the asense gene of the achaete-scute gene complex in the generation of the sensory organs of Drosophila melanogaster "). She worked at University of Zurich and the University of Cambridge before taking up a post at the Institute of Neurosciences (UMH-CSIC) in 2000. She became a full professor in 2008, and Director of the Department of Developmental Neurobiology in 2016.

In 2008 she won the Alberto Sols prize, with the jury citing "the study of the development and formation of the retina as a neural model, a study that in turn has revealed new mechanisms of cancer development" and the Francisco Cobos prize for Biomedical Research.

Since 2007, she has been a member of the European Molecular Biology Organization (EMBO). She is a member of Asociación de Mujeres Investigadoras y Tecnólogas (AMIT), the Association of Women Researchers and Technologists.

== Selected publications ==
- Gutierrez-Perez, I., Jordan-Rowley, J., Lyu, X., Valadez-Graham, V., Vallejo, D.M., Ballesta-Illan, E., Lopez-Atalaya, J.P., Kremsky, I., Caparros, E., Corce, V.G., Dominguez, M " Ecdysone-Induced 3D Chromatin Reorganization Involves Active Enhancers Bound by Pipsqueak and Polycomb. " Cell Rep . 28(10), 2715 - 2727.e5 (2019)
- Reiff, T., Antonello, Z.A., Ballesta-Illán, E., Mira, L., Sala, S., Navarro, M., Martinez, L.M., Dominguez, M " Notch and EGFR regulate apoptosis in progenitor cells to ensure gut homeostasis in Drosophila. " EMBO J . 4, 38(21) - e101346 (2019)
- Villegas, S.N, Gombos, R., García-López, L., Gutiérrez-Pérez, I., García-Castillo, J., Vallejo, D.M., Da Ros, V., Ballesta-Illán, E., Mihály, J., Dominguez, M. " PI3K/Akt Cooperates with Oncogenic Notch by Inducing Nitric Oxide-Dependent Inflammation. " Cell Rep . 22(10), 2541 - 2549 (2018)
- Vallejo DM., Juarez-Carreño S., Bolivar J., Morante J., Dominguez M. " A brain circuit that synchronizes growth and maturation revealed through Dilp8 binding to Lgr3. " Science . 350(6262), - aac6767 (2015)
- Garelli, A, Gontijo, A,, Miguela, V,, Caparros, E,, Dominguez, M " Imaginal discs secrete insulin-like peptide 8 to mediate plasticity of growth and maturation time. " Science . 336(6081), 579 - 582 (2012)
