= Fernando Báez =

Fernando Báez may refer to:

- Fernando Báez (writer), Venezuelan writer, poet and essayist
- Fernando Báez (weightlifter) (born 1941), Puerto Rican weightlifter
- Fernando Báez (2001–2020), Argentine citizen murdered in Buenos Aires Province
