= Luis Razetti =

Venezuelan surgeon (1862–1932)

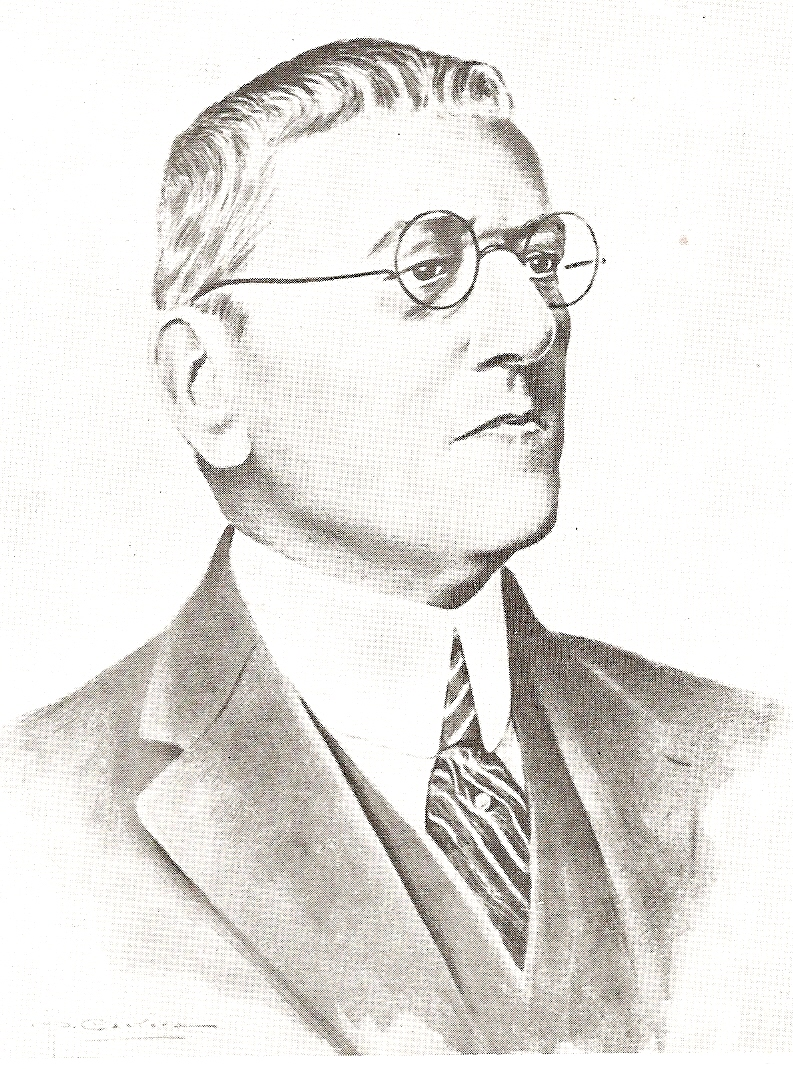
- Doctor Luis Razetti
- Born: September 10, 1862; Caracas, Venezuela
- Died: May 14, 1932 (69); Caracas, Venezuela
- Citizenship: Venezuela Venezuelan
- Known for: Being one of the most important figures in Venezuelan medical history, advancing medicine in the country.
- Scientific career
- Fields: Medicine

Luis Razetti (Caracas, Venezuela, September 10, 1862 - May 14, 1932) was a surgeon, who supported and managed a number of advances in the progress of Venezuelan medicine. He gained his Doctorate in Medicine from the Central University of Venezuela, is considered the driving-force in the "Renaissance of the Venezuelan medicine", concerning education, research centers and medical practices in Venezuela. One of the two schools of Medicine of the Central University of Venezuela bears his name. Together with Dr. José María Vargas and Dr. José Gregorio Hernández (who is also best remembered for his great religious vocation), Dr. Luis Razetti stands out among the most valuable figures in Venezuelan medicine. His remains rest in the National Pantheon of Venezuela in Caracas since June 23, 1982.

== Biography ==
Luis Razetti was born in Caracas, Venezuela, on September 10, 1862. He was baptized in the cathedral church with the name of Luis María Francisco Nicolás de Jesús. He was the son of Don Luigi Razetti, a merchant of Genoa, Italy and Doña Emeteria Martinez Sanz, who was the granddaughter of Lic. Miguel José Sanz, tutor of the Liberator Simón Bolívar. Besides Luis, who was the eldest son, Razetti and Martinez Sanz had two sons, Enrique and Ricardo. Luis' brothers were engineers, however Enrique died very young in 1892 and Ricardo lived until 1932. At a young age, the father in their family travelled to Italy and never returned to Venezuela, meaning Doña Emeteria was responsible for the care and education of their children. It is said that once, Luis Razetti wrote All I am I owe to her.

He attended the Escuela Niño Jesús for primary school, then completed his baccalaureate at the Central University of Venezuela, where he obtained the degree of Bachelor of Philosophy (July 13, 1878). At the same university, he immediately began his studies in medicine, obtaining the title of Doctor in Medicine and Surgery (August 4, 1884), a month before turning 22 years old. A few days later, he traveled to the countryside, where he spent his first years as a professional, particularly in the states Lara, Zulia and the Andes, back to Caracas after 5 years (1884-1889).

In 1890 he moved to Paris where he completed his postgraduate studies (1890-1893), specializing in surgery and Obstetrics. The influence of the French school, dominant then, made a deep and lasting impression on his mind, although he continued to draw on other sources, as is evident in his admiration for Santiago Ramón y Cajal, Charles Darwin, and Ernst Haeckel. He returned to Caracas in December 1892 to continue their professional practice, which served in his hometown, Caracas, until his death. In 1897 married Miss Luisa Amelia Díaz Guardia; however, Luis Razetti had no children.

Luis Razetti instrumental to progress in the field of Venezuelan medicine of his day, make important contributions, systematic and organized, so many of his followers and disciples of that time as well as contemporary physicians, attributed to be the driving force renaissance of the Venezuelan medicine. Luis Razetti was characterized as a multifaceted professional. Among his most notable contributions may mention, in chronological order as follows:

- The founding of the Society of Physicians and Surgeons of Caracas (1893).
- The establishment of clinical teaching in the Central University of Venezuela.
- The establishment of the contests of internship and externship hospitals (1895).
- The reform of the chairs of Anatomy and Operative Medicine (1895-1896).
- The founding of the College of Physicians of Venezuela (1902).
- The foundation of the National Academy of Medicine (1904), which was permanent secretary.
- The creation of the Venezuelan Congress of Medicine (1911).
- The foundation of the Anatomical Institute (1911).

As a surgeon, he shares with Dr. Pablo Acosta Ortiz the glory of being one of the founders of modern surgery in Venezuela. The hospital Vargas was the scene par excellence of surgical performance, supported by the head teacher of the Clinical Surgery chair. In his extensive operating statistics, several surgical procedures stand out as being performed for the first time in the country. Razetti also introduced a multitude of techniques and the use of surgical instruments. Among his surgical literature stands his book, Lecciones y notas de cirugía clínica (1917), and his work about appendicitis, typhus intestinal perforations, eclampsia and the Cesarean operation. In 1911, he was the founder of the first private clinic established in Caracas for the caring for the sick and performing high surgery. Her brother, Ricardo Razetti was the design engineer and builder of the clinic, which is known to this day as "Policlina Luis Razetti".

As a teacher, he devoted himself to teaching for more than half his life; imparting over sixteen years of teaching, he was the chair of the Anatomy Department and from 1914 until his death, Professor of Clinical Surgery. He also lectured in External Pathology and Operative Medicine and Obstetrics. In his grand scope of educational work and the outstanding number of disciples who were trained, he founded his own school in the Faculty of Medicine of the Universidad Central de Venezuela. In 1908, he served as rector of the Central University of Venezuela (he was vice rector in 1901) and in 1909, served as Senator by the state of Zulia. As medicine is a social function, he was an autodidactic hygienist in a time when the Ministry of Health and Welfare did not exist, conducting campaigns against alcoholism, tuberculosis, prostitution, Sexually transmitted diseases, infant mortality and cancer.

After General Juan Vicente Gómez's beloved son, Ali Gomez, died as one of the first victims of the Spanish flu pandemic, in 1918 Dr. Razetti created and presided over the Socorro Board of the Federal District. This board conducted a census of places where the epidemic was older, and he realized that poverty and lack of hygiene, in addition to malnutrition, contributed to the spread of the disease. They established hospitals in family homes, public places, on the corner of Castan, or on the corner of Maturin, which served as the Masonic lodge. Public gatherings and parties were banned, including that children stopped going to school and no masses were officiated in the churches. The bodies were counted by the hundreds, and the Southern General Cemetery was ordered to build numerous individual graves and a large common grave for the victims of the epidemic. Today that place is called "La Peste." Hospitals became morgues, especially the Caracas Vargas Hospital. Since early 1919, thanks to sanitary measures imposed by Razetti, the flu was kept in check and was reducing its virulence. This tragic episode demonstrated that Venezuela was not prepared for an epidemic of this magnitude, and that malnutrition and poverty are factors that contribute to the spread of the disease.

In 1924, he issued a report on excessive infant mortality that cost him nearly a year exile in Curaçao. Moreover, as a biologist, Luis Razetti disclosed essential tasks, since, together with Vicente Marcano, David Lobo, Elías Toro and Guillermo Delgado Palacios, he was part of the first waves of biological positivism in Venezuela. In 1904, he held an intense debate about the legitimacy of the doctrine of descent, which sparked backlash from some members of the scientific community and especially Dr. José Gregorio Hernández. La Doctrina de la Descendencia (The Doctrine of Descent, 1906) and ¿Que es la Vida? (What is Life?, 1907) are books he wrote as a result of this controversy. Perhaps he was, in that sense, the most controversial and edgy of Venezuelan doctors. His name is also synonymous with the Code of Medical Ethics, published in 1928, which had a continental impact. The Cancer Institute of Caracas was named in his honor. His publications, including Manual del antialcoholismo (The Temperance Crusade Manual) and Higiene social, La cruzada moderna (Social Health: The Modern Crusade, 1907), testify to his pioneering role.
