= Jacqueline Clarac de Briceño =

Venezuelan anthropologist of French origin (1932–2023)

Marie Henriette Jacqueline Clarac de Briceño (Guadeloupe, French Antilles, 24 July 1932 – Paris, France, 17 October 2023) was a Venezuelan anthropologist and researcher of French origin. She is recognized for her work defending Venezuelan indigenous communities and for promoting the institutionalization of anthropology in western Venezuela. Her research focused on the study of Andean peasant communities, indigenous peoples, and the epistemology of anthropological knowledge.

== Biography ==
She was born in Guadeloupe, French Antilles, on 24 July 1932, the daughter of Paule Erneste Marie Clarac Prat de Bastide and Marie Gabrielle Simone Yolande Noirtin Schemidt. She earned her baccalauréat in Martinique in 1950, and went on to study in Mexico, Paris, and Vienna before settling permanently in Venezuela.

In 1967, she obtained a degree in anthropology from the Central University of Venezuela, and later earned a doctorate in anthropology from the School for Advanced Studies in the Social Sciences in Paris in 1979, under the supervision of Maurice Godelier.

== Academic career ==
In 1967, she joined the Central University of Venezuela as teaching and research staff. She later requested a transfer to the University of Los Andes in Mérida, where she settled together with her husband, the philosopher José Manuel Briceño Guerrero. There she pioneered the study of health and illness from an anthropological perspective within the Department of Behavioral Sciences of the Faculty of Medicine.

She founded the Red de Antropologías del Sur (Network of Southern Anthropologies) at the University of Los Andes, and was instrumental in establishing anthropology as a discipline in western Venezuela.

In 1973, she established the Department of Anthropology and Sociology at the School of History, within the Faculty of Humanities and Education of the University of Los Andes, and that same year set up the Chair of Ethnology Applied to Psychiatry at the same institution. She went on to establish the Museo Arqueológico Gonzalo Rincón Gutiérrez of the University of Los Andes.

Over the following decades, she built out much of the institutional infrastructure for anthropology in the region: the Centro de Investigaciones Etnológicas (CIET, Center for Ethnological Research) and the Grupo de Investigaciones Antropológicas y Lingüísticas (GRIAL, Group for Anthropological and Linguistic Research); the graduate programs in the Master's in Ethnology, specializing in Ethnohistory (1997), and the Doctorate in Anthropology (2007); and two academic journals, Boletín Antropológico (1982) and In-SUR-Gentes (2019). Through the two graduate programs, she trained more than sixty students, and was credited with having built her own intellectual "school" within Venezuelan anthropology.

She was likewise behind the redefinition of the "Julio César Salas" Anthropological Museum, undertaken with the participation of the indigenous communities of Lagunillas, now known as the MucuJama Indigenous Historical Anthropological Museum. From 1993 she taught in the Master's program in Anthropology at the Faculty of Experimental Sciences of the University of Zulia, a program she had helped design.

She served as an advisor to the Indigenous Commission of the National Assembly of the Bolivarian Republic of Venezuela, to the National Assembly's Subcommittee on Culture, and to the Territorial Demarcation Program for Indigenous Groups of Mérida State.

== Death ==
She died in Paris on 17 October 2023, aged 91. Following her death, her ashes were brought to and interred in Mérida, the Venezuelan city where she spent most of her career, in a tribute organized by neighbors, colleagues, and former students.

== Legacy ==
She is considered one of the leading figures behind the "Southern Anthropologies" movement, an approach that calls for decolonizing the production of Latin American anthropological knowledge and which has since been the subject of academic analysis.

In interviews, Clarac de Briceño was critical of the "cultural area" framework long used in Venezuelan anthropology, arguing that it treated indigenous cultures as static and failed to account for their movement and exchange across the continent over time. She argued for an approach to anthropology that was plural rather than singular, consistent with her broader advocacy for the "Southern Anthropologies" movement.

== Works ==
Over the course of her career she published more than 30 books—12 of them as principal author, compiler, or editor, plus four works of children's literature with an ethnological and ethnohistorical perspective—and more than 80 articles in Venezuelan and foreign scientific journals.

Her most notable works include:

- La cultura campesina en los Andes venezolanos (1976; reissued 2014).
- Dioses en exilio: representaciones y prácticas simbólicas en la Cordillera de Mérida (1981; reissued 2003 and 2019).
- La persistencia de los dioses. Etnología cronológica de los Andes venezolanos (1985; reissued 2017).
- La enfermedad como lenguaje en Venezuela (1992; reissued 1996 and 2009).
- Historia, cultura y alienación en época de cambio y turbulencia social en Venezuela 2002-2003 (2004).
- El "lenguaje al revés": aproximación antropológica y etnopsiquiátrica al tema (2005).
- El águila y la Culebra (2nd ed., 2008).
- The collective work Dioses, musas y mujeres, in which she participated, received the UNESCO International Prize for the Best Book in Spanish.

In addition to her anthropological work, she published four works of children's literature promoting cultural diversity, including Había una vez una gran mancha blanca.

== Awards and honors ==
- 1988 – Golden Book Prize, awarded by the University of Los Andes, for the children's ethnological books Había una vez una gran mancha blanca and El águila y la culebra.
- 1995 – UNESCO International Prize for the Best Book in Spanish, shared with several other authors, for the book Diosas, musas y mujeres.
- National Humanities Prize.
- Honorary doctorate from the Universidad Nacional Experimental Francisco de Miranda.
