= Chibly Abouhamad Hobaica =

Venezuelan lawyer, teacher, and writer

Chibly Abouhamad Hobaica (1929–2005) was a lawyer, teacher and writer in Venezuela.

== Career ==
He was a professor at the Universidad Católica Andrés Bello and Universidad Central de Venezuela. His works and thoughts are a mainstay for the study of law in Venezuela. He was also the winner of the Academy of Political and Social Sciences awards in 1977 for his "New Approach to Family Law."

Chibly Abouhamad Hobaica died on November 23, 2005.
