= Federico Riu =

Venezuelan philosopher (1925–1985)

Federico Riu Farré
- Born: May 14, 1925; Lleida, Spain
- Died: December 9, 1985 (aged 60); Caracas, Venezuela
- Era: 20th century
- Region: Western Philosophy

Federico Riu Farré (May 14, 1925 – December 9, 1985) was a philosopher and university professor.

Riu was born in Lleida, Spain where he worked from an early age as a teacher in the small towns of his province. He emigrated to Venezuela in 1947 and became a Venezuelan citizen in 1954. In Caracas, Riu studied philosophy at the Central University of Venezuela and won a scholarship to study in Europe after receiving the highest grades in his class. He went to the University of Freiburg where he attended the lectures of Martin Heidegger and Eugen Fink. He taught philosophy at the Central University of Venezuela from 1956 to 1980 and became the Chair of the Department in two occasions and served also as Dean of the School of Humanities. Since 1987 a biannual prize in his honor rewards the best philosophical essay written in Venezuela.

== Works ==
- Ontología del siglo XX: Husserl, Hartmann, Heidegger y Sartre (Universidad Central de Venezuela: Caracas 1966).
- Historia y totalidad: el concepto de reificación en Lukács (Monte Ávila: Caracas 1968).
- Ensayos sobre Sartre (Monte Ávila: Caracas 1968).
- Tres fundamentaciones del marxismo (Monte Ávila: Caracas 1976). ISBN 978-980-01-1005-8
- Usos y abusos del concepto de alienación (Monte Ávila, Caracas 1981).
- Vida e historia de Ortega y Gasset (Monte Ávila: Caracas 1985). ISBN 978-980-01-0003-5
- Obras completas (Monte Ávila: Caracas 1997) ISBN 980-01-1005-4
