= Ezra Heymann =

South American professor

Ezra Heymann (1928 in Cernăuţi – 22 September 2014 in Barcelona) was a philosopher and university professor.

== Career ==
Born in the Austro-Hungarian Empire (currently Ukraine) to a German family of Jewish descent, during the 1940s his family avoided deportation to Transnistria while living in Czernowitz during his youth thanks to the protection of Traian Popovici. In 1946 Heymann began studies in Philosophy and Literature at the University of Bucharest, then to the University of Vienna and in 1947 to the University of Heidelberg where he completed his doctoral degree under Hans-Georg Gadamer. In 1953 he emigrated to Uruguay teaching at the Instituto de Profesores Artigas and at the University of the Republic until Juan María Bordaberry came into power. He was forced to leave the country after confronting local authorities regarding autonomy for the University. He then moved to Venezuela in 1974, teaching first at the Universidad Simón Bolívar and at the Central University of Venezuela until his retirement in 2006, although he kept his position as active professor for the rest of his life. His research focused on Kant and in classical German philosophy. His testimony as a Holocaust survivor was compiled in the book "Exilio a La Vida: Sobrevivientes Judíos De La Shoá".

== Works ==
- Decantaciones kantianas:Trece estudios críticos y una revisión de conjunto. UCV, Caracas, 1999. ISBN 9789800016022
- Los marcos doctrinales y la apertura fenomenológica: Vías de la exploración kantiana. Estudios de Filosofía, ISSN 0121-3628, Nº. 49, 2014, págs. 87-102.
- Analysis, Synthesis und Begriffsbestimmung. Zur Frage des Charakters der philosophischen Aussagen in der kantischen Theorie der Erfahrung und der Wissenschaft. In Valerio Hrsg V. Rohden, Ricardo Terra & Guido Almeida (eds.), Recht Und Frieden in der Philosophie Kants. ISBN 9783110210347.
- Las referencias internas y externas de la conciencia en la discusión fenomenológica. Apuntes Filosóficos 20 (2011), ISSN 1316-7553, Nº. 38, 2011 (Ejemplar dedicado a: Dossier Filosofía de la Mente), págs. 27-38
- La ética kantiana en una lectura de revisión. Episteme 28 (2008):171-180.
- La crítica de la visión moral del mundo. Ideas y valores: Revista Colombiana de Filosofía 133 (2007): 79–93.ISSN 0120-0062,
- Monismos y dualismos en Descartes y en Nietzsche. Cuaderno gris, ISSN 0213-6872, Nº. 5, 2001 (Ejemplar dedicado a: Nietzsche y la "gran política" : antídotos y venenos del pensamiento nietzscheano / coord. por Alfonso Moraleja), ISBN 84-932145-4-X, págs. 239-246
- Ética y axiología al terminar el siglo: Un balance. Enrahonar: Quaderns de filosofía, Nº 32–33, 2001, pp. 225–233. ISSN 0211-402X.
- Ética y axiología al terminar el siglo. Un balance. Enrahonar 32 (2001):225-233
- En torno a la imaginación en Kant. Apuntes Filosóficos 17 (2000).
- Ética y Estética. Apuntes Filosóficos 15 (1999).
- Filosofía trascendental mundaneizada. Ideas Y Valores 100 (1996):37-47.
- ¿ Crisis de la racionalidad científica?. Apuntes Filosóficos 5 (1994).
- El campo semántico del pensamiento. Descartes y Kant. Apuntes Filosóficos 6 (1994).
- ¿Cuál es la fundamentación kantiana de los derechos humanos?. Apuntes Filosóficos 1 (1992).
- La filosofía del conocimiento kantiana y tà protà katà physin. Cuadernos venezolanos de filosofía 13. Universidad Católica Andrés Bello, 1989. ISBN 9789800700372.
