= José Manuel Briceño Guerrero =

Venezuelan philosopher (1929–2014)

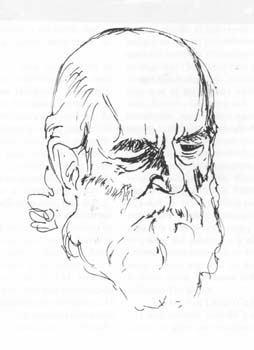
- Born: José Manuel Briceño Guerrero; 6 March 1929; Palmarito, Apure, Venezuela
- Died: 31 October 2014 (aged 85); Mérida, Venezuela
- Other name: Jonuel Brigue
- Spouse: Jacqueline Clarac de Briceño

Education
- Education: University of Vienna

Philosophical work
- Era: 20th-century philosophy
- Region: Western philosophy
- Website: https://www.jonuel-brigue.org/

José Manuel Briceño Guerrero (Palmarito, Apure, Venezuela, 6 March 1929 - Mérida, 31 October 2014) was a Venezuelan writer, philologist and philosopher. A large part of his work was published under the pen-name Jonuel Brigue. The Spanish philosopher Juan Nuño considered Briceño Guerrero "the most radically original of Latin American philosophers."

== Career ==
In 1951, Briceño Guerrero obtained a BA in Education in Caracas at the Instituto Pedagógico Nacional. In 1956, he obtained a Diploma in French Language and Culture at the Sorbonne in Paris. In 1961 he completed his PhD at the University of Vienna with a thesis on ethnopsychology entitled “The Socio-Psychological Foundations of Latin American Spanish.” While in Vienna he befriended Albin Lesky and Friedrich Kainz.

Upon his return to Venezuela, Briceño Guerrero worked for decades as Professor of Philosophy and Classical languages at the Universidad de Los Andes, Mérida. Three fruitful sabbatical years during his academic career would mark his future works. First, in 1968, when he was a visiting lecturer of Greek philology and philosophy at the Universidad Nacional Autónoma de México. During this stay in Mexico he familiarised himself with the ideas of Leopoldo Zea and Alfonso Caso. Then, in 1970, he was a visiting lecturer at Moscow State University. And third, in 1979, when he did studies on liberation theology at the Universidad de Granada, Spain.

In 1981, he was awarded the Venezuelan Premio Nacional de Ensayo, and in 1996, the Venezuelan National Prize for Literature. Considered one of the most influential and original Latin-American thinkers, some of his works have been translated into English, French and German, some as part of the UNESCO Collection of Representative Works.

== Works ==
- 1962: ¿Qué es la filosofía?, Mérida, Universidad de Los Andes. Free PDF
- 1965: Dóulos Oukóon, Caracas, Arte. Free PDF
- 1966: América Latina en el mundo, Caracas, Arte. Free PDF
- 1967: Triandáfila, Caracas, Arte. Free PDF
- 1970: El origen del lenguaje, Caracas, Monte Ávila. Free PDF
- 1977: La identificación americana con la Europa Segunda, Mérida, Universidad de Los Andes. See preface
- 1980: Discurso Salvaje, Caracas, Fundarte.
- 1981: Europa y América en el pensar mantuano, Caracas, Monte Ávila Editores.
- Geraldine Saldate, Mérida, Universidad de Los Andes: Talleres Gráficos Universitarios.
- 1983: Recuerdo y respeto para el héroe nacional (Speech delivered in representation of all Venezuelan universities upon the 200th anniversary celebrations of the birth of Simón Bolívar), Mérida, Universidad de Los Andes: Revista Azul. Free PDF
- 1984: Holadios, Caracas, Fundarte.
- 1987: Amor y terror de las palabras, Caracas, Mandorla. Free PDF
- 1990: El pequeño arquitecto del universo, Caracas, Alfadil. Free PDF
- 1992: Anfisbena. Culebra ciega, Caracas, Editorial Greca. Free PDF
- 1993: L’Enfance d’un Magicien (French translation of Amor y Terror de las Palabras by Nelly Lhermillier), Paris, Editions de L’Aube.
- 1994: Le discours sauvage (French translation of Discurso Salvaje by Nelly Lhermillier), Paris, Editions de L’Aube.
- El Laberinto de los Tres Minotauros, Caracas, Monte Ávila.
- 1996: “Les droits humains et les practiques de domination”, in: Qui sommes-nous, Paris, UNESCO.
- 1997: Diario de Saorge, Caracas, Fundación Polar.
- Discours des Lumières suivi de Discours des Seigneurs (French translation by Nelly Lhermillier), Paris, Editions de L’Aube – UNESCO.
- 1998: Esa Llanura Temblorosa, Caracas, Oscar Todtmann Editores. View partial PDF
- 2000: Matices de Matisse, Mérida, Universidad de Los Andes: Consejo de Publicaciones. View partial PDF
- 2001: Trece Trozos y Tres Trizas, Mérida, Ediciones Puerta del Sol. Free PDF
- 2002: El tesaracto y la tetractis, Caracas, Oscar Todtmann Editores.
- 2004: Mi casa de los dioses. Mérida, Ediciones del Vicerrectorado Académico, Universidad de Los Andes.
- 2004: Los recuerdos, los sueños y la razón. Mérida, Ediciones Puerta del Sol. Free PDF
- 2007: Para ti me cuento a China. Mérida, Venezuela: Ediciones Puerta del Sol, 2007.
- 2009: La Mirada Terrible. Mérida, Venezuela: Ediciones Puerta del Sol.
- 2010: Los chamanes de China. Mérida, Venezuela: Ediciones Puertas del Sol-Universidad Experimental de Yaracuy.
- 2011: Operación Noé. Mérida, Venezuela: Ediciones Puertas del Sol-Universidad Experimental de Yaracuy.
- 2011: El garrote y la máscara, Venezuela: Ediciones La Castalia.
- 2012: 3x1=4 (Retratos), Venezuela: Ediciones La Castalia.
- 2013: Dios es mi laberinto. Venezuela, Ediciones La Castalia.
- 2014: Cantos de mi Majano, Caracas: Fundación Editorial El perro y la rana.
- 2021: Love and terror of the words. English edition of "Amor y terror de las palabras" translation by Juan Acevedo: Ediciones Magnolia.

Other articles and minor works are referenced in the Spanish Wikipedia article.
