= Juan David García Bacca =

Spanish philosopher (1901–1992)

- Born: June 26, 1901; Pamplona, Spain
- Died: August 5, 1992 (aged 91); Quito, Ecuador

Philosophical work
- Era: 20th century
- Region: Western Philosophy

Juan David García Bacca was a Spanish-Venezuelan philosopher and university professor. He was born in Pamplona on June 26, 1901, and died on August 5, 1992, in Quito, Ecuador. Bacca began his education under the Claretians and was ordained as a priest in 1925. He continued his studies at the Ludwig-Maximilians-Universität München, the University of Zurich, and the University of Paris. However, during the 1930s, he left the Church and pursued philosophy at the University of Barcelona. In 1936 after criticizing Francisco Franco, Bacca was forced to live in exile. He first traveled to Ecuador where he taught at the Central University of Ecuador from 1939 to 1942. While in Ecuador, he became close friends with a writer named Alfredo Pareja Diezcanseco. He then went to Mexico where he taught at the National Autonomous University of Mexico (UNAM - Universidad Nacional Autónoma de México) from 1942 to 1946. He eventually established himself in Venezuela in 1946 and was granted citizenship in 1952. Bacca was a professor at the Central University of Venezuela until his retirement in 1971. He was recognized for his life's work and was awarded the National Prize for Literature in 1978.

== Biography ==
=== Early life and education ===
Juan David García Bacca was born on 26 June 1901, in Pamplona, Navarre. After the early death of his father, Juan Isidro García, a schoolteacher of Aragonese origin, he entered the Seminary of the Claretian Fathers at a young age. He completed his novitiate in Cervera in 1916-1917.

In Cervera, he studied philosophy and theology from 1917 to 1923 and was ordained a Claretian priest in 1925 after two years of moral and legal studies in Solsona.

His mother, Martina Bacca Benavides, gave birth to him and three other children. Bacca wrote,

My mother died […] in [1922]. […] The superiors did not allow me to go see her. […] And let it be said with the harsh truth, such news did not impress me as it should have been due to nature, due to humanity. Years and years had gone by without thinking about my mother.

During his stay at the seminary, he met the Hellenist Daniel Ruíz Bueno. He studied theology, philosophy, and science at various Central European universities, including Ludwig-Maximilians-Universität München, the University of Zurich, and the University of Paris. In Louvain, he studied Thomist philosophy.

=== Science and Irreverence ===
The thirties are characterized by a progressive separation from his ecclesiastical studies, a process exacerbated by the Civil War and exile. He graduated in philosophy from the University of Barcelona in 1934, reaching his doctorate a year later with the thesis Essay on the logical-genetic structure of the physical sciences. As a member of the Vienna Circle (1934-6) he taught mathematical logic and philosophy of science at the University of Barcelona between 1933 and 1937. In February 1936 he obtained the chair of Introduction to Philosophy at the University of Santiago de Compostela, but he did not exercise it since he had to leave Spain precipitously due to the start of the Civil War. In 1938 he left the priesthood after having lost his faith. It would have felt finite. He will then embark on a journey, propelled to a great extent by the well-received teachings of Christian theology, towards infinity. In that year, when the ecclesiastical authorities ordered him to return to Franco's Spain where he risked being tried and even shot because he had identified himself as a republican and was prohibited from publishing his writings, he decided to reveal himself. In his work Confessions: intimate and exterior autobiography he comments as follows:

One day [October 26], after lunch, at noon, I knelt down and asked the community for forgiveness for the bad examples I had given, while thanking them for their fraternal and generous hospitality. We all retired to take the usual Spanish siesta. I went up to my cell, took off my cassock, hung it in the closet; I dressed fully as a layman, took my suitcase, went downstairs; but instead of going through the goal, I went out through the church. I found myself on the street. I felt free, for the first time in my life. (p.68)

1938 had not ended when the General Council of the Congregation agreed on November 13 to expel and exclaustrate him. Years later, in 1965, the ecclesiastical hierarchy granted him "full dispensation" from priestly obligations.

He was critical of the Francoist uprising, which is why he remained in Paris during the hostilities, years in which he devoted himself to logic, to go into exile, after the war, in Ecuador (1939–42), Mexico City, Morelia, (1942) and finally in Venezuela, where he has established residence since 1946. So that the Spanish civil war ended with victory for Franco, García Bacca opted for the tropics of America.

=== Ecuador and Mexico ===
Upon arriving in the equatorial capital, already hired as a professor in the Philosophy section (which he himself inaugurated) of the Higher Institute of Pedagogy and Letters, he established a great friendship with Alfredo Gangotena. Also in Quito, he married Fanny Palacios Vásconez. Later in Mexico he would work as a professor of philosophy, mathematics, physics and Greek at the National Autonomous University of Mexico (UNAM). He also served as a collaborator of the Fondo de Cultura Económica and a member of La Casa de España in Mexico, later El Colegio de México, where he befriended Alfonso Reyes. During his stay in Morelia (Mexico) he was also a professor at the Universidad Michoacana. In 1943 he became a founding member of the Mexican Mathematical Society.

He entered El Colegio de México in April 1943. In June of that year and at the request of El Colegio he taught a course on Greek Philosophical Philology at the UNAM Faculty of Philosophy and Letters and another on Mathematical Logic at the Faculty of Sciences from the same institution. In 1946 he was entrusted with the direction of the Classical Greek Studies Seminar. He gave lectures at Universidad Michoacana de San Nicolás de Hidalgo in Morelia and courses at the University of Panama and the University of Costa Rica.

=== Success in Venezuela ===
Regarding the geopolitical situation of the Spanish-Republican philosopher, Alberto Ferrer García refers that in 1955 "due to the entry of Nationalist Spain into the UN, Alberto Ferrer García refers to that in 1955 "due to the entry of Nationalist Spain into the UN, all Republicans were left without a passport".2 García Bacca would confess already into the 21st century, in his Confessions:

"We were not going, I was not going, to request a Spanish passport, from Franco. He was stuck where he was. Luckily, in Venezuela. [...] The most natural resource was to naturalize myself as a Venezuelan. [...] Being naturalized, apart from the legal aspect, is [...] "giving oneself fully...". (pp. 87–88)

In Caracas (Venezuela) he had a fruitful philosophical career when he was the founder of the School of Philosophy at the Central University of Venezuela (UCV) in 1946 ―which was the first school of the Faculty of Philosophy and Letters, today the Faculty of Humanities and Education―, remaining active until 1971.5 At the same time, he taught at the Pedagogical Institute of Caracas (1947-1962). In 1952, he obtained Venezuelan nationality. His work at the UCV was very active: he was dean of the Faculty of Humanities and Education (1959-1960) and founding director of the Institute of Philosophy. He influenced the formation of Ernesto Mayz Vallenilla, Juan Nuño Montes, Ludovico Silva, Federico Riú, Eduardo Vásquez, J.R. Nuñez Tenorio, Elio Goméz Grillo, Guillermo Morón, Ignacio Burk, Alexis Márquez Rodríguez, J.R. Guillent Pérez and José Hernán Albornoz. When the dictator died, he returned to Spain several times, the first in the summer of 1977.

=== Later years ===
Bacca chose Ecuador as his final resting place, the Tumbaco valley, on the outskirts of Quito, where he spent his last years in the company of his wife, the Ecuadorian Fanny Palacios, his daughter Anita, his son-in-law Eduardo Pólit and the grandchildren Pólit García (until his death in 1992). The philosopher's private library at his home in Quito was donated in 2011 by his family to the Library of Navarra, dependent on the Government of Navarra.

== Contributions ==
The historian of philosophy, José Luis Abellán, acknowledges that,"he is perhaps the most powerful philosophical mind of all that we have in America and one of the first figures of philosophy in the Spanish language of all time. As far as his intellectual preparation is concerned, there will be few people who will reach the level he has reached."

His writings have been described as having a rigorous and philosophical style that drew both admiration and criticism.

García Bacca has been one of the best philosophers in Venezuela, Spain and the Spanish language. Known for his popularizing work on Western philosophy, his originality is just beginning to be understood in light of advances in science. His contributions have been overlooked partly because his enunciation space was a Latin American country, misnamed underdeveloped, and partly because his risky metaphorical and aphoristic prose, and even poetic, mathematical and musical, sometimes contradictory, left encrypted "philosophical instruments", as he used to call them, for later generations.

García Bacca insistently and honestly praises technique, thus paying a debt that philosophy had with it. A separate section is dedicated to this contribution later.

=== Metaphysics and theology ===
Bacca gave special attention to metaphysics and theology, and their contribution to the history of knowledge. An example of this is found in his book De él Infinito, transfinito, finito . In this work, the author assures that scholasticism marked the beginning of differential calculus . The Greeks saw no difference between the finite and infinite and the definite and indefinite respectively. And worse still, the Greeks repudiated the infinite-indefinite. But, in medieval times, Santo Tomas de Aquino (St. Thomas of Aquino) more so a theologian than a philosopher, he separated the infinite from the indefinite and gave positive value to the infinite by saying that God is definite but infinite. Historically, this gave rise to Newton and Leibniz, independently, and not so much as theologians but as mathematical philosophers. They felt "handsome and supported" to "invent and patent" the infinitesimal calculus .

Supported by the notion of the infinitesimal, he essays a metaphysics of soma as the foundation of creativity and immortality, perhaps comparable to Leibniz's monadology, where he states that:

Death to the macroscopic: to the body, is not death to the microscopic: to the soma. 11

Regarding this of immortality, Juan Nuño interprets in the prologue of Transfinitude and immortality : "This of immortality would come to be the "Nuclear Symphony" or "Symphony of the Nuclear Man", which is the one who never dies for having reached the transfinite level of knowledge. Something like the new exaltation of a superior, scientific-technological religion that the author proposes to call "radioanthropology", because as he explains, that is the force that impels man to transfinitude or escape from his natural and bodily closure." By the way García Bacca declares:

Life, the living being, in body and fortiori in soma is, and fortunately has to be, a supplier of novelties, an improviser of spontaneity, a premiere of originality; radiontological, radioanthropological, in occurrences, wits, thanks, wits, tricks, inventiveness, evasiveness, surprises, admiration, and improvisations.

== Acknowledgments ==
His work as an educator and philosopher was the subject of innumerable distinctions. The countries where he put down the most roots, Venezuela and Ecuador, did not skimp on recognizing him early as a great philosopher-literate. In 1978 Venezuela honored him with the National Prize for Literature. In 1981 he was awarded the Medal of Merit of the Republic of Ecuador.

Subsequently, Spain is not far behind. He was named Knight Grand Cross of the Order of Isabel la Católica in 1982. That same year in Caracas, his name was given to the Library of the Institute of Philosophy and the Juan David García Bacca Chair was created in the Faculty of Humanities and Education of the university. Central Venezuela.

Received from the Venezuelan government the Grand Cordon of the Order of the Liberator, a highest official distinction of the country from 1983.

That same year there was an acknowledgment that moved him greatly. In 1983, he was made a corresponding member of The (Platonic) Academy and invested with an Honoris Causa Doctorate by the National and Kapodistrian University of Athens.

On March 31, 1983, I received the appointment of corresponding member of the academy. / The one founded by Plato in 387 B.C. From which all subsequent ones have taken their name and work program, specifying each one [...] My appointment was written on parchment; its content in handwriting; letters drawn after the types of Greek letters, beautiful to see; and that I never tire of looking at, with a certain, I think excusable, philosopher's vanity. / I feel rewarded with the highest prize that a philosopher can aspire to, desire and yearn for, and satisfy. (p. 107)6

And the recognitions did not stop. He received the Silver Medal of the Autonomous University of Barcelona in 1984, the Homage Act of the Faculty of Philosophy of this university in 1985 as professor and first doctor of the same, the investiture as Doctor Honoris Causa by the Complutense University of Madrid in 1985.

In Ecuador they honor him again by admitting him as an Honorary Member of the Ecuadorian Academy of Language in 1986. And in Spain they also insist by naming him a member of the Advisory Council of the Institute of Philosophy of the CSIC in Madrid in 1990, and by awarding the Medal de Oro de Navarra, in the same year.

== Works ==
- De rebus metaphysice perfectis, seu de natura et supposito secundum primum totius philosophiae principium. Barcelona: Imprenta Claret, 1930.
- Assaigs Moderns per a la fonamentació de les matemàtiques. Vol. I. Barcelona: Institut d'Estudis Catalans, 1933. Vol. II 1934.
- Fundamentación de las matemáticas. Barcelona: 1934.
- Introducció a la logística amb applicacions a la filosofía i a les matemàtiques. 2 vols. Barcelona: Institut d'Estudis Catalans (Biblioteca Filosófica, 3–4), 1934.
- Lógica matemática. Vol I. Barcelona: 1934. Vol. II: 1935.
- Lógica matemática. Vol. II. Barcelona: 1935.
- Ensayo sobre la estructura lógico-genética de las ciencias físicas (Tesis Doctoral en Filosofía). Barcelona: Universidad Autónoma, 1935
- Introducción a la lógica moderna. Barcelona: Labor, 1936.
- Introducción al filosofar (Incitaciones y sugerencias). Tucumán (Argentina): Imprenta Miguel Violetto, Universidad Nacional de Tucumán, 1939.
- Interpretation historique de la logique classique et moderne. París: Hermann (Actualités scientifiques), 1939.
- Invitación a filosofar. Vol. I: La Forma del Conocer Filosófico. México: Fondo de Cultura Económica, 1940. Vol. II: 1942
- Filosofía de las ciencias. Teoría de la relatividad. México: Editorial Séneca (Colección Árbol), 1941.
- Tipos históricos del filosofar físico, desde Hesíodo hasta Kant. Tucumán (Argentina): Imprenta Miguel Violetto, Universidad Nacional de Tucumán, 1941.
- Invitación a filosofar. Vol. II: El conocimiento científico. México: Fondo de Cultura Económica, 1942.
- Introducción general a las Enéadas. Buenos Aires: Losada (Biblioteca Filosófica), 1942.
- Sobre estética griega. México: UNAM, Imprenta Universitaria, 1943.
- Filosofía en metáfora y parábolas. Introducción literaria a la filosofía. México: Editora Central, 1945, 1964.
- Nueve grandes filósofos contemporáneos y sus temas. Vol. I: Bergson, Husserl, Unamuno, Heidegger, Scheler, Hartmann. Vol. II: W. James, Ortega y Gasset, Whitehead. Caracas: Imprenta Nacional, Ministerio de Educación Nacional de Venezuela, 1947. Nueva edición en 1990.
- Introducción general a las Enéadas. Buenos Aires: Losada, 19482
- Siete modelos de filosofar. Caracas: Universidad Central de Venezuela, 1950. 19632.
- Las ideas de ser y estar; de posibilidad y realidad en la idea de hombre, según la filosofía actual. Barcelona: Laye, 1955.
- Antropología filosófica contemporánea (Diez conferencias 1955). Caracas: Universidad Central de Venezuela, 1957. Edición revisada: Anthropos: Barcelona, 1982.
- Gnoseología y ontología en Aristóteles. Caracas: Universidad Central, 1967. Separata de Episteme. Anuario de Filosofía de la Facultad de Humanidades y Educación (Universidad Central de Venezuela, Caracas) nº 1 (1957): 3–68.
- Elementos de Filosofía. Caracas: Universidad Central de Venezuela (Manuales Universitarios, nº 3) 19591. 19755. 19816.
- Antropología y ciencia contemporáneas (Curso de diez lecciones). Caracas: Instituto Pedagógico, 1961. revised edition in Anthropos: Barcelona, 1983.
- Existencialismo. Xalapa (México): Universidad Veracruzana, 1962.
- Filosofía de las ciencias. La física. Caracas: Instituto Pedagógico, 1962.
- Historia filosófica de la ciencia. México: Universidad Autónoma de México, 19631.
- Metafísica natural estabilizada y problemática metafísica espontánea. México: Fondo de Cultura Económica, 1963.
- Siete modelos de filosofar. Caracas: Universidad Central de Venezuela (Colección Avance, nº 5), 1963.
- Introducción literaria a la filosofía. Caracas: Universidad Central de Venezuela, 19642.
- Filosofía en metáforas y en parábolas. Introducción Literaria a la Filosofía. México: Editora Central, 19451.
- Antología del pensamiento filosófico venezolano. Vols. II y III. Introducción y selección. Caracas: Ministerio de Educación, 1964.
- Humanismo teórico, práctico y positivo según Marx. México: Fondo de Cultura Económica, 19651. Revised in 1974, 1980. 1982 as Presente, pasado y porvenir de Marx y del marxismo
- Elementos de filosofía de las ciencias. Caracas: Universidad Central de Venezuela (Manuales universitarios, nº 1), 1967.
- Invitación a filosofar según espíritu y letra de Antonio Machado. Mérida (Venezuela): Universidad de los Andes, Facultad de Humanidades y Educación, 1967. Edición revisada: Anthropos: Barcelona, 1984.
- Elogio de la técnica. Caracas: Monte Avila (Colección Estudios), 1968.
- Textos clásicos para la historia de las ciencias. Vol. II. Caracas: Universidad Central de Venezuela, 1968. Vol. I: 1961.
- Curso sistemático de filosofía actual (Filosofía, ciencia, historia, dialéctica y sus applicaciones). Caracas: Universidad Central de Venezuela, Dirección de Cultura (Colección Humanismo y Ciencia, nº 8), 1969.
- Los clásicos griegos de Miranda (Autobiografía). Caracas: Universidad Central de Venezuela, 1969.
- Ensayos. Barcelona: Península (Colección Historia, Ciencia, Sociedad, nº 69), 1970.
- Lecciones de historia de la filosofía. Vol. I. Caracas: Imprenta Universitaria, Universidad Central de Venezuela, 1972. Vol. II: 1973.
- Lecturas de historia de la filosofía. Caracas: Síntesis Dosmil, 1972.
- "Sobre el sentido de "conciencia" en la "Celestina"". Anuario de Humanitas (Universidad Autónoma de Nuevo León, Monterrey, México) nº 14 (1973): 106–117.
- Ensayos y estudios. Milán: Vanni Scheiwiller, 1975.
- Cosas y personas. México: Fondo de Cultura Económica, 1977.
- Teoría y metateoría de la ciencia. Curso sistemático. Vol. I: Teoría de la ciencia. Caracas: Universidad Central de Venezuela, 1977.
- Simón Rodriguez. Pensador para América. Caracas: Imprenta Nacional, Ministry of Information and Tourism, 1978
- Elementos de Filosofía. Caracas: U.C.V., 19755. 19591.
- Filosofía y teoría de la relatividad. Valencia: Cuadernos Teorema, 1979.
- Antropología filosófica contemporánea (Diez conferencias 1955). Barcelona: Anthropos, 1982.
- Vida, muerte, inmortalidad. Caracas: Universidad Central de Venezuela, 1983.
- Antropología y ciencia contemporáneas (Curso de diez lecciones). Barcelona: Anthropos, 1983.
- Tres ejercicios literario-filosóficos de dialéctica. Barcelona: Anthropos, 1983.
- Teoría y metateoría de la ciencia. Vol. II. Caracas: Universidad Central de Venezuela, 1984.
- Tres ejercicios literario-filosóficos de antropología. Barcelona: Anthropos, 1984.
- Tres ejercicios literario-filosóficos de moral. Barcelona: Anthropos, 1984.
- Infinito, transfinito, finito. Barcelona: Anthropos, 1984.
- Invitación a filosofar según espíritu y letra de Antonio Machado. Barcelona: Anthropos, 1984.
- Transfinitud e inmortalidad. Caracas: Josefina Bigott Edit., 1984.
- Teoría y metateoría de la ciencia. Vol. II. Caracas: Biblioteca de la Universidad Central de Venezuela, 1984.
- Presente, pasado y porvenir de Marx y del marxismo. México: Fondo de Cultura Económica, 1982.
- Parménides (s. V a.C.)-Mallarmé (s. XIX d.C.) Necesidad y Azar. Barcelona: Anthropos, 1985.
- Tres ejercicios literario-filosóficos de lógica y metafísica. Barcelona: Anthropos, 1986.
- Qué es dios y Quién es Dios. Barcelona: Anthropos, 1986.
- Elogio de la técnica. Barcelona: Anthropos, 1987.
- Pasado, presente y porvenir de grandes nombres. Mitología, teogonía, teología, filosofía, ciencia, técnica. Vol. I. México: Fondo de Cultura Económica, 1988.
- De magia a técnica. Ensayo de teatro filosófico-literario-técnico. Barcelona: Anthropos, 1989.
- Pasado, presente y porvenir de grandes nombres: Mitología, teogonía, teología, filosofía, ciencia, técnica. Vol. II. México: Fondo de Cultura Económica, 1989.
- Filosofía de la música. Barcelona: Anthropos, 1990.
- Sobre "el Quijote" y Don Quijote de la Mancha. Ejercicios literario-filosóficos. Barcelona-Pamplona: Coedición Anthropos-Gobierno de Navarra, 1991.
- "Autobiografía "exterior"". Anthropos (Barcelona) nº 9, nueva edición (1991): 17–18.
- Confesiones. Barcelona: Coedición de la Universidad Central de Venezuela-Anthropos, 2000: 115–118.
- "Autobiografía intelectual". Anthropos (Barcelona) nº 9, nueva edición (1991): 18–24. Confesiones. Barcelona: Coedición de la Universidad Central de Venezuela-Anthropos, 2000: 119–137.
- Sobre virtudes y vicios. Tres ejercicios literario-filosóficos. Barcelona: Anthropos, 1993.
- Confesiones. Autobiografía íntima y exterior. Barcelona: Coedición Universidad Central de Venezuela-Anthropos, 2000.
- Divertimentos y migajas. Ecuador: Casa de la Cultura Ecuatoriana "Benjamín Carrión", 2001.
- Sobre filantropía. Tres ejercicios literario-filosóficos (filantropía divina, divino-humana, humana). Barcelona: Coedición Anthropos-Universidad Pública de Navarra-Gobierno de Navarra, 2001.
- Sobre realismo. Tres ejercicios literario-filosóficos (natural, crítico, integral). (Publicado como Balance histórico desde los griegos hasta el año dos mil). Barcelona: Coedición Anthropos-Universidad Pública de Navarra-Gobierno de Navarra, 2001.
- Ensayos y Estudios (Compilación y selección de Cristina García Palacios y José Rafael Revenga). Caracas: Editorial Melvin. Fundación para la Cultura Urbana, 2002.

=== Translations ===
- Parménides: El poema de Parménides (Atentado de hermenéutica histórico-vital). Traducción y comentarios. México: UNAM, Imprenta Universitaria, 1942.
- Platón: Obras de Platón. 3 vols. Traducción, introducción y notas. México: UNAM, 1942–1946.
- Plotino: Presencia y experiencia de Dios (Selección de textos). Traducción y notas. México: Editorial Séneca (Colección El Clavo ardiendo), 1942
- Plotino: Primera Enéada de Plotino. Traducción, introducción y notas. Buenos Aires: Losada, 19421.
- Tres poemas primitivos de la filosofía griega. Traducción y notas. Quito: Imprenta de la Universidad, 1942.
- Los presocráticos. Vol I: Jenófanes, Parménides, Empédocles. Traducción, prólogo y notas sobre edición de Diels-Kranz. México: El Colegio de México, 1943. Vol II: 1944. Caracas: Universidad Central de Venezuela, 1955 (reedición).
- Plotino: Primera Enéada de Plotino (ocho primeras secciones). Traducción en El Hijo Pródigo (México) I.5 (1943): 436–440.
- Euclides: Elementos de geometría (precedidos de Los fundamentos de la geometría, de David Hilbert). Traducción, introducción y notas. México: UNAM, 1944.
- Heidegger, Martin: Hoelderling y la esencia de la poesía. Seguido de Esencia del fundamento. Versión, prólogo y notas. México: Editorial Séneca, 19441.
- Los presocráticos. Vol. II. Refranero clásico griego, Alcmenón, Zenón, Meliso, Filolao, Anaxágoras, Diógenes de Apolonia, Leucipo, Metrodoro de Kio, Demócrito. Traducción, prólogo y notas. México: El Colegio de México, 1944. Vol. I: 1943. Caracas: U.C.V., 1955 (reedición).
- Platón: Banquete. Ion. Traducción, introducciones y notas. México: UNAM (Colección de la UNAM. Edición bilingüe), 1944.
- Platón: Eutifrón. Apología. Critón. Traducción, introducciones y notas. México: UNAM (Colección de la UNAM. Edición bilingüe), 19441. 19652.
- Aristóteles: Poética. Traducción, introducción y notas. México: UNAM, 19451. Caracas: UCV, 19702. 19783.
- Jenofonte: Memorables (Recuerdos socráticos). Traducción, prólogo y notas. México: Secretaría de Educación Pública (Biblioteca Enciclopédica Popular nº 67), 1945.
- Platón: Hipias mayor. Fedro. Traducción, introducción y notas. México: UNAM (Colección de la UNAM. Edición bilingüe), 1945.
- Tucídides: Guerra del Peloponeso. Traducción, selección y notas. México: Secretaría de Educ. Pública (Biblioteca enciclopédica popular nº 76), 1945.
- Jenofonte: Recuerdos de Sócrates. Banquete. Apología. Traducción, introducciones y notas. México: UNAM, 1946
- Plotino: Primera Enéada de Plotino. Traducción y notas. Buenos Aires: Losada, 19482.
- Jenofonte: Socráticas. Ciropedia. Economía. Traducción y estudio preliminar. Buenos Aires: W.M. Jackson (Clásicos Jackson vol. XXIII), 19491. 19522.
- Heidegger, M.: Doctrina de la verdad, según Platón y Carta sobre el humanismo. Cotraducción con A. Wagner de Reyna. Santiago de Chile: Universidad de Chile (Colección Tradición y Tarea), 1953.
- Antología del pensamiento filosófico venezolano. Vol. I: Siglos XVII-XVIII. Traducción del latín, introducción sistemática, prólogos históricos y selección de textos. Caracas: Ministerio de Educación. Dirección de Cultura y Bellas Artes, 1954. Vol. II: Siglos XVIII: Suárez y Urbina, 1964. Vol. III: Siglo XIX: Andrés Bello, 1964.
- La Doctrina de la Justa Guerra contra los Indios en Venezuela (Tres documentos inéditos del Archivo del Palacio Arzobispal de Caracas). Traducción de las notas Latinas. Caracas: Universidad Central de Venezuela, 1954.
- Alfonso Briceño: Disputaciones metafísicas (1638). Traducción del original Latino e introducción. Caracas: Universidad Central de Venezuela, 1955.
- Antología del pensamiento filosófico de Colombia (de 1647 a 1761). Selección de manuscritos, textos, traducción del latín e introducción. Bogotá: Imprenta Nacional (Biblioteca de la Presidencia de Colombia, nº 21), 1955.
- Fragmentos filosóficos de los presocráticos. Traducción y selección. Caracas: Universidad Central de Venezuela, 1955 (reedición de la obra de 1943–1944).
- Heidegger, M.: Hölderlin y la esencia de la poesía. Traducción. Revista Nacional de Cultura (Caracas) nº 109 (1955): 163–174.
- Filosofía y teoría de la relatividad. Quito: Casa de la Cultura Ecuatoriana, 1956. Valencia: Cuadernos Teorema, 1979.
- Textos clásicos para la historia de las ciencias. Vol I. Caracas: Universidad Central de Venezuela, 1961. Vol. II: 1968.
- Refranero, poemas, sentenciario de los primeros filósofos griegos. Selección, traducción e introducción. Caracas: Editorial Mediterráneo, 19622.
- Fragmentos filosóficos de los presocráticos. Traducción y selección. Caracas: Ministerio de Educación, 1963.
- Heidegger, M.: Hoelderlin y la esencia de la poesía. Traducción y comentarios. Mérida (Venezuela): Universidad de los Andes, 1968.
- Platón: Sobre la Belleza y el amor (Fedro, Banquete, Hipias). Traducción. Caracas-Madrid: Editorial Mediterráneo, 19681. 1972.
- Aristóteles: Poética. Versión directa, introducción y notas. Caracas: Universidad Central de Venezuela (Colección Temas), 19702. México: UNAM, 19451.
- Refranero, poemas, sentenciario de los primeros filósofos griegos. Selección, traducción e introducción. Caracas-Madrid: Editorial Mediterráneo, 19723. 19591.
- Marx, Karl: Differencia entre la filosofía de la naturaleza según Demócrito y Epicuro (Tesis doctoral). Traducción. Caracas: Universidad Central de Venezuela, 1973.
- Tomás de Aquino: Del ente y de la esencia. Comentarios por Fr. Tomás Cayetano, OP. Traducción. Caracas: U.C.V. (Colección Filosófica, nº 5), 1974.
- Aristóteles: Poética. Traducción, introducción y notas. Caracas: U.C.V., 19783. México: UNAM, 19451.
- Scholtz, H.: La axiomática de los antiguos. Traducción y prólogo. Caracas: Universidad Central de Venezuela (Colección Las Ciencias, nº 6), 1978.
- Platón: Obras Completas. Traducción, prólogo, notas y clave hermenéutica. Caracas: Coedición de la Presidencia de la República y la Universidad Central de Venezuela, 1980–82.
- Heidegger, Martin: Hölderlin y la esencia de la poesía. Traducción, comentarios y prólogo. Barcelona: Anthropos, 19893.
- Kant: Dissertaciones Latinas de Kant. Traducción. Caracas: Universidad Central de Venezuela (Colección Avance, nº 39), 1974
- Hegel, G.W.F.: Scripta Latina minora. Dos discursos Latinos. Traducción. Cultura Universitaria (Caracas) nº 100 (1973): 109–125.
