= Fernando Báez (writer) =

Venezuelan writer

Fernando Báez (born San Félix, Ciudad Guayana, Venezuela) is a Venezuelan writer, poet, essayist and "El Director de la Biblioteca Nacional de Venezuela". He is known for his work on the destruction of Iraqi books and art caused by the invasion of Iraq in 2003.

== Career ==
Báez has a degree in education and a doctorate in library science, and worked for several years at the University of the Andes in Mérida, Venezuela, where he studied Greek and Latin under José Manuel Briceño Guerrero. He was declared a persona non-grata by the United States authorities, after the publication of his book on Iraq.

== Works ==
- Historia de la Antigua Biblioteca de Alejandría (2003)
- Historia Universal de la Destrucción de Libros (2004)
- La Destrucción Cultural de Iraq (2004)
- A Universal History of the Destruction of Books: From Ancient Sumer to Modern Iraq. Translated by Mac Adam, Alfred J. New York: Atlas & Company. 2008. ISBN 978-1-934633-01-4.
- Las maravillas perdidas del mundo: Breve historia de las grandes catástrofes culturales de la civilización (in Spanish). Océano. 25 June 2013. ISBN 978-607-400-851-7.
- El saqueo cultural de América Latina: de la conquista a la globalización (in Spanish). Debate. 2009. ISBN 978-84-8306-835-9.
- Los primeros libros de la humanidad: El mundo antes de la imprenta y el libro electrónico (in Spanish). Océano. 1 July 2015. ISBN 978-607-735-491-8.

Novels

- El traductor de Cambridge (in Spanish). Lengua de Trapo. 2005. ISBN 978-84-96080-46-1.

Translations

- Los Fragmentos de Aristóteles (in Spanish). Universidad de los Andes, Ediciones del Vicerrectorado Académico. 2002.
- Poética de Aristóteles (in Spanish). Universidad de los Andes, Ediciones del Vicerrectorado Académico. 2002.

== See also ==
- Destruction of libraries
- Book burning
