= Central University of Venezuela =

Venezuelan public university

- Universidad Central de Venezuela
- Motto: La Casa que Vence la Sombra (Spanish, "The house that defeats the shadow")
- Type: Public
- Established: 22 December 1721; 304 years ago (Universidad Real y Pontificia de Caracas)
- Rector: Víctor Rago Albujas
- Faculty: 5,176
- Administrative staff: 9,778
- Students: 41,059
- Location: Caracas, Maracay and Barquisimeto, Venezuela
- Campus: World Heritage Site, Urban, 1.642 km²
- Website: ucv.ve

The Central University of Venezuela (Spanish: Universidad Central de Venezuela; UCV) is a public university located in Caracas, Venezuela. Founded in 1721, it is the oldest university in Venezuela and one of the oldest in the Western Hemisphere.

The main university campus, Ciudad Universitaria de Caracas, was designed by architect Carlos Raúl Villanueva and it is considered a masterpiece of urban planning and was declared a World Heritage Site by UNESCO in 2000.

== History ==
=== Origins ===
The origin of the university goes back to Friar Antonio González de Acuña (1620–1682), a Spanish Bishop born in present-day Peru who studied theology at the Universidad de San Marcos and founded in 1673 the Seminary Saint Rose of Lima in Caracas named after the first Catholic Saint born in the Americas. In the following years, Friar Diego de Baños y Sotomayor broadened the scope of the seminary by creating the School and Seminary of Saint Rose of Lima in 1696. Yet, in spite of the creation of the seminar, students who wished to obtain a university degree had to travel great distances to attend universities located in Santo Domingo, Bogotá or Mexico City. Given such harsh circumstances, the Rector of the Seminary, Francisco Martínez de Porras and the people of Caracas requested the royal court in Madrid the creation of a university in Venezuela (then part of the Viceroyalty of New Granada). As a result, on 22 December 1721 Philip V of Spain signed in Lerma a Royal Decree that transformed the School-Seminary into the Universidad Real y Pontificia de Caracas (Royal and Pontifical University of Caracas). The Royal Decree was concurred by Pope Innocent XIII with a Papal bull in 1722. The university offered degrees in philosophy, Theology, Canon law and Medicine. Until 1810, when the Seminary of Saint Bonaventura located in Mérida became the Universidad de Los Andes, the Universidad Real y Pontificia de Caracas was the only university existing in the country.

University rankings

Global – Overall
- QS World: 731-740 (2026)

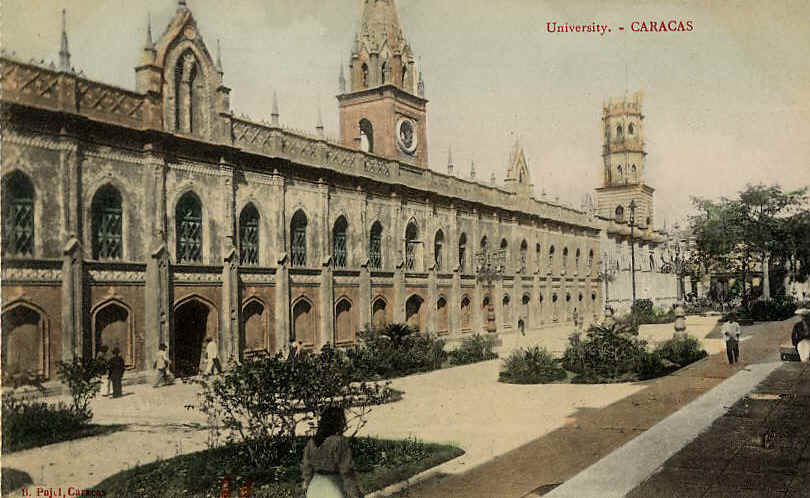
The old campus in 1911. The building also served as the location for the National Library when it was founded in 1833. It is currently known as the Palacio de las Academias which is Spanish for "Palace of Academies"

=== Republican years ===
Until the end of the 18th century, the official papal and royal censorship on books was largely ignored in Venezuela, a situation which allowed the smuggling of the works by Rousseau, Voltaire, Diderot, Montesquieu, Locke, Helvetius, Grotius in the ships belonging to the Guipuzcoana Company.

The Royal constitution was displaced by the Republican Statutes proclaimed by Simón Bolívar on 24 June 1827. The new statutes gave the institution a secular character and transferred the main authority to the Rector.

=== 20th century ===
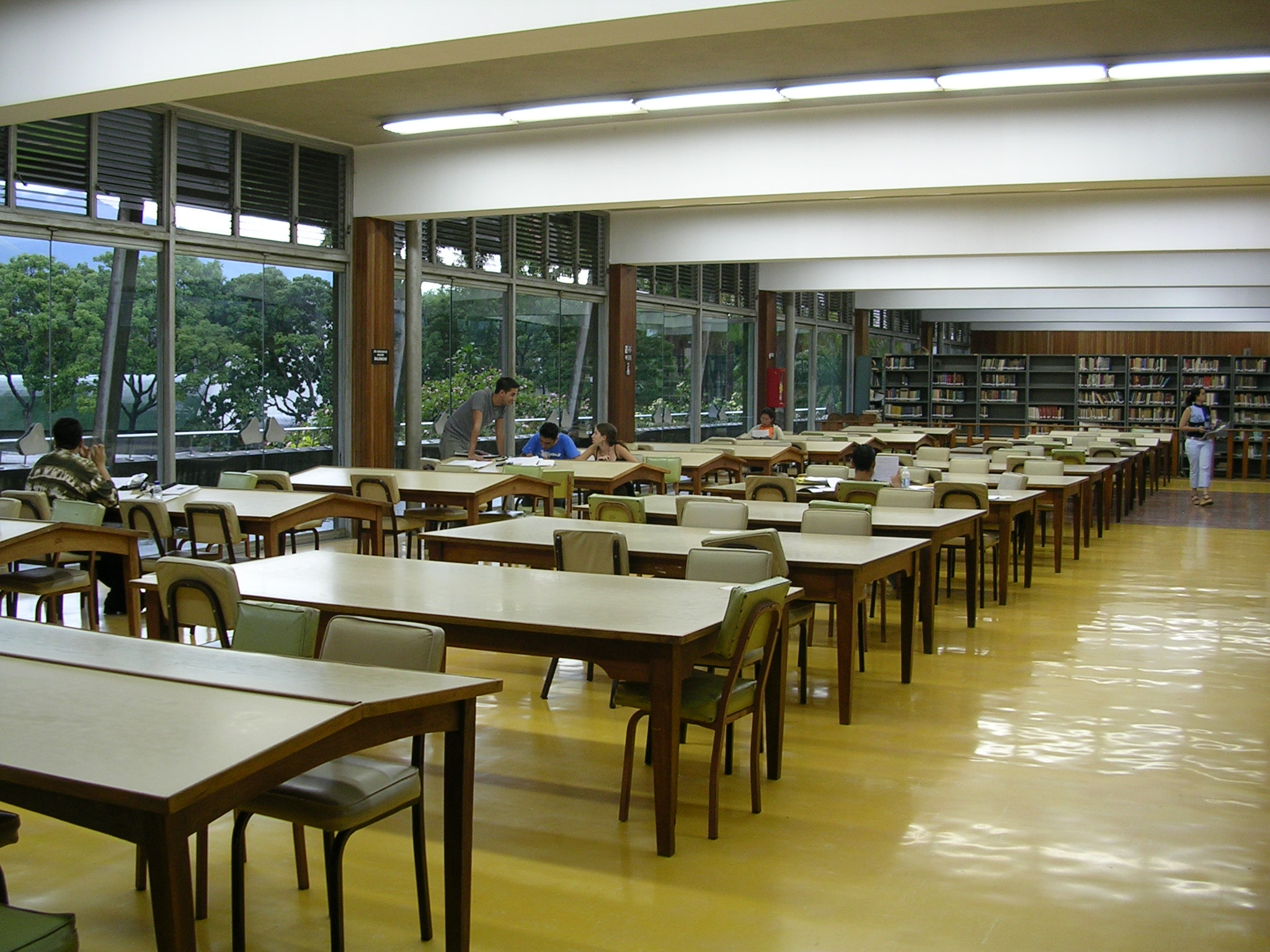
Central Library

In December 1908, dictator Juan Vicente Gómez came into power with a coup d'état against the government of Cipriano Castro. Gómez stayed in power until his death in 1935 and during this time, having ambivalent feelings about the purpose of educating free minds when he could hire foreigners to exercise any technical requirements for the nation, decided to close the university from 1912 to 1922. When it reopened, the Rector Felipe Guevara Rojas had reorganized the traditional division of only a few schools, separating them into departments.

1928 became a very important year for the university when a group of students, known as the Generation of 1928, organized events during the "Students Week" protesting the dictatorship which culminated in an attempt to overthrow Gómez on 7 April of that year. This group, which shared a common front against Gómez, was conformed by people like Rómulo Betancourt, Miguel Otero Silva, Juan Oropeza, Isaac Pardo and Rodolfo Quintero. Most of them were jailed after the events or went into exile without being able to finish their studies.

The university continued to be at the forefront of the democratization of the country when in 1936, then President Eleazar López Contreras, ordered a decree suspending the Constitutional rights and declaring a general censorship of the press because the oil workers decided to start a strike (an unprecedented deed at the time). The rector of the university, Francisco Antonio Rísquez, led the protest that followed through the streets of Caracas against the policies of López Contreras.

By 1942, the student population had been growing steadily for decades without any significant expansion of the university. Instead several schools, like Medicine, were moved to other buildings around the city. The administration of President Isaías Medina Angarita felt the need to move the university to a larger and more modern location where it could function as coherent whole. The government bought the Hacienda Ibarra and the responsibility of the main design was given to the architect Carlos Raúl Villanueva after a visit to the University City of Bogotá convinced the authorities of the Ministry of Public Works that, in order to avoid constructing a group of heterogeneous buildings, the design should be under one architect.

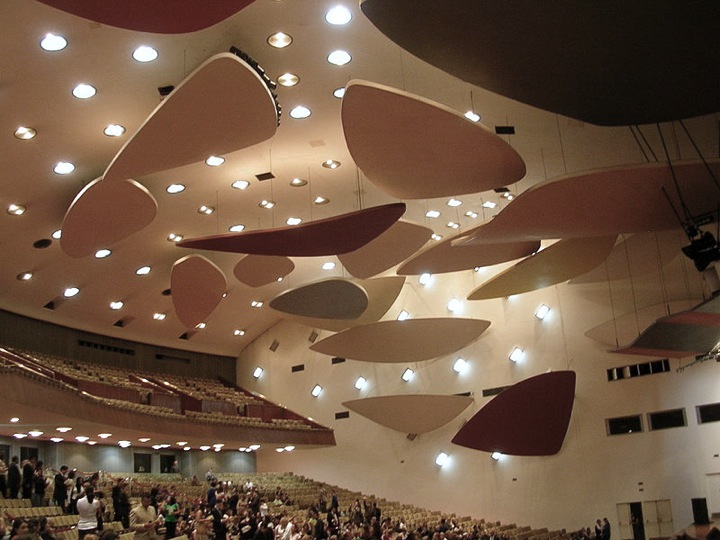
Floating Clouds, 1953, by Alexander Calder in the Aula Magna

The new campus was going to become a vast urban complex of about 200 hectares and included 40 buildings. Villanueva worked with 28 avant-garde artists of the time, from Venezuela and the rest of the world, to build what continues to be one of the most successful applications of Modern Architecture in Latin America. Villanueva's guiding principle was the creation of a space where art and architecture cohabited in harmony in a "Synthesis of Arts". Among some of the most important pieces present in the university are the 1953 Floating Clouds by Alexander Calder, murals by Victor Vasarely, Wifredo Lam, Fernand Léger and sculptures by Jean Arp and Henri Laurens. The Ciudad Universitaria de Caracas was declared World Heritage by UNESCO, and it is the only modern university campus designed by a single architect to receive such high honor.

In 1958, after the fall of dictator Marcos Pérez Jiménez, a government commission established a new law for the universities. The new law came into place on 5 December, guaranteeing that faculty and students could work in an environment of freedom and tolerance. This very important legal foundation was however abused during the 1960s when guerrilla rebels, supported by Fidel Castro took refuge inside the university campus to escape prosecution from the government. This tense situation came to a stalemate in 1969 when students asking for a reform took over the university. On 3 October 1970, the administration of President Rafael Caldera ordered the university to be raided by the military and Rector Jesús María Bianco was forced to resign. The university reopened in 1971 with a new Rector and a new plan for renovation.

In terms of the academic development of the modern university, the second half of the 20th century was a time when the Central University's faculty body benefited greatly from the influx of European immigrants. Many intellectuals settled in Venezuela after the end of the Spanish Civil War and World War II and found jobs at the university. Those scientists and humanists helped develop lines of research and teaching at the university and educated many of the present generation of faculty members.

== Organization and degrees ==
The university is organized into 11 schools (Facultades) which are subdivided into 40 departments (Escuelas).

All schools offer undergraduate degrees at the level of Licenciatura (5 years) and graduate degrees at the level of master's degree (2 years) and PhD (3–4 years) from the Graduate School. The Graduate School, founded in 1941, offers 222 different specializations, 109 Master's degrees and 40 PhDs.

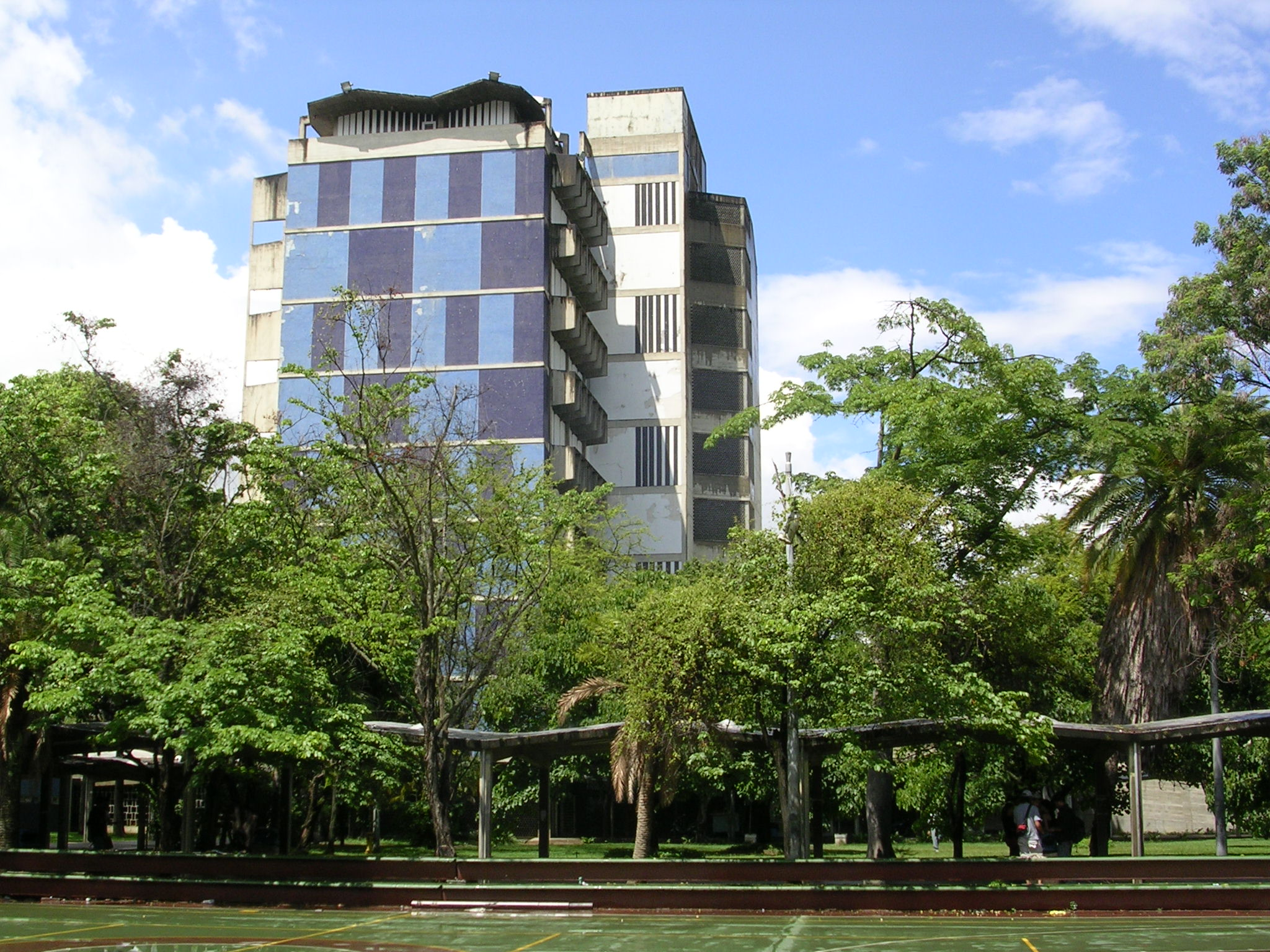
School of Architecture. Mural by Alejandro Otero

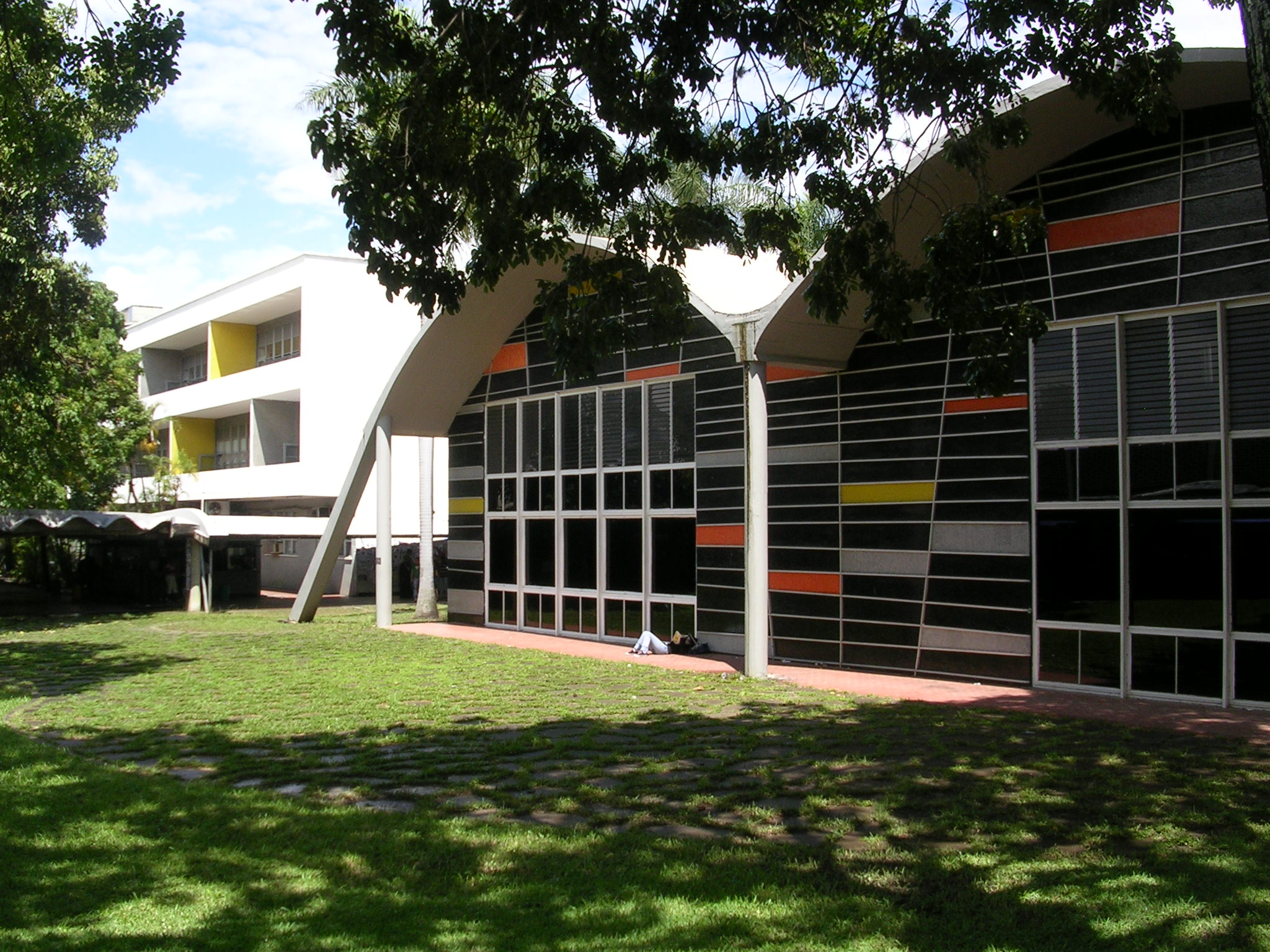
School of Engineering. Mural by Alejandro Otero

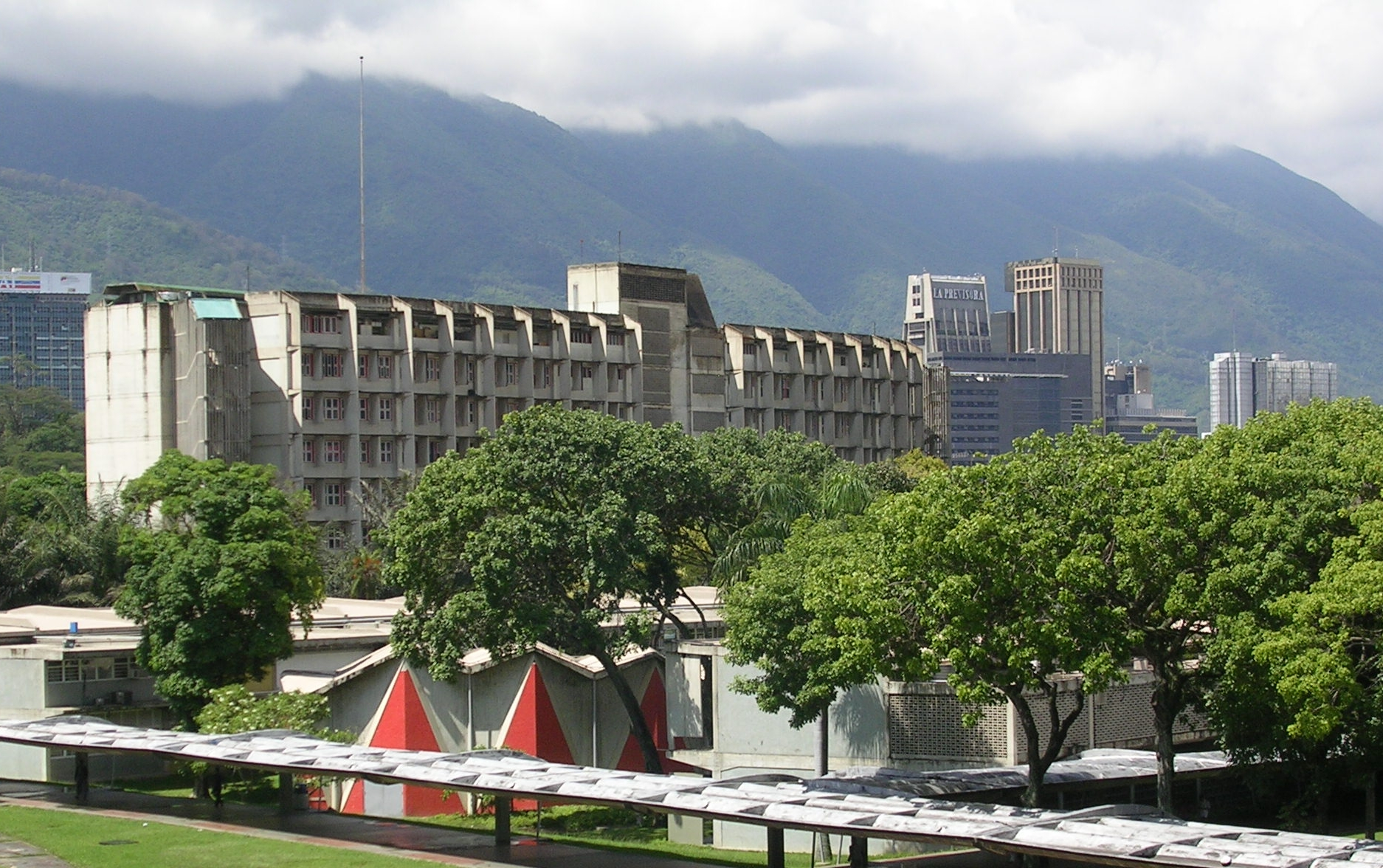
Schools of Humanities, Social Sciences and Economy

- Architecture and Urban planning
- Agronomy
- Dentistry
- Engineering

- Civil Engineering
- Geodesic Engineering
- Electrical Engineering
- Hidrometeorologic Engineering
- Geophysical Engineering
- Geological Engineering
- Mining Engineering
- Metallurgic Engineering
- Mechanical Engineering
- Petroleum Engineering
- Chemical Engineering

- Humanities and Education

- Art
- Education
- History
- Library Science
- Literature
- Geography
- Philosophy
- Psychology
- Social communication
- Modern Languages

- Law and Government

- Law
- Political Science

- Medicine

- Bioanalysis
- Medicine
- Nutrition
- Dentistry
- Nursing

- Social Sciences and Economy

- Anthropology
- Administration
- Economy
- International Studies
- Statistics
- Sociology
- Social Work

- Pharmacy
- Sciences

- Biology
- Chemistry
- Computer Science
- Geochemistry
- Physics
- Mathematics

- Veterinary

== Research ranking ==
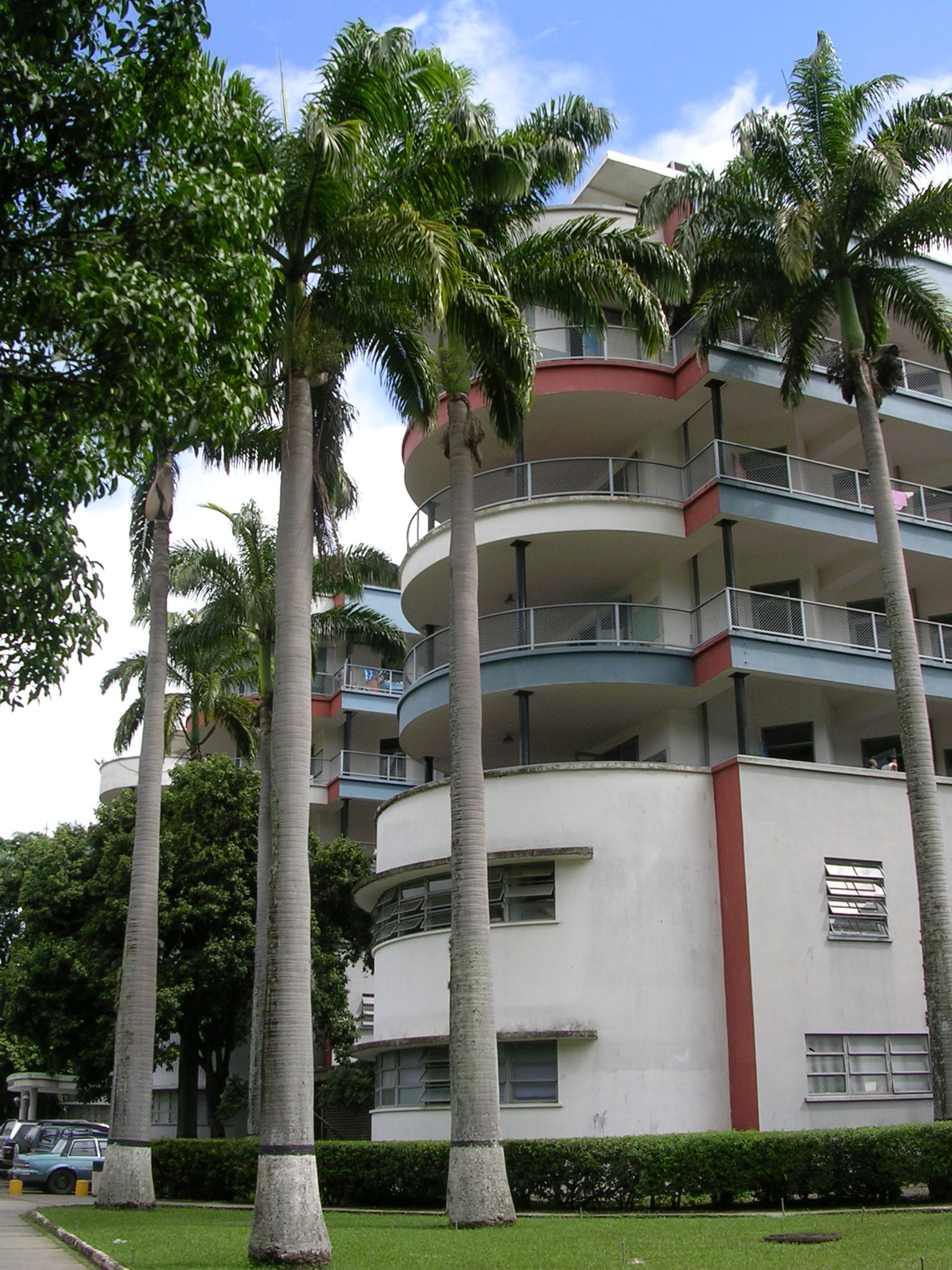
University Hospital

The Ranking Iberoamericano de Instituciones de Investigacion based on the Institute for Scientific Information ranked the Central University of Venezuela as the most productive research institution in the country and as the 20th most productive in Latin America. Other top 25 positions were reached in the following areas:

- 8th in Law
- 10th in Social Sciences
- 12th in Psychology and Education
- 15th in Physiology and Pharmacology
- 16th in Philology and Philosophy
- 16th in Food technology
- 18th in Mathematics
- 18th in Medicine
- 21st in Plant and Animal Biology
- 21st in History and Art
- 22nd in Architecture and Civil Engineering
- 22nd Molecular Biology

The 2010 University Ranking by Academic Performance (URAP), ranked the UCV as the best university in Venezuela and 805th university in the world.

The 2016 QS World University Rankings placed the UCV as 18th overall in their Latin American Universities Ranking.

== Notable alumni ==
Among its faculty, alumni, and researchers include several Founding Fathers, 19 Venezuelan presidents, National Architecture Award winners, winners of National Prize for Science, Technology, and Innovation, members of the National Assembly, 2 Princess of Asturias Award winners, a Nobel Prize for Physiology or Medicine laureate, a Cervantes Prize and a saint of the Catholic Church.

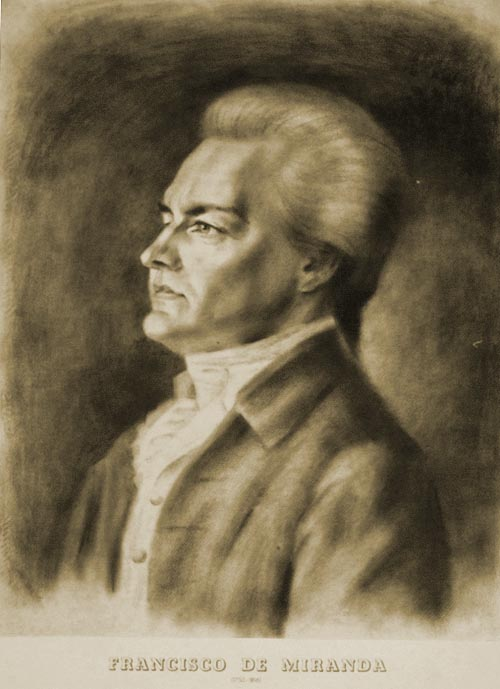
Francisco de Miranda

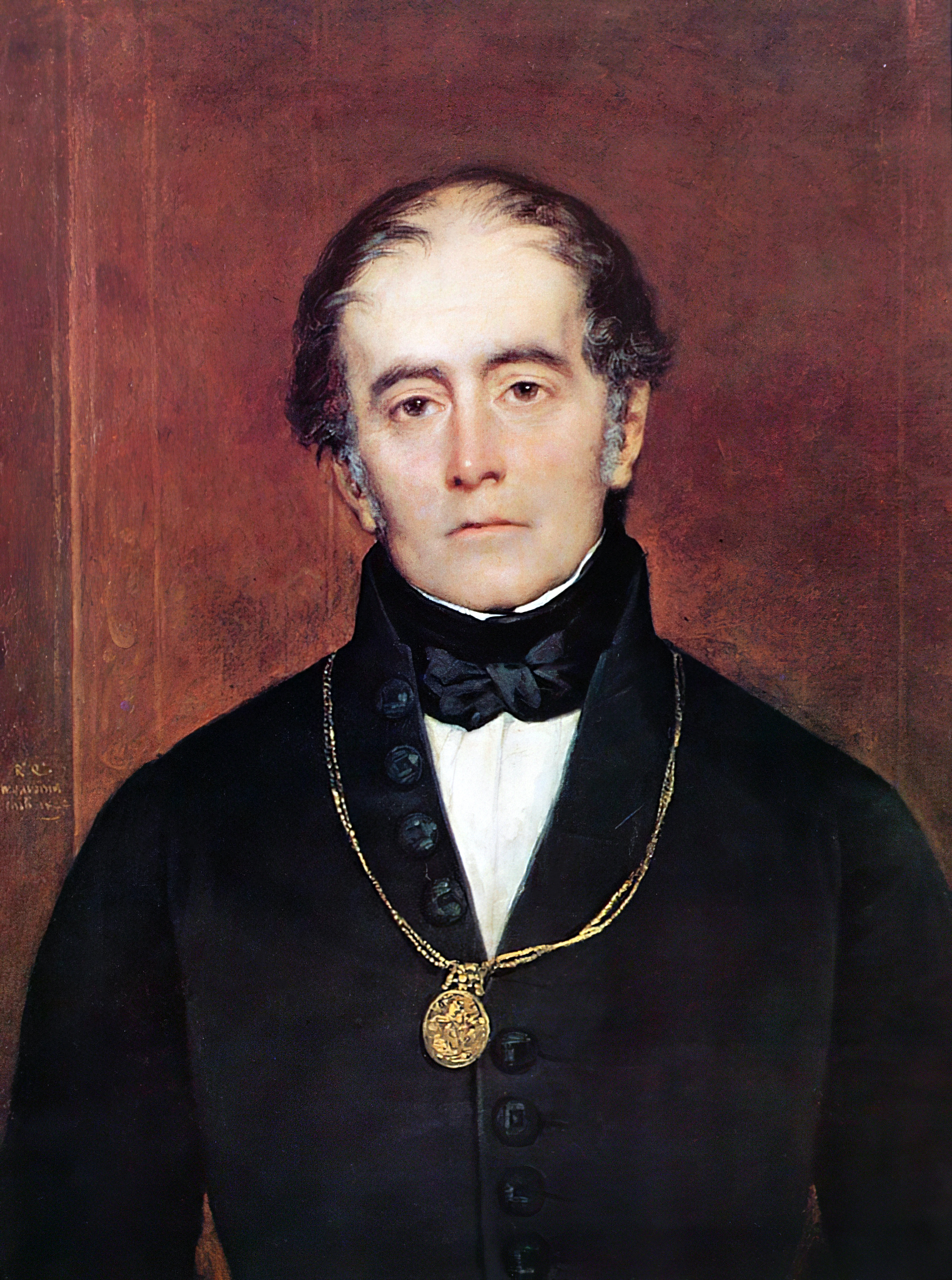
Andrés Bello

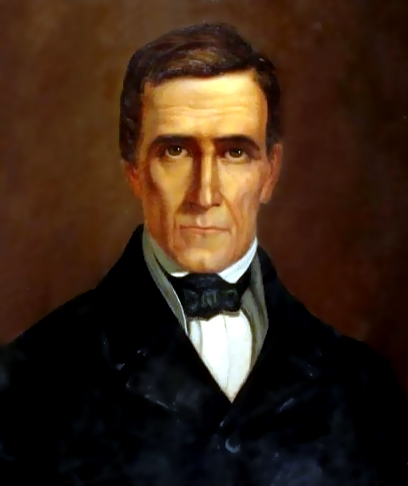
José María Vargas

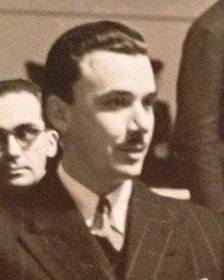
Carlos Eduardo Stolk

=== Humanists ===
- Francisco de Miranda (1750–1816) General, political thinker; fought in the main three revolutionary wars of the 18th century, American, French and South American.
- Andrés Bello (1781–1865) Poet, lawmaker, philosopher, educator and philologist.
- Sylvia Constantinidis (1962) Pianist, composer, conductor, music educator, author, writer. (Original name: Maria Silvia Castillo Casanova Arismendi de Constantinidis).
- Juan Germán Roscio (1763–1821) Lawyer, main redactor of the Venezuelan Declaration of Independence.
- Andrés Eloy Blanco (1896–1955) Poet.
- Miguel Otero Silva (1908–1985) Writer, journalist and co-founder of the newspaper El Nacional.
- María Teresa Castillo (1908–2012) Journalist, activist, politician and founder of Caracas Athenaeum.
- Alberto Barrera Tyszka (1960) Writer.
- Diannet Blanco, human rights activist.

=== Scientists ===
- Marisol Aguilera (born 1971), researcher, professor
- Jacqueline Clarac de Briceño (1932–2023), anthropologist
- José Gregorio Hernández (1864–1919), physician
- José González-Lander (1933–2000), engineer, chief designer of the Caracas Metro
- Livia Gouverneur (1941–1961), murdered psychology student
- Alfredo Jahn (1867–1940), engineer, anthropologist.
- Manuel Núñez Tovar (1878–1925), naturalist, researcher, parasitologist and entomologist
- Luis Razetti (1862–1932), physician
- Rafael Villavicencio (1832–1920), physician

=== Politicians ===
- Carlos Benito Figueredo (1857–1935) journalist, politician and diplomat.
- Alexis Navarro (1946–2016), Governor of Nueva Esparta (2000–2004)
- Alfredo Peña (born 1944) journalist, member of the constituent assembly which drafted the 1999 Venezuelan Constitution and mayor of Caracas (2000).
- Teodoro Petkoff (born 1932) congressman, co-founder of the political party MAS and current chief editor of the newspaper "Tal Cual".
- Ali Rodriguez (born 1937) secretary-general of OPEC (2000) and chairman of Petroleos de Venezuela PDVSA.
- Hermann Escarrá (born 1952) member of the 2017 Constituent National Assembly.
- Irene Sáez (born 1961) mayor of Chacao, Governor of Nueva Esparta and Miss Universe 1981.
- Henrique Capriles (born 1972) former presidential candidate who has held many high offices
- Juan Requesens (born 1989) National Assembly deputy for the State of Táchira, Primero Justicia leader

=== Businessmen ===
- Lorenzo Mendoza Fleury (1897–1969) founder of Empresas Polar, a prize in his name honors scientific research.
- Carlos Eduardo Stolk (1912–1995) founding member and representative of the United Nations for Venezuela as well as president and chairman of the board of Empresas Polar.
- Eladio Lárez (born 1941) ex-president of Radio Caracas Television.
- Miguel Enrique Otero (born 1950) mathematician, (also faculty for five years) chairman and owner of the newspaper El Nacional.

=== Presidents of Venezuela ===
- José María Vargas, (also rector, faculty and alumnus) scientist (1835–36).
- Andrés Narvarte, lawyer (1836–37).
- Pedro Gual Escandon, lawyer (1859, 1861).
- Guillermo Tell Villegas, lawyer (1868–69, 1870, 1892).
- Guillermo Tell Villegas Pulido, lawyer (1892).
- Antonio Guzmán Blanco, lawyer (1879–1884).
- Raimundo Andueza Palacio, lawyer (1890–1892).
- José Gil Fortoul, political scientist (1913–1914).
- Juan Bautista Pérez, lawyer (1929–1931).
- Rómulo Betancourt, (did not finish) (1945–1948).
- Rómulo Gallegos, (did not finish) writer (1948).
- Germán Suárez Flamerich, (also Faculty) lawyer (1950–52).
- Edgar Sanabria, (also Faculty) lawyer (1959).
- Raúl Leoni, (did not finish) (1964–1969).
- Rafael Caldera, (also Faculty) political scientist (1969–1974), (1994–1999).
- Carlos Andrés Pérez, (did not finish) (1974–1979), (1989–1993).
- Luis Herrera Campins, (did not finish) (1979–1984).
- Jaime Lusinchi, physician (1984–1989).
- Ramón José Velásquez,(also Faculty) historian (1993–94).

=== Medicine ===
- Fernando Valarino Hernández, Phd in Medicine, Psychiatrist, President and Vice President of the Universidad Central de Venezuela (1984–1985)
- América González, (differed student)

== Notable faculty ==
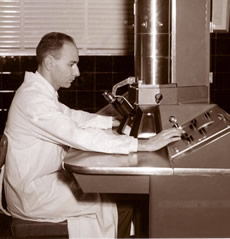
Humberto Fernández Morán

=== 18th century ===
- Lorenzo Campins y Ballester (1726–1785) Spanish born scientist, founder of the studies of medicine.
- Fr. Baltasar de los Reyes Marrero (1752–1809) (also alumnus) began the teaching of modern science and philosophy based on the theories of Newton, Kepler, Copernicus, Stahl, Lavoisier, Locke, Condillac, Leibniz and Wolff. In 1789 he was convicted by the Crown as an infidel for teaching doctrines forbidden by the King.

=== 19th century ===
- Juan Manuel Cagigal (1803–1856) mathematician.
- Alejandro Chataing (1873–1928) (also alumnus) mathematician, architect.
- Agustin Codazzi (1793–1859) Italian military, scientist and geographer
- Domenico Milano (1810–1880) Italian agronomist engineer, started in 1843 the Faculty of Agronomy ("Escuela Normal de Agricultura").
- Fermín Toro (1806–1865) politician and linguist.
- Alejandro Ibarra (1813–1880) scientist.
- José Gregorio Hernández (1864–1919) (also alumnus) physician, began the teaching of Microbiology in Venezuela.
- Adolf Ernst (1832–1899) Prussian born scientist, started the teaching of natural history based on Charles Darwin and Lamarck.
- Luis Razetti (1862–1932) (also alumnus) physician, began the teaching of modern surgery in Venezuela and wrote an influential code of ethics for the practice of medicine.

=== 20th century ===
==== Humanities ====
- Abraham Abreu (born 1939) pianist and harpsichordist.
- Mario Briceño Iragorry (1897–1958) writer.
- José Balza (born 1939) novelist, critic.
- Rafael Cadenas (born 1930) poet.
- Manuel Caballero (1931–2010) (also alumnus) historian, journalist.
- Alejo Carpentier (1904–1980) writer, musicologist, journalist.
- Isaac Chocrón (1930–2011) economist and theater writer. Director of the School of Arts.
- Nicolas Curiel (born 1931) writer and director of theater.
- Gustavo Herrera (1890–1953) lawyer and diplomat.
- Gaston Diehl (1912–1999) French art historian, recipient of the Academy Award for Live Action Short Film in 1950.
- Juan David García Bacca (1901–1992) Spanish born philosopher; translator of the complete works of Plato.
- Gertrude Goldschmidt (1912–1994) German born artist.
- Joaquín Gabaldón Márquez (1906–1984) lawyer and diplomat.
- Ezra Heymann (born 1928) Romanian born philosopher.
- Martha Hildebrandt (born 1925) Peruvian linguist.
- Chibly Abouhamad Hobaica (1929–2005) lawyer, professor and writer
- Eugenio Imaz (1900–1951) Spanish born philosopher.
- Pedro Itriago Chacín (1875–1936), lawyer, historian.
- Margarita López Maya, historian, humanist.
- Ernesto Mayz Vallenilla (1925–2015) (also alumnus) philosopher, rector of the Universidad Simón Bolívar.
- Juan Nuño (1927–1995) (also alumnus) Spanish born philosopher.
- Luis Enrique Oberto (1928–2022) (also alumnus) Venezuelan banker and politician.
- Manuel García Pelayo (1909–1991) Spanish born political Scientist, elected president of the Constitutional Tribunal of Spain in 1980.
- Manuel Pérez Vila (1922–1991) Spanish born historian.
- Pedro Antonio Ríos Reyna (1905–1971) classical musician.
- Federico Riu (1925–1985) (also alumnus) Spanish born philosopher.
- Angel Rosenblat (1902–1984) Polish born philologist.
- Levy Rossell (born 1945) writer and director of theater.
- Mariano Picón Salas (1901–1965) writer, cultural critic.
- José Antonio Ramos Sucre (1890–1930) (also alumnus) poet, writer.
- Oscar Sambrano Urdaneta (1929–2011) writer, essayist and literary critic.
- Guillermo Sucre (1933–2021) (also alumnus) literary critic.
- Arturo Uslar Pietri (1906–2001) (also alumnus) writer and historian, winner of the Prince of Asturias Award (1990) and Rómulo Gallegos Prize for Best Novel (1991).
- Carlos Raúl Villanueva (1900–1975) architect, one of the great Modernists.
- Guillermo Tell Villegas Pulido (also alumnus), politician, writer and historian.
- Pedro León Zapata (1929–2015) artist and humorist.

==== Sciences ====
- Arístides Bastidas (1924–1992) journalist and scientist winner of the Kalinga Prize, was one of the pioneers of what is termed as "science journalism" in Venezuela.
- German Carnevali Fernandez-Concha (born 1955) botanist.
- Luis Eduardo Chataing (1906–1971) (also alumnus) mathematician.
- Julian Chela-Flores (born 1942) astrobiologist and physicist.
- Jacqueline Clarac de Briceño (1932–2023) (also alumnus) anthropologist.
- Paul Dedecker (1927–2007) Belgian mathematician.
- Jacinto Convit (1913–2014) (also alumnus) nominated for the Nobel Prize in Medicine in 1988 for his research on the cure of Leprosy.
- Francisco José Duarte (1883–1972) mathematician.
- Humberto Fernández Morán (1924–1999) contributed to the development of the electron microscope and was the first researcher to introduce the concept of cryoultramicrotomy.
- Celso Fortoul Padrón (also alumnus) civil engineer and calculist of pre-tensate Infrastructures.
- Arnoldo Gabaldon (1909–1990) physician, started the fight over tropical diseases as Malaria.
- Luis Alfredo Herrera Cometta, relativistic physicist. Professor Emeritus.
- Andras Kalnay, physicist.
- Werner Jaffé (1914–2009) founder of the National Institute of Nutrition. Studied under Nobel prize winner Paul Karrer.
- Tobías Lasser (1911–2006) (also alumnus) botanist, founder of the Botanical Garden of Caracas, the modern School of Sciences and the Department of Biology.
- Fuad Lechín (born 1928) physician, nominated for the Nobel Prize in Medicine in 2001 for the development of new treatments of bronchial asthma and myasthenia.
- Antonio Machado-Allison (b. 1945) ichthyologist.
- Francisco Mago Leccia (1931–2004) ichthyologist.
- Rafael Martínez Escarbassiere (born 1929) biologist
- Ettore Mazzarri (1919–2009) chemist specialist of Maracay Agronomy faculty
- Angel Palacio Gros (1903–1965) Spanish mathematician.
- August Pi i Sunyer (1879–1961) Physiologist Spanish born. Winner of the Kalinga Prize 1956.
- Carles Pi i Sunyer (1888–1971) Spanish born industrial engineer and literate
- Janis Rácenis (1915–1980) Latvia born entomologist.
- Ivón Mercedes Ramírez Morillo (born 1965) botanist.
- Gustavo Adolfo Romero-Gonzales (born 1955) botanist.
- Eckbert Schulz-Schomburgk (born 1921) chemist.
- Gustavo Rivas Mijares, sanitarist engineer.
- Marcel Roche (1920–2003) physician, winner of the Kalinga Prize, governor of the International Atomic Energy Agency (1958–1960) and founding member Third World Academy of Sciences.
- José Royo Gómez (1895–1961) Spanish geologist.
- Carlos Toro Manrique (1868–1937) (also alumnus) engineer, mathematician.
- Elías Toro (1871–1918) physician, anthropologist.
- Andre Zavrosky (1904–1995) Russian mathematician.

== Rectors ==
=== 18th century ===
- Francisco Martínez de Porras (1725–1732)
- José Ignacio Mijares de Solórzano (1732–1734)
- Gerónimo de Rada (1734–1739)
- Carlos Francisco de Herrera (1739–1740)
- Blas Arraéz de Mendoza (1740–1741)
- Juan Pérez Hurtado (1741–1744)
- Bonifacio de Frías Abadino (1744–1746)
- Gabriel Ramón de Ibarra (1746–1749)
- Carlos Francisco de Herrera (1749–1758)
- Francisco de Ibarra (1758–1771)
- Bartolome Antonio de Vargas (1771–1772)
- Domingo de Berroterán (1772–1785)
- José Domingo Blanco (1785–1787)
- José Ignacio Romero (1787–1789)
- Juan Agustín de la Torre (1789–1791)
- Domingo Rogerio Briceño (1791–1793)
- José Antonio Osío (1793–1794)
- Tomás Hernández Sanabria (1794–1795)
- Juan Vicente Echevarría (1795–1797)
- José Antonio Felipe Borges (1797–1799)
- José Vicente Machillanda (1799–1801)

=== 19th century ===
- Domingo Gómez de Rus (1801–1803)
- Nicolás Antonio Osío (1803–1805)
- José Bernabé Díaz (1805–1807)
- Gabriel José Lindo (1807–1809)
- Tomás Hernández Sanabria (1809–1811)
- Manuel Vicente Maya (1811–1815)
- Juan de Rojas Queipo (1815–1817)
- Pablo Antonio Romero (1817–1819)
- José Manuel Oropeza (1819–1821)
- Miguel Castro y Marrón (1821–1823)
- Felipe Fermín Paul (1823–1825)
- José Cecilio Avila (1825–1827)
- José María Vargas (1827–1829)
- José Nicolás Díaz (1829–1832)
- Andrés Navarte (1832–1835)
- Juan Hilario Bosett (1835–1838)
- Tomás José Sanabria (1838–1841)
- José Alberto Espinosa (1841–1843)
- Domingo Quintero (1843–1846)
- Carlos Arvelo (1846–1849)
- Tomás José Sanabria (1849–1850)
- José Manuel García (1850–1852)
- Antonio José Rodríguez (1852–1855)
- Guillermo Michelena (1855–1858)
- Francisco Díaz Flores (1858–1860)
- Nicanor Borges (1860–1862)
- Elias Acosta (1862)
- Calixto Madrid (1862–1863)
- José Manuel García (1863–1868)
- Nicanor Borges (1868–1869)
- Carlos Arvelo, jr. (1869–1870)
- Alejandro Ibarra (1870–1873)
- Pedro Medina (1873–1876)
- Antonio Guzmán Blanco (1876–1877)
- Raimundo Andueza (1877–1879)
- Angel Rivas Baldwin (1879–1882)
- Jesús María Blanco Arnal (1882–1883)
- Manuel María Ponte (1883–1884)
- Aníbal Dominici (1884–1886)
- Ezequiel Jelambi (1886)
- Andrés A. Silva (1886–1887)
- Jesús Muñoz Tébar (1887)
- Aníbal Dominici (1887–1888)
- Martin J. Sanabria (1888–1889)
- Agustín Astúriz (1899–1890)
- Elías Rodríguez (1890–1895)
- Manuel Clemente Urbaneja (1895)
- Rafel Villacencio (1895–1897)
- Alberto Smith (1897–1898)
- Rafel Villacencio (1898–1899)

=== 20th century ===
- Santos Aníbal Dominici (1899–1901)
- José Antonio Baldó (1901–1905)
- Laureano Villanueva (1905–1906)
- Jesús Muñoz Tébar (1906–1908)
- Luis Razetti (1908)
- Elías Toro (1908–1910)
- Alejo Zuloaga Egusquiza (1910–1911)
- Alberto Smith (1911)
- Manuel Angel Dagnino (1911)
- Alberto Smith (1911–1912)
- Manuel Angel Dagnino (1912)
- Felipe Guevara Rojas (1912)
- David Lobo Senior (1922–1924)
- Alejandro Urbaneja (1924–1925)
- Diego Carbonell (1925–1928)
- Juan Iturbe (1928)
- Plácido D. Rodríguez Rivero (1928–1935)
- Francisco Antonio Rísquez (1935–1936)
- Alberto Smith (1936)
- Salvador Córdova (1936–1937)
- Antonio José Castillo (1937–1943)
- Rafael Pizani (1943–1944)
- Leopoldo García Maldonado (1944–1945)
- Juan Oropeza (1945–1946)
- Santiago Vera Izquierdo (1946–1948)
- Julio De Armas (1948–1951)
- Eloy Dávila Celis (1951)
- Julio García Alvarez (1951–1953)
- Pedro González Rincones (1953–1956)
- Emilio Espósito Jiménez (1956–1958)
- Francisco De Venanzi (1958–1963)
- Jesús María Bianco (1963–1970)
- Rafael Clemente Arraíz (1971)
- Oswaldo De Sola (1971–1972)
- Rafael José Neri (1972–1976)
- Miguel Layrisse (1976–1980)
- Carlos A. Moro Guersi (1980–1984)
- Edmundo Chirinos (1984–1988)
- Fernando Valarino Hernández (1984)
- Luis Fuenmayor Toro (1988–1992)
- Simón Muñoz (1992–1996)
- Trino Alcides Díaz (1996–2000)

=== 21st century ===
- Giuseppe Gianetto (2000–2004)
- Antonio París (2004–2008)
- Cecilia García Arocha (2008-2023)
- Víctor Rago Albujas (since 2023)

== Saber UCV ==
Saber UCV is the institutional repository of the university. It provides open-access to the intellectual output of the university and hosts several academic journals, usually licensed under Creative Commons CC-BY-NC-ND. It makes use of the Open Journal Systems.

== See also ==
- Central University of Venezuela rectorate takeover
- Tazón massacre
- Operación Canguro
- Education in Venezuela
- List of universities in Venezuela
- List of colonial universities in Latin America

== Aerial photos ==
- Aerial Photo from GoogleMaps
- The UCV is located at 10.4884°N 66.8907°W
