= Juan Nuño =

Venezuelan writer and philosopher (1927–1995)

Juan Antonio Nuño Montes
- Born: 27 March 1927; Madrid, Spain
- Died: 5 May 1995 (aged 68); Caracas, Venezuela
- Occupations: Philosopher, writer, art critic

Juan Antonio Nuño Montes (27 March 1927 – 5 May 1995) was a philosopher, writer and university professor.

== Career ==
After leaving Spain in 1947, Nuño settled in Venezuela where he studied philosophy at the Central University of Venezuela. In 1951 he studied at the University of Cambridge and the University of Paris. In 1962 he finished his doctoral degree under Juan David García Bacca at the Central University of Venezuela and spent a year in Switzerland studying with Józef Maria Bocheński. He was the chair of the Instituto de Filosofía de la UCV from 1975 to 1979. In 1976 he became a member of the International Institute of Philosophy of Unesco (París). He taught at the Universidad Complutense, University of Barcelona, University of Puerto Rico, Rio Piedras Campus, San Marcos University and the UNAM, where he founded the journal Crítica of the Instituto de investigaciones Filosóficas.

== Works ==
- La filosofía en Borges (México: FCE, 1986) ISBN 978-84-933921-7-8
- El pensamiento de Platón (México, FCE 2007) ISBN 978-84-375-0609-8
- Los mitos filosóficos (México: Fondo de Cultura Económica, 1985)
- Sionismo, marxismo, antisemitismo : la cuestión judía revisitada (Caracas: Monte Ávila, 1987) ISBN 978-980-01-0182-7
- La veneración de las astucias (Caracas: Monte Ávila, 1989)
- La escuela de la sospecha: Nuevos ensayos polémicos (Caracas: Monte Avila, 1990) ISBN 978-980-01-0326-5
- Fin de siglo (México: Fondo de Cultura Económica, 1991)
- Escuchar con los ojos (Caracas: Monte Avila, 1993) ISBN 978-980-01-0762-1
- Ética y. cibernética: ensayos filosóficos (Caracas: Monte Ávila Latinoamericana, 1994)
