= List of bridges in Venezuela =

== Historical or architectural interest bridges ==
	Name	Distinction	Length	Type	Carries Crosses	Opened	Location	State	Ref.
1	Carlos III Bridge	National historic monument		Masonry; 1 semi-circular arch	Road bridge Avenida Oeste 13; Río Catuche	1784	Caracas (La Pastora Parish); 10°30′57.3″N 66°55′3.5″W	Capital District	
2	Anauco Bridge	National historic monument		Masonry; 3 elliptic arches	Road bridge Avenida Este 0 Río Anauco; Paseo Anauco	1790	Caracas (La Candelaria Parish); 10°30′16″N 66°54′10.9″W	Capital District	
3	María Nieves Bridge	National historic monument		Truss; Steel; Transporter bridge	Troncal 2 Apure River	1962; 2016	San Fernando de Apure–Puerto Miranda; 7°54′02.6″N 67°28′25.0″W	Apure; Guárico	(Note: Originally built as a concrete girder bridge, it was converted as a lift bridge in 2012 to allow higher navigational clearance.)
4	Niquitao Viaduct		99 m (325 ft)	Arch; Steel deck arch	Road bridge Quebrada el Molino	1991	Niquitao; 9°05′49.9″N 70°24′27.8″W	Trujillo	

== Major bridges ==
This table presents a non-exhaustive list of the road and railway bridges with spans greater than 100 metres (328 ft).

	Name	Span	Length	Structural type	Carries Crosses	Opened	Location	State	Ref.
1	Angostura Bridge	712 m (2,336 ft)	1,678 m (5,505 ft)	Suspension; Steel truss deck, steel pylons 280+712+280	Troncal 16; Orinoco	1967	Ciudad Bolívar; 8°8′40.5″N 63°35′53.6″W	Bolívar; Anzoátegui	
2	Nigale Bridge planned	430 m (1,410 ft)	11,200 m (36,700 ft)	Cable-stayed; Concrete deck and pylons Railroad bridge	Road bridge Railway line Lake Maracaibo; Tablazo Strait		Santa Cruz de Mara–Sabaneta de Palmas; 10°47′51.5″N 71°36′36.2″W	Zulia	
3	Third Orinoco River Bridge under construction	360 m (1,180 ft)	11,125 m (36,499 ft)	Cable-stayed; 2 levels steel truss deck, concrete pylons Railroad bridge 2x120+360+2x120	Troncal 12; Railway line Orinoco		Caicara del Orinoco; 7°40′23″N 66°9′15.1″W	Bolívar; Guárico	(Note: Also called Mercosur Bridge.)
4	Orinoquia Bridge	300 m (980 ft)(x2)	3,156 m (10,354 ft)	Cable-stayed; Steel box girder deck, concrete pylons Railroad bridge 3x60+300+4x60 +300+3x60	Road bridge Railway line Orinoco	2006	Ciudad Guayana; 8°16′29.9″N 62°53′58.1″W	Bolívar; Anzoátegui	
5	General Rafael Urdaneta Bridge	235 m (771 ft)(x5)	8,678 m (28,471 ft)	Cable-stayed; Concrete deck and cable-stays, 6 concrete pylons 160+5x235+160	Troncal 3 Troncal 17; Lake Maracaibo; Tablazo Strait	1962	Maracaibo; 10°34′28.1″N 71°35′30.9″W	Zulia	
6	Second Chama River Bridge	176 m (577 ft)(x2)	528 m (1,732 ft)	Box girder Prestressed concrete 88+2x176+88	Road bridge Chama River	2022	El Vigia; 8°38′19.3″N 71°38′32.9″W	Mérida	
7	Caracas-La Guaira Bridge I collapsed in 2006	152 m (499 ft)	309 m (1,014 ft)	Arch; Concrete deck arch	Caracas-La Guaira highway	1953	Caracas; 10°31′27.2″N 66°58′10.5″W	Capital District	
8	Caracas-La Guaira Bridge II	146 m (479 ft)	253 m (830 ft)	Arch; Concrete deck arch	Caracas-La Guaira highway Quebrada Tacagua	1953	Caracas; 10°32′42.5″N 66°59′58.9″W	Capital District	
9	Tienditas Bridge	140 m (460 ft)	280 m (920 ft)	Box girder Prestressed concrete 70+140+70	Road Bridge; Footbridge; Táchira River	2016	Tienditas–Cúcuta; 7°52′36.0″N 72°27′10.5″W	Táchira; Bolivia	
10	Caracas-La Guaira Bridge III	138 m (453 ft)	213 m (699 ft)	Arch; Concrete deck arch	Caracas-La Guaira highway Quebrada Tacagua	1953	Caracas; 10°33′10.1″N 67°0′18.1″W	Capital District	
11	Guárico River Suspension Bridge dismantled in 1957	125 m (410 ft)	213 m (699 ft)	Suspension; Steel truss deck, steel pylons	Guárico River	1930	El Sombrero	Guárico	(Note: The Guárico River Suspension Bridge was dismantled in 1957 and rebuilt over the Cuyuni River.)
12	Cuyuni River Suspension Bridge closed	125 m (410 ft)	213 m (699 ft)	Suspension; Steel truss deck, steel pylons	Troncal 10; Cuyuni River	1957	El Dorado; 6°42′56.1″N 61°36′37.8″W	Bolívar	
13	Libertador Bridge	113 m (371 ft)	173 m (568 ft)	Suspension; Concrete deck, steel pylons 30+113+30	Road bridge Torbes River	1930	San Cristóbal–Táriba; 7°48′36.5″N 72°13′56.4″W	Táchira	
14	Chama River Bridge	112 m (367 ft)(x5)	630 m (2,070 ft)	Arch; Steel truss deck arch	Troncal 1 Pan-American Highway; Chama River	1954	El Vigia; 8°36′37.8″N 71°37′54.1″W	Mérida	
15	General José Antonio Páez Bridge	110 m (360 ft)	286 m (938 ft)	Truss; Steel	Troncal 5 Bocono River	1952	Boconoíto–Veguitas, 8°50′56.9″N 70°00′49.1″W	Portuguesa; Barinas	
16	New Caracas-La Guaira Bridge I	110 m (360 ft)(x6)	803 m (2,635 ft)	Beam bridge Composite steel/concrete deck 78+6x110+65	Caracas-La Guaira highway	2007	Caracas; 10°31′28.7″N 66°57′57.8″W	Capital District	
17	José Cornelio Muñoz Bridge			Suspension; Steel truss deck, steel pylons	Apure River		Bruzual; 8°3′13.9″N 69°19′59.2″W	Apure; Barinas	

== See also ==
- Transport in Venezuela
- Rail transport in Venezuela
- Geography of Venezuela
- List of rivers of Venezuela
- es:Carreteras de Venezuela (in Spanish) - Roads in Venezuela
