= Fort Tiuna =

Military fortification in Caracas, Venezuela

Coordinates: 10°26′27.01″N 66°54′32.6″W

- Caracas; Venezuela
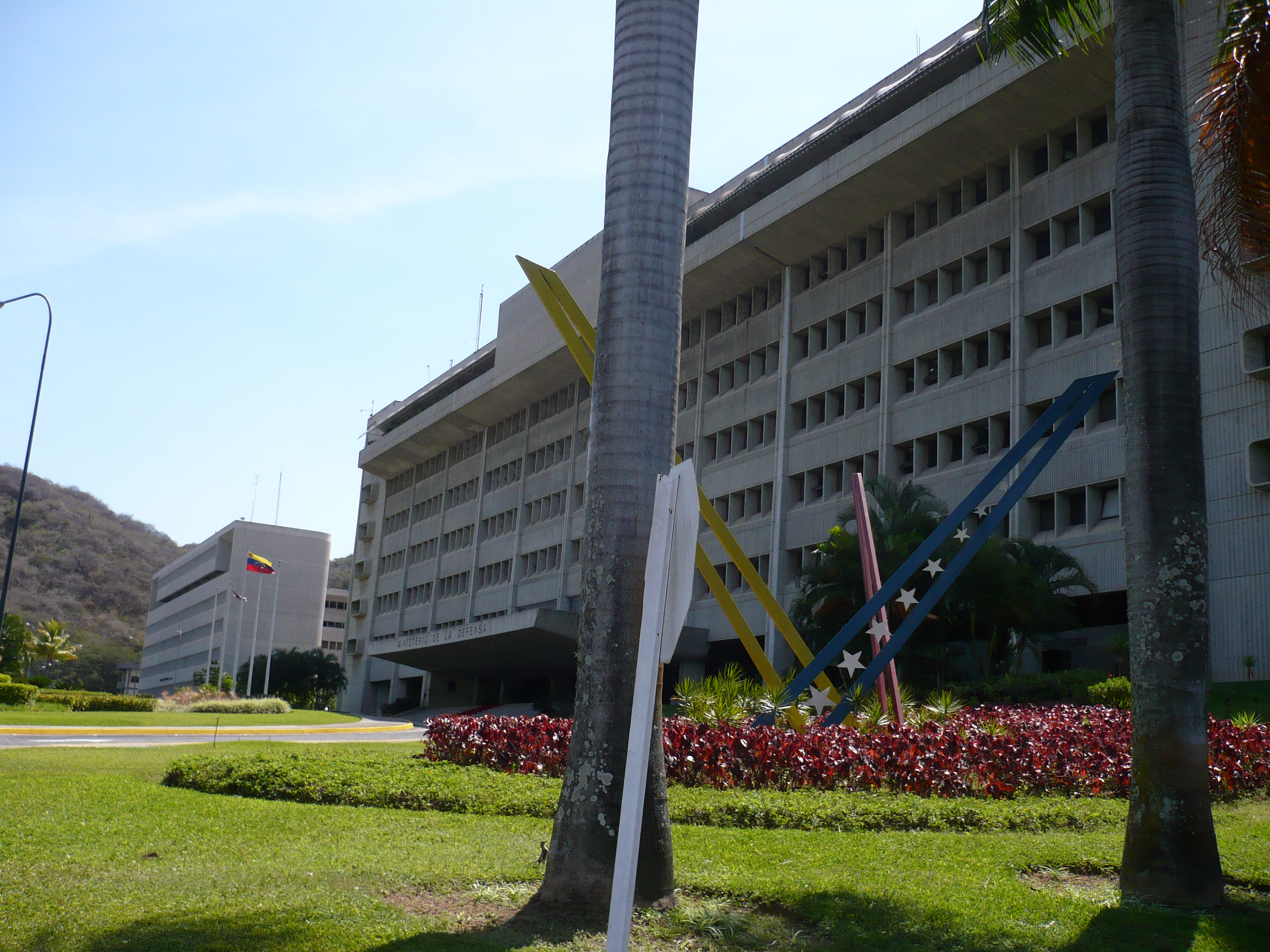
- The headquarters of the Ministry of Defense, Fort Tiuna

Site information
- Type: Military installation
- Open to the public: Partially

Location
- Area: Coche and El Valle Parish, Libertador Municipality

Fuerte Tiuna or Fort Tiuna (more formally the Military Complex of Fort Tiuna) is a military installation in Caracas, Venezuela.

== Fort ==
There are important institutions of various types, such as the headquarters of the Ministry of Popular Power for Defense, the Escuela de Formación de Oficiales de las Fuerzas Armadas de Cooperación (EFOFAC), The General Command of the Army, El Libertador Shooting Range, the Army Food Center, the Caracas Military Circle, Paseo Los Próceres, the Bolívar Battalion, the Ayala Battalion, La Viñeta, which is the official residence of the vice president, and some units of the Venezuelan Military Academy.

It is located between Coche and El Valle parishes, both south of the Libertador Municipality and southwest of the Caracas Metropolitan District, to the north center of Venezuela.

It houses military structures and sports, urban, cultural, financial spaces. The Tiuna City complex is thousands of homes built by the Ministry of Habitat and Housing and Residences, and assigned to military personnel.

It is bordered largely by the Regional Highway of the Center and the Valle Coche Highway.

It was struck in the 2026 United States intervention in Venezuela among other targets, such as Generalissimo Francisco de Miranda Air Base. The strike prompted an evacuation of the base. Both then-president Nicolás Maduro and then-first lady Cilia Flores were captured by the US military's Delta Force at the facility. They were extracted from the country and taken to USS Iwo Jima, before being transported to Guantanamo, before finally being taken by plane to New York City to face trial.

== Gallery ==
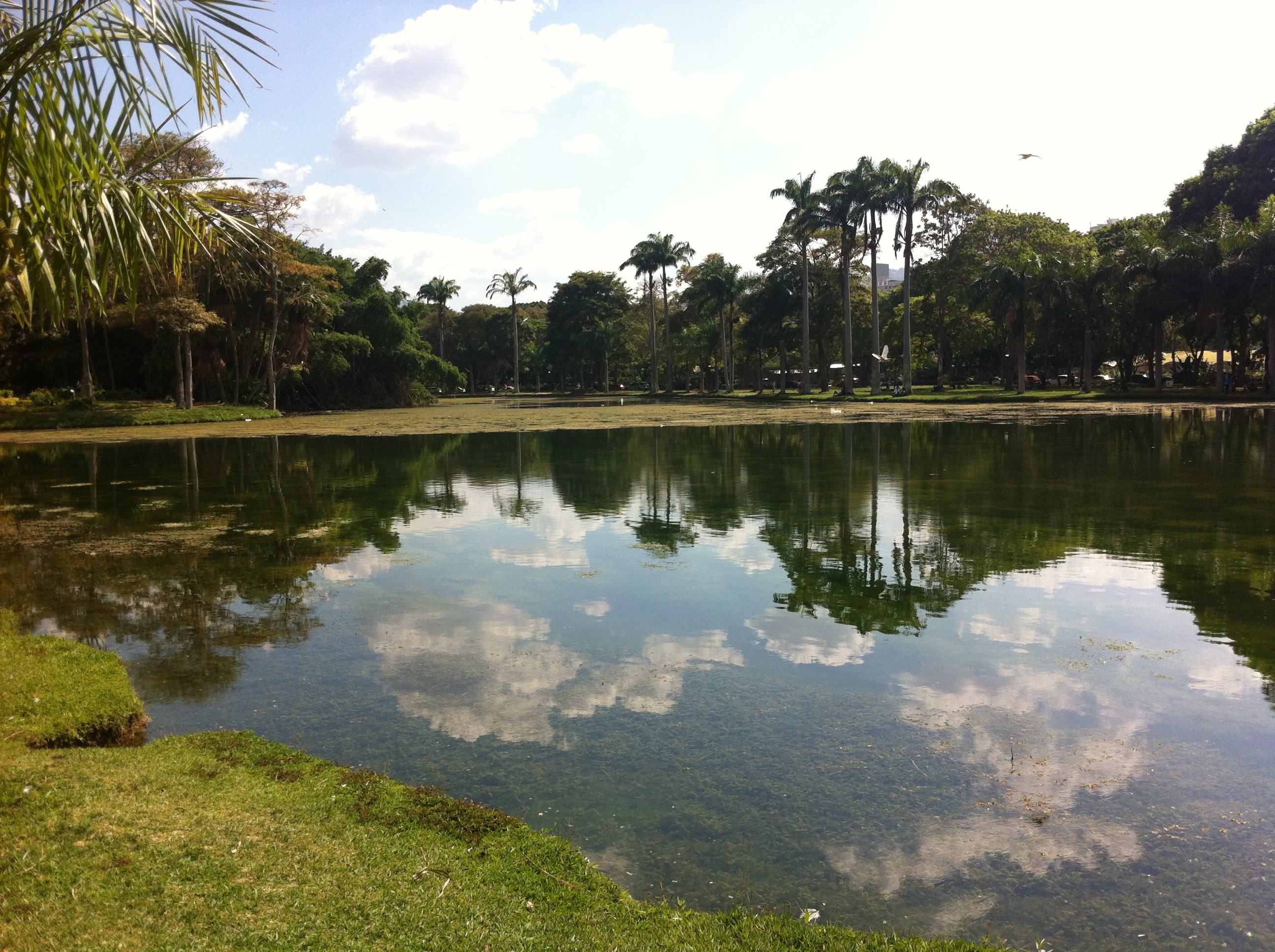
Fort Tiuna Lagoon Caracas

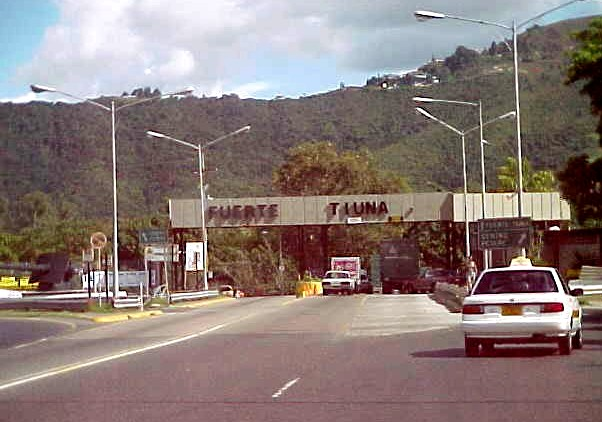
One of the entrances to Fort Tiuna

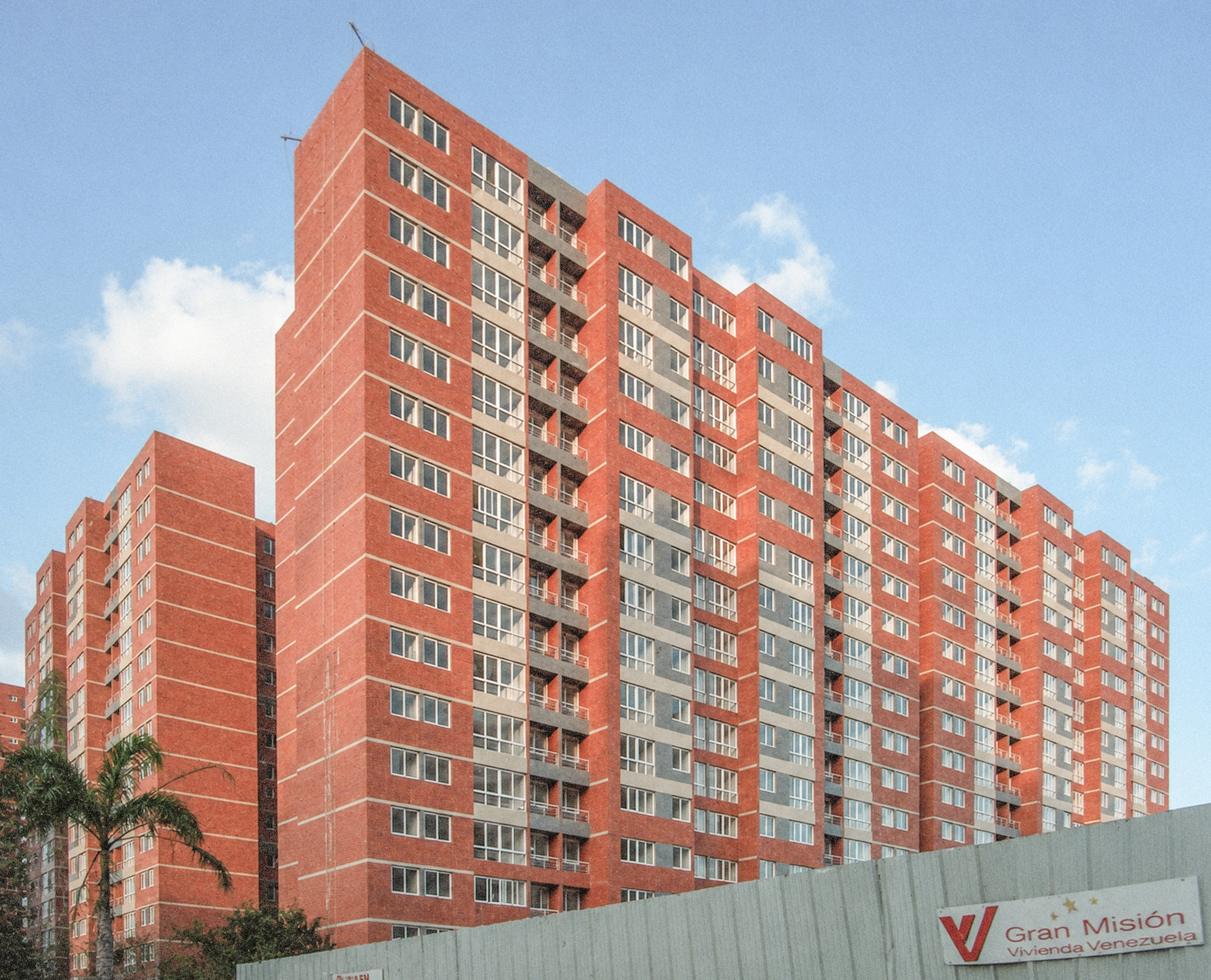
Tiuna City, housing complex

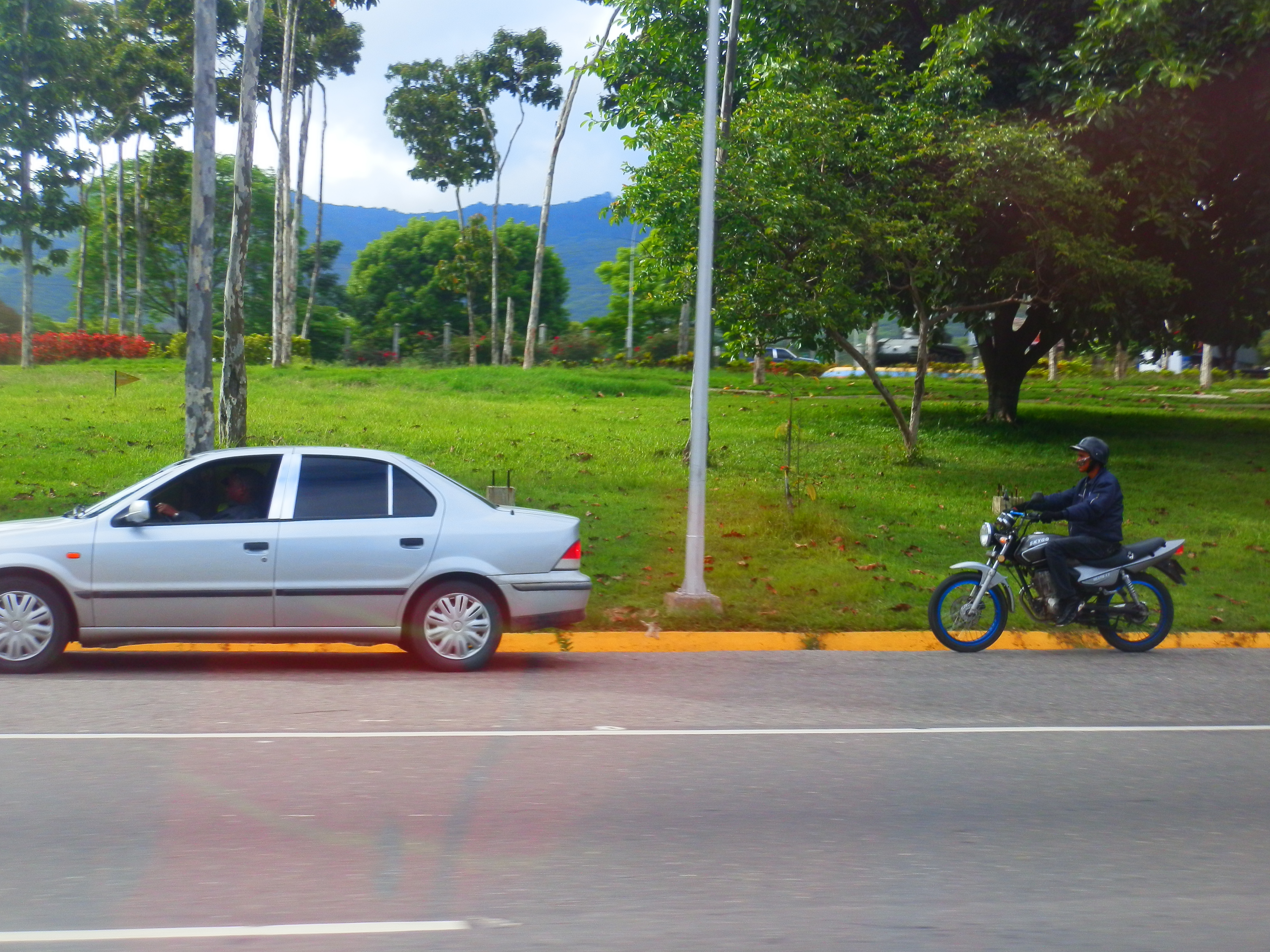
Parks on the Valle-Coche motorway, at the height of Fort Tiuna

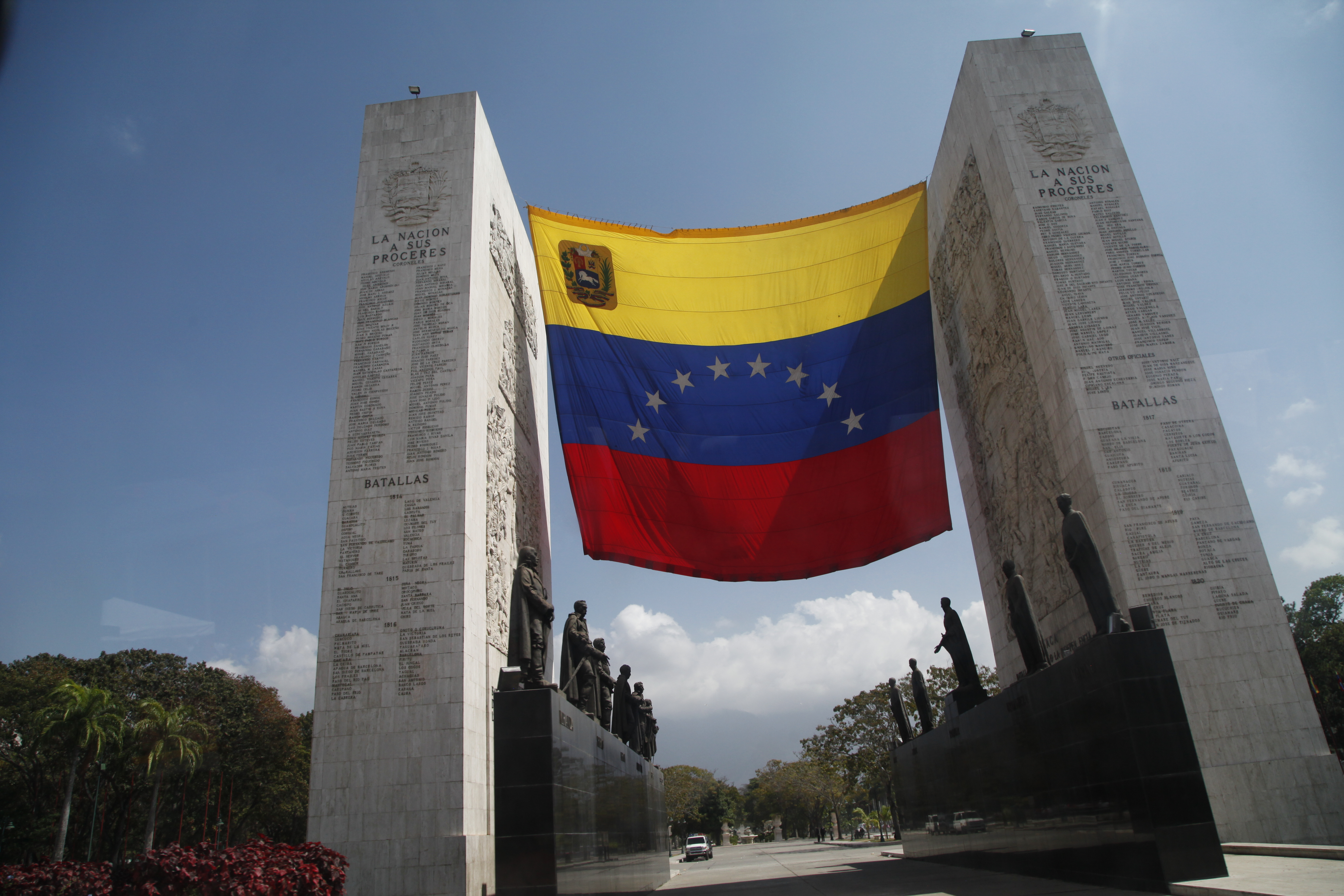
Paseo Los Próceres, Fort Tiuna

== See also ==
- History of Venezuela
- National Bolivarian Armed Forces of Venezuela
- National Experimental University of the Armed Forces
