= San Bernardino Parish =

- Parish
- Country: Venezuela
- Federal district: Distrito Capital
- Municipality: Libertador

Area
  - Total: 12.27 km^{2} (4.74 sq mi)

Population (2009)
  - Total: 26,226
  - Density: 2,137/km^{2} (5,536/sq mi)

San Bernardino is a residential neighbourhood of the Venezuelan municipality Libertador of Caracas, and one of its 32 parishes.

Although it is mostly a middle class residential neighbourhood, San Bernardino also holds the headquarters of Banco Mercantil, Banco Venezolano de Crédito, Corpoelec, and Centro Financiero Confinanzas.

The Quinta de Anauco, which houses the Caracas Museum of Colonial Art, can also be found in San Bernardino.
