= Santa Teresa Parish =

Santa Teresa
- Parish
- Country: Venezuela
- Federal district: Distrito Capital
- Municipality: Libertador

Area
  - Total: 0.8 km^{2} (0.31 sq mi)

Population (2011)
  - Total: 45,000
  - Density: 56,000/km^{2} (150,000/sq mi)

Santa Teresa is one of the 22 parishes located in the Libertador Bolivarian Municipality and one of 32 of Caracas, Venezuela.
