= San Pedro Parish =

San Pedro
- Parish
- Country: Venezuela
- Federal district: Distrito Capital
- Municipality: Libertador

Area
  - Total: 6.7 km^{2} (2.6 sq mi)

Population (2011)
  - Total: 82,000
  - Density: 12,000/km^{2} (32,000/sq mi)

San Pedro is one of the 22 parishes located in the Libertador Bolivarian Municipality and one of 32 of Caracas, Venezuela.
