= San José Parish =

San José
- Parish
- Country: Venezuela
- Federal district: Distrito Capital
- Municipality: Libertador

Area
  - Total: 2.6 km^{2} (1.0 sq mi)

Population (2011)
  - Total: 59,980
  - Density: 23,000/km^{2} (60,000/sq mi)

San José is one of the 22 parishes located in the Libertador Bolivarian Municipality and one of 32 of Caracas, Venezuela.
