= San Juan Parish =

San Juan
- Parish
- Country: Venezuela
- Federal district: Distrito Capital
- Municipality: Libertador

Area
  - Total: 3.8 km^{2} (1.5 sq mi)

Population (2011)
  - Total: 177,947
  - Density: 47,000/km^{2} (120,000/sq mi)

San Juan is one of the 22 parishes located in the Libertador Bolivarian Municipality and one of 31 of Caracas, Venezuela.
