= San Agustín Parish =

San Agustín
- Parish
- Country: Venezuela
- Federal district: Distrito Capital
- Municipality: Libertador

Area
  - Total: 1.7 km^{2} (0.66 sq mi)

Population (2011)
  - Total: 83,200
  - Density: 49,000/km^{2} (130,000/sq mi)

San Agustín is one of the 22 parishes located in the Libertador Bolivarian Municipality and one of 32 of Caracas, Venezuela.

== Notable people ==
- Livia Gouverneur
