= Macarao =

- Parish
- Macarao as seen located in the Libertador municipality.
- Country: Venezuela
- Federal district: Distrito Capital
- Municipality: Libertador

Area
  - Land: 10.25 km^{2} (3.96 sq mi)

Population (2011)
  - Total: 70,217
  - Density: 6,850/km^{2} (17,740/sq mi)

Macarao is a parish located in the Libertador Bolivarian Municipality, southwest of the city of Caracas, Venezuela.
