= January 8 =

January 8 this year in various calendars
- Thursday, 8 January 2026
Akan	Kuruyaw
Armenian	22 Arach 1475
Aztec	Huei Tozoztli 18, 12 Miquiztli
Babylonian	18 Kislimu, 2336 SE
Balinese pawukon	Menga, Pasah, Laba, Keliwon, Paniron, Wraspati of Merakih, Indra, Nohan, Manusa
Bengali	24 Poush, BS 1432
Chinese	Yang Water Horse・Horn Mansion; Wood Snake Year, Month 11, Day 20 (Xiaohan, 12 days until Dahan)
Common Era	8 January 2026 CE
Coptic	30 Koiak, AM 1742
Egyptian	27 Pachon, 2774 NE
Ethiopian	30 Tākḫśāś, 2018 Amätä Məhrät
French Republican	Décade II, Nonidi de Nivôse de l'Année 234 de la République
Gregorian	8 January, AD 2026
Hebrew	19 Tevet, AM 5786
Hindu	Pūrvaphalgunī・Saubhāgya; Solar: 24 Pauṣa, 1947 SE; Lunisolar: Pañcamī, Kṛishna pakṣa of Pauṣa, 2082 VE; Siddhārthin・5126 KY・1,872,583
Icelandic	Fimmtudagur, 16 Mörsugur 2025
Islamic	19 Rajab, AH 1447 (using tabular method)
ISO week date	2026-W02-4
Japanese	20 Shimotsuki, Reiwa 8 (Shōkan, 12 days until Daikan)
Julian	26 December, AD 2025 (AM 7535)
Julian day	2461049
Korean	20 Jwidal, 4358 DE
Maya	13.0.13.4.6; 4 Muan, 12 Cimi
Roman	ante diem VII Kalendas Ianuarias, MMDCCLXXIX AUC
Solar Hijri	18 Dey, SH 1404
Tibetan	20 mgo, shing mo sbrul 2152 or 1771 or 999

<<	January					>>
Su	Mo	Tu	We	Th	Fr	Sa
				1	2	3
4	5	6	7	8	9	10
11	12	13	14	15	16	17
18	19	20	21	22	23	24
25	26	27	28	29	30	31
2026

January 8 in recent years
2026 (Thursday)
2025 (Wednesday)
2024 (Monday)
2023 (Sunday)
2022 (Saturday)
2021 (Friday)
2020 (Wednesday)
2019 (Tuesday)
2018 (Monday)
2017 (Sunday)

January 8 is the eighth day of the year in the Gregorian calendar; 357 days remain until the end of the year (358 in leap years).

== Events ==
=== Pre-1600 ===
- 307 – Sima Chi becomes emperor of the Jin dynasty in succession to his brother, Sima Zhong, despite a challenge from his other brother, Sima Ying.
- 871 – Æthelred I and Alfred the Great lead a West Saxon army to repel an invasion by Danelaw Vikings.
- 1297 – François Grimaldi, disguised as a monk, leads his men to capture the fortress protecting the Rock of Monaco, establishing his family as the rulers of Monaco.
- 1454 – The papal bull Romanus Pontifex awards the Kingdom of Portugal exclusive trade and colonization rights to all of Africa south of Cape Bojador.
- 1499 – Louis XII of France marries Anne of Brittany in accordance with a law set by his predecessor, Charles VIII.
- 1547 – The first Lithuanian-language book, the Catechism of Martynas Mažvydas, is published in Königsberg.

=== 1601–1900 ===
- 1735 – The premiere of George Frideric Handel's Ariodante takes place at the Royal Opera House, Covent Garden.
- 1746 – Second Jacobite rising: Bonnie Prince Charlie occupies Stirling.
- 1790 – George Washington delivers the first State of the Union address in New York City.
- 1806 – The Dutch Cape Colony in southern Africa becomes the British Cape Colony as a result of the Battle of Blaauwberg.
- 1811 – Charles Deslondes leads an unsuccessful slave revolt in the North American settlements of St. Charles and St. James, Louisiana.
- 1815 – War of 1812: Battle of New Orleans: Andrew Jackson leads American forces in victory over the British.
- 1828 – The Democratic Party of the United States is organized.
- 1835 – US President Andrew Jackson announces a celebratory dinner after having reduced the United States national debt to zero for the only time.
- 1863 – American Civil War: Second Battle of Springfield.
- 1867 – The United States Congress passes the bill to allow African American men the right to vote in Washington, D.C.
- 1877 – Crazy Horse and his warriors fight their last battle against the United States Cavalry at Wolf Mountain, Montana Territory.
- 1889 – Herman Hollerith is issued US patent #395,791 for the 'Art of Applying Statistics' — his punched card calculator.
- 1900 – President William McKinley places Alaska under military rule.

=== 1901–present ===
- 1912 – The African National Congress is founded, under the name South African Native National Congress (SANNC).
- 1912 – The city of San Diego passes an ordinance restricting free speech, provoking months of civil unrest between socialist Wobblies and business leaders that become the bloodiest free speech fight in history.
- 1918 – U.S. President Woodrow Wilson announces his "Fourteen Points" as conditions for ending World War I.
- 1920 – The steel strike of 1919 ends in failure for the Amalgamated Association of Iron, Steel and Tin Workers labor union.
- 1926 – Crown Prince Nguyễn Phúc Vĩnh Thuỵ is crowned emperor of Vietnam, the country's last monarch.
- 1926 – Abdul-Aziz ibn Saud is crowned King of Hejaz.
- 1928 – The Committee for Union Action is established in Guatemala.
- 1933 – Anarchist insurrection of January 1933 breaks out in Barcelona, Spain.
- 1936 – Kashf-e hijab decree is made and immediately enforced by Reza Shah, Iran's head of state, banning the wearing of Islamic veils in public.
- 1940 – World War II: Britain introduces food rationing.
- 1945 – World War II: Philippine Commonwealth troops under the Philippine Commonwealth Army units enter the province of Ilocos Sur in Northern Luzon and attack invading Japanese Imperial forces.
- 1946 – Andrei Zhdanov, Chairman of the Finnish Allied Commission, submits to the Finnish War Criminal Court an interrogation report by General Erich Buschenhagen, a German prisoner of war, on the contacts between Finnish and German military personnel before the Continuation War and a copy of Hitler's Barbarossa plan.
- 1956 – Operation Auca: Five U.S. missionaries are killed by the Waorani of Ecuador shortly after making first contact.
- 1959 – Charles de Gaulle is proclaimed as the first President of the French Fifth Republic.
- 1961 – In France a referendum supports Charles de Gaulle's policies in Algeria.
- 1964 – President Lyndon B. Johnson declares a "War on Poverty" in the United States.
- 1972 – Bowing to international pressure, President of Pakistan Zulfikar Ali Bhutto releases Bengali leader Sheikh Mujibur Rahman from prison, who had been arrested after declaring the independence of Bangladesh.
- 1973 – Soviet space mission Luna 21 is launched.
- 1973 – Watergate scandal: The trial of seven men accused of illegal entry into Democratic Party headquarters at Watergate begins.
- 1975 – Ella T. Grasso becomes Governor of Connecticut, the first woman to serve as a governor in the United States other than by succeeding her husband.
- 1977 – Three bombs explode in Moscow, Russia, Soviet Union, within 37 minutes, killing seven. The bombings are attributed to an Armenian separatist group.
- 1981 – A local farmer reports a UFO sighting in Trans-en-Provence, France, claimed to be "perhaps the most completely and carefully documented sighting of all time".
- 1982 – Breakup of the Bell System: In the United States, AT&T agrees to divest itself of twenty-two subdivisions.
- 1989 – Kegworth air disaster: British Midland Flight 92, a Boeing 737-400, crashes into the M1 motorway, killing 47 of the 126 people on board.
- 1994 – Russian cosmonaut Valeri Polyakov on Soyuz TM-18 leaves for Mir. He would stay on the space station until March 22, 1995, for a record 437 days in space.
- 1996 – An Antonov An-32 cargo aircraft crashes into a crowded market in Kinshasa, Zaire, killing up to 223 people on the ground; two of six crew members are also killed.
- 2002 – President of the United States George W. Bush signs into law the No Child Left Behind Act.
- 2003 – Turkish Airlines Flight 634 crashes near Diyarbakır Airport, Turkey, killing the entire crew and 70 of the 75 passengers.
- 2003 – Air Midwest Flight 5481 crashes at Charlotte-Douglas Airport, in Charlotte, North Carolina, killing all 21 people on board.
- 2004 – The RMS Queen Mary 2, then the largest ocean liner ever built, is christened by her namesake's granddaughter, Queen Elizabeth II.
- 2005 – The nuclear sub USS San Francisco collides at full speed with an undersea mountain south of Guam. One man is killed, but the sub surfaces and is repaired.
- 2009 – A 6.1-magnitude earthquake in northern Costa Rica kills 15 people and injures 32.
- 2010 – Gunmen from an offshoot of the Front for the Liberation of the Enclave of Cabinda attack a bus carrying the Togo national football team on its way to the 2010 Africa Cup of Nations, killing three people and injuring another nine.
- 2011 – Sitting US Congresswoman Gabby Giffords is shot in the head along with 18 others in a mass shooting in Tucson, Arizona. Giffords survived the assassination attempt, but six others died, including John Roll, a federal judge.
- 2016 – Joaquín Guzmán, widely regarded as the world's most powerful drug trafficker, is recaptured following his escape from a maximum security prison in Mexico.
- 2016 – West Air Sweden Flight 294 crashes near the Swedish reservoir of Akkajaure; both pilots, the only people on board, are killed.
- 2020 – Ukraine International Airlines Flight 752 crashes immediately after takeoff at Tehran Imam Khomeini International Airport; all 176 on board are killed. The plane was shot down by an Iranian anti-aircraft missile.
- 2021 – Twenty-three people are killed in what is described as a police ″massacre″ in La Vega, Caracas, Venezuela.
- 2023 – Supporters of former Brazil president Jair Bolsonaro storm the Brazilian Congress.

== Births ==
=== Pre-1600 ===
- 1037 – Su Dongpo, Chinese calligrapher and poet (died 1101)
- 1345 – Kadi Burhan al-Din, poet, kadi, and ruler of Sivas (died 1398)
- 1529 – John Frederick II, duke of Saxony (died 1595)
- 1583 – Simon Episcopius, Dutch theologian and academic (died 1643)
- 1587 – Johannes Fabricius, German astronomer and academic (died 1616)
- 1587 – Jan Pieterszoon Coen, Governor-General of the Dutch East Indies (died 1629)
- 1589 – Ivan Gundulić, Croatian poet and playwright (died 1638)

=== 1601–1900 ===
- 1601 – Baltasar Gracián, Spanish priest and author (died 1658)
- 1626 – Jean Talon, first Intendant of New France (died 1694)
- 1628 – François-Henri de Montmorency, duc de Luxembourg, French general (died 1695)
- 1632 – Samuel von Pufendorf, German economist and jurist (died 1694)
- 1635 – Luis Manuel Fernández de Portocarrero, Spanish cardinal (died 1709)
- 1638 – Elisabetta Sirani, Italian painter (died 1665)
- 1735 – John Carroll, American archbishop, founder of Georgetown University (died 1815)
- 1763 – Edmond-Charles Genêt, French-American translator and diplomat (died 1834)
- 1786 – Nicholas Biddle, American banker and financier (died 1844)
- 1788 – Rudolf of Austria, Austrian archduke and archbishop (died 1831)
- 1792 – Lowell Mason, American composer and educator (died 1872)
- 1805 – John Bigler, American lawyer, politician, and diplomat, 3rd Governor of California (died 1871)
- 1805 – Orson Hyde, American religious leader, 3rd President of the Quorum of the Twelve Apostles (died 1878)
- 1812 – Sigismond Thalberg, Swiss pianist and composer (died 1871)
- 1817 – Theophilus Shepstone, English-South African politician (died 1893)
- 1821 – James Longstreet, American general and diplomat, United States Ambassador to Turkey (died 1904)
- 1823 – Alfred Russel Wallace, Welsh geographer, biologist, and explorer (died 1913)
- 1824 – Wilkie Collins, English novelist, playwright, and short story writer (died 1889)
- 1824 – Francisco González Bocanegra, Mexican poet and composer (died 1861)
- 1830 – Hans von Bülow, German pianist and composer (died 1894)
- 1836 – Lawrence Alma-Tadema, Dutch-English painter and academic (died 1912)
- 1843 – Frederick Abberline, English police officer (died 1929)
- 1852 – James Milton Carroll, American pastor and author (died 1931)
- 1859 – Fanny Bullock Workman, American mountaineer, geographer, and cartographer (died 1925)
- 1860 – Emma Booth-Tucker, English author (died 1903)
- 1862 – Frank Nelson Doubleday, American publisher, founded the Doubleday Publishing Company (died 1934)
- 1864 – Prince Albert Victor, Duke of Clarence and Avondale (died 1892)
- 1865 – Winnaretta Singer, American philanthropist (died 1943)
- 1866 – William G. Conley, American educator and politician, 18th Governor of West Virginia (died 1940)
- 1867 – Emily Greene Balch, American economist and author, Nobel Prize laureate (died 1961)
- 1870 – Miguel Primo de Rivera, Spanish general and politician, Prime Minister of Spain (died 1930)
- 1871 – Jeanne Adnet, French anarchist (died 1942)
- 1871 – James Craig, 1st Viscount Craigavon, Irish captain and politician, 1st Prime Minister of Northern Ireland (died 1940)
- 1873 – Iuliu Maniu, Romanian lawyer and politician, 32nd Prime Minister of Romania (died 1953)
- 1881 – Henrik Shipstead, American dentist and politician (died 1960)
- 1881 – Linnie Marsh Wolfe, American librarian and author (died 1945)
- 1883 – Pavel Filonov, Russian painter and poet (died 1941)
- 1883 – Patrick J. Hurley, American general, politician, and diplomat, 51st United States Secretary of War (died 1963)
- 1885 – John Curtin, Australian journalist and politician, 14th Prime Minister of Australia (died 1945)
- 1885 – Mór Kóczán, Hungarian javelin thrower and pastor (died 1972)
- 1885 – A. J. Muste, Dutch-American pastor and activist (died 1967)
- 1888 – Richard Courant, German-American mathematician and academic (died 1972)
- 1891 – Walther Bothe, German physicist and academic, Nobel Prize laureate (died 1957)
- 1891 – Storm Jameson, English journalist and author (died 1986)
- 1891 – Bronislava Nijinska, Russian dancer and choreographer (died 1972)
- 1896 – Jaromír Weinberger, Czech-American composer and academic (died 1967)
- 1897 – Dennis Wheatley, English soldier and author (died 1977)
- 1899 – S. W. R. D. Bandaranaike, Sri Lankan lawyer and politician, 4th Prime Minister of Sri Lanka (died 1959)
- 1900 – Dorothy Adams, American character actress (died 1988)
- 1900 – Serge Poliakoff, Russian-French painter (died 1969)

=== 1901–present ===
- 1902 – Carl Rogers, American psychologist and academic (died 1987)
- 1904 – Karl Brandt, German physician and SS officer (died 1948)
- 1905 – Carl Gustav Hempel, German philosopher from the Vienna and the Berlin Circle (died 1997)
- 1908 – William Hartnell, English actor (died 1975)
- 1908 – Fearless Nadia, Australian-Indian actress and stuntwoman (died 1996)
- 1909 – Ashapoorna Devi, Indian author and poet (died 1995)
- 1909 – Bruce Mitchell, South African cricketer (died 1995)
- 1909 – Evelyn Wood, American author and educator (died 1995)
- 1910 – Galina Ulanova, Russian actress and ballerina (died 1998)
- 1911 – Gypsy Rose Lee, American actress, dancer, and author (died 1970)
- 1912 – José Ferrer, Puerto Rican-American actor and director (died 1992)
- 1912 – Lawrence Walsh, Canadian-American lawyer, judge, and politician, 4th United States Deputy Attorney General (died 2014)
- 1915 – Walker Cooper, American baseball player and manager (died 1991)
- 1917 – Peter Matthew Hillsman Taylor, American novelist, short story writer, and playwright (died 1994)
- 1920 – Douglas Wilmer, English actor (died 2016)
- 1922 – Dale D. Myers, American engineer (died 2015)
- 1923 – Larry Storch, American actor and comedian (died 2022)
- 1923 – Giorgio Tozzi, American opera singer and actor (died 2011)
- 1923 – Johnny Wardle, English cricketer (died 1985)
- 1923 – Joseph Weizenbaum, German-American computer scientist and author (died 2008)
- 1924 – Benjamin Lees, Chinese-American soldier and composer (died 2010)
- 1924 – Ron Moody, English actor and singer (died 2015)
- 1925 – Mohan Rakesh, Indian author and playwright (died 1972)
- 1926 – Evelyn Lear, American operatic soprano (died 2012)
- 1926 – Kerwin Mathews, American actor (died 2007)
- 1926 – Kelucharan Mohapatra, Indian dancer and choreographer (died 2004)
- 1926 – Hanae Mori, Japanese fashion designer (died 2022)
- 1926 – Soupy Sales, American comedian and actor (died 2009)
- 1927 – Charles Tomlinson, English poet and academic (died 2015)
- 1928 – Slade Gorton, American colonel, lawyer, and politician, 14th Attorney General of Washington (died 2020)
- 1929 – Saeed Jaffrey, Indian-British actor (died 2015)
- 1931 – Bill Graham, German-American businessman (died 1991)
- 1931 – Clarence Benjamin Jones, American lawyer and scholar
- 1933 – Charles Osgood, American soldier and journalist (died 2024)
- 1933 – Jean-Marie Straub, French director and screenwriter (died 2022)
- 1934 – Jacques Anquetil, French cyclist (died 1987)
- 1934 – Roy Kinnear, British actor (died 1988)
- 1935 – Elvis Presley, American singer, guitarist, and actor (died 1977)
- 1936 – Robert May, Baron May of Oxford, Australian-English zoologist, ecologist, and academic (died 2020)
- 1937 – Shirley Bassey, Welsh singer
- 1938 – Bob Eubanks, American game show host and producer
- 1939 – Carolina Herrera, Venezuelan-American fashion designer
- 1940 – Cristy Lane, American country and gospel singer
- 1941 – Graham Chapman, English actor and screenwriter (died 1989)
- 1941 – Boris Vallejo, Peruvian-American painter
- 1942 – Stephen Hawking, English physicist and author (died 2018)
- 1942 – Junichirō Koizumi, Japanese politician, 56th Prime Minister of Japan
- 1942 – Yvette Mimieux, American actress (died 2022)
- 1944 – Terry Brooks, American lawyer and author
- 1945 – Phil Beal, English footballer
- 1945 – Nancy Bond, American author and academic
- 1945 – Kathleen Noone, American actress
- 1946 – Robby Krieger, American guitarist and songwriter
- 1946 – Miguel Ángel Félix Gallardo, Mexican drug lord (died 2026)
- 1947 – David Bowie, English singer-songwriter, producer, and actor (died 2016)
- 1947 – Antti Kalliomäki, Finnish pole vaulter and politician
- 1948 – Gillies MacKinnon, Scottish director and screenwriter
- 1949 – Shadia Abu Ghazaleh, Palestinian militant (died 1968)
- 1949 – Lawrence Rowe, Jamaican cricketer
- 1951 – Kenny Anthony, Saint Lucian politician, 5th Prime Minister of Saint Lucia
- 1952 – Vladimir Feltsman, Russian-American pianist and educator
- 1952 – Peter McCullagh, Irish mathematician and academic
- 1953 – Marián Šťastný, Slovak ice hockey player
- 1953 – Bruce Sutter, American baseball pitcher (died 2022)
- 1955 – Harriet Sansom Harris, American actress
- 1955 – Mike Reno, Canadian singer and drummer
- 1957 – Dwight Clark, American football player (died 2018)
- 1957 – Nacho Duato, Spanish dancer and choreographer
- 1957 – Ron Cephas Jones, American actor (died 2023)
- 1957 – Calvin Natt, American basketball player
- 1958 – Betsy DeVos, American businesswoman and politician, 11th Secretary of Education
- 1958 – Rey Misterio, Mexican wrestler, trainer, and actor (died 2024)
- 1959 – Paul Hester, Australian drummer (died 2005)
- 1960 – Dave Weckl, American drummer
- 1961 – Calvin Smith, American sprinter
- 1964 – Ron Sexsmith, Canadian singer-songwriter
- 1965 – Michelle Forbes, American actress
- 1966 – Maria Pitillo, American actress
- 1966 – Igor Vyazmikin, Russian ice hockey player (died 2009)
- 1966 – Andrew Wood, American singer-songwriter (died 1990)
- 1967 – Willie Anderson, American basketball player
- 1967 – R. Kelly, American singer-songwriter, producer, and sex offender
- 1967 – Tom Watson, English politician
- 1968 – Bull Nakano, Japanese professional wrestler
- 1971 – Jason Giambi, American baseball player
- 1971 – Andreas Kollross, Austrian politician
- 1971 – Pascal Zuberbühler, Swiss footballer and coach
- 1972 – Paul Clement, English footballer, coach, and manager
- 1973 – Mike Cameron, American baseball player
- 1976 – Jenny Lewis, American singer-songwriter, musician, and actress
- 1977 – Amber Benson, American actress, writer, director, and producer
- 1978 – Marco Fu, Hong Kongese snooker player
- 1979 – Seol Ki-hyeon, South Korean footballer and manager
- 1979 – Windell Middlebrooks, American actor (died 2015)
- 1979 – Adrian Mutu, Romanian footballer
- 1979 – Stipe Pletikosa, Croatian footballer
- 1979 – Sarah Polley, Canadian actress and director
- 1980 – Sam Riley, English actor and singer
- 1981 – Genevieve Cortese, American actress
- 1981 – Jeff Francis, Canadian baseball player
- 1982 – Gaby Hoffmann, American actress
- 1982 (or 1983, 1984) – Kim Jong Un, North Korean soldier and politician, 3rd Supreme Leader of North Korea
- 1983 – Chris Masters, American wrestler
- 1984 – Jeff Francoeur, American baseball player and broadcaster
- 1987 – Chris Douglas-Roberts, American basketball player
- 1987 – Cynthia Erivo, English actress and singer-songwriter
- 1987 – Freddie Stroma, English actor
- 1988 – Adrián López, Spanish footballer
- 1988 – Michael Mancienne, English footballer
- 1988 – Alex Tyus, American-Israeli basketball player
- 1989 – Aaron Cruden, New Zealand rugby player
- 1990 – Blair Walsh, American football player
- 1991 – Josh Hazlewood, Australian cricketer
- 1991 – Stefan Johansen, Norwegian footballer
- 1991 – Stefan Savić, Montenegrin footballer
- 1991 – Greg Smith, American basketball player
- 1992 – Stefanie Dolson, American basketball player
- 1992 – Koke, Spanish footballer
- 1992 – Valkyrae, American online streamer
- 1993 – William Karlsson, Swedish ice hockey player
- 1993 – Sophie Pascoe, New Zealand swimmer
- 1994 – Glenn Robinson III, American basketball player
- 1995 – Ryan Destiny, American actress and singer
- 1998 – Tony Bradley, American basketball player
- 1998 – Jhoan Durán, Dominican baseball player
- 1999 – Ignas Brazdeikis, Lithuanian-Canadian basketball player
- 1999 – Damiano David, Italian singer-songwriter
- 2000 – Noah Cyrus, American singer, songwriter, and actress
- 2001 – Zach Charbonnet, American football player

== Deaths ==
=== Pre-1600 ===
- 307 – Hui of Jin, Chinese emperor (born 259)
- 482 – Severinus of Noricum, Italian apostle and saint
- 871 – Bagsecg, Viking warrior and leader
- 926 – Athelm, archbishop of Canterbury
- 1079 – Adèle of France, countess of Flanders (born 1009)
- 1107 – Edgar, King of Scotland (born 1074)
- 1198 – Celestine III, pope of the Catholic Church (born 1106)
- 1337 – Giotto, Italian painter and architect, designed Scrovegni Chapel and Giotto's Campanile (born 1266)
- 1354 – Charles de la Cerda, French nobleman (born 1327)
- 1424 – Stephen Zaccaria, archbishop of Patras
- 1456 – Lawrence Giustiniani, Italian bishop and saint (born 1381)
- 1538 – Beatrice of Portugal, duchess of Savoy (born 1504)
- 1557 – Albert Alcibiades, margrave of Brandenburg-Kulmbach (born 1522)
- 1570 – Philibert de l'Orme, French sculptor and architect, designed the Château d'Anet (born 1510)
- 1598 – John George, Elector of Brandenburg (born 1525)

=== 1601–1900 ===
- 1642 – Galileo Galilei, Italian physicist, mathematician, astronomer, and philosopher (born 1564)
- 1707 – John Dalrymple, 1st Earl of Stair, Scottish soldier and politician, Scottish Secretary of State (born 1648)
- 1713 – Arcangelo Corelli, Italian violinist and composer (born 1653)
- 1775 – John Baskerville, English printer and type designer (born 1706)
- 1789 – Jack Broughton, English boxer (born 1703)
- 1794 – Justus Möser, German lawyer and jurist (born 1720)
- 1815 – Edward Pakenham, Anglo-Irish general and politician (born 1778)
- 1825 – Eli Whitney, American engineer and theorist, invented the cotton gin (born 1765)
- 1854 – William Beresford, 1st Viscount Beresford, English field marshal and politician, Lieutenant-General of the Ordnance (born 1768)
- 1865 – Aimé, duc de Clermont-Tonnerre, French general and politician, French Minister of Defence (born 1779)
- 1874 – Charles Étienne Brasseur de Bourbourg, French historian and archaeologist (born 1814)
- 1878 – Nikolay Nekrasov, Russian poet and critic (born 1821)
- 1880 – Emperor Norton, English-American businessman (born 1811)
- 1883 – Miska Magyarics, Slovene-Hungarian poet (born 1825)
- 1896 – William Rainey Marshall, American banker and politician, 5th Governor of Minnesota (born 1825)
- 1896 – Paul Verlaine, French poet and writer (born 1844)

=== 1901–present ===
- 1914 – Simon Bolivar Buckner, American general and 30th Governor of Kentucky (born 1823)
- 1916 – Rembrandt Bugatti, Italian sculptor (born 1884)
- 1916 – Ada Rehan, Irish-American actress (born 1860)
- 1918 – Ellis H. Roberts, American journalist and politician, 20th Treasurer of the United States (born 1827)
- 1920 – Josef Josephi, Polish-born singer and actor (born 1852)
- 1925 – George Bellows, American painter (born 1882)
- 1934 – Andrei Bely, Russian novelist, poet, and critic (born 1880)
- 1934 – Alexandre Stavisky, Ukrainian-French financier (born 1886)
- 1938 – Johnny Gruelle, American author and illustrator (born 1880)
- 1941 – Robert Baden-Powell, 1st Baron Baden-Powell, English general and founder of the Scout movement (born 1857)
- 1941 – Vladimír Mandl, Czechoslovak lawyer (born 1899)
- 1942 – Joseph Franklin Rutherford, American lawyer and religious leader (born 1869)
- 1943 – Andres Larka, Estonian general and politician, 1st Estonian Minister of War (born 1879)
- 1944 – William Kissam Vanderbilt II, American lieutenant and sailor (born 1878)
- 1945 – Karl Ernst Krafft, Swiss astrologer and author (born 1900)
- 1948 – Kurt Schwitters, German painter and graphic designer (born 1887)
- 1950 – Joseph Schumpeter, Czech-American economist and academic (born 1883)
- 1952 – Antonia Maury, American astronomer and astrophysicist (born 1866)
- 1953 – Hugh Binney, English admiral and politician, 16th Governor of Tasmania (born 1883)
- 1954 – Eduard Wiiralt, Estonian-French painter and illustrator (born 1898)
- 1958 – Mary Colter, American architect, designed the Desert View Watchtower (born 1869)
- 1961 – Schoolboy Rowe, American baseball player and coach (born 1910)
- 1963 – Kay Sage, American painter (born 1898)
- 1975 – Richard Tucker, American operatic tenor (born 1913)
- 1976 – Zhou Enlai, Chinese soldier and politician, 1st Premier of the People's Republic of China (born 1898)
- 1980 – John Mauchly, American physicist and academic (born 1907)
- 1982 – Grégoire Aslan, Swiss-English actor and screenwriter (born 1908)
- 1983 – Gerhard Barkhorn, German general and pilot (born 1919)
- 1986 – Pierre Fournier, French cellist and educator (born 1906)
- 1990 – Bernard Krigstein, American illustrator (born 1919)
- 1990 – Terry-Thomas, English actor and comedian (born 1911)
- 1991 – Steve Clark, English singer-songwriter and guitarist (born 1960)
- 1994 – Pat Buttram, American actor and comedian (born 1915)
- 1994 – Harvey Haddix, American baseball player and coach (born 1925)
- 1996 – Metin Göktepe, Turkish photographer and journalist (born 1968)
- 1996 – François Mitterrand, French sergeant and politician, 21st President of France (born 1916)
- 1997 – Melvin Calvin, American chemist and academic, Nobel Prize laureate (born 1911)
- 1998 – Michael Tippett, English composer and conductor (born 1905)
- 2000 – Hilary Smart, American sailor (born 1925)
- 2002 – Alexander Prokhorov, Australian-Russian physicist and academic, Nobel Prize laureate (born 1916)
- 2002 – Dave Thomas, American businessman and philanthropist, founded Wendy's (born 1932)
- 2003 – Ron Goodwin, English composer and conductor (born 1925)
- 2006 – Tony Banks, Baron Stratford, Northern Irish broadcaster and politician, Minister for Sport and the Olympics (born 1942)
- 2007 – Jane Bolin, American lawyer and judge (born 1908)
- 2007 – Arthur Cockfield, Baron Cockfield, English lawyer and politician, Secretary of State for Business, Innovation and Skills (born 1916)
- 2007 – Yvonne De Carlo, Canadian-American actress and singer (born 1922)
- 2007 – David Ervine, Northern Irish politician and activist (born 1953)
- 2007 – Iwao Takamoto, American animator, director, and producer (born 1925)
- 2008 – George Moore, Australian jockey and trainer (born 1923)
- 2009 – Lasantha Wickrematunge, Sri Lankan journalist (born 1958)
- 2010 – Art Clokey, American animator, director, producer, and screenwriter (born 1921)
- 2011 – Jiří Dienstbier, Czech journalist and politician (born 1937)
- 2011 – Thorbjørn Svenssen, Norwegian footballer (born 1924)
- 2012 – Dave Alexander, American singer and pianist (born 1938)
- 2012 – T. J. Hamblin, English haematologist and academic (born 1943)
- 2012 – Alexis Weissenberg, Bulgarian-French pianist and educator (born 1929)
- 2013 – Kenojuak Ashevak, Canadian sculptor and illustrator (born 1927)
- 2013 – Jeanne Manford, American educator and activist, co-founded PFLAG (born 1920)
- 2013 – Alasdair Milne, Indian-English director and producer (born 1930)
- 2014 – Irma Heijting-Schuhmacher, Dutch-Australian swimmer (born 1925)
- 2014 – Antonino P. Roman, Filipino lawyer and politician (born 1939)
- 2015 – Andraé Crouch, American singer-songwriter, producer, and pastor (born 1942)
- 2015 – Kep Enderby, Australian lawyer, judge, and politician, 23rd Attorney-General for Australia (born 1926)
- 2015 – Patsy Garrett, American actress and singer (born 1921)
- 2016 – Maria Teresa de Filippis, Italian racing driver (born 1926)
- 2016 – German Moreno, Filipino television host, actor, comedian and talent manager (born 1933)
- 2017 – Nicolai Gedda, Swedish operatic tenor (born 1925)
- 2017 – James Mancham, Seychellois politician, President 1976-77 (born 1939)
- 2017 – Akbar Hashemi Rafsanjani, Iranian politician (born 1934)
- 2017 – Peter Sarstedt, Indian-British singer-songwriter and guitarist (born 1941)
- 2020 – Pat Dalton, Australian footballer (born 1942)
- 2020 – Buck Henry, American actor, screenwriter, and director (born 1930)
- 2021 – Iancu Țucărman, Romanian Holocaust survivor (born 1922)
- 2022 – Michael Lang, American concert promoter and producer (born 1944)
- 2024 – Adan Canto, Mexican actor (born 1981)
- 2025 – Mangkra Souvanna Phouma, Laotian prince (born 1938)

== Holidays and observances ==
- Babinden (Belarus, Russia)
- Christian feast day:
  - Abo of Tiflis
  - Apollinaris Claudius
  - Blessed Eurosia Fabris
  - Gauchito Gil (Folk Catholicism)
  - Gudula
  - Harriet Bedell (Episcopal Church (USA))
  - Lawrence Giustiniani
  - Lucian of Beauvais
  - Maximus of Pavia
  - Our Lady of Prompt Succor (Roman Catholic Church)
  - Pega (Anglican and Roman Catholic churches)
  - Severinus of Noricum
  - Thorfinn of Hamar
  - January 8 (Eastern Orthodox liturgics)
- Commonwealth Day (Northern Mariana Islands)
- Earliest day on which Children's Day can fall, while January 14 is the latest; celebrated on the second Saturday in January. (Thailand)
- Typing Day (International observance)
