= Sucre Parish =

Sucre Parish may refer to:

== Ecuador ==
- Mariscal Sucre, Quito, an urban parish of Quito Canton, Pichincha, Ecuador
- Sucre Parish, Guayaquil, a parish of Guayaquil

== Venezuela ==
- Sucre Parish, Caracas
- Sucre Parish, Nueva Esparta, a parish of Gómez Municipality

== See also ==
- Sucre Municipality (disambiguation)
