= Catedral Parish =

Catedral
- Parish
- Catedral as seen located in the Libertador municipality.
- Country: Venezuela
- Federal district: Distrito Capital
- Municipality: Libertador

Area
  - Land: 1.0 km^{2} (0.39 sq mi)
- Elevation: 930 m (3,050 ft)

Population (2011)
  - Total: 10,540
  - Density: 11,000/km^{2} (27,000/sq mi)

Catedral is a parish located in the Libertador Bolivarian Municipality northeast of the city of Caracas, Venezuela.
