= El Paraíso, Caracas =

El Paraíso
- Parish
- El Paraíso as seen located in the Libertador municipality.
- Country: Venezuela
- Federal district: Distrito Capital
- Municipality: Libertador

Area
  - Land: 10.4 km^{2} (4.0 sq mi)

Population (2011)
  - Total: 188,830
  - Density: 18,200/km^{2} (47,000/sq mi)

El Paraíso is a parish located in the Libertador Bolivarian Municipality, central of the city of Caracas, Venezuela.

== Notable people ==
- Manuel Aguirre, priest and Jesuit

== Works cited ==
- Echenique, Schirley (24 September 2025). "P. Manuel Aguirre Elorriaga, S.J. (1904 – 1969) Amado y respetado". Jesuits. Archived from the original on 11 May 2026.
