= Conchita Moreno =

Venezuelan bullfighter (1927–2007)

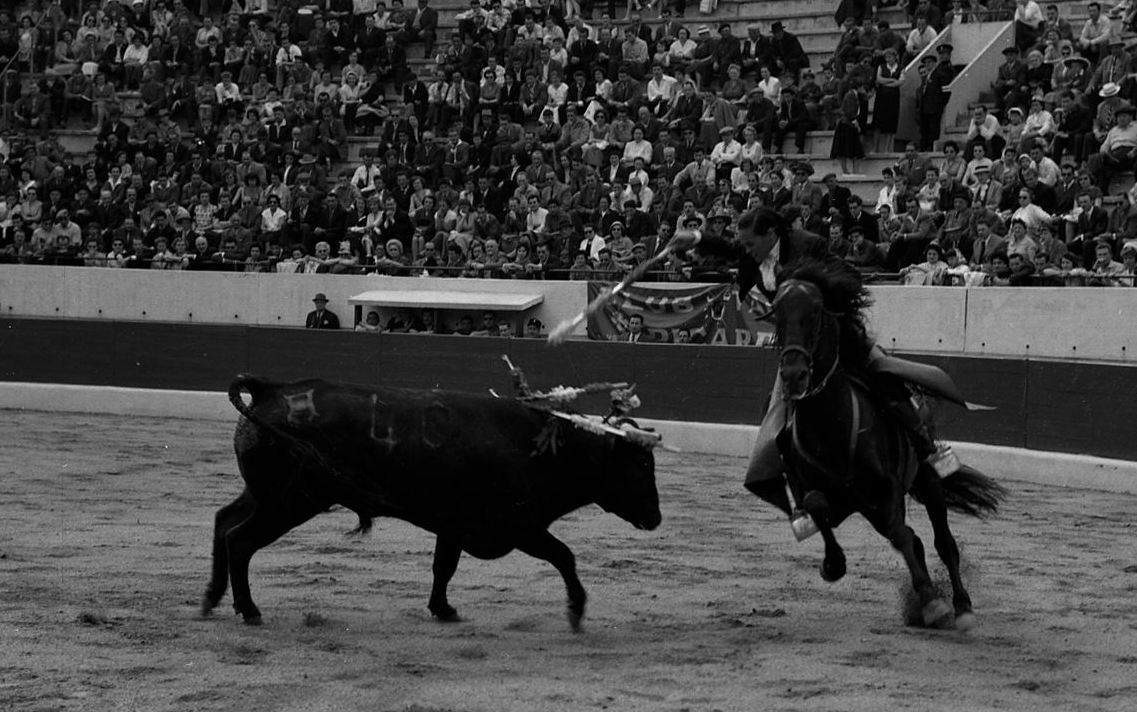

Personal information
- Born: 8 December 1927 Altagracia Parish, Caracas, Venezuela
- Died: 2007 (aged 79–80)

Sport
- Sport: Bullfighting
- Rank: Rejoneadora

Conchita Moreno (Caracas, December 8, 1927 – 2007) was a professional female mounted bullfighter from Venezuela.

== Early life ==
Moreno explains that she is named Conchita because she was born on the day of the Immaculate Conception, the second of seven, to Norberto Moreno Mayora (a builder from Ocumare del Tuy, who constructed the famous Las Palomas area of Macuto) and Juana D'Amico del Castillo (a textile worker who may have been the first woman to use an electric loom). Her maternal grandparents were Italian, and emigrated to Venezuela before her mother's birth. Moreno said that she was raised in a very Christian household, and had little means, also living with other older female family members. As a child, she had wanted to be a lawyer, and says that her eldest granddaughter did become one.

When Moreno first sought out bullfighting it was during the Second World War, after having snuck out of school to watch the bullfights in El Valle, Caracas, where she spent most of her childhood. She says that she went in secret with her mother, and that when she expressed her desire to bullfight to her father he wasn't impressed, accusing her mother of "coddling". She says that her father said his objections were because of how masculine the sport is, but she suspects that he wanted her to go to university because she was good in school.

== Career ==
=== Career beginnings ===
After dabbling in bullfighting in school and expressing an interest to her parents, Moreno says that her desire became more founded when the cuadrilla of female bullfighters came to show in Caracas. Despite still being in high school, she spoke to the crew and managed to get a "casting" to join the team, in which she was successful. However, it was only after the war ended and normalcy resumed that she fully decided to take up bullfighting, in 1947. However, the 1945 Venezuelan coup d'état maintained a level of disruption in her country, and so she says that she "wanted to quickly learn as much as I could about bullfighting, and leave". Moreno says that she made a deal with her parents, including going to university, to be allowed to train; her father also became one of her harshest critics, telling her before her first presentation that if she was going to fight, she would have to do it well.

It was only the Sunday after her first fight that Moreno had her alternativa. She notes that since Juanita Cruz, a bullfighter from Madrid, had visited Caracas, the sport had grown more popular in the city, and there was a lot of hype around this fight. She faced off in the alternativa with Esther Álvarez, a relative of famous banderillero Cipriano Álvarez. Moreno says that she still remembers this fight with warmth, because it is when she cut her first ear.

In her early years of fighting, Moreno was working in a law firm in Venezuela, having got her degree, taking English classes and fighting at weekends. After some time, her commitments to her cuadrilla meant that she would have to travel abroad for fights, and she says that even though she was an adult by this time and had met all of her father's requirements, he still wouldn't sign the travel documents to let her leave the country — she says that her family were worried she could be hurt and they'd never find out — so her mother signed the papers behind his back, and loaned her some money to make up the cost of the plane ticket.

=== Tours of Latin America ===
Moreno's first travels were to Mexico, where she fought in Guadalajara, Tampico, Veracruz, Xochimilco, Tijuana and Acapulco. In Mexico City, Moreno met the bullfighter María Cobián, "La Serranita", who told Moreno of her desire to travel to Spain to fight, but that she would not do so, because in Spain the women were only allowed to fight bulls on horseback.

It was during the Mexico fights that they were hired to present in Colombia, successfully travelling through Cartagena, Barranquilla, Cali, Manizales and Bogotá. The cuadrilla then continued travelling south, and performed in Peru; here in Lima is where Moreno suffered a serious injury to her right leg.

Whilst traveling Latin America, Moreno received news that her father had taken sick. She quit the cuadrilla and returned home, finding her father gravely ill. She says that she felt guilty for spending so much time away, and promised her father that she wouldn't travel again. However, she added that she "took advantage of the time in Caracas to build contacts in Portugal". She found representation as a freelance bullfighter, and began training on horseback, because since speaking to Cobián "Spain, the birthplace of bullfighting, hadn't left [her] thoughts". She said that at this point she decided that if she were to return to bullfighting, it would be as a rejoneadora.

After her father died, Moreno took up the sport full-time again, travelling the interior of Venezuela in exhibition performances with her brother Benjamín. They came up with a business of traveling bullrings, to bring the show to smaller communities, and combined circus acts with the fights, building a collapsible tent for their show that could also be transported with attached wheels when erected.

=== Move to Europe ===
Whilst in Venezuela, her agent called and requested she return to Caracas, because she had received an offer in Portugal. With this news, Benjamín chose to join the Navy, and their sister Victoria joined Conchita's team helping with administration. She took a boat to Vigo, and stayed with the D'a Silva family in Lisbon. In only a few months, she had debuted at the Campo Pequeno bullring. She says that she enjoyed it more here, because the bulls were not killed and even the banderillas were designed to not harm them. After some time, the agent had made contacts and got her a contract in Spain. Moreno took the train to Madrid and was greeted by Manuel Córdoba, who would become her representation for the Iberian Peninsula. However, when news got around that she was in Spain, the bullfighting community published dissents, assuming that she had gone to fight on foot. Despite her assurances, and other peoples' defences, the main players of the Madrid bullfighting community but a black mark on her name.

Moreno continued training, and Córdoba got her some fights in France. In Marseille she presented in a series called the "Bolivariana" where other Venezuelan bullfighters were presenting — Córdoba had already informed her that many had followed her move to Europe, and she had met with some in Spain. Here, she performed a complex bullfight (also feigned to not harm the bull) on horseback. Moreno says that she, like other female and foreign bullfighters, continued to perform in France and Portugal, suggesting that even after she had shown she was not continuing to fight on foot the Spaniards did not want "invaders" joining their industry. However, they did lift the mark on her name and allowed her to take Spanish contracts after some time, and she eventually got to "fulfil [her] biggest wish": to perform at Las Ventas.

She continued to travel, and in the Northern winter she took work in the Americas, instead, spending time in Latin America again, as well as in Texas, New Mexico, and Baja California in the United States, but spent a lot of the rest of her career in Europe.

=== Benavente injury and retirement ===
Moreno suffered a traumatic head injury at the Plaza de Benavente in Benavente, Zamora, Spain, in a fight between Hispanic nations in 1958. She was on her Arabian horse named "Moreno" and got into the last moments of the bullfight, when "Moreno" could not back away and was hit by the bull's charge, causing both Moreno and "Moreno" to crash into the side of the ring, with "Moreno" landing on her. She was rushed to La Milagrosa hospital. The injury fractured her skull, and she was comatose for 25 days. After coming round, she was advised by doctors to stop fighting, which she chose to do, wanting to recover. She has mentioned that it reminded her of her first injury in Peru, which made her lose fear in the bullring. She has suggested that her agent at the time shouldn't have taken the contract, because the bullring was so small, but once it had been accepted they couldn't cancel. After Moreno's death, her daughter María Esperanza began collecting documents of her legacy, and received a letter from Pilar Huerga Mielgo in Benavente, who said that "many of those who attended that bullfight thought, and ran into the square convinced, that that young girl "of the big, beautiful eyes" had fatefully died, due to the seriousness of the accident."

Moreno's recovery took several months, which was mostly spent in a specialist center for toreros in Madrid, before she returned to Venezuela. She still suffered symptoms for many years after the injury, including partial memory loss and occasional paralysis on her right side. Initially, she could not even walk and struggled with simple things, and she thanks God for her safety.

She suffered the injury after living in Spain for six years, and returned to Venezuela to start a family.

== Personal life ==
Moreno says that after leaving, whenever she was in Venezuela, she tried to see her family. She has also said that her career made it impossible to have a relationship, though she dated a little. She says that she dated a famous singer in Mexico who became very obsessive and possessive, causing her to flee first to her mother's house, and then back to Europe. When she returned to Venezuela, she had a large family.

She has publicly criticised the Running of the Bulls in Pamplona. Sources suggest she also co-starred in the 1957 Brazilian Western film Paixão de Gaúcho.
