= La Candelaria Parish =

La Candelaria
- Parish
- Coordinates: 10°30′13.082″N 66°54′17.302″W
- Country: Venezuela
- Federal district: Distrito Capital
- Municipality: Libertador

Area
  - Total: 1.2 km^{2} (0.46 sq mi)

Population (2011)
  - Total: 101,088
  - Density: 84,000/km^{2} (220,000/sq mi)

La Candelaria is one of the 22 parishes located in the Libertador Bolivarian Municipality and one of 32 of Caracas, Venezuela.
