= La Pastora Parish =

La Pastora
- Parish
- Country: Venezuela
- Federal district: Distrito Capital
- Municipality: Libertador

Area
  - Total: 7.6 km^{2} (2.9 sq mi)

Population (2011)
  - Total: 129,980
  - Density: 17,000/km^{2} (44,000/sq mi)

La Pastora is one of the 22 parishes located in the Libertador Bolivarian Municipality and one of 32 of Caracas, Venezuela.
