= Altagracia Parish =

Altagracia
- Parish
- Coordinates: 10°30′58″N 66°54′48″W
- Country: Venezuela
- Federal district: Distrito Capital
- Municipality: Libertador

Area
  - Total: 9.9 km^{2} (3.8 sq mi)

Population (2011)
  - Total: 67,700
  - Density: 6,800/km^{2} (18,000/sq mi)

Altagracia is one of the 22 parishes located in the Libertador Bolivarian Municipality and one of 32 of Caracas, Venezuela.
