= Santa Rosalía Parish =

Santa Rosalía
- Parish
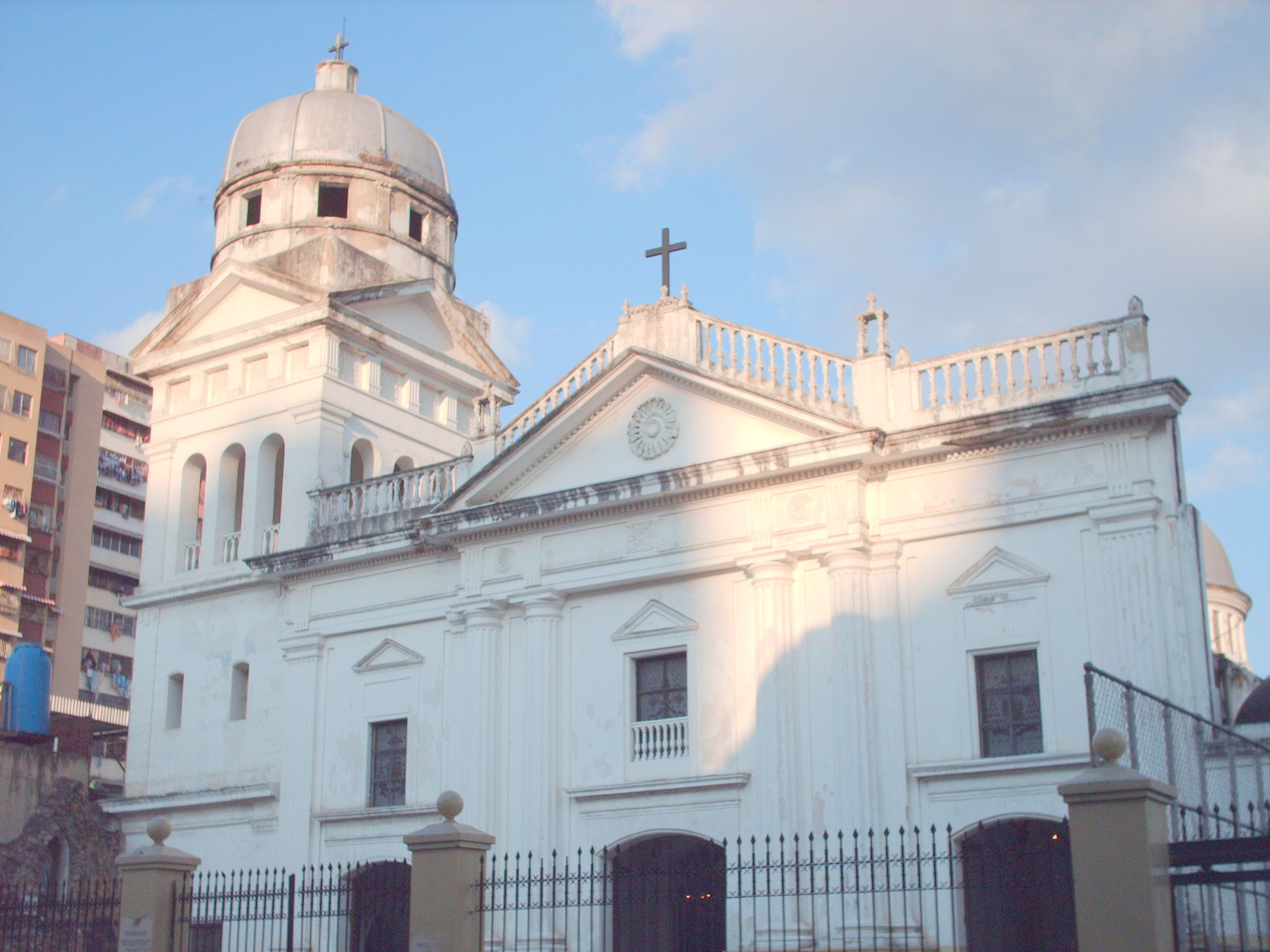

- Country: Venezuela
- Federal district: Distrito Capital
- Municipality: Libertador

Area
  - Total: 6.1 km^{2} (2.4 sq mi)

Population (2011)
  - Total: 190,282
  - Density: 31,000/km^{2} (81,000/sq mi)

Santa Rosalía is one of the 22 parishes located in the Libertador Bolivarian Municipality and one of 32 of Caracas, Venezuela.
