= Sucre Parish, Caracas =

Sucre
- Parish
- Country: Venezuela
- Federal district: Distrito Capital
- Municipality: Libertador

Area
  - Total: 58.3 km^{2} (22.5 sq mi)

Population (2011)
  - Total: 451,079
  - Density: 7,740/km^{2} (20,000/sq mi)

Sucre is one of the 22 parishes located in the Libertador Bolivarian Municipality and one of 32 of Caracas, Venezuela.
