= La Vega raid =

2021 police raid on the gang controlling La Vega Parish, Caracas, Venezuela

- Part of Crisis in Venezuela
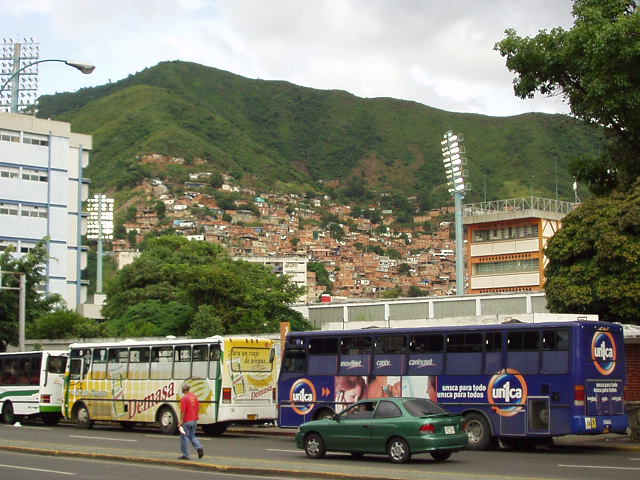
- La Vega slum, Caracas, where the raid took place

- La Vega as seen located in the Libertador municipality.
- Location: La Vega Parish, Caracas, Venezuela
- Date: January 8, 2021
- Deaths: 23
- Injuries: 0
- Motive: Police operation

The La Vega raid was a police raid that occurred on 8 January 2021 in La Vega Parish, Caracas, Venezuela. The objective of the raid was to take control of La Vega Parish, which was controlled by a criminal organization, led by Leonardo José Polanco Angulo; he was a drug lord, known as "El Loco Leo". Members of the Venezuelan National Police (PNB), the Special Action Forces (FAES) and the Venezuelan National Guard seized control of the parish, killing a number of people in the neighborhood. According to investigative journalists and human rights organizations, the death toll was 23 people. By 11 January, no member of the Nicolás Maduro administration had made a statement about the events or announced a death toll.

== Background ==
In June 2019, the United Nations High Commissioner for Human Rights, Michelle Bachelet, documented dozens of extrajudicial killings in Venezuela and included among her report's recommendations to disband the Special Action Forces (FAES) and open an independent investigation of their actions. Few days after the report was published, Nicolás Maduro appeared publicly with FAES officers, praising them. Although Maduro's administration alleged that the report was plagued with "falsehoods", it has worked along Bachelet's Office. On a September 2020 update of the human rights situation of Venezuela, Bachelet stressed FAES' actions again and informed that according to the Public Ministry, seventy FAES officers had been indicted in several states.

A United Nations fact-finding mission, which said that Nicolas Maduro's government had committed systematic human rights violations amounting to crimes against humanity, called in 2020 for the FAES to be disbanded due to its role in extrajudicial killings.

== Events ==
In January 2021, police information found that members of a mafia that operates in Cota 905 in Caracas and El Loco Leo's criminal organization in El Valle Parish were waging a war against the police.

In the morning of 8 January, commissions of the Venezuelan National Police (PNB), of the Special Action Forces (FAES) and the Venezuelan National Guard took control of La Vega Parish in Caracas. Police came in with agents in motorcycles, armored vehicles and one light tank. According to police sources, all the deceased had criminal background or were in police registries, but relatives assured that many were arrested after raiding their homes and that they were later executed. Witnesses declared that many of the victims that were identified in Caracas' Bello Monte morgue were first alive at the moment of the arrest. There did not appear to be any police deaths from the confrontations.

As of 11 January, the Maduro administration had not made a statement about the events nor announced a death toll. Attorney General Tarek William Saab and the Interior Affairs Minister did not respond to comment requests by BBC Mundo. Neither Venezuela's information ministry nor the chief prosecutor's office immediately replied to requests for comment by Reuters.

The NGO Monitor de Víctimas (Victims Monitor) unofficially registered 24 deaths and identified 10 people, three of whom were minors; according to a report by Runrunes, "they would not be able to have funerals and would be taken directly to the cemetery". The outlet also reported that "several of the burials would be paid by the state". Former prosecutor and director of the Public Ministry, Zair Mundaray, declared that the bodies of the deceased had a "ballistic pattern that indicates extrajudicial killings".

The human rights organization PROVEA, declared that at least 23 people died during the operation, described the events as a "massacre" and asked the Ombudsman, Alfredo Ruiz, to offer explanations about the events and to file a complaint. Marino Alvarado, investigation coordinator of the organizations, declared that the relatives of the victims started to denounce the detention of people to be executed afterwards. Alvarado questioned that the police operation left no injured among the security officers or the victims, declared that the police operation was "the bloodiest carried out in the country" since the People Liberation Operations (OLP) started in 2015 and that it could be interpreted as an attempt by the government to take control of the zone to appease social protests, comparing the operation with OLPs carried out in the Cota 905, which resulted in 17 deaths, and one carried out in Aragua state in 2016, which resulted in 16 deaths.
