= Livia Gouverneur =

Venezuelan communist (1941–1961)

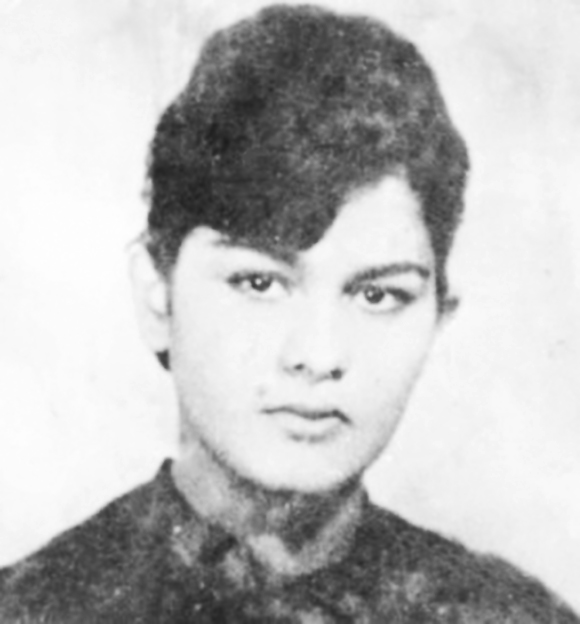
- Born: 15 July 1941
- Died: 1 November 1961 (aged 20)
- Alma mater: Central University of Venezuela
- Occupation: Student
- Political party: Communist Party of Venezuela

Livia Margarita Gouverneur Camero (15 July 1941 – 1 November 1961) was a Venezuelan student who was killed during a protest in support of the Cuban Revolution and against the presence in Venezuela of allies of Fulgencio Batista. Her death has become a symbol of social justice in Venezuela.

== Biography ==
Born on 15 July 1941 in San Agustín, the eldest of eleven children; her parents were César Gouverneur and Lola Camero. She studied psychology at Central University of Venezuela (UCV). She was a member of the Communist Party of Venezuela (PCV).

On 1 November 1961, Gouverneur took part in a demonstration that supported the Cuban Revolution and opposed the presence in Venezuela of some allies of Fulgencio Batista. During the protest, several students were shot by supporters of Batista, including Gouverneur, who was killed. There were claims at the time that she was shot outside La Hogareña, the centre for pro-Batista support.

== Legacy ==
The anniversary of her birth is celebrated in Venezuela, where her life has become an emblem of social justice. In 2013 student residences in Caracas were named after her. President Nicolás Maduro described her in 2020 as "the heroine and martyr of the people". In 2022 Eirimar Malavé spoke about her death to the National Assembly, with a speech that ended with "Long live the Venezuelan woman, long live Livia Gouverneur."
