= Coche Parish =

Coche
- Parish
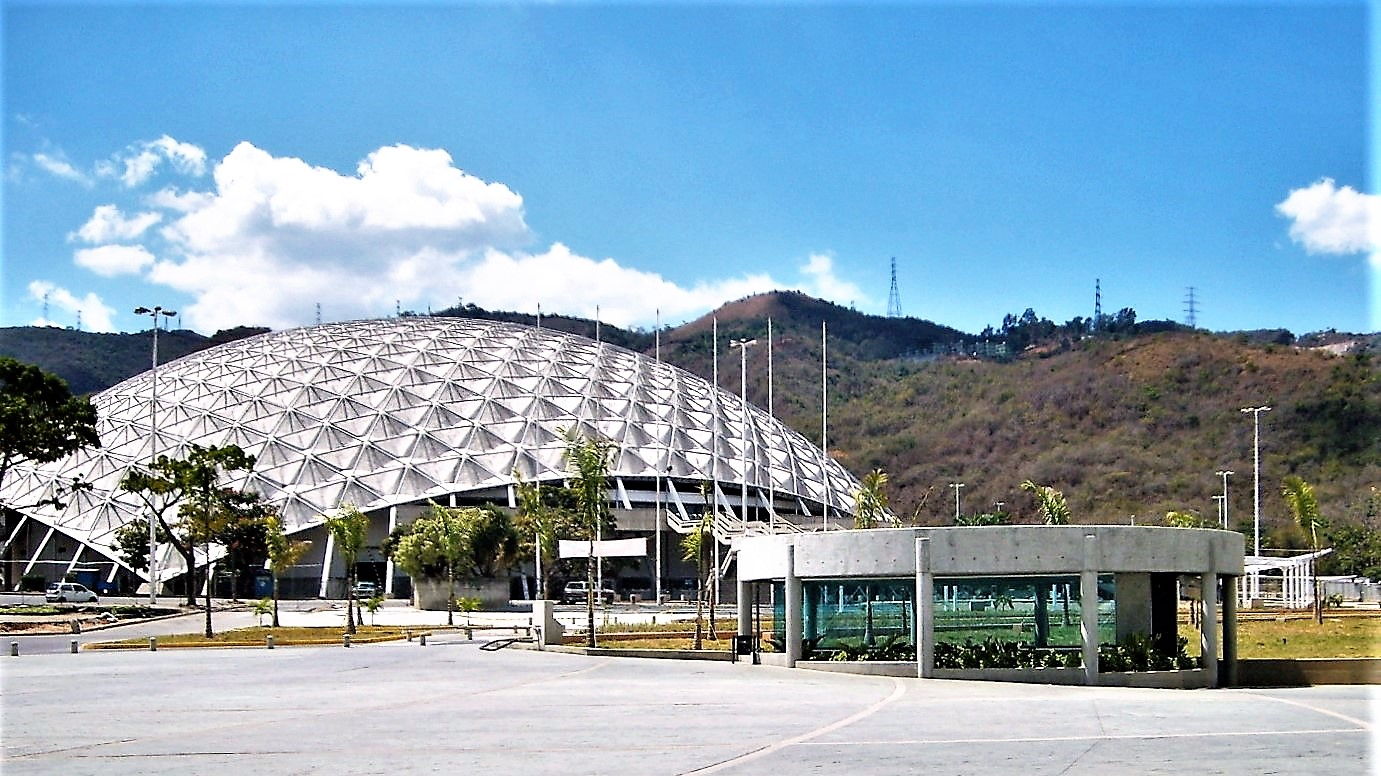

- Country: Venezuela
- Federal district: Distrito Capital
- Municipality: Libertador

Area
  - Total: 13.0 km^{2} (5.0 sq mi)

Population (2011)
  - Total: 79,830
  - Density: 6,140/km^{2} (15,900/sq mi)

Coche is one of the 22 parishes located in the Libertador Bolivarian Municipality and one of 32 of Caracas, Venezuela.
