= El Valle Parish =

El Valle
- Parish
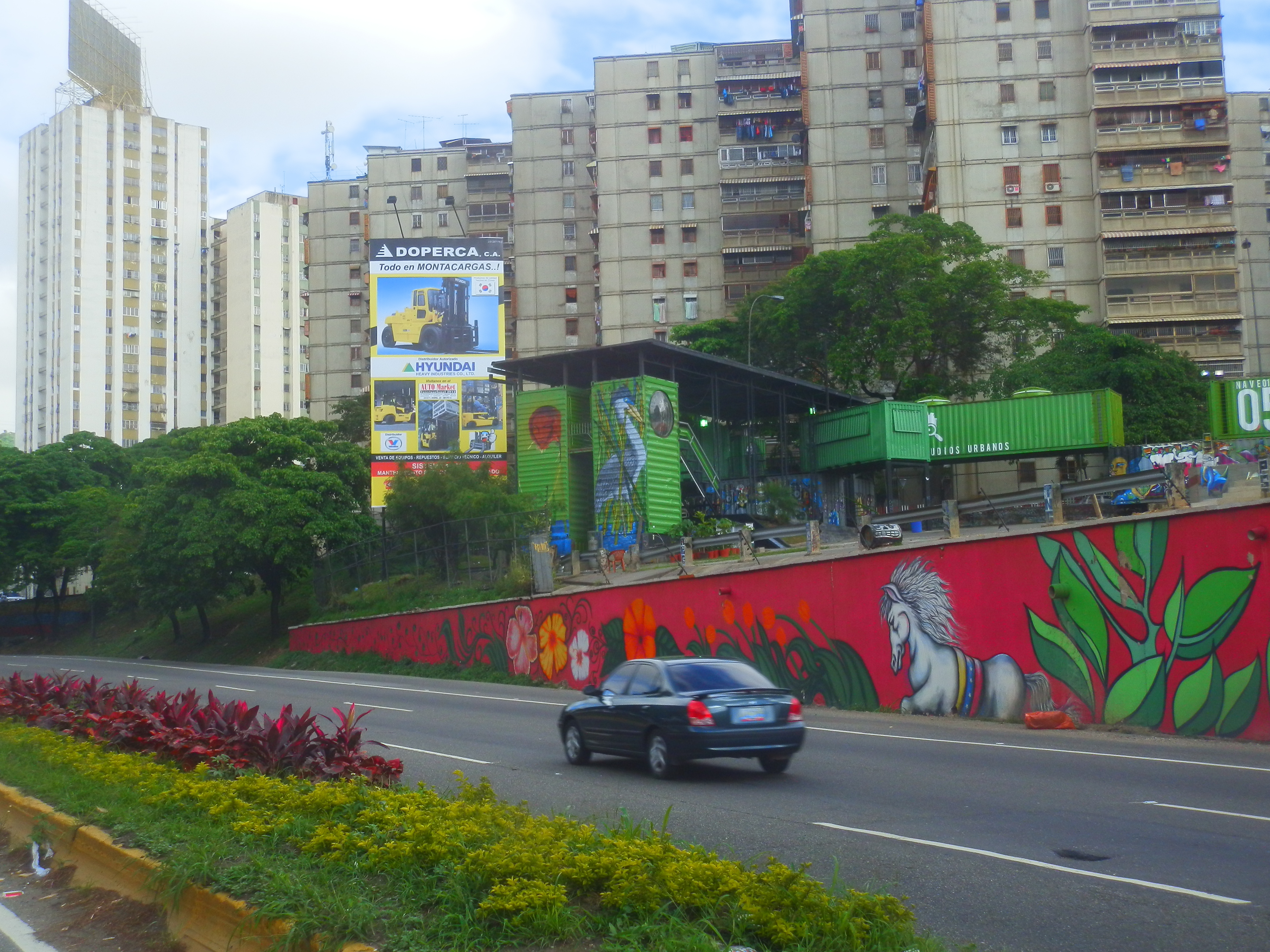

- Coordinates: 10°28′02″N 66°54′26″W
- Country: Venezuela
- Federal district: Distrito Capital
- Municipality: Libertador

Area
  - Total: 31.1 km^{2} (12.0 sq mi)

Population (2011)
  - Total: 231,117
  - Density: 7,430/km^{2} (19,200/sq mi)

El Valle is one of the 22 parishes located in the Libertador Bolivarian Municipality and one of 32 of Caracas, Venezuela.
