= List of urban parishes of Guayaquil =

This is a list of urban parishes in Guayaquil:

- Ayacucho
- Bolívar
- Carbo
- Chongón
- Febres Cordero
- García Moreno
- Letamendi
- Nueve de Octubre
- Pascuales
- Olmedo
- Roca
- Rocafuerte
- Sucre
- Tarqui
- Urdesa
- Ximena
