= Libertador Municipality, Caracas =

Libertador Municipio Bolivariano Libertador
- Municipality
- Libertador Bolivarian Municipality
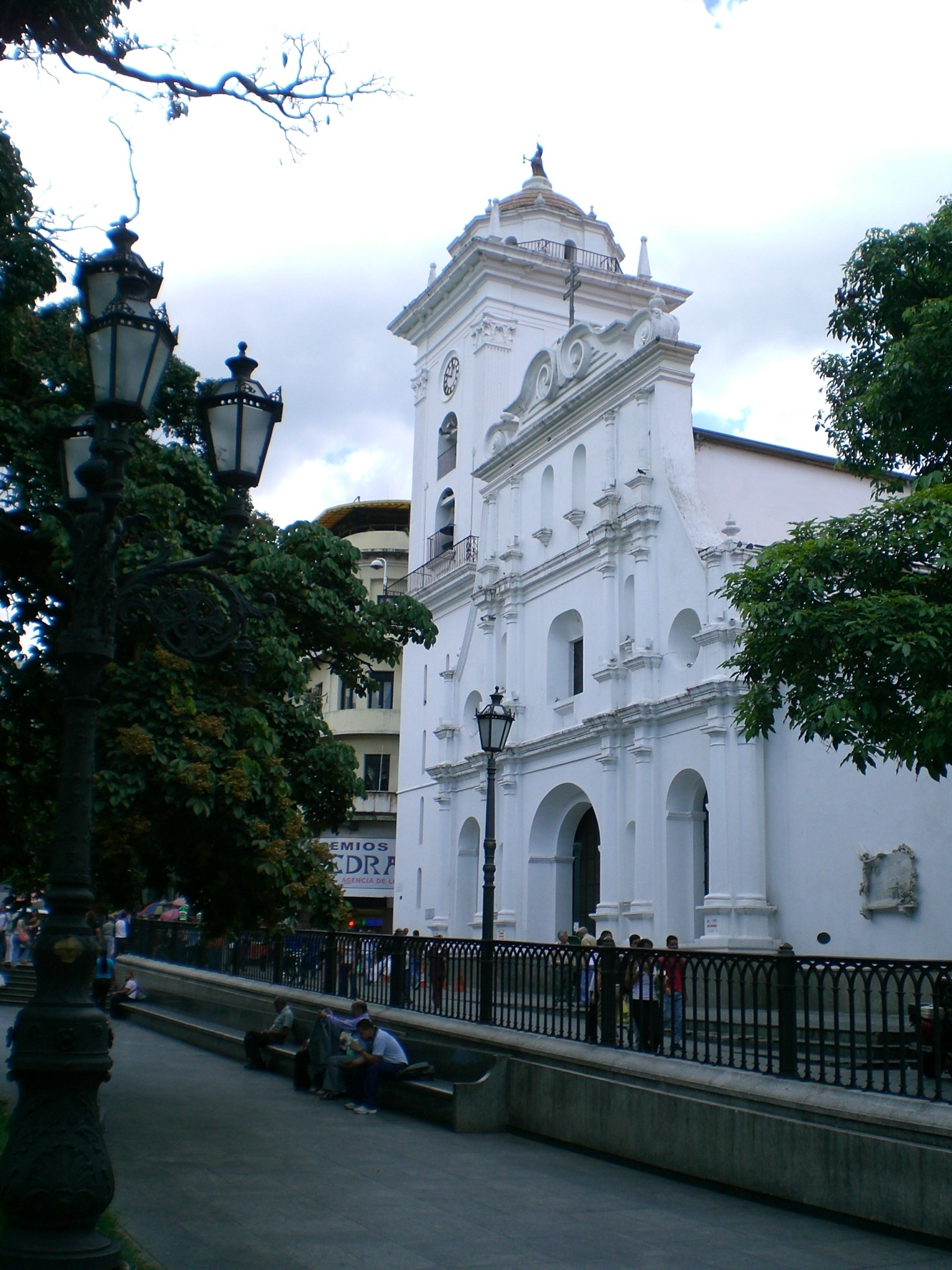
- Caracas Cathedral

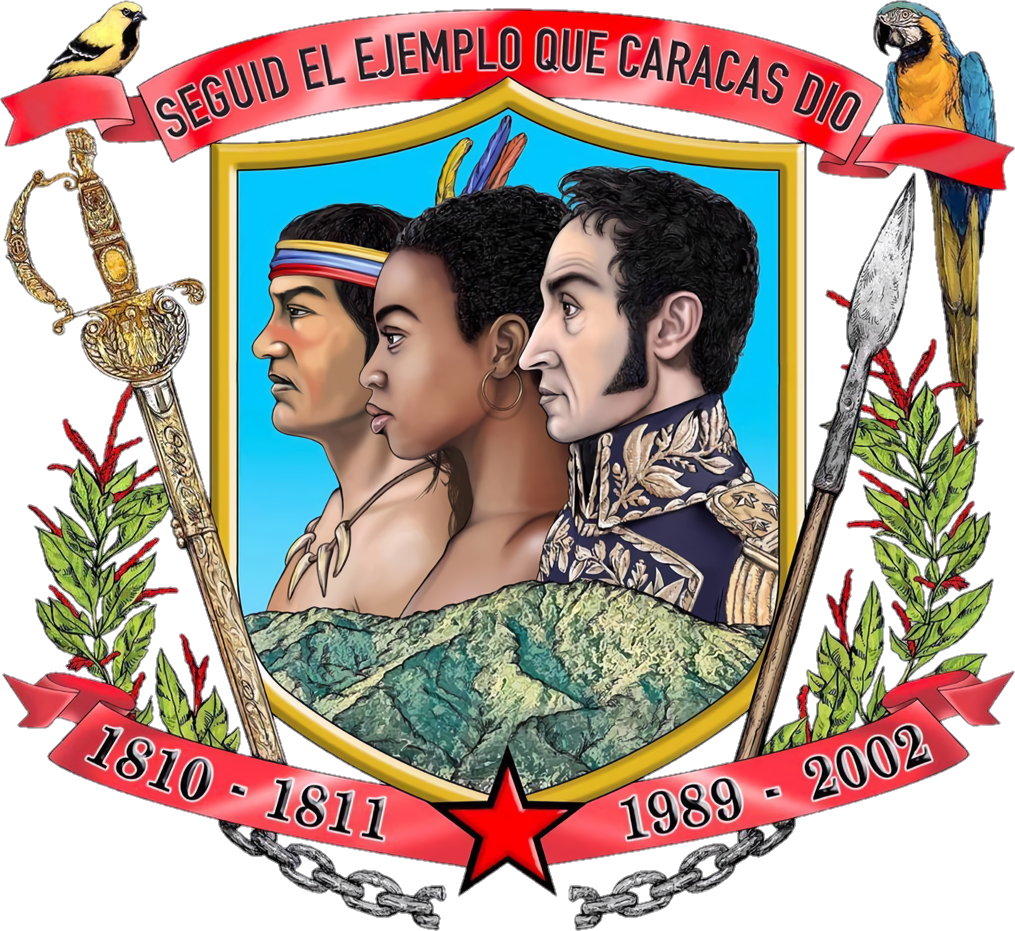
- Flag Coat of arms

- Capital District

- Location within Venezuela
- Coordinates: 10°30′21″N 66°54′52″W
- Country: Venezuela
- State: Capital District
- City: Caracas
- Founded: 25 July 1567

Government
  - Type: Mayor–council
  - Mayor: Carmen Meléndez (PSUV) (PSUV)

Area
  - Total: 433 km^{2} (167 sq mi)

Population (2007)
  - Total: 2,085,488
  - Density: 4,820/km^{2} (12,500/sq mi)
- Time zone: UTC−4 (VET)
- Area code: 212
- ISO 3166 code: VE-A
- Website: http://www.caracas.gob.ve
- The area and population figures are for the municipality.

The Libertador Bolivarian Municipality (Spanish: Municipio Bolivariano Libertador) is the only administrative division of the Capital District of Venezuela and along with the municipalities of Baruta, Chacao, El Hatillo and Sucre forms the Metropolitan District of Caracas. It is landlocked by Vargas State and also borders Miranda State on the east and south. The municipality is one of a number in Venezuela named "Libertador Municipality", in honour of Venezuelan independence hero Simón Bolívar.

Libertador is one of the smallest municipalities in Venezuela, with a total area of 438 square kilometres (169 sq mi). It is the largest in terms of population, with approximately 2.1 million inhabitants.

In this municipality is home to the Miraflores presidential palace, the Federal Legislative Palace, the National Electoral Council, the main offices of PDVSA and CANTV, the Central Bank of Venezuela and the public ministry.

== History ==
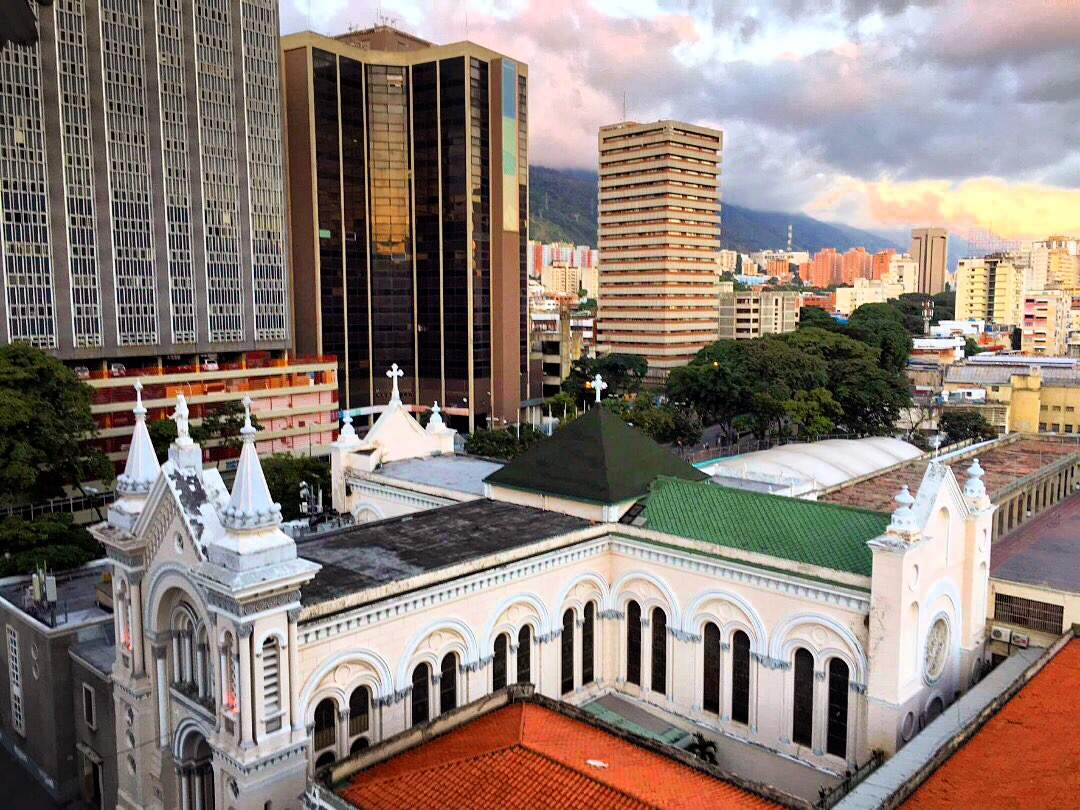
La Candelaria neighborhood in Caracas

It was first established in 1901 under the name of Libertador Department; with the Department of Vargas (now Vargas Municipality, it formed the Federal District of Venezuela.

In 1986, its name was changed to Libertador District. Following the creation of the Vargas State in 1998, it became the sole administrative division of the Federal District.

Under the 1999 constitution, the Federal District ceased to exist and the Capital District was created. Under the new terms of administrative divisions, Libertador became a municipality, consisting of 22 parishes.

In 2000, the Metropolitan District of Caracas was formed from Libertador and four other municipalities: Baruta, Chacao, El Hatillo, and Sucre.

== Geography ==
The Libertador Municipality is located in the mid-north of the country surrounded by the mountain El Ávila which is part of the Venezuelan central range. It borders by the north with the Vargas State, by the south and east with the Baruta Municipality of the Miranda State and by the west with the Aragua State. The Municipality includes the Los Chaguaramos neighborhood.

=== Climate ===
The climate is characteristically tropical with the temperature varying according to the altitude with an annual temperature of 24 to 28 °C (75 to 82 °F) being the warmest of the five municipalities that forms Caracas.

== Economy ==
The vast majority of the population works for the public sector. It is also the most important commercial centre of the country since the Central Bank of Venezuela is located there. Tourism is the next largest economic activity in the municipality as the historical centre of the city is there. Informal commerce is also predominant in the area.

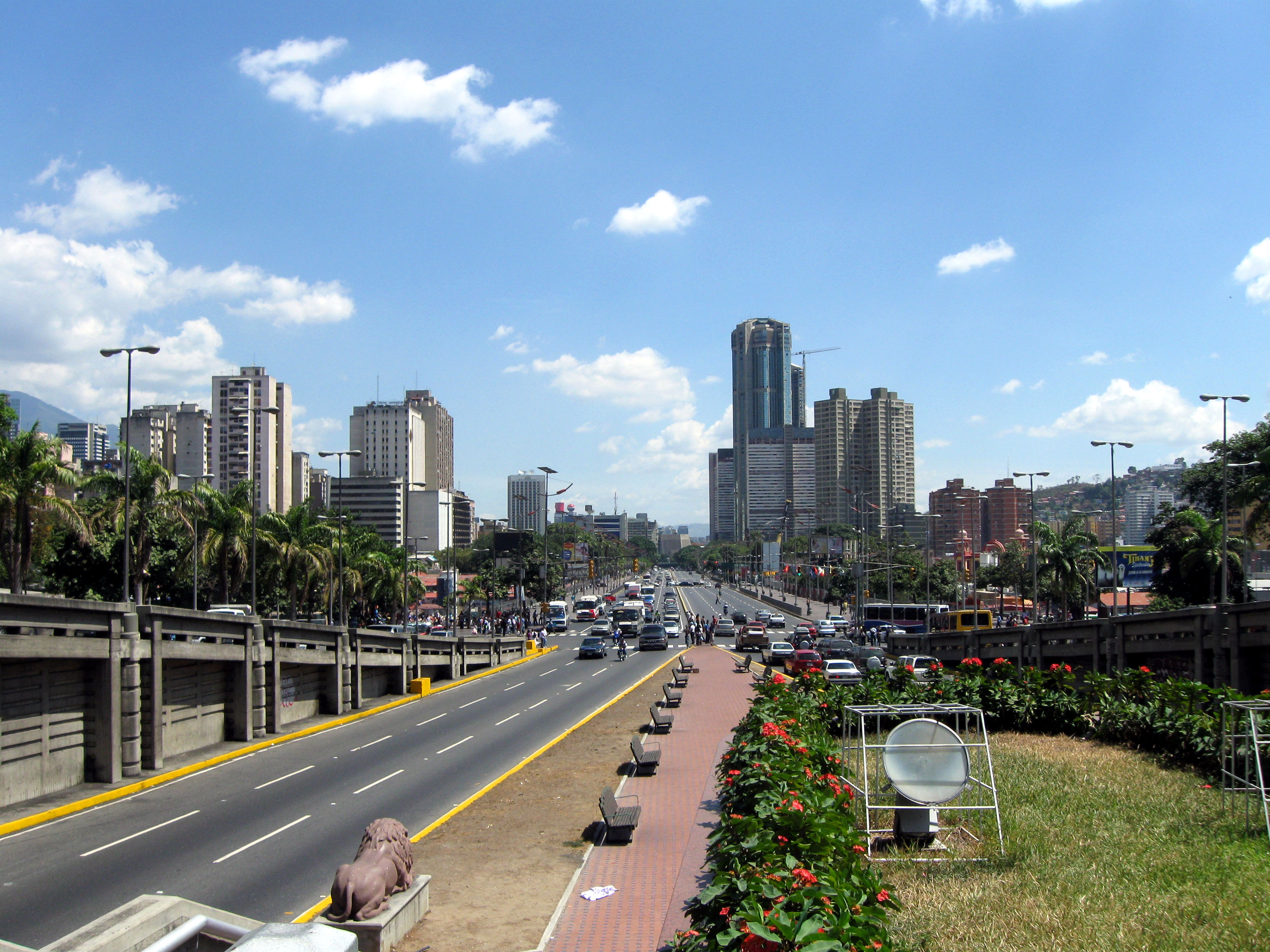
Bolívar Avenue

== Government ==
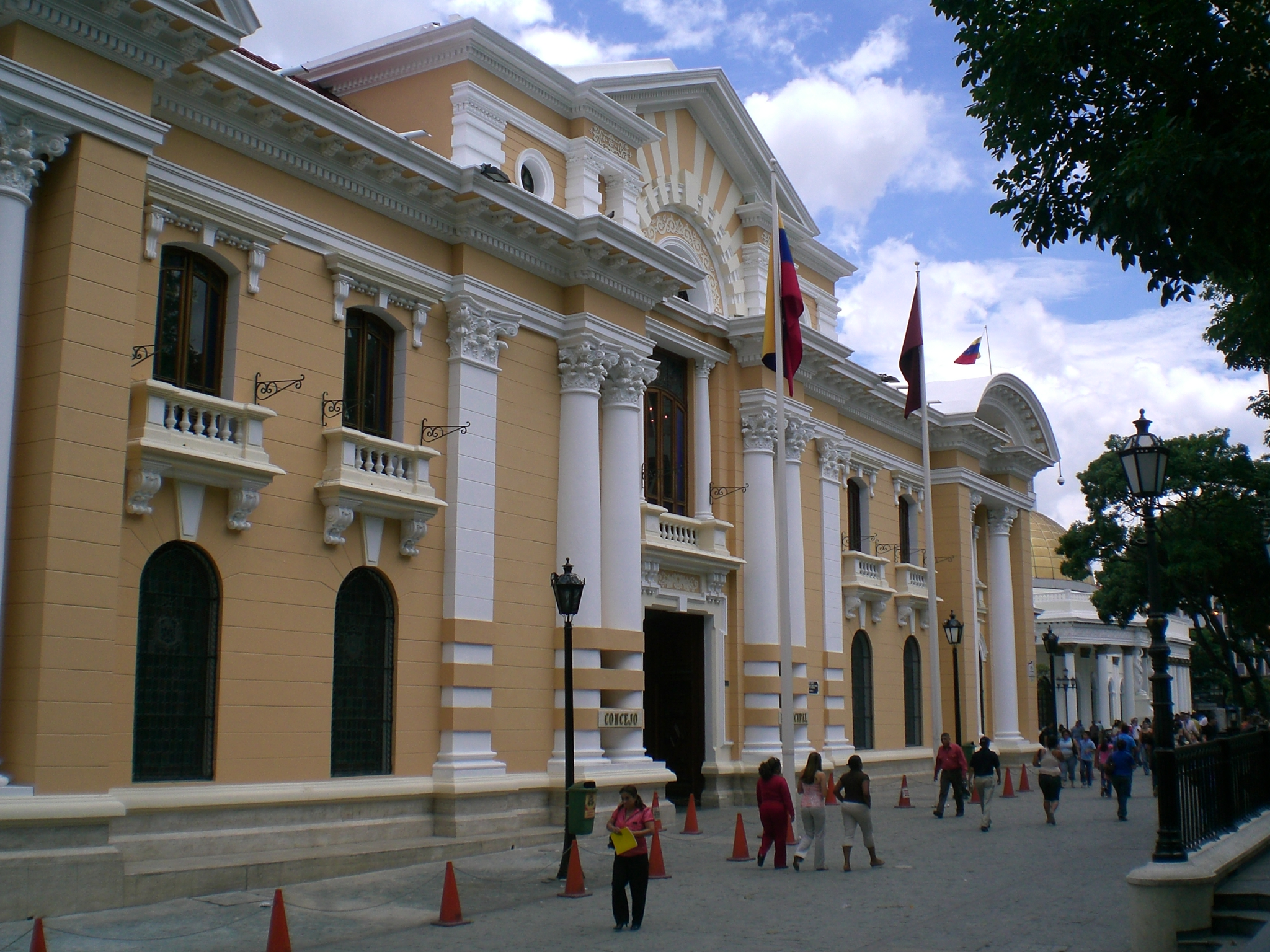
Libertador Municipality City Hall

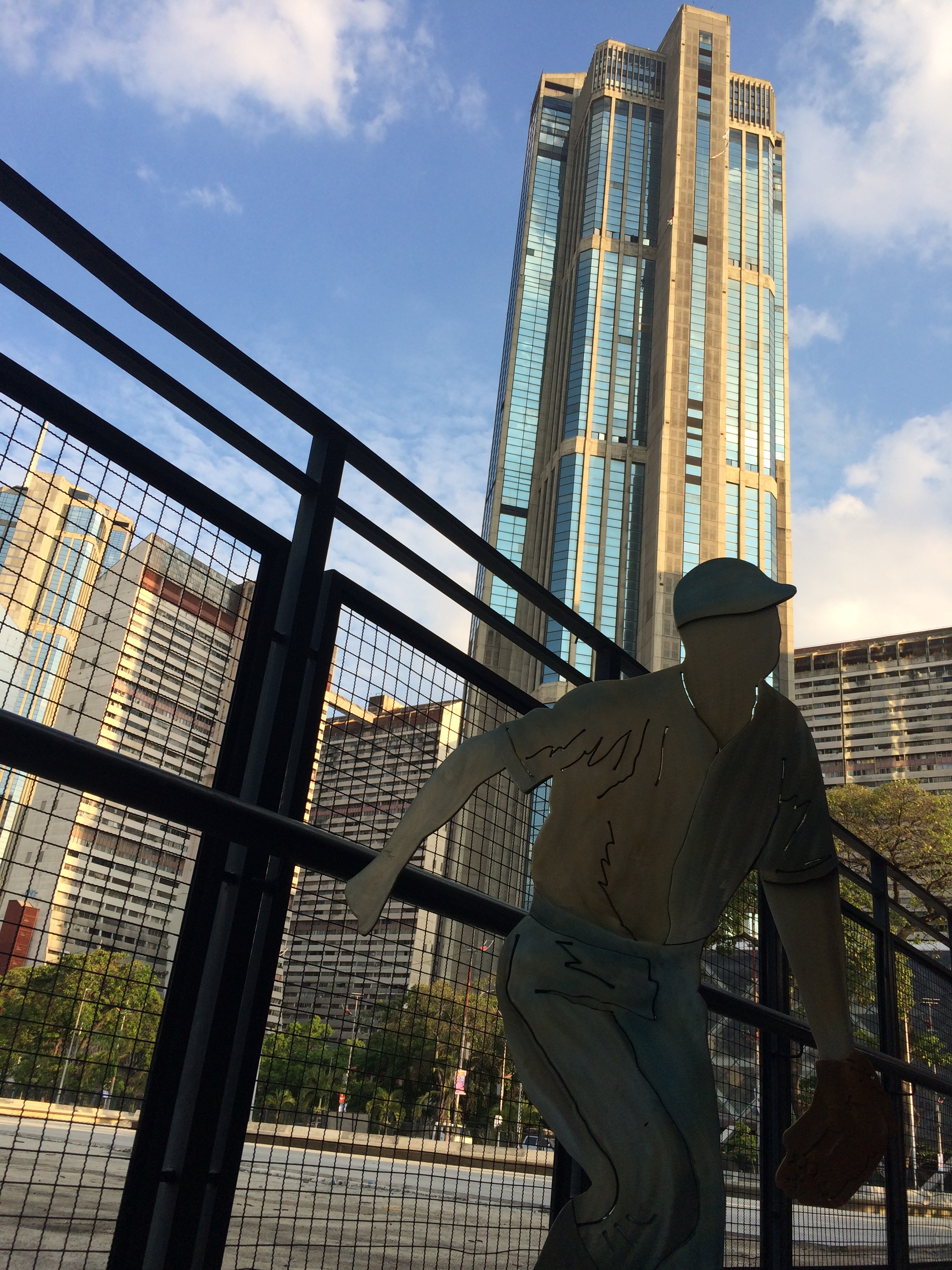
Parque Central Complex from the National Art Gallery

The Venezuelan constitution specifies that the municipal governments are divided by executive; governed by the mayor, and legislative branches; governed by the municipal council comprising thirteen members, both offices are elected through universal and secret suffrage.

The Libertador Municipality does not belong to any state therefore it doesn't have a governor but instead a Head of Government of the Capital District which is appointed by the President of the Republic.

Since August 2009 the municipality publishes a newspaper, Ciudad CCS.

=== Mayors ===
- Claudio Fermín (1989-1992)
- Aristóbulo Istúriz (1992-1995)
- Antonio Ledezma (1995-2000)
- Freddy Bernal (2000-2008)
- Jorge Rodríguez (2008-2017)
- Erika Farías (2017-2021)

=== Parishes ===
The Libertador Municipality comprised 22 parishes out of the 32 that contains Caracas

Parish	Area	Population (2007)
(1) Santa Rosalía	6,68 km²	118.327
(2) El Valle	12,64 km²	152.763
(3) Coche	? km²	57.907
(4) Caricuao	23,83 km²	166.918
(5) Macarao	10,25 km²	50.032
(6) Antímano	20,90 km²	150.971
(7) La Vega	12,64 km²	142.765
(8) El Paraíso	10,79 km²	114.820
(9) El Junquito	52,52 km²	45.398
(10) Sucre	59,30 km²	396.919
(11) San Juan	3,25 km²	101.777
(12) Santa Teresa	0,72 km²	20.641
(13) 23 de enero	2,31 km²	84.650 (2009)
(14) La Pastora	4,47 km²	41.989
(15) Altagracia	? km²	89.670
(16) San José	2,59 km²	39.196
(17) San Bernardino	12,27 km²	26.296
(18) Catedral	0,76 km²	5.479
(19) Candelaria	1,23 km²	62.360
(20) San Agustín	1,59 km²	46.757
(21) El Recreo	18,10 km²	107.051
(22) San Pedro	? km²	62.641

== Demographics ==
The Libertador Municipality represents only 0.22% of the countrywide territory but is home to more than 2 million people and represents half of the total population of Caracas and a density of 4,816.36/km2. On the other hand, the entire area is urbanized.

As of 2006, Libertador was estimated to contain the world's second-largest mega-slum.

== See also ==
- Caracas
- Capital District (Venezuela)
