= Caracas-La Guaira highway =

Highway in Venezuela

Caracas-La Guaira Highway

Location
- Country: Venezuela
- Major cities: Caracas, La Guaira

Highway system
- Highways in Venezuela

The Caracas–La Guaira highway is a highway that connects Caracas, the capital of Venezuela, to its principal port city of La Guaira, capital of the Vargas state. It was designed as an alternative to the old highway linking Caracas with La Guaira, the Carretera Vieja, a circuitous route with dangerous curves and steep drops. The end-to-end journey on the old highway had taken one hour while the new highway allowed the same trip to be made in 20 minutes.

It is the primary route between Caracas and the coast, and it links Caracas with its main international airport, Simón Bolívar International Airport. It was designed and built during the government of Colonel Marcos Pérez Jiménez and the military junta government that preceded it. Construction began in January 1950, and lasted until late 1953, with a cost of 3,500,000 dollars per km at the time, and 60,000,000 dollars on the present.

At the time of its inauguration, the project was considered an engineering masterpiece. It has needed some repairs over the years. However, like the later Guri Dam, it remains one of the most iconic examples of Venezuela's policy of "sowing the oil" (sembrar el petróleo), or using its oil wealth for national development.

== Characteristics ==
Caracas is located in the mountains of the coast 17 km south of La Guaira and the Caribbean Sea, at an altitude of about 936 metres.

The construction of the highway began in January 1950 after six years of studies by the Ministry of Public Works in Venezuela during the military regime by colonel Marcos Pérez Jiménez (1952-1958).

The highway serves as a vital artery linking Caracas with Maiquetia Airport, whose daily turnover is about 200 domestic and international flights, and the port of La Guaira, where it enters about 50% of all of the country's imports. Also, the highway has given momentum to the development of coastal property. With only 36 turns, it reduced the travel time by about 15 minutes. The curves have a minimum radius of 300 m (984 ft), compared with 15 for the current road. The maximum degree of the new road is only 6%, and 3.5% in the tunnels, compared with 12% on the old road. Two tunnels, one of them over 1,910 m (6,266 ft) long, together with the three concrete bridges, trace the path of this four-lane highway linking the capital with the Caribbean.

Two thousand workers and over 200 bulldozers, tractors, and trucks worked to finish the work in time for the Tenth Inter-American Conference of Foreign Ministers, which was to take place in Caracas during the first quarter of 1954. Along with the many Venezuelan workers who worked in the three viaducts were a group of 300 men including immigrant Italians, Germans, Austrians, and Slavs.

The highway was praised by the international media. The United States's gag reel newscast, Movietone News, dedicated a report on the highway.

== Tunnels and viaducts ==
The two highway tunnels were built at a cost of approximately $20,000,000 for the only other foreign company that participated in the project. The company is the Morrison Knudsen Company Inc. of Boise, Idaho, United States.

Each tunnel is actually a set of twin tubes separated by a natural wall of about 12 metres wide, with two lanes of traffic in one direction on each side. The first Boqueron tunnel measures 1,910 m (6,266 ft). The second Boqueron Tunnel measures 497 m (1,631 ft)

The tunnels were designed by Ralph Smillie, head of a consulting engineering company in the city of New York.

The tunnels have a ventilation system that automatically regulates the entry of fresh air in proportion to the concentration of carbon monoxide expelled by motor vehicles. A tunnel along the greater length of 1,780 meters, two galleries were built vertical sites about one-third the length of the underpass. These galleries are raised tunnel about 37 m to the surface of the mountain, and are used to inject fresh air and expel combustion gases coming out of cars that travel.

In addition to more efficient lighting that existed at the time, the tunnels have a system for regulating traffic in case of occurrence of any emergency, as well as a variety of apparatus for firefighting.

At the north end of the tunnel will be built a smaller building to house the equipment that will control the ventilation and traffic regulation. The tunnel will have more buildings at both ends, which are now installed automatic controls of the twin tunnels.

A house, central control, was built near the side of the tunnel Greater Caracas, where electrical panels were installed specifically designed to regulate the ventilation lighting, traffic, and warning signs of both tunnels. In this building, there is always ready to guard crews clear the highway tunnels and of any accident or interruption that may occur.

== Viaducts ==
One of the viaducts along the route, known as Viaduct #1, was plagued by landslides from the 1980s onward. During the 1967 Caracas earthquake, it suffered severe deformations due to the displacement of the hill and the failure of Gramoven Tacagua. The bases of the supports shifted toward the centre of the span, causing the supports to crack and the span to buckle upward. Venezuelan governments made constant repairs to strengthen the supports and stabilize the span, but did not develop a long-term solution. The government closed the highway as a safety precaution on 5 January 2006. The sudden isolation of Caracas from the coast prompted political accusations by the opposition against Hugo Chávez's government, and by Chávez supporters against previous governments' failure to deal with the problem. A narrow and steep detour around the viaduct opened on February 28, and the viaduct span fell on March 19. Construction began in March 2006 on a replacement viaduct, which opened on 21 June 2007.

The current Viaduct 1 has a length of 900 m (2,953 ft). Viaduct 2 has a length of 270 m (886 ft). Viaduct 3 has a length of 215 m (705 ft).

== Future developments ==
As well as replacing the old highway, the highway replaced the La Guaira and Caracas Railway, which had been opened in the 19th century. It has been suggested that there is scope for constructing a modern railway serving this route.
