= Parishes of Venezuela =

Venezuela is a federal state that is divided into states, and these into autonomous municipalities and these in turn into parishes. In total, the country has 1,136 parishes that make up the 335 municipalities (integrated of the 23 states and the Capital District).

There are a total of 1,136 parishes in Venezuela, the state with the most parishes is Zulia with 110 and the one with the fewest parishes is La Guaira State with 11. The municipality with the most parishes in the Capital District is the Libertador Municipality with 22 parishes; the municipality with the most parishes among the states is the Maracaibo Municipality of the state of Zulia with 18. The Gran Sabana parish, located in the Gran Sabana municipality in the state of Bolívar with 29,305 km² is considered the largest in the country, in contrast, the Santa Teresa parish belonging to the Libertador municipality of the Capital District is the smallest with 0.8 km² equivalent to 80 hectares.

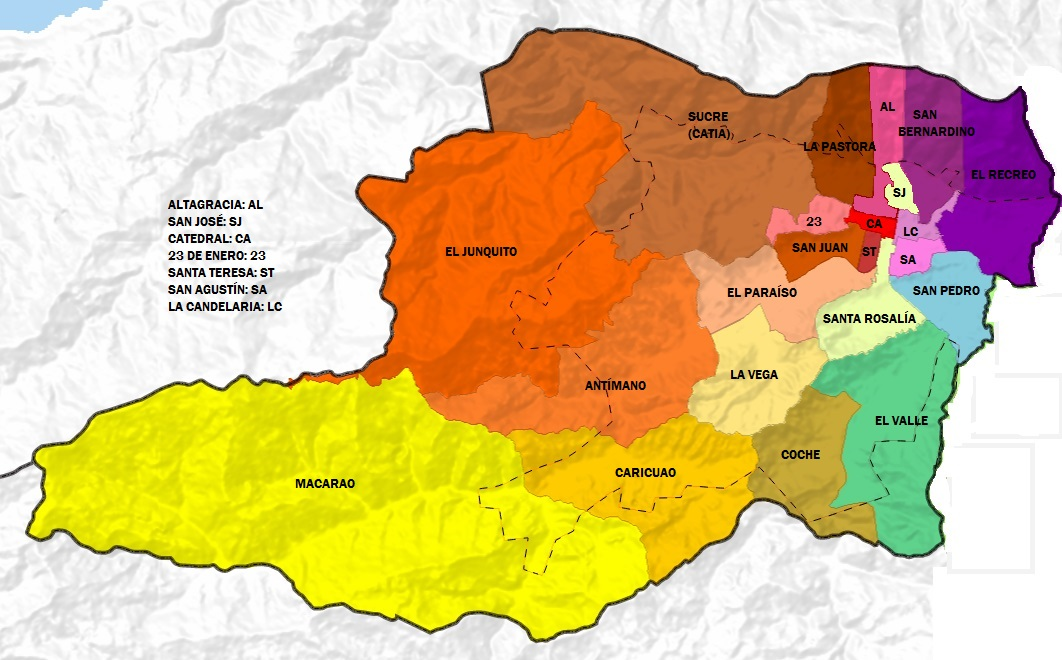
Parishes of the Libertador Municipality of Caracas

In Venezuela parishes are the lowest-ranking political-territorial unit, where the municipalities are divided, the administrative division is directed by a prefect (appointed by the municipal mayor), in addition the parish is constitutionally composed of a parish board. Since the elections of 1992 the citizens directly elected the representatives of the parish boards, in 2005 for the first time elections were held to elect the parish boards separately from those of governor and mayor, since that date no more parish elections have been held with the intention of replacing them with the communal parish boards.

== Usage as electoral districts ==
The councilors who make up the municipal legislative power are elected by parish as a representation of each parish of the municipality, the councilors elected by list represent the entire municipality, the electoral circuits vary, usually one councilor is elected per 20,000 inhabitants.

== Urban and rural parishes ==
Parishes can be classified as urban parishes if they have at least 50,000 inhabitants, in which case they can choose 5 members of the parish board (a president, a secretary and 3 members), the territory of urban parishes is dedicated to housing development and industry and trade activities.

Rural parishes have less than 50,000 inhabitants, these elect 3 members of the parish board (a president, a secretary and a member) and their territory will be dedicated to agricultural production, or as a nature reserve. The same municipality can have both types of parish or only one of the two.

Parishes have the express power to manage the following matters and processes:

- Serve as a center for information, production and promotion of participatory processes for the identification of budgetary priorities.
- Promote the principles of co-responsibility, protagonism and citizen participation in municipal public management.
- Promote services and the principle of co-responsibility in the face of citizen security, civil protection and the integral defense of Venezuela.
- Promote services and policies aimed at children, adolescents, the elderly and people with disabilities.
- Promote, organize, coordinate, supervise and carry out the electoral processes for the election of justices of the peace.
- Promote community processes of social comms.
- Protect the environment and strengthen the areas of the natural parks, in coordination with the entity responsible for the park and in accordance with the guidelines indicated by the authorities of the municipality.
- Ensure compliance with urban cleaning and home cleaning.
- Supervise drinking water, electricity and domestic gas services.
- Contribute to the care and maintenance of squares, parks and gardens in the parish.
- Inspect the provision of the public passenger transport service.
- The president of the parish board may celebrate marriages and keep the record of them, within the corresponding territorial scope, in accordance with the parameters established in the Civil Code.
- Promote and promote sports massification.
- Sponsor and promote cultural activities that integrate the community.
- Contribute with local tax administrations in the management of taxes, in order to ensure compliance with tax obligations and other formal duties.
- Support the technical room of the local council of public planning in the preparation of the municipal social census, together with the participation of neighborhood organizations and organized society.
- Cooperate in the supervision of the performance of public shows, in accordance with the provisions of the respective ordinance.
- Cooperate with the corresponding local authorities in the management of cemetery services and municipal markets and collect the tax duties and fees provided for in the respective ordinance, when it comes to non-urban parishes.
- Process requests from individuals regarding plots of municipal land and social services.
- Other powers delegated by the mayor, in accordance with the municipal legal instruments.

== History ==
The colonial provinces did not have subdivisions as such but a hierarchy of city, town, village and hamlet, according to the importance of the population, classifying each one according to its main square, town hall, cathedral and a fortification, a population devoid of all that was a hamlet. The cities with their cabildos had mayors and represented the interests of the surrounding neighborhood, it was the cabildos that signed the independence of Venezuela in 1811.

- The constitution of 1819 resulting from the congress of Angostura, fixed the territorial division of Venezuela into provinces, departments and parishes.
- The constitution of 1821 changed the territorial order to departments, provinces, cantons, and parishes.
- The constitution of 1830 left the division into provinces, cantons and parishes. The parishes of 1830 did contain the functions of the current ones while the cantons occupied the place of the municipalities.
- The constitution of 1864 used the names of states, districts and municipalities.
- The 1909 constitution divided the country into states, districts and municipalities.
- The 1947 constitution and the following ones established the division into states, districts and municipalities, however the municipalities of the 1961 constitution exercised the functions of the current parishes.
- In 1988 the reform of the territorial organization of Venezuela was completed so that all local authorities were directly elected, these elections were held in 1989 appointing the first governors, mayors and councilors elected by popular vote. In 1989, most of the current parishes were created, although it was in 1992 when they first had authorities elected by popular vote.
- Since 1989 the number of parishes has increased, by division of the original ones, while others have been elevated to municipality (and subdivided into new parishes) or several parishes have been grouped to form new municipalities.

== Symbols ==
Normally the parishes do not have symbols since their function is administrative, however some parishes by tradition or by initiative have their own symbols such as those of the Lobatera Municipality of the Táchira state, which have ancestral flags and shields and the flag of the municipality is a combination of the parish flags. The San José parish of the Libertador Municipality of Caracas also has an ancestral parish shield. Other parishes with a flag are the Seque Parish, Borojó Parish and Capatárida Parish of the Buchivacoa Municipality of the Falcón State and the José Gregorio Bastidas Parish of the Palavecino Municipality of the Lara State. In Táchira, the Parish of Bramón in the Junín Municipality, has a flag, shield and even an anthem, which are different from those of Junín and more typical of the Brameños, this parish being the most recent to create its own symbols.
