= Capital District (Venezuela) =

Federal district of Venezuela

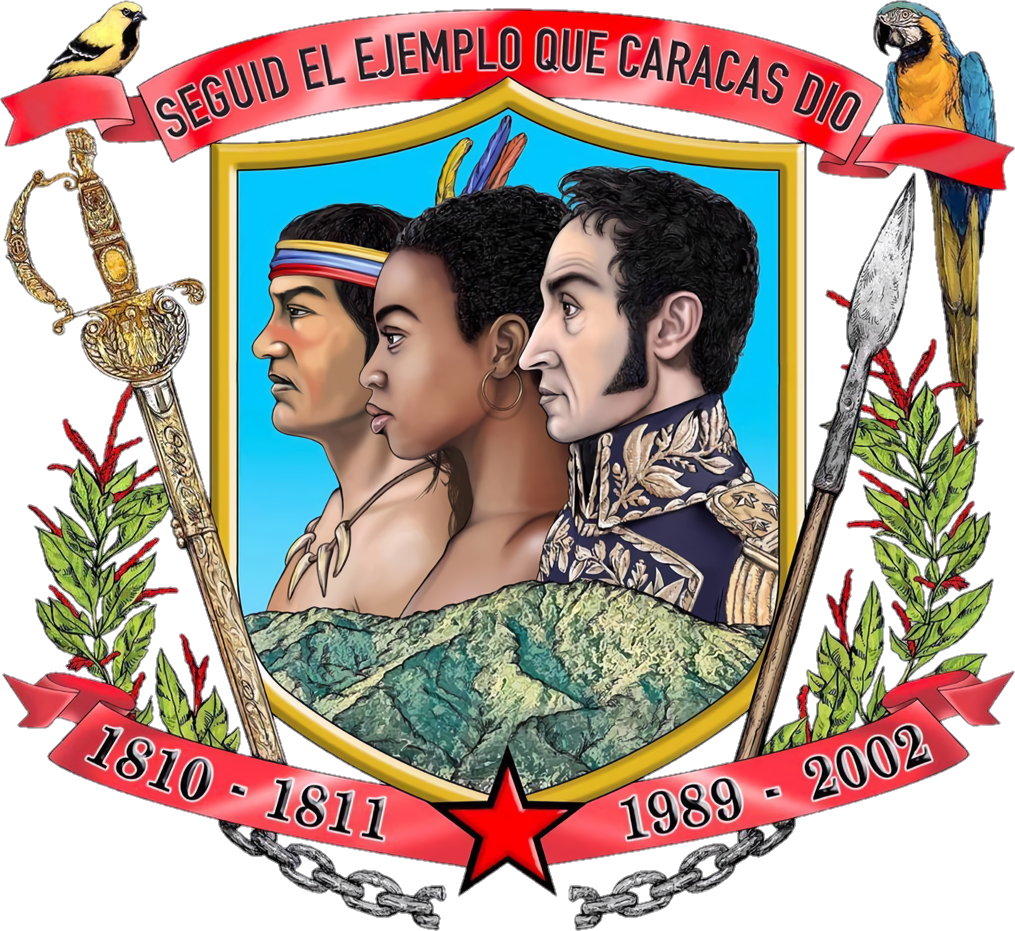
- Flag Coat of arms

- Coordinates: 10.473056°N 66.995556°W
- Country: Venezuela
- Capital: Caracas

Government
  - Head of Government of the Capital District: Nahum Fernández (PSUV)

Area
  - Total: 433 km^{2} (167 sq mi)

Population (2020)
  - Total: 3,523,959
  - Density: 8,140/km^{2} (21,100/sq mi)
- HDI (2019): 0.757 high · 1st
- Website: https://www.gdc.gob.ve

The Capital District (Spanish: Distrito Capital) is a federal district of Venezuela. It has an area of 433 km^{2} (167 sq mi) and there is only one administrative division (municipio), Libertador, which contains about half of Caracas, the Venezuelan capital city, which is also the seat of the three branches of the federal government of Venezuela. The population in 2004 was 2,073,768. The district borders the states of Vargas and Miranda.

== Government ==
Formerly it had its own local government with a governor, but the constitutional reform of 1999 abolished the district government and created instead the Metropolitan District of Caracas, with jurisdiction over the territory of the District and also four adjacent municipios (Baruta, Chacao, el Hatillo and Sucre) in Miranda which all together form the city.

On 13 April 2009, the National Assembly passed a law creating the figure of a head of government for the district which would be designated by the President. On 14 April 2009, Jacqueline Faría became the first Head of Government of the Capital District. During the 2017 Venezuelan protests, General Antonio José Benavides Torres of the National Guard was appointed to be the Head of Government of the Capital District by disputed President Maduro.

== Municipality ==
- Libertador (Caracas)

== Demographics ==
=== Race and ethnicity ===
According to the 2011 Census, the racial composition of the population was:

Racial composition	Population	%
White	1,079,892	51.2
Mestizo	—N/a	44.3
Black	69,602	3.3
Other races	—N/a	1.2

== See also ==
- States of Venezuela
