= San Jacinto, Bolívar =

- Municipality and town
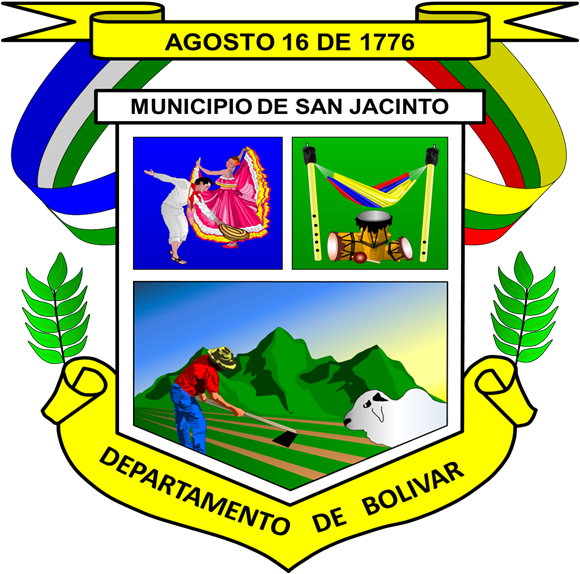
- Flag Coat of arms

- Location of the municipality and town of San Jacinto, Bolívar in the Bolívar Department of Colombia
- Coordinates: 9°49′52″N 75°7′19″W
- Country: Colombia
- Department: Bolívar Department
- Founded: 1776

Area
  - Municipality and town: 442.9 km^{2} (171.0 sq mi)
  - Urban: 3.95 km^{2} (1.53 sq mi)

Population (2018 census)
  - Municipality and town: 23,576
  - Density: 53.23/km^{2} (137.9/sq mi)
  - Urban: 20,771
  - Urban density: 5,260/km^{2} (13,600/sq mi)
- Time zone: UTC-5 (Colombia Standard Time)

San Jacinto is a town and municipality located in the Bolívar Department, northern Colombia.

The San Jacinto archaeological site is located near the town.

== Culture ==
San Jacinto is the most important town in northern Colombia for local, traditional woven textiles such as hammocks and clothing as well as handicrafts. The town the birthplace of musician Adolfo Pacheco, and of the Latin Grammy Award winner cumbia group Los Gaiteros de San Jacinto.

== Notable people ==
- Yohana Rodríguez Sierra (1980/1981–2026), one of the two civilian casualties during the 2026 United States intervention in Venezuela; grew up in San Jacinto.
