= Clemencia, Bolívar =

Coordinates: 10°35′N 75°20′W

Clemencia
- Municipality and town
- Flag

- Location of the municipality and town of Clemencia in the Bolívar Department of Colombia
- Country: Colombia
- Department: Bolívar Department

Area
  - Total: 235 km^{2} (91 sq mi)

Population (Census 2018)
  - Total: 13,821
  - Density: 58.8/km^{2} (152/sq mi)
- Time zone: UTC-5 (Colombia Standard Time)

Clemencia is a town and municipality located in the Bolívar Department, northern Colombia.

== Notable people ==
- Yohana Rodríguez – street vendor residing in Venezuela when she was killed in an airstrike in El Hatillo Municipality during the 2026 United States intervention in Venezuela.
