= Death of Yohana Rodríguez =

Colombian woman and war casualty

Yohana Rodríguez
- Rodríguez in an undated family photo
- Born: Yohana Rodríguez Sierra; Cartagena, Bolívar, Colombia
- Died: 3 January 2026 (aged 45); El Hatillo Municipality, Miranda, Venezuela
- Cause of death: Projectile strike
- Occupation: Street seller
- Known for: Civilian casualty in the 2026 United States intervention in Venezuela
- Children: 3

Yohana Rodríguez Sierra (died 3 January 2026) was a Colombian street vendor and one of the two civilian deaths in the 2026 United States intervention in Venezuela. Rodríguez, who lived in Venezuela with her daughter, was killed by a US strike in El Hatillo Municipality during the US operations to capture President Nicolás Maduro.

== Background ==
Yohana Rodríguez Sierra was born in Cartagena, Bolívar Department, Colombia, in 1980 or 1981. She grew up between Cartagena and rural communities in Bolívar Department, including San Jacinto and Clemencia. Rodríguez Sierra had three children, with two of them living in Cali and in Spain at the time of her death. Her daughter, 22-year-old Ana Corina Morales Sierra, lived with her in El Hatillo Municipality, a district in the State of Miranda, where they had moved more than 12 years earlier. According to Rodríguez's relatives, she was an independent worker who had raised her three children alone as a single mother.

Rodríguez and her daughter planned to travel to Colombia in December 2025 to celebrate Ana Corina's graduation as a nurse, as well as spend Christmas there; however, one of their relatives said to Radio Nacional de Colombia the tensions between the United States and Venezuela made them postpone the trip to Colombia to February. At the time of her death, Rodríguez was living in a country house in El Hatillo.

== Death ==
"They’re attacking us, my mom is already dead, cousin. I don’t know when we’ll see each other again, I don’t know what’s happening."

— Ana Corina Morales Sierra, daughter of Yohanda Rodríguez, in a message to her cousin Ana Lucía Frías in Colombia.

On 3 January 2026, the United States launched a military strike on Venezuela to capture President Nicolás Maduro and his wife, Cilia Flores. As part of the operation, the United States Air Force bombed telecommunication towers and radio antennas across Venezuela to disrupt any response by Venezuelan forces.

According to Ana Corina's testimony, she and her mother were sleeping when an explosion violently woke them up. Both Yohana and Ana Corina were injured in that first strike. They were seeking shelter from the bombings when a second projectile struck the ranch, fatally hitting Yohana and wounding Ana Corina. Rodríguez was hit in her back, while Ana Corina sustained an injury to one of her legs.

While waiting for first responders to arrive, Ana Corina sent a message to a cousin in Colombia, informing her of the attacks and that Yohana was dead. When the ambulance reached the country house, mother and daughter were taken to hospital, with Yohana succumbing to her injuries before receiving medical attention. Ana Corina was treated for her injury and remained hospitalized.

Yohana Rodríguez Sierra was one of two civilian casualties during the United States strikes in Venezuela, which resulted in the capture of Maduro and his wife.

== Reactions ==
The death of Yohana Rodríguez received widespread condemnation in her native Colombia, with president Gustavo Petro posting a long statement on X (formerly known as Twitter). Petro condemned the killing and those in Colombia who celebrated the strikes, saying that those who applauded the operation wanted to be a "colony of the North" and "kneel before (a) king because (they) want to enslave Colombia and murder their own people, as they are used to doing". Petro also addressed US president Donald Trump, whom he accused of "murdering a Colombian mother" under illegal orders, further stating that Trump has "already killed many Colombians".

Miguel Samir Barris, the mayor of Clemencia, Bolívar, where Rodríguez hailed from, lamented her death and expressed relief that her daughter was out of danger. Samir Barris also conveyed sympathies for the "brotherly country" of Venezuela.

Rodríguez's relatives in Colombia condemned her killing, saying that the US acted consciously, but "without (any) respect for civilians, sovereignty, and life". One of Rodríguez's relatives said that they did not understand why the US had "attacked civilian places" when they already knew where to locate Maduro, alleging that United States "want(ed) to exercise its power without any respect nor human conscience".

Marlene Sierra Olivera, a 77-year-old aunt of Rodríguez, said that she was shocked to learn of her niece's death, adding that she "didn't deserve (this) to happen". The aunt also recalled Rodríguez as a "playful" woman who was special to her, being the only in the family to visit them in Clemencia. Another relative angrily said that they will not be able to bring her body back to Colombia due to the volatile situation in Venezuela. Rodríguez's neighbors and friends in rural Bayunca, San Jacinto and Clemencia, expressed condolences to the family, remembering Rodríguez as "noble, hard-working, and a fighter".

Rodríguez's sons in Cali and in Spain were not allowed to enter Venezuela due to security risks.
