= Putinisation =

Movement from liberal democracy toward Putinism

Putinisation, a term popularised by Martin Schulz, a former president of the European Parliament, is a perceived movement away from liberal democracy in certain Eastern European countries in imitation of the regime of Vladimir Putin in Russia. The process of reforming from an authoritarian rule to a liberal democracy is known as deputinisation.

== Background ==
=== Poland ===
In January 2016, Schulz used the term to characterise the Constitutional Court crisis then engulfing Poland, warning of a "dangerous Putinisation of European politics". This referred to actions by the ruling Polish Law and Justice (PiS) attempts to change the makeup and voting rules of the Constitutional Court. Protesters against the reforms carried banners reading “We say no to being Putinized!” The BBC's Newsnight programme subsequently broadcast a segment asking 'Is Poland being Putinised?' which drew complaints from the Polish Foreign Ministry. Claims of "Putinisation" in Poland have been controversial, unlike for other right-wing populist parties in Europe, due to PiS having long-time anti-Russian policy stances.

=== Beyond Poland ===
The term has also been used to describe the national populist regime of Hungary's Viktor Orbán and the attempts by Turkey's President Recep Tayyip Erdoğan to increase the power of the presidency. It has also been applied to an "intensifying campaign" against human rights organisations in Israel by the government of Benjamin Netanyahu.

The Georgian Human Rights Centre has complained of the "Putinization" of media outlets in Georgia in the mid 2000s.

Piotr Pietrzak uses the term "Putinization" to describe the phenomenon of the spread of authoritarianism and the erosion of democracy in countries influenced by Russian foreign policy. He argues that Putinization is a deliberate strategy employed by Russia to expand its sphere of influence and undermine democratic norms and institutions in other countries.

In his analysis, Pietrzak identifies several tactics used by Russia to promote Putinization, including the spread of disinformation and propaganda, the use of economic pressure and influence, and support for anti-democratic forces and leaders.

Following the 2026 United States strikes in Venezuela and consequent capture of Venezuelan president Nicolás Maduro, The Guardian writer David Rothkopf described United States president Donald Trump's conduct as the "Putinization of US foreign policy."

== Deputinisation ==
=== Russia ===
Since the 2022 Russian invasion of Ukraine, the concept of deputinising Russia has become more recognised and advocated for. Specifically, it entails putting an end to Putin's political influence completely, demilitarising Russia, and reducing the power of Russian oligarchs. Petro Poroshenko, the former president of Ukraine, has called for the world to "stop Russian exports not only in the EU, UK, and US, but also in other nations."

=== Beyond Russia ===
Latvian minister Artis Pabriks has suggested that all of Europe must deputinise to "break free from Russia's influence," beginning with Ukraine joining the European Union.

== See also ==
- Democratic backsliding – Drift towards authoritarianism
- Illiberal democracy – System of governance
- Populism – Political ideology emphasising the "common people"
- Putinism – Political system in Russia under Vladimir Putin
- Russia under Vladimir Putin – Government of Russia since 1999
