= 2026 United States intervention in Venezuela =

Airstrikes and capture of Nicolás Maduro

Operation Absolute Resolve
- Part of Operation Southern Spear, the Crisis in Venezuela, and the war on drugs
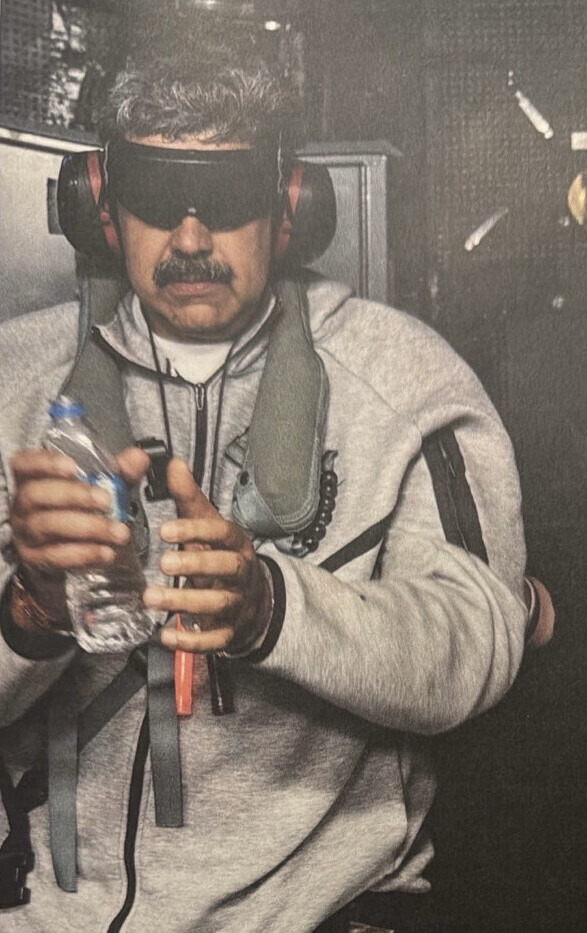
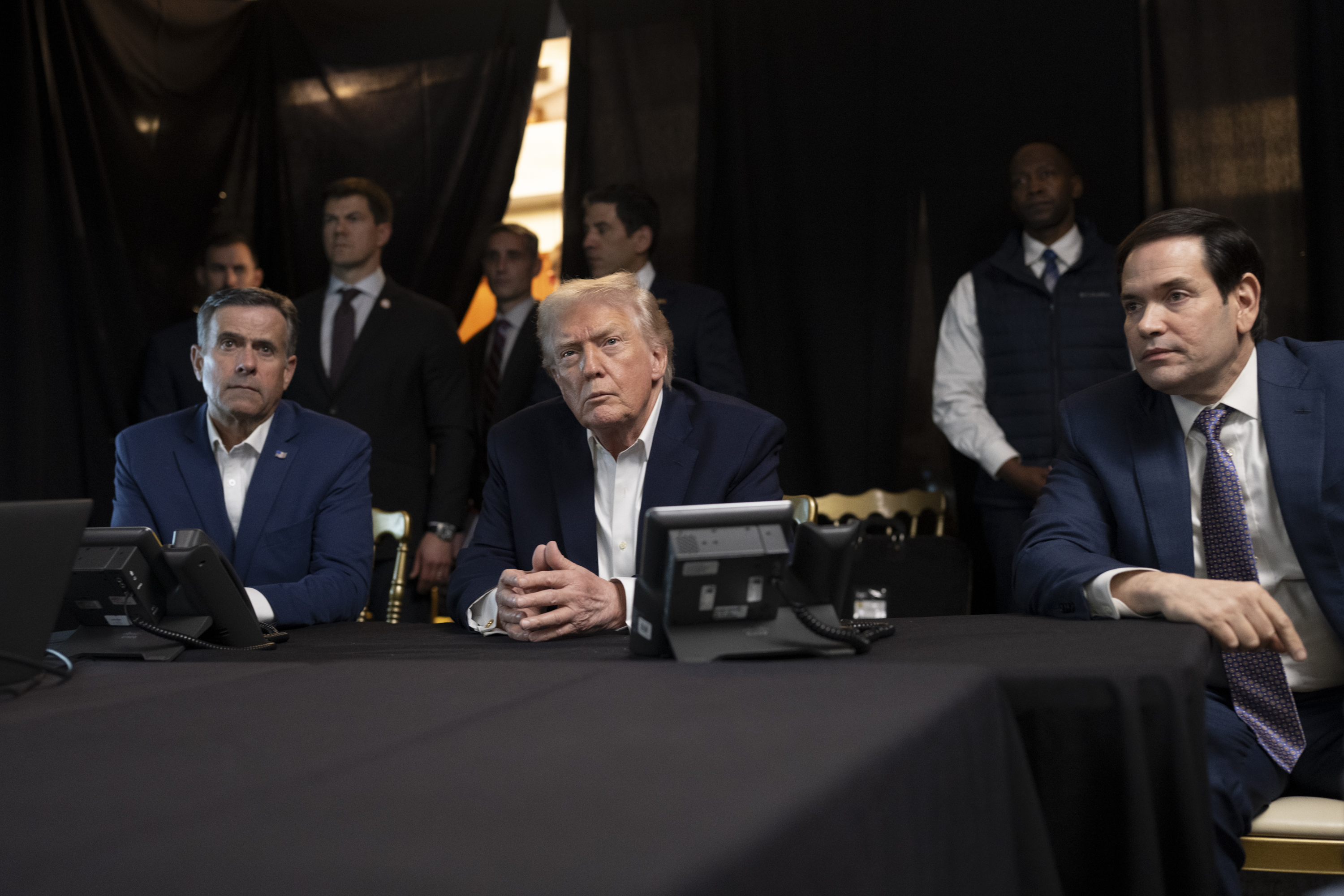
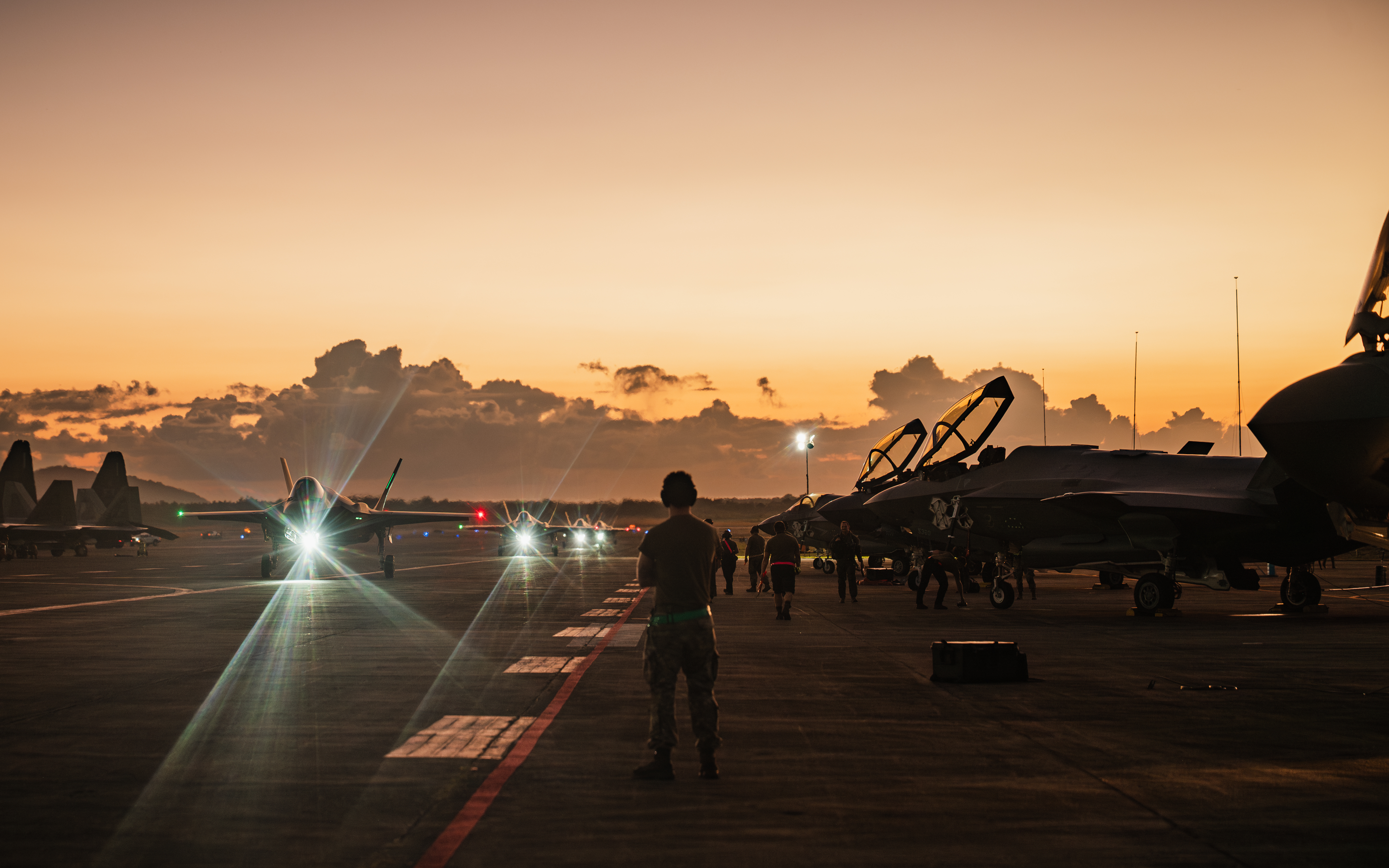
- Venezuelan president Nicolás Maduro aboard USS Iwo Jima following his capture (left); US president Donald Trump with members of his cabinet at Mar-a-Lago during Operation Absolute Resolve (right); US F-35A jets at Roosevelt Roads Naval Station following the operation (bottom)
- Location: Northern Venezuela, including Greater Caracas
- Planned by: United States Department of Defense
- Commanded by: Donald Trump; Pete Hegseth; Dan Caine
- Objective: Capture of President Nicolás Maduro
- Date: 3 January 2026; 02:01 – 04:29 (VET, UTC−04:00)
- Executed by: See list: United States Armed Forces; United States Army; 160th Special Operations Aviation Regiment; Delta Force; United States Navy; United States Marine Corps; United States Coast Guard; United States Air Force; United States Cyber Command; United States Space Command; Central Intelligence Agency; United States Department of Justice; Drug Enforcement Administration; Federal Bureau of Investigation; Hostage Rescue Team
- Outcome: American victory See list: Nicolás Maduro and Cilia Flores captured by the US military and prosecuted; Vice president Delcy Rodríguez sworn in as acting president of Venezuela; Amnesty bill and 621 political prisoners detained in Venezuela released (as of 8 March); 2026 Cuban crisis; Lift of US sanctions on oil trade and privatization of Venezuela oil industry; Trump administration established control over the finance and foreign policies of the Rodríguez regime
- Casualties: Killed: 23 or 47 Venezuelan military personnel (Note: 23 soldiers killed as published in list by the military while other sources report 24. Independent Venezuelan sources indicate 42 or 43. Vladimir Padrino López said 47 without a list. See § Casualties for more reports.); 32 Cuban military and security personnel; 2 civilians, including Colombian street vendor Yohana Rodríguez Sierra; Injured: 7 US soldiers

On 3 January 2026, the United States launched a military strike in Venezuela and captured incumbent Venezuelan president Nicolás Maduro and his wife, Cilia Flores. The US operation, codenamed Operation Absolute Resolve, began around 2 a.m. local time, when explosions were observed. The US Armed Forces bombed infrastructure across northern Venezuela to suppress air defenses as an apprehension force attacked Maduro's compound in Caracas. Approximately 80 people, including Venezuelan and Cuban military and civilians, died and seven American soldiers were wounded. Maduro and Flores were transported to New York City by US forces and were indicted on drug trafficking charges to which Maduro and Flores pleaded not guilty.

US president Donald Trump and his administration justified the operation as a law-enforcement action with military support, saying that the president has "inherent constitutional authority" to undertake such an act. Venezuelan vice president Delcy Rodríguez denounced Maduro's "kidnapping". Venezuelan officials said at least 23 Venezuelan security officers were killed during the attack. The Cuban government said that 32 members of the Cuban military and intelligence agencies were killed. Officials in the United Nations (UN), the US, and other countries, (Note: Brazil, China, Colombia, Cuba, Eritrea, Mexico, Russia, South Africa, and Spain) as well as international law experts said the raid violated the UN Charter and Venezuela's sovereignty. Other reactions around the world included celebrations by the Venezuelan diaspora and protests against the attack.

The Venezuelan government remained in place, with Rodríguez sworn in as acting president on 5 January 2026. Multiple political prisoners (including foreigners) detained in Venezuela were released, a gesture which, according to Trump, contributed to avoiding a second wave of attacks. On 30 January, Rodríguez announced an amnesty bill for political prisoners covering the period of 1999 to present, which was approved on 19 February. As of 8 March, the number of political prisoners released confirmed since 8 January was 621 out of an estimate of over 800 held before January, according to human rights organizations. By February, the US and Venezuela had restarted diplomatic relations, with the Embassy of the United States, Caracas, being reopened for the first time since 2019. Since the intervention, the US State Department under Marco Rubio has exercised control over core aspects of Venezuela's governance, including its domestic finances, government appointments, revenues, foreign policy, and the distribution of its natural resources.

Trump and his administration made clear that access to Venezuelan oil was a core reason for the action. (Note: Attributed to multiple sources:) The US announced a 50-million-barrel oil supply deal with the remaining government in Venezuela, with the first $300 million already received on 20 January. On 29 January, a new law was passed by Rodríguez to give private companies control over the production and sale of oil. In parallel, the US lifted sanctions imposed on Venezuelan oil trade and issued licenses for companies to trade Venezuelan oil. Since the attack, the Trump administration has collected more than $13 billion in proceeds from Venezuelan oil sales, without financial oversight. It has used the disbursement of oil revenue as leverage against Rodríguez's government.

== Background ==
=== Political, economic and international ===
Nicolás Maduro has been criticized for authoritarian rule since Hugo Chávez hand-picked him as the next president of Venezuela in 2013. According to Reuters, "Maduro ruled Venezuela with a heavy hand ... presiding over deep economic and social crises and resisting pressure from domestic opponents and foreign governments for political change", and was "long accused by critics both at home and abroad of being a dictator who jailed or persecuted political opponents and repeatedly staged sham elections". The US government pressured Maduro, and considered him an "illegitimate leader", as did the UK, Canada, the European Union, and others.

Maduro's victory in the 2018 Venezuelan presidential election was widely disputed, causing a presidential crisis from 2019 to 2023. Without presenting vote tallies, the government-controlled National Electoral Council declared Maduro the winner of the 2024 Venezuelan presidential election; the result was "widely condemned as fraudulent by international observers and the opposition" who found statistical improbabilities in the results. The opposition showed evidence and vote tallies that its candidate, Edmundo González, had won a majority, matching the results of pre-election opinion polls; he was "widely believed to have won [the] election, and by a landslide", according to The New York Times. The Venezuelan government issued an arrest warrant for González, who left the country and was granted asylum in Spain. In January 2025, the Biden administration recognized González as Venezuela's legitimate president-elect. The Trump administration had sought to prosecute Maduro on narco-terrorism charges since at least 2020. At a 2023 press conference, Trump said, "Venezuela was about to collapse. We would have taken over it... [and] kept all that oil."

=== Oil and mineral resources ===
Venezuela has the largest proven crude oil reserves of any country in the world.

Venezuela holds the world's largest proven oil reserves, estimated at 17% of the global total, or 300 billion barrels. In December 2025, the US began a maritime blockade of sanctioned oil or shadow fleet tankers.

The 2025–2026 operations are seen by the Trump administration as serving the triple goals of crippling Maduro, disrupting drug trade routes, and getting access to Venezuelan oil; Trump stated that revenue generated would go to the Venezuelan people, US oil companies, and "to the United States of America in the form of reimbursement for the damages caused us by that country". Following the raid, Trump's press conference made clear that oil was a motivation for action in Venezuela. Citing the restructuring of Venezuela's oil industry in 1976 and 2007, Trump, Stephen Miller, and others claimed that Venezuela had stolen oil from US companies. Trump suggested on 5 January that seized oil could be treated as a US asset, asserting the willingness to sell it or add it to the US Strategic Petroleum Reserve. On 9 January, after other sanctioned vessels were seized, and a tanker was returned to Venezuela as part of a joint operation between interim authorities in Venezuela and the US, Trump said: "This tanker is now on its way back to Venezuela, and the oil will be sold through the GREAT Energy Deal, which we have created for such sales."

The Trump administration also expressed interest in Venezuela's large deposits of gold and rare earth minerals. Some experts noted that the Maduro government had previously attempted to offer the US access to these minerals in a failed attempt to stave off military action, with the ongoing operations marking a return to "resource imperialism".

Trump stated on the day of the military operation that US oil companies would invest billions to increase oil production in the country; ExxonMobil, ConocoPhillips, and Chevron Corporation (the US oil majors) reportedly had no prior knowledge of the operation to remove Maduro and unnamed sources said they had no discussions with the Trump administration before the operation about investing in the country if Maduro was removed. Trump further stated that US oil companies would invest $100 billion in Venezuelan oil production; in a meeting between Trump and two dozen oil company executives on 9 January, ExxonMobil CEO Darren Woods stated that Venezuela was "uninvestable" due to the legal framework in the country while the majority of the executives in attendance did not make firm investment commitments. ExxonMobil and ConocoPhillips left Venezuela after their assets were expropriated in 2007, while Chevron continued its operations. Two days after the meeting, Trump told reporters that he was "inclined" to keep ExxonMobil out of Venezuela because he "didn't like Exxon's response" to his proposed investments for the country and thought that "They're playing too cute."

Unlike Congress, Trump claimed to have spoken with oil companies both "before and after".

=== Indictment of Maduro ===
US attorney general Pam Bondi's August 2025 announcement that the reward for Maduro's arrest has increased to $50 million

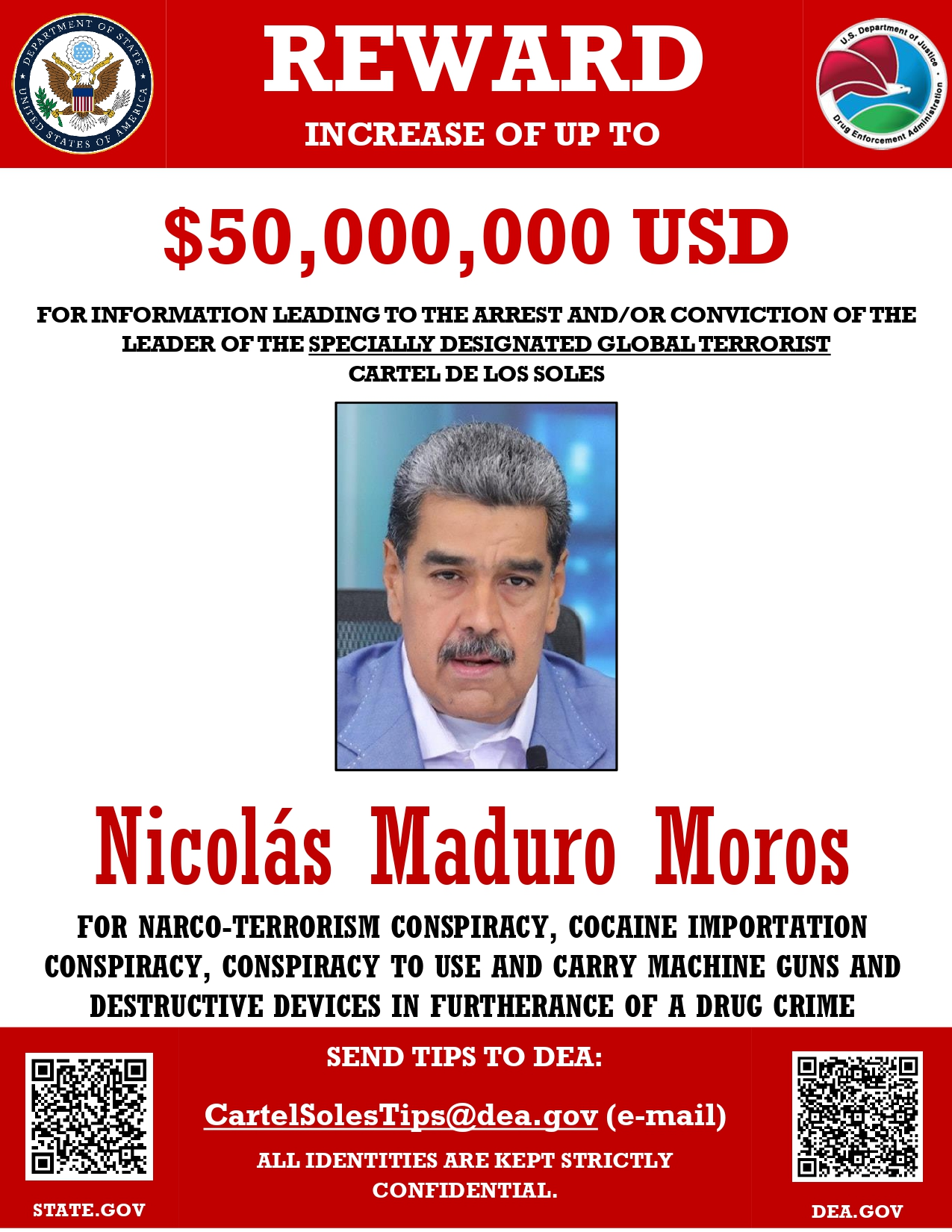
Updated reward poster of Maduro, issued just hours after Attorney General Bondi's announcement

The United States accused Maduro of electoral fraud and presiding over a "narco-state". In March 2020, during Trump's first term, the United States Justice Department indicted Maduro on cocaine-trafficking conspiracy charges, which Maduro denied. Trump designated two Venezuelan drug gangs, the Tren de Aragua and the Cartel of the Suns, as Foreign Terrorist Organizations (FTOs) in January and July 2025 respectively, and alleged that the latter was led by Maduro. Maduro denied being involved in cartel leadership and characterized the designations as an attempt to use the war on drugs for regime change. Some Latin American crime experts have described the Cartel of the Suns as more of a general network of Venezuelan government and military corruption than as an organized group. Also in July 2025, a secret order instructed the US military to use force against cartels listed as terrorist organizations. In August 2025, the reward for Maduro's arrest increased to $50 million with US attorney general Pam Bondi calling Maduro "one of the largest narco-traffickers in the world and a threat to our national security."

However, the Associated Press reported in January 2026 that while the US government has never publicly accused Delcy Rodríguez of criminal wrongdoing related to the drug trade, the Drug Enforcement Administration has nonetheless gathered an extensive intelligence file on Rodríguez since 2018 and designated her as a "priority target" in 2022—which the agency does for individuals suspected of having "significant impact" on the drug trade. In testimony before the US Senate Foreign Relations Committee on 28 January, US Secretary of State Marco Rubio did not confirm the story when asked by Senator Jeanne Shaheen and instead only noted that Rodríguez had not been indicted, saying: "We are dealing with individuals that in our system would not be acceptable in the long term. But we are in a transition to stabilization phase. You have to work with the people currently in charge of the elements of government."

=== United States military buildup ===
In August 2025, the United States began a military buildup in the southern Caribbean, deploying warships and military personnel. The Central Intelligence Agency (CIA) sent a team into Venezuela that began tracking Maduro's movements, using a source close to the Venezuelan president, and plans were made for the capture of Maduro months in advance. The Delta Force and other participants in the operation erected a mockup of the safe house in which Maduro was believed to be hiding, described by Trump as a "very highly guarded ... fortress". In September, the United States Southern Command began conducting military strikes on vessels in the Caribbean Sea, alleging some were trafficking drugs on behalf of Venezuela.

In November 2025, Venezuelan opposition leader María Corina Machado promised to open Venezuela's oil and gas reserves during a business meeting in Miami attended by Trump, and the Trump administration engaged in secret talks with Maduro's government about its oil reserves. In December 2025, this escalated to include seizures of sanctioned oil tankers carrying Venezuelan crude. These seizures formed part of the broader blockade on sanctioned oil preceding the January 2026 operation. The US also launched covert operations in Venezuela under the directive of the CIA in late December. On 2 January 2026, Trump announced that the US military would conduct strikes inside Venezuela.

In the weeks preceding the operation, Trinidad and Tobago signed an agreement with the US to allow US military access to its airports. General Dan Caine, Chairman of the Joint Chiefs of Staff, said in a 3 January press conference that the US military had spent months planning and rehearsing the operation, with forces positioned and ready by early December. In late December, the US escalated its military efforts against Venezuela onto land, including striking a remote northern port reportedly used by Tren de Aragua for smuggling. At that time, Maduro rejected an offer from the US to go into exile in Turkey. According to The New York Times, Maduro's public displays downplaying the seriousness of the American threats in the weeks before the operation, such as through public dancing on a stage to electronic music sampling one of his speeches in which Maduro said "No crazy war", were a factor in Trump deciding to begin the operation.

President Trump stated that the operation had been ready to launch several days earlier but was postponed due to poor weather and cloud cover, which made flying into Caracas hazardous. General Caine, added that US forces waited for conditions to improve to minimize the risk to civilian populations and explained that the mission proceeded only after the weather "broke just enough" to allow aircraft to maneuver safely into position.

=== Discussions with other members of Maduro's government ===
According to anonymous sources, Reuters reported that United States officials established conversations with Venezuelan minister of interior Diosdado Cabello months before, in order to avoid using the security services or militant ruling-party supporters to target the Venezuelan opposition in case of an attack.

According to the Miami Herald, a circle of Venezuelan officials centered on Delcy Rodríguez and her brother, Jorge, privately outlined a roadmap for post-Maduro Venezuela, in which Delcy would act as figurehead and exiled general Miguel Rodríguez Torres (no relationship to the Rodriguez siblings) would lead a "transitional government", dubbed "Madurismo without Maduro"; in return, Venezuela would welcome US investors and gradually loosen ties to US rivals such as Iran and Russia. The Venezuelan proposals were made to US envoy Richard Grenell through Qatari channels; the Trump administration reportedly rejected the overtures. According to the Financial Times, Delcy Rodríguez's brother Jorge Rodríguez had held talks with the United States government in 2025 to have his sister lead a post-Maduro transitional government, though those talks had included Maduro being allowed to go into exile instead of being captured. Anonymous sources speaking for The Guardian said that Delcy and Jorge Rodríguez were communicating with the American and Qatar officials. According to American officials she told them in December that "'Maduro needs to go" and stating "I'll work with whatever is the aftermath.'"

== Strikes ==
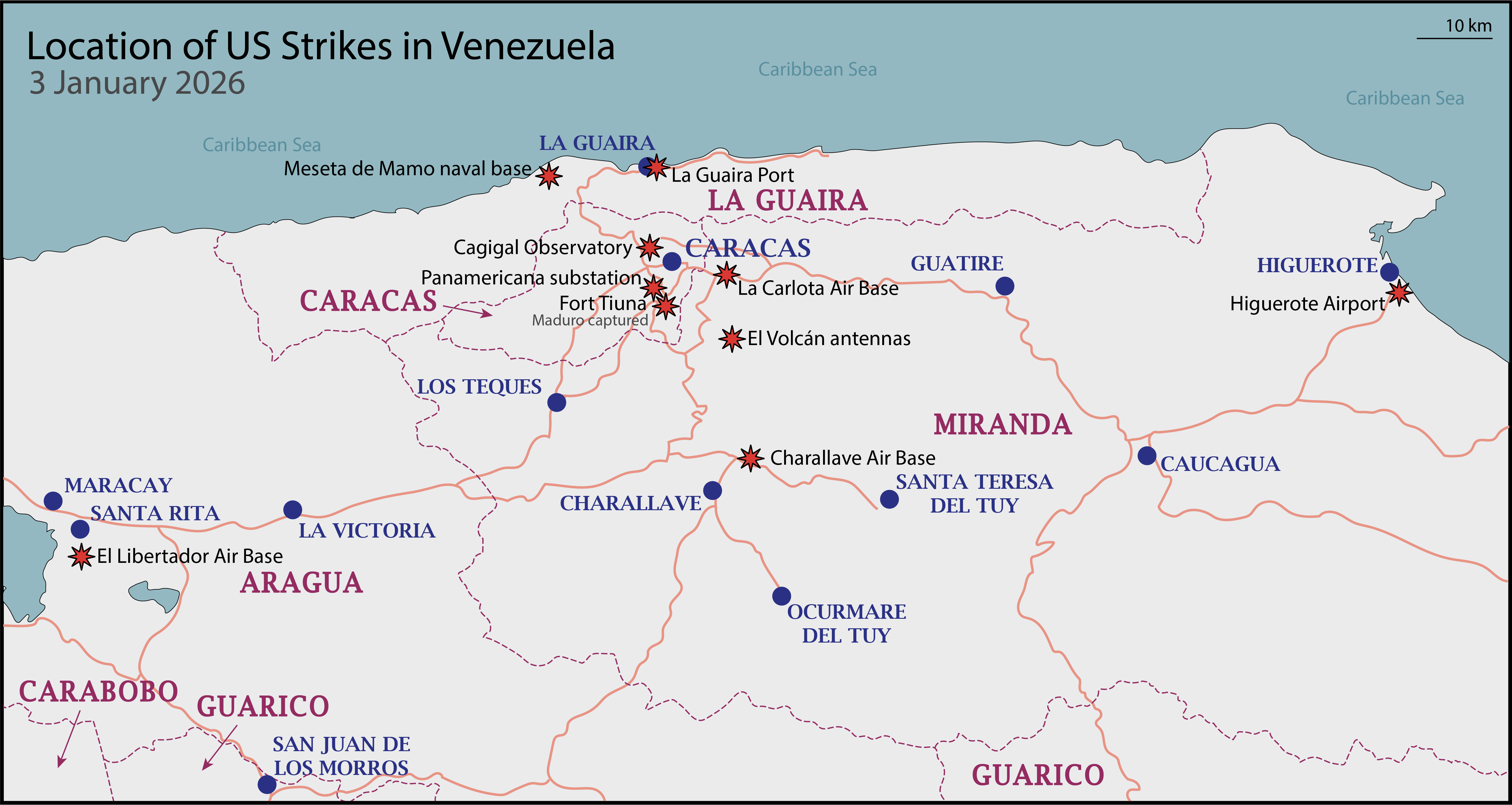
Map of the US strikes on Venezuela

According to US Joint Chiefs of Staff Chairman General Dan Caine, Trump gave the order to proceed at 23:46 VET (22:46 EST) on 2 January. The administration did not notify the United States Congress in advance of the strikes, saying they had concerns that this could endanger the mission. According to Semafor, The New York Times and The Washington Post knew about the strikes before they were carried out. At least seven explosions were reported at around 02:00 VET (01:00 EST) on 3 January, and low-flying aircraft were seen, predominantly in La Guaira, Higuerote, Meseta de Mamo, Baruta, El Hatillo, Charallave, and Carmen de Uria, most of which are in or near the capital city Caracas.

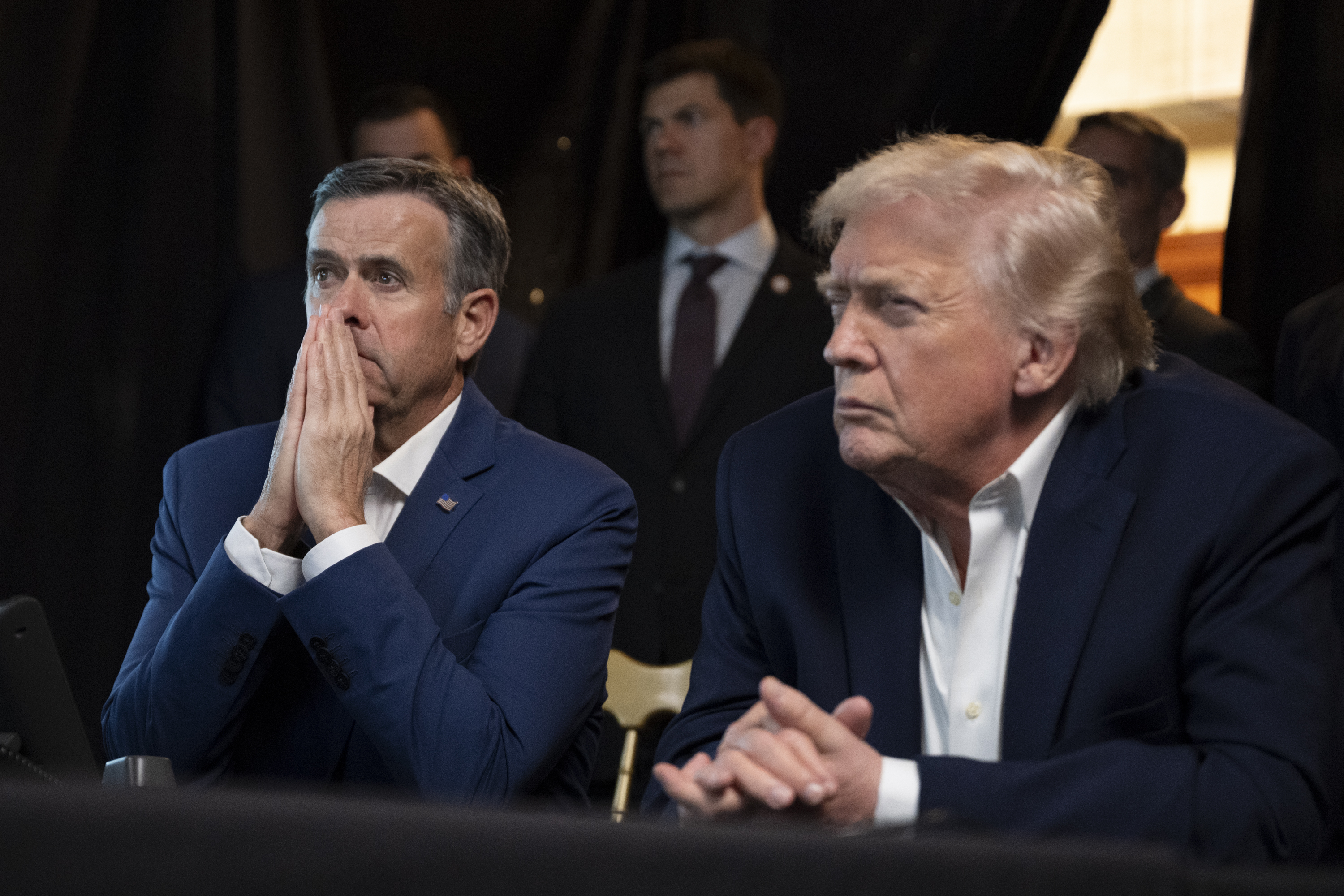
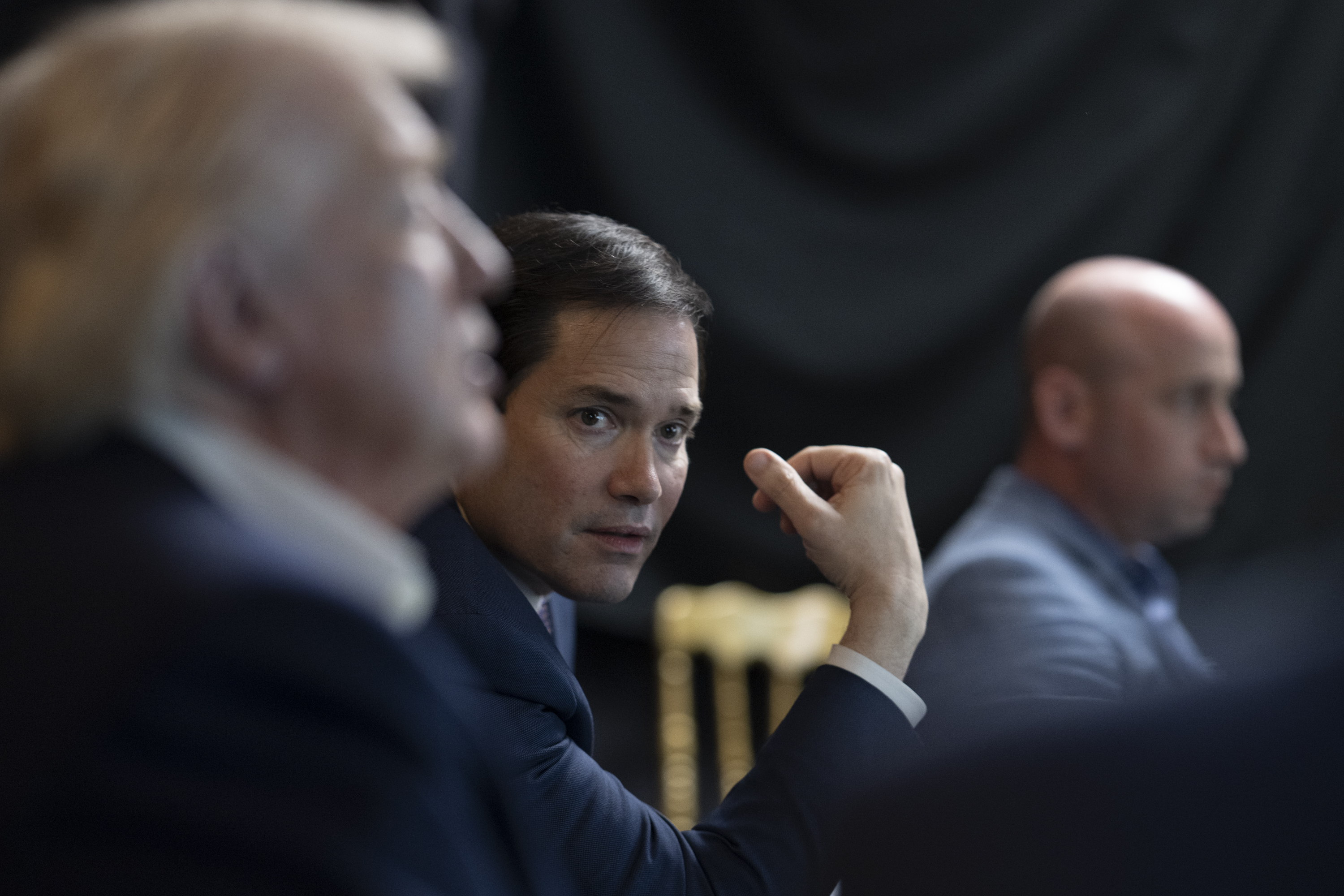
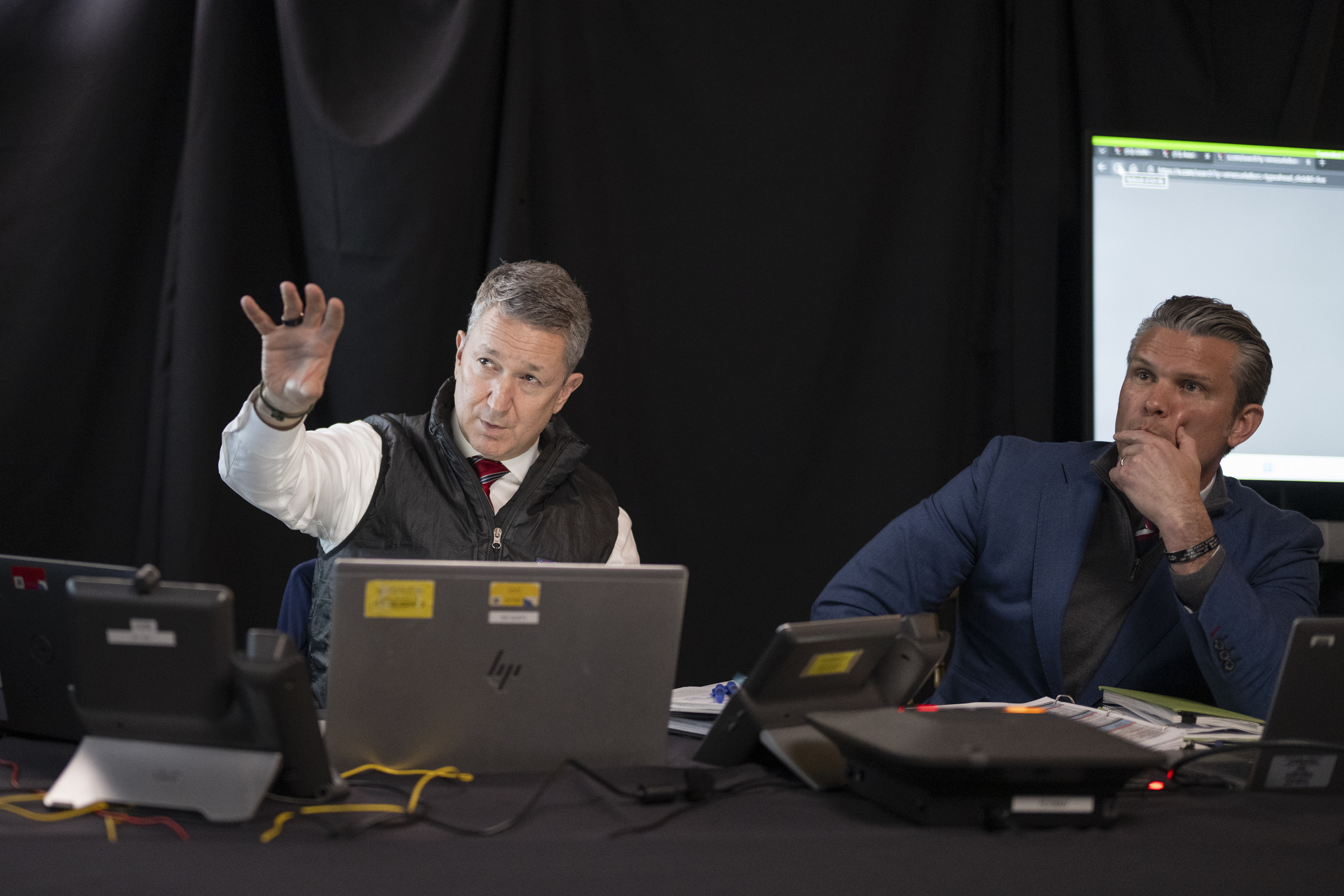
Clockwise from top:
- President Donald Trump (right) during Operation Absolute Resolve, alongside CIA Director John Ratcliffe (left)
- Joint Chiefs of Staff Chairman Gen Dan Caine (left), alongside Secretary of Defense Pete Hegseth (right)
- Trump (left), alongside Secretary of State Marco Rubio (center) and Deputy Chief of Staff Stephen Miller (right)

The operation involved 150 aircraft from the United States Navy, Air Force, and Marine Corps. They included airplanes (Lockheed Martin F-22A Raptor, Lockheed Martin F-35A/C Lightning II, Boeing F/A-18E/F Super Hornet, Boeing EA-18G Growler, Grumman E-2D Hawkeye, Rockwell B-1B Lancer) and helicopters (Boeing MH-47G Chinooks and MH-60M DAP), refueling tankers, electronic-warfare (EW) planes, other support aircraft, and numerous unmanned aerial vehicles (including the Lockheed Martin RQ-170 Sentinel). Trump said the United States "had a fighter jet for every possible situation".

Following the operation, White House press secretary Karoline Leavitt shared an eyewitness account of Venezuelan military personnel suffering injuries consistent with sonic weaponry during the American strike. Trump later told Katie Pavlich that "we have weapons nobody else knows about [...] we have some amazing weapons. That was an amazing attack." In a separate interview with the New York Post, he referred to one of these as a secret weapon called a "discombobulator," saying it caused Venezuelan defense systems, including Russian and Chinese rockets, to "not work," and that forces "pressed buttons and nothing worked." While Trump suggested the device disrupted equipment, CNN noted that reports of personnel injuries may have involved other technologies, such as acoustic or non-lethal systems such as the Active Denial System, rather than the classified weapon he described.

The operation reportedly used one-way attack drones, which is believed to be the first such operational usage by the US military. Most of the explosions targeted antennas and active military bases. Early reports suggested that the explosions were at Generalissimo Francisco de Miranda Air Base (La Carlota) and Fort Tiuna, two military installations in Caracas. Large explosions were also reported at Higuerote Airport, on the Venezuelan coast. Helicopters from the 160th Special Operations Aviation Regiment carried Delta Force soldiers into Caracas with air cover provided by the fighters and bombers. One helicopter was damaged by Venezuelan ground defenses but continued on its mission. Federal Bureau of Investigation (FBI) personnel, including the Hostage Rescue Team, accompanied the military to formally arrest Maduro at his compound.

The strikes lasted half an hour. Smoke was seen rising from one military hangar in a Caracas base, while another was left unpowered. The strikes happened under the cover of darkness as a result of both the timing of the operation and the US military's disruption of power in the city of Caracas. Multiple shipping containers were destroyed and damaged in the La Guaira port strikes. Satellite imagery from Vantor showed at least five destroyed warehouses, burned vehicles, and a blown-up security post. An aircraft, believed to be a Beechcraft Baron, and a Buk-M2E surface-to-air missile system were destroyed at Higuerote Airport. The Venezuelan Science and Technology Minister Gabriela Jiménez Ramírez shared footage on social media of crumbled buildings of the Venezuelan Institute for Scientific Research (IVIC) in La Guaira which she attributed to strikes of AGM-154 glide bombs by the United States. The Venezuelan government said that Maduro declared a national state of emergency after the explosions began. The Venezuelan government promised to defend against US military actions which it accused of seeking regime change. It described them as "imperialist aggression" and called for the United Nations Security Council (UNSC) to be convened.

== Capture of Maduro ==
Message aired in Venezuelan television channels during the operation leading to Nicolas Maduro being captured.

At 05:21 Venezuelan Standard Time (VET) or 04:21 Eastern Standard Time (ET), Trump announced that Maduro and Flores had been captured and flown out of the country. (Note: Attributed to multiple sources:) The capture was undertaken by the US Army's Delta Force, with on-the-ground intelligence provided by the CIA. Trump posted a photograph on his Truth Social account of Maduro on board USS Iwo Jima, showing him blindfolded, with soundproof headphones and a gray Nike sweatsuit, holding a plastic water bottle. According to US Secretary of State Marco Rubio, Maduro was "arrested" and would face criminal charges in the US.

Nahum Fernández, leader of the ruling United Socialist Party of Venezuela, said Maduro and Flores were captured at Fort Tiuna; they reportedly slept at multiple locations and had a "fortress-like" compound at Fort Tiuna. Delcy Rodríguez confirmed that both Maduro and Flores were missing and demanded confirmation they were alive via an audio message on state television. According to Reuters sources, Rodríguez was in Russia on 3 January 2026. While other rumors indicate she was vacationing in Margarita Island. Other reports indicated that Rodríguez was in Caracas.

Shortly before 18:00 VET (17:00 EST), the airplane carrying Maduro and Flores landed at Stewart Air National Guard Base in New York. He was seen walking off the jet, surrounded by federal agents, before entering a hangar. He was then flown by helicopter to the Westside Heliport in Manhattan, New York City and then taken by an armored convoy to a local Drug Enforcement Administration (DEA) field office where he was processed before ultimately being held in the Metropolitan Detention Center Brooklyn.

=== Legal proceedings ===
Hours after the capture, the United States attorney general Pam Bondi announced that Maduro and Flores had been indicted in the Southern District of New York on charges related to "narcoterrorism". The indictment listed the charges as narco-terrorism conspiracy, cocaine importation conspiracy, possession of machine guns and destructive devices, and conspiracy to possess machine guns and destructive devices. The amended indictment did not refer to the Cartel of the Suns as an organized group as previously alleged by the US, but instead as a corrupt patronage system, which aligns with experts' descriptions of its operations.

Maduro and his wife were arraigned in a Manhattan federal court on 5 January 2026. Before pleading, Maduro said: "I am the president of Venezuela, I consider myself a prisoner of war. I was captured at my home in Caracas." Both pleaded not guilty to numerous drug trafficking charges. US District Judge Alvin Hellerstein ordered that Maduro be held at least until a hearing. Originally scheduled for 17 March, the hearing was delayed to 26 March. Maduro and Flores appeared in court for it, then were transferred back to jail in Brooklyn. Maduro is reportedly spending most of his time in prison reading the Bible. He does not have access to newspapers or the internet in prison, but he is allowed to speak by telephone with his family and lawyers for approximately 300 minutes a month, with a maximum of 15 minutes per call.

Their trial was scheduled for 1 June 2027.

== Casualties ==
First responders in La Guaira after the attack

Venezuelan defense minister Vladimir Padrino López said that US combat helicopters fired rockets and missiles in urban areas and that officials were working to gather information on the number of fatalities and injuries. Padrino López also stated that most of Maduro's personal guard were killed during the attack. The New York Times reported on 3 January 2026 that an anonymous Venezuelan official said at least 40 people, including civilians and military personnel, were killed in the attack, updated to 80 on 4 January, "according to a senior Venezuelan official". Independent Venezuelan journalistic reports confirmed that most Venezuelan dead were among members of the presidential guard, with two civilian deaths.

The presence of Cuban troops in Venezuela was made public after the attack. Their presence was denied as far back as 2008. In 2019 Maduro had claimed in an interview that no Cuban military personnel were stationed in the country and that his personal guard was Venezuelan. Trump indicated that Cuban forces were involved in the operation, stating: "You know, a lot of Cubans were killed yesterday." The government of Cuba reported that 32 Cubans were killed in Venezuela, all members of armed forces and intelligence services. One of the most senior Cuban soldiers that died, Colonel Humberto Roca, was responsible for Fidel Castro's security in the past. According to Reuters reporting in February, anonymous Venezuelan officials indicated that some Cuban security forces and medical doctors in Venezuela were returning to Cuba, diminishing their role in Venezuelan politics. According to some officials, Cubans were being removed from their posts in Venezuela's General Directorate of Military Counterintelligence (DGCIM).

On 6 January 55 military deaths were confirmed: the victims were 32 Cubans and 23 Venezuelans. Both the countries released on the same day the identities of the killed soldiers. Also on 6 January, military forces posted a video on social media in honor of 24 soldiers killed during the attack. Attorney General Tarek William Saab indicated that dozens of military personnel and civilians were killed and the total number is still under investigation. A day later, Diosdado Cabello said that 100 persons died during the bombing. Independent monitors reported as of 7 January Venezuelan military casualties as of 6 January of 42 or 43 soldiers (mostly at Fort Tiuna), in addition to the 32 Cuban military personnel, and 2 civilians. On 16 January, Venezuelan defense minister Vladimir Padrino López, said that 47 soldiers, including 9 women, were killed during the attack. Acting president Delcy Rodríguez declared seven days of mourning for the soldiers killed during the attack. The remains of the Cuban fatalities were repatriated on 15 January. They received a mass funeral ceremony in Havana upon arrival.

In Catia La Mar, strikes hit a three-story civilian apartment complex, killing one person, seriously injuring another, and destroying the exterior wall. Yohana Rodríguez Sierra, a Colombian citizen, was reported as a civilian fatality in El Hatillo. The US had been bombing nearby telecommunications antennas, according to the victim's relative.

According to the Department of Defense, seven US soldiers were injured and expected to survive. The soldiers suffered shrapnel and gunfire wounds. During the 2026 State of the Union Address, Trump awarded the Medal of Honor to Chief Warrant Officer Eric Slover, one of the helicopter pilots that got injured during the operation. Slover was the lead Chinook pilot for the air assault element of the operation. His helicopter came under fire as the flight approached Maduro's compound, and he was hit in the leg and hip by four bullets. His aircraft was also hit but remained flyable. Despite his wounds, Slover maintained control of the aircraft and got the Delta Team onboard over the compound and allowed them to fast rope to the ground. He then flew back to the USS Iwo Jima located in the Caribbean Sea.

== Further developments ==
=== Immediate aftermath ===
President Trump addresses the nation on the airstrikes against Venezuela on 3 January 2026.

The government formerly led by Maduro remained in place. Vice President Delcy Rodríguez described Maduro as Venezuela's "only president" and called for calm and unity to defend the country amid what she called his "kidnapping". She stated that Venezuela would "never again be a colony of any empire". On 3 January 2026, the Supreme Tribunal of Justice ordered Rodríguez to assume the interim presidency due to Maduro's absence. The Venezuelan military announced it would recognize Rodríguez as acting president and called for a return to normalcy. Rodríguez was sworn in as acting president of Venezuela on 5 January 2026 by her brother and president of the National Assembly of Venezuela, Jorge Rodríguez.

But we can't take a chance after having done this incredible thing last night of letting somebody else take over where we have to do it again. We can do it again too. Nobody can stop us.

— Donald Trump on Fox & Friends on 3 January 2026, via YouTube Archive.org

The US Federal Aviation Administration issued a notice to airmen on 3 January 2026 prohibiting US aircraft from operating within Venezuelan airspace, citing "ongoing military activity". The US Embassy in Caracas issued a shelter-in-place order from its relocated operations in Colombia. The southern area of Caracas reportedly lost power. Republican Senator Mike Lee (Note: Lee initially voiced skepticism on X after the announcement, which prompted Rubio's outreach.) said that Secretary of State Marco Rubio "anticipates no further action in Venezuela now that Maduro is in US custody," and that Maduro was expected to go on trial in the US.

In the hours after the US attack, Rubio placed a call with Delcy and Jorge Rodríguez, as well as Mauricio Claver-Carone, who was involved in the plan to abduct Maduro and would go on to serve as an unofficial viceroy for the Trump administration in Venezuela.

In a television interview with ABC News, Rubio thanked news organizations who had received leaks about the operation before it took place for not reporting on it. According to Semafor, The New York Times and The Washington Post had received information about the attack but did not report on it in order to not endanger the lives of US personnel involved in the operation. The acknowledgment of the media withholding information about the operation came after defense secretary Pete Hegseth imposed strict restrictions on Pentagon reporters due to a mistrust of journalists' abilities to withhold militarily sensitive information from the public.

External videos
- Maduro perp walk at New York City Drug Enforcement Administration headquarters
- X / @PaulDMauro

On 5 January 2026, the Venezuelan government issued an emergency order to police to arrest anyone who supported the US attack and mobilized colectivos (pro-government paramilitaries) who established roadblocks and searched cars and people. Fourteen journalists were detained, but 13 of them were later released. On 6 January, gunfire broke out in Caracas as the ministry of communication announced that police fired upon one of their own military drones "flying without permission" but that the drone suffered no damage.

==== United States plan announcement ====
On 3 January 2026, Trump stated: "We are going to run the country until such time as we can do a safe, proper and judicious transition". He indicated that the US might send troops to Venezuela as part of this. Trump also said that Rubio had made contact with Rodríguez and that she allegedly told Rubio, "We'll do whatever you need", and that she was gracious but "really doesn't have a choice"; Trump further opined that Rodríguez was "essentially willing to do what we think is necessary" to revive Venezuela, marking a shift in the administration's stance compared to months prior, when the US excluded any settlement with Rodríguez. Media outlets noted Rodríguez's statements contradicted Trump's.

"Venezuela unilaterally seized and stole American oil, American assets and American platforms, costing us billions and billions of dollars. They did this a while ago, but we never had a president that did anything about it. They took all of our property—it was our property. We built it. And we never had a president that decided to do anything about it. Instead, they fought wars that were 10,000 miles away. We built Venezuela oil industry with American talent, drive and skill. And the socialist regime stole it from us during those previous administrations, and they stole it through force. This constituted one of the largest thefts of American property in the history of our country."

— President Trump, CNN transcripts

Trump characterized the action as an application of the Monroe Doctrine, which he styled as the "Donroe Doctrine", and added that "American dominance in the western hemisphere will never be questioned again." Trump further stated that US oil companies would "go in, spend billions of dollars, fix the badly broken infrastructure, the oil infrastructure, and start making money for the country", and that the US was prepared to launch a second, much larger attack. He also expressed openness to a US occupation of Venezuela, stating it would not cost the US anything because it would be reimbursed through revenue from Venezuela's oil reserves. On 7 January, Trump stated that US efforts to revitalize Venezuela could take "much longer" than a year, adding that the Venezuelan authorities were doing "everything that we feel is necessary". Regarding the reward the US government offered for information leading to Maduro's capture, Rubio added that nobody will be receiving it. Rubio said "I guess we save $50 million" to which Trump replied "Don't let anybody claim it. Nobody deserves it but us."

On 4 January 2026, Marco Rubio retracted Trump's comments of the day before, saying the US would not govern Venezuela, but would continue to enforce the existing oil quarantine in order to pressure Venezuela for policy changes. Rubio also affirmed that the US did not officially recognize Rodríguez's presidency, despite Trump's avowal that he would work with Rodríguez. According to The New York Times, Vice President Rodríguez's economic record of increasing her country's oil production and stabilizing its economy despite harsher US sanctions in recent years and her reputation among Venezuelan and foreign business leaders as a technocrat, had earned the respect of American officials. For her part, Rodríguez conveyed an offer to collaborate with US officials "within the framework of international law". Of Rodríguez, Trump said that "she's cooperating", threatened her if she did not, and maintained that he would demand "total access" by US oil interests.

On 7 January, Marco Rubio stated that the US government has a three-stage plan for Venezuela: stability, recovery, then transition. According to Rubio, the first phase is about the stabilization of the country after the strikes and stopping it from "descending into chaos," including refining and selling up to 50 million barrels of seized Venezuelan crude oil, adding that "that money will then be handled in such a way that we will control how it is disbursed in a way that benefits the Venezuelan people, not corruption, not the regime, so we have a lot of leverage to move on the stabilization front." During the second phase of recovery, the goal is to assure foreign companies have access to Venezuelan oil trade and "also, at the same time, begin to create the process of reconciliation nationally within Venezuela, so that the opposition forces can be amnestied and released from prisons or brought back to the country, and begin to rebuild civil society." Rubio added that the final and third phase consist on overseeing a transition, "this will be a process of transition. In the end, it will be up to the Venezuelan people to transform their country."

Trump stated there was an agreement by Venezuela to deliver a few months' worth of oil to the US, intimating that other steps, such as the freeing of political detainees and a role for the exiled opposition, might be next. However, President Rodríguez denied the existence of a deal, saying "no external agent" was dictating her decisions.

On 8 January, the US Senate voted 52 to 47 to advance a war resolution that aimed to block the president's use of the US military to engage in military action within or against Venezuela unless authorized by Congress. The measure passed with the support of five Republican senators, but did not reach a veto-proof majority.

==== De facto status as puppet state ====
In the months following the intervention, the United States has effectively run Venezuela as a de facto puppet state. Its domestic finances, government appointments, revenues, and oil reserves are overseen by the United States Secretary of State. The Executive Office of the President of the United States has controlled the public appearances and statements by the country's leader, including de facto control over its foreign policy. The Times described Rodríguez as having effectively been "strong armed" by Trump "with the threat of full-scale military invasion if she does not co-operate."

=== Renewal of diplomatic relations ===
After the announcement of the release of political prisoners by the Venezuelan government on 8 January, the US and Venezuela began discussions to restart diplomatic relations, including the possibility of reopening the United States embassy in Caracas which was closed in 2019. US officials visited Caracas and on 10 January, the US State Department published a security alert urging its citizens to leave Venezuela immediately due to the presence of colectivos (pro-government paramilitary groups) targeting US citizens.

Donald Trump announced on 14 January that he had talked by phone with acting president of Venezuela Delcy Rodríguez on oil, trade and national security. The call was confirmed by Rodríguez, who qualified the phone call as positive. Rodríguez also announced to have sent envoys to meet with United States officials the next day.

On 15 January, Central Intelligence Agency (CIA) director John Ratcliffe met with Delcy Rodríguez in Caracas to discuss cooperation and economic stability. According to a US official "The director made clear Venezuela can no longer provide support to drug traffickers like TDA" (referring to the criminal organization Tren de Aragua).

After a discussion with Delcy Rodríguez on 29 January, Trump announced the re-opening of Venezuelan airspace.

US diplomat Laura Farnsworth Dogu was appointed chargé d'affaires for Venezuela on 22 January, and arrived to Venezuela on 30 January. On 2 February, she met in Miraflores Palace with Delcy and Jorge Rodríguez to establish "the work agenda between the Bolivarian Republic of Venezuela and the United States." After the meeting, the US embassy shared on social media that Dogu met with the Venezuelan administration to "reiterate the three phases that US Secretary of State Marco Rubio had outlined for Venezuela: stabilization, economic recovery and reconciliation, and transition." Felix Plasencia was named as diplomatic representative of Venezuela to the United States.

United States Energy Secretary Chris Wright arrived to Caracas on 11 February to make an assessment on Venezuela's oil industry. He met with Delcy Rodríguez in the presidential palace. Days before, Wright said he was expecting to "visit some of the nation's oil fields to see firsthand how President Trump's historic US-Venezuela Energy Deal is unleashing peace and prosperity." According to the Venezuelan information minister, they discussed a bilateral energy agenda. The last US Energy Secretary that visited Venezuela before that was Bill Richardson in 2001 under US president Bill Clinton.

Dogu and Plasencia received a US shipment of six metric tons of medicine and medical supplies that arrived in Venezuela on 13 February. Dogu indicated it was "the first of many donations" that will arrive "in the coming days". Plasencia said that it was a "message of cooperation among two sovereign countries."

When asked by reporters on 13 February, Trump said that he was "going to make a visit to Venezuela" but did not provide more details. On 19 February, the chief of the United States Southern Command, General Francis L. Donovan, and senior Pentagon official Joseph Humire met with Delcy Rodríguez, Venezuelan defense minister Vladimir Padrino López and interior minister Diosdado Cabello in Caracas to discuss security.

US Interior Secretary Doug Burgum visited Venezuela and met with Delcy Rodríguez on 4 March. They discussed the supply chains for critical minerals in Venezuela. On 5 March, the US State Department and Venezuelan authorities agreed to re-establish diplomatic and consular relations.

On 12 March, the United States declared in court that they recognized Delcy Rodríguez as the sole head of state of Venezuela. Two days later, the flag of the United States was raised for the first time in seven years at the Embassy of the United States, Caracas. On 30 March, the United States reopened its embassy in Venezuela, meaning resumption of US diplomatic operations in Venezuela.

On 30 April, direct commercial flights between the United States and Venezuela were resumed after a seven-year suspension.

On 22 September, President Donald Trump met with Venezuela's interim President Delcy Rodriguez in the opening of the 81st session of the UN General Assembly in New York.

=== Role of Venezuelan opposition ===
Influenced by a CIA analysis, Trump stated after the strikes that María Corina Machado, the leader of the opposition, did not have the necessary support or respect in the country to govern. The relationships between Machado and the Trump administration as well as Venezuelan civil society had been deteriorating for months beforehand; according to The Washington Post, quoting two sources "close to the White House", Machado had committed the "ultimate sin" in Trump's eyes of accepting the 2025 Nobel Peace Prize instead of turning it down and passing it to him. Machado confirmed on 6 January that she had no contact with Trump since October 2025 when she was announced as the Nobel winner, and voiced discontent with Trump's decision to back Rodríguez, saying she was "nothing like a moderate" and that the US expected her to take steps toward democracy.

Machado dubbed Rodríguez "one of the main architects ... of repression", saying everyone was familiar with her record; she also insisted that she "absolutely" qualified for the leadership of the country and lauded Trump's "leadership and courage" in taking out Maduro.

On 15 January, María Corina Machado met privately with Donald Trump and later with multiple US senators. Machado presented her Nobel Medal to Donald Trump as a way to sway him to give the opposition a role in determining Venezuela's future. Machado has plans to go back to Venezuela as soon as possible. She said that "This has nothing to do with tension or relations between Delcy Rodriguez and myself," and discussed that the "criminal structure" that has dominated Venezuela for years would eventually dismantle itself. A week later, Trump said he was considering involving Machado in his plans on Venezuela in some way, without specifying which role she would play.

On 26 January, after a hearing on Venezuela on the US Senate, Marco Rubio met with Machado. She later said to reporters that a change in Venezuela was coming. Venezuelan TV network Venevisión broadcast Machado message after meeting with Rubio. According to the Venezuelan national press workers union, the state regulator later cut Venevision's access to some satellite TV providers. In an interview of NBC, Delcy Rodríguez said about Machado that "She will have to answer to Venezuela why she called upon a military intervention, why she called upon sanctions to Venezuela, and why she celebrated the actions that took place at the beginning of January."

At Machado's request, she met for a second time with Donald Trump in the White House on 6 March to review plans for her trip to come back to Venezuela.

In September 2026, Machado's reported about seven failed attempts to enter the country by air and sea, at least three while Delcy Rodríguez was away during a UN General Assembly. In October 2026, she was able to return to Venezuela after 10 month in exile.

=== Political prisoner release and amnesty bill ===
Jorge Rodríguez announced on 8 January 2026 that an "important" number of political prisoners would be released as a "gesture" by the government. Of an estimated 800 political prisoners in Venezuela, nine prisoners were released that day.

The US had previously requested the release of political prisoners, and Trump declared in an interview "they've been great ... Everything we've wanted, they've given us." Trump announced on 9 January that he had cancelled a second wave of attacks due to cooperation and the release of political prisoners.

The United Nations Human Rights Council-mandated Independent International Fact-Finding Mission on Venezuela reported that about 50 out of the estimated 800 political prisoners in Venezuela were released as of 12 January, saying it fell short on the Venezuelan government's international human rights obligations, and called for the "immediate and unconditional" release of all political prisoners. Local NGOs reported that those released weren't "free", as they remained subject to restrictions and trial.

On 23 January, Foro Penal confirmed 154 political prisoners released since 8 January. The same day, Delcy Rodríguez announced 626 prisoners released without providing a specific date. She called for the Office of the United Nations High Commissioner for Human Rights, led by Volker Türk to verify the lists.

On 30 January, Delcy Rodríguez announced a general amnesty bill covering the "entire period of political violence from 1999 to the present", dating back to when Hugo Chávez first assumed his presidency. People convicted of murder, drug trafficking, corruption or human rights violations will not qualify under the amnesty law. The measure was long requested by the US-backed Venezuelan opposition. Opposition leader María Corina Machado said that the bill was not taken "voluntarily, but rather in response to pressure from the US government". Rodríguez also announced the shutdown of El Helicoide prison, which she said would be transformed into a cultural and sport center. Independent organizations have documented many cases of torture and human rights violation in El Helicoide. Family of some of the prisoners gathered outside El Helicoide chanting "Freedom!".

Venezuelan opposition politician and ally of Machado, Juan Pablo Guanipa, was released from prison on 8 February but taken by unknown armed groups hours later; by 10 February, his family confirmed he was under house arrest in Maracaibo, calling the measure unjust detention.

On 19 February, the amnesty law was approved by the National Assembly of Venezuela. Jorge Rodríguez said that over 1557 request liberty a day after. Juan Pablo Guanipa was also released from house arrest. During the 2026 State of the Union Address, Trump invited Venezuelan politician Enrique Márquez, who was imprisoned in 2025 and was released in early January. Trump said "Since the raid we have worked with the new leadership and they have ordered the closure of that vile prison and released hundreds of political prisoners already, with more to come."

=== Oil deals, privatization reform, mining and ease of sanctions ===
Secretary of State Rubio testifies on Trump's military actions in Venezuela before the Senate Foreign Relations Committee on 28 January 2026.

On 14 January, the United States Department of Energy announced that the United States had completed their first sales of Venezuelan oil valued at $500 million as part of a $2 billion deal between United States and Venezuela governments. On 15 January, Delcy Rodríguez announced that she was submitting a reform to the country's hydrocarbon law to "allow [foreign] investment flows to be incorporated into new fields, fields where no investment has ever been made and into fields where there is no infrastructure"; On 20 January, Delcy Rodríguez confirmed having received the first $300 million. She announced the money will go to the exchange market in Venezuela, the national banks and the central bank. Reuters indicated that the remaining $200 million were returned on 3 February according to anonymous United States officials. The proceeds from the sales were deposited in a Qatari bank account, preventing Venezuela's creditors from seizing them. Democrats questioned the legality of this arrangement, and criticized the lack of transparency in routing the funds.

On 23 January, the first cargo of 460,000 barrels of naphtha by Vitol, necessary to deal with the heavy crude oil, arrived to Venezuela in a deal with the United States. Before that last cargo was received in December 2025 by Chevron Corporation in an agreement with the United States as the naval blockade had stopped many suppliers.

On 28 January, Delcy Rodríguez announced that the United States was unfreezing various funds related to 2019 oil sanctions on Venezuela. The next day, Reuters announced that an US refiner, Citgo, bought Venezuelan oil for the first time since 2019.

On the US Senate hearing on 28 January, US secretary of state Marco Rubio stated that "The funds from that (oil sales) will be deposited into an account that we will have oversight over," Rubio said, adding that the US Treasury would audit the expenses of the Venezulan government only on sanctioned oil so that it is used in favor of medicines or measures that would help the Venezuelan population. He said, "will spend that money for the benefit of the Venezuelan people."

Rodríguez signed the hydrocarbon reform into law on 29 January. The law allows private and foreign companies to operate oil projects under contracts over production and sales, lowers certain taxes, expands the oil ministry's authority, and permits asset transfers and outsourcing. Proposals by opposition lawmakers on grant transparency and require National Assembly approval for oil contracts were rejected. Oil industry workers participated in a demonstration to celebrate the bill approval. The law reverted 2006 oil industry changes by Hugo Chávez to make state company PDVSA the main stakeholder in all oil projects. In parallel, the US Treasury's Office of Foreign Assets Control lifted various oil-related sanctions imposed on Venezuela, authorizing US companies to buy, sell, transport, store and refine Venezuelan crude oil. US sanctions on production of oil were not lifted. Trump administration also announced that additional sanctions will be lifted soon.

More sanctions were eased on 13 February, with the issue of two licenses allowing international companies to operate oil and gas projects in Venezuela and to negotiate contracts. Payments go to a US-controlled foreign government deposit fund. US energy secretary that visited the Venezuela in February, said that oil sales have hit $1 billion since January and would hit another $5 billion in months.

The US Treasury Department indicated that companies working of Venezuelan oil trade have to pay local taxes, permits and fees to the government of Venezuela, while royalties and federal taxes must be paid into a fund managed by the United States.

During the 2026 State of the Union Address, Trump announced that the US "just received from our new friend and partner, Venezuela, more than 80 million barrels of oil."

According to the Reuters in February, the Venezuelan oil ministry cancelled 19 contracts with private companies on oil and gas in Venezuela signed under the government of Nicolás Maduro. Venezuelan and US administrations are reviewing the credentials of the companies that signed them.

In March, the United States issued a license to authorize the trade of Venezuelan gold and allow deals with Minarven, Venezuela's state-owned gold mining company.

On 28 August 2026, President Donald Trump announced that the United States had reached an oil agreement with Venezuela's interim government, led by Delcy Rodríguez. Trump stated on his social media platform that the agreement would give the United States majority control over 65 billion barrels of proven oil reserves in Venezuela. He said the deal had been brokered through a partnership with private business and mediated by Secretary of State Marco Rubio and Secretary of Defense Pete Hegseth. Trump claimed that the agreement came "at no cost to the American taxpayer" and would more than double U.S. oil reserves. Few details were disclosed regarding the legal and financial structure of the agreement, including which fields or companies were involved, or how the United States would exercise majority control over the reserves.

The Washington Post reported that under the arrangement the United States had gained a controlling stake in nearly a quarter of Venezuela's untapped oil reserves, becoming the majority owner of a newly formed joint venture holding 100-year contracts at the fields, and that a list of 17 oil fields in which the United States would take a stake had circulated before the announcement. According to deal points reviewed by the newspaper, the United States government's stake would be split between equity ownership and guarantees that it would purchase oil produced by the venture at cost to refill the Strategic Petroleum Reserve. Several of the fields lacked infrastructure or access to transport hubs, and those where such infrastructure existed had suffered years of neglect and theft of machinery; the newspaper reported that it was unclear who would make the tens of billions of dollars of investment needed before oil could be pumped, major oil companies having largely regarded such spending as too risky. Secretary of State Marco Rubio said the agreement would bring nearly $100 billion in private investment to Venezuela, without specifying which companies had committed to such spending.

The principal private Venezuelan participant would be North American Blue Energy Partners, controlled by Alejandro Betancourt López, a businessman who has been the subject of money-laundering investigations in several countries and who has not been charged. The Defense Department, through its Office of Strategic Capital, would oversee and help fund the oil field licenses, according to people familiar with the discussions; Bloomberg News first reported the involvement of the company and the Pentagon. Pentagon spokesman Sean Parnell said the office could not take an ownership stake in private companies and that its role was "strictly limited to providing capital assistance in the form of a loan, loan guarantee, or technical assistance". The newspaper noted that any United States expenditures or loans needed to develop the fields would probably require congressional approval, and that earlier announcements of United States stakes in Ukraine's critical minerals and in Westinghouse had not produced the developments the administration had forecast. The New York Times reported that the State Department put the United States' share at 55 per cent of the joint venture's output, and that the United States would hold the right to acquire shares in the Venezuelan partner through a warrant. Delcy Rodríguez endorsed the agreement, saying it would have a "significant impact on our nation's revival" and generate more than $200 billion in tax revenue for the government. The newspaper reported that Chevron was separately in advanced talks to expand its own production in the country. It also reported that any meaningful new production would take years to materialise, so the agreement would have little immediate effect on global commodity prices or on what United States consumers pay for fuel; Venezuela was producing a little over one million barrels a day, about one per cent of global output and roughly the same share as under Maduro.

The announcement followed earlier reports that the Trump administration had been in advanced negotiations to acquire a direct stake in Venezuelan oilfields. These reports had already generated unease among members of Venezuela's opposition. One opposition figure, speaking anonymously due to the sensitivities of criticizing the United States, described the proposed arrangement as "a land grab – a massive land grab," adding that it was "revolting" and represented "a rapacious, mafioso United States," in contrast to the United States of the Marshall Plan.

Ricardo Hausmann, a former Venezuelan minister in exile and opposition supporter, wrote on X that an illegitimate interim government lacked the legitimacy to sign what he termed an unconstitutional agreement, and predicted that it would fail for all parties involved. Francisco Rodríguez, an economist, called on Venezuela's National Assembly to reject the deal, describing it as "predatory" and arguing that transferring Venezuelan oil wealth to the United States was unconstitutional and not in the country's interest, particularly when carried out under the threat of force. Gregory Brew, an energy historian and analyst at the Eurasia Group, expressed skepticism about the agreement, predicting significant opposition to any deal that would give the U.S. government effective control over Venezuelan resources. He compared the arrangement to the early 20th-century control exercised by the Anglo-Persian Oil Company over oil resources in Iraq and Iran, and suggested that for Trump, control over oil appeared to be an objective in itself, with the arrangement carrying colonial overtones.

On 31 August, The New York Times reported that the arrangement would give the Defense Department the option to acquire up to 35 per cent of the parent company of Betancourt's firm through a warrant, described by two people familiar with the deal as a penny warrant convertible into shares for as little as one cent. The White House said the same day that the partnership came "all at zero cost to the United States", that the federal government would be guaranteed 20 per cent of the company's output at production cost with the State Department holding a right of first refusal over the remainder, and that the United States would hold a veto over appointments to the company's board, a majority of whose members would have to be American citizens. The statement contradicted Parnell's assertion that the Office of Strategic Capital does not take equity stakes in private companies. The office, established in 2022 under defense secretary Lloyd Austin to lend to firms supplying the defense industrial base, reports to deputy defense secretary Stephen A. Feinberg, who approves its transactions, and its lending authority had grown from $1 billion to $100 billion. Jack Reed, the ranking Democrat on the Senate Armed Services Committee, called the effort "a blatant abuse of power and taxpayer dollars" and demanded a full accounting of its legal authority and financial terms.

=== Elections in Venezuela ===
According to the Constitution of Venezuela, in the event of the president becoming permanently unavailable to serve, a new election must be held within 30 days; in the event of them becoming temporarily unable to serve, the vice president acts as president for up to 90 days, which can be extended by vote of the National Assembly. The Supreme Court ruled that his absence was temporary, not permanent.

Nicolás Maduro Guerra, Venezuelan congressman and son of Nicolás Maduro, declared on 27 January 2026 that elections in Venezuela are "not on the table" as his father was "kidnapped".

On the US Senate hearing on 28 January, US secretary of state Marco Rubio was questioned about Venezuela. When discussing the goal of the intervention he answered "What's the end state? We want a Venezuela that has legitimate democratic elections."

In an interview for Politico in February, Machado said that she had not spoken with Trump about elections in Venezuela, but she estimated that with manual voting an election could be held in 9 to 10 months. In an interview for Newsmax, Jorge Rodríguez ruled out elections in the short term, stating "The only thing I can say is that there will be no elections in this immediate period in which stabilization must be achieved."

On 24 July, U.S. President Trump said that Venezuela was not ready to hold elections, but that it was making a lot of progress under acting President Rodriguez who has "been doing a fantastic job".

=== Joint arrest operation and extradition of Saab ===
Maduro's industry minister Alex Saab, released from the United States in 2023 in a prisoners exchange with Venezuela, was dismissed from his role on 16 January by acting president Delcy Rodríguez. She merged the industry and the commerce ministry. According to US officials, Saab and the head of the Globovisión TV network Raúl Gorrín were arrested in February by Bolivarian National Intelligence Service (SEBIN) in a joint operation between Venezuela and the United States. They are expected to be extradited to the United States.

The Venezuelan government announced on 16 May that Saab was deported to the United States. He is a possible witness against the prosecution of Nicolás Maduro.

=== Alleged insider betting prior to the operation ===
Indictment of Gannon Ken Van Dyke

On 23 April 2026, U.S. Army Master Sergeant Gannon Ken Van Dyke was arrested for allegedly placing more than US$33,300 in bets on the prediction site Polymarket based around whether or not Maduro would be "out by January 31, 2026" ("out" likely meaning removed from office). When the bets were successful, Van Dyke gained more than US$409,000 in winnings. According to an unsealed indictment in the Southern District of New York, Van Dyke was charged with theft of nonpublic government information, commodities fraud, wire fraud, unlawful use of confidential government information for personal gain, and engaging in monetary transactions from unlawful activity. According to the Justice Department, Van Dyke was involved in the planning and execution of the operation to capture Maduro. Van Dyke entered a not guilty plea on 28 April 2026. A federal judge set the tentative date of Van Dyke's trial to 7 December 2026.

=== Joint operation against Niño Guerrero ===
In June 2026, a military operation was carried to kill Héctor Rusthenford Guerrero Flores, known as Niño Guerrero, the leader of the Venezuelan criminal gang Tren de Aragua. US president Donald Trump announced that Guerrero was killed in a airstrike on 12 June in Venezuela conducted in coordination with Venezuelan authorities. Venezuelan officials confirmed their participation in the operation.

== Reactions and response ==
=== Venezuela ===
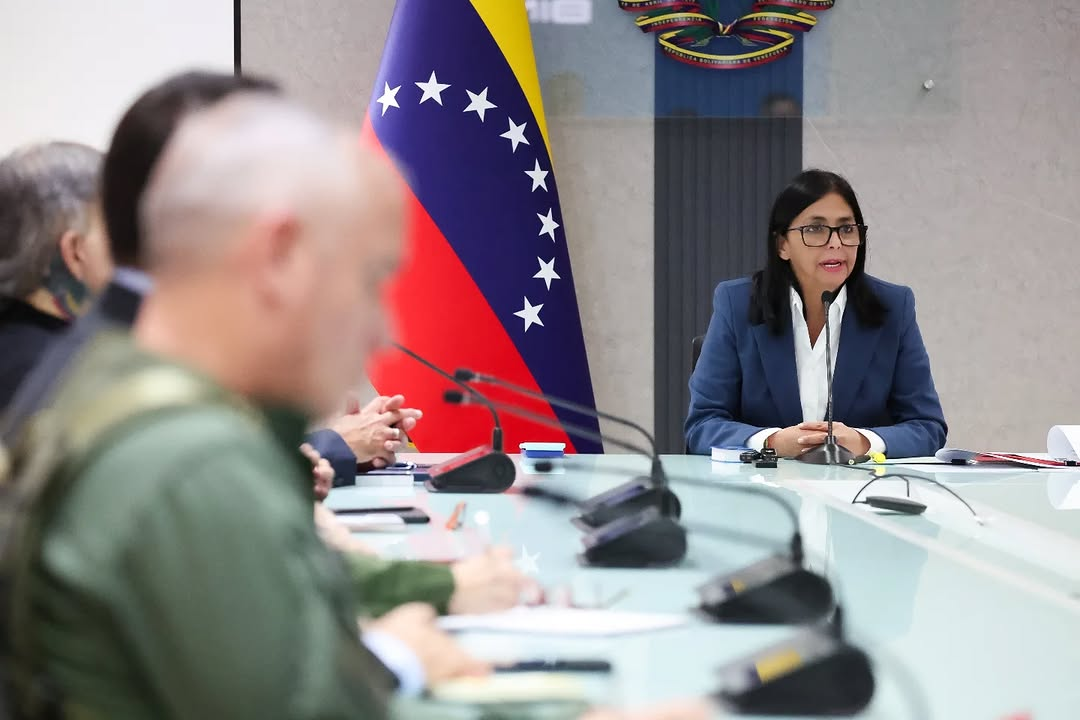
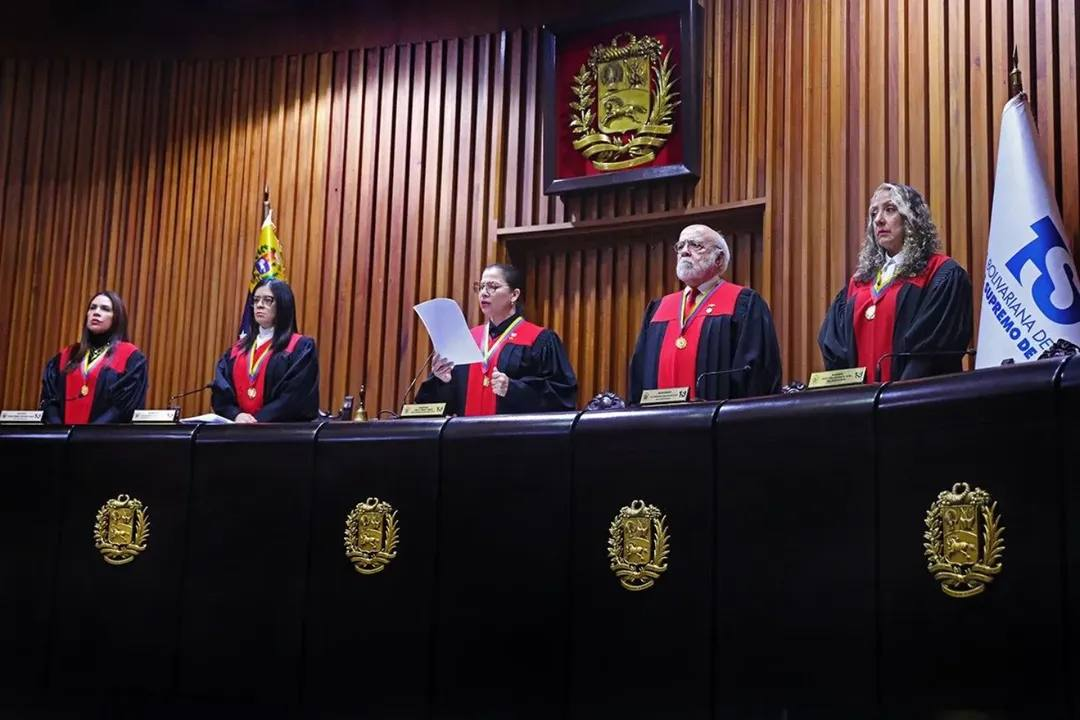
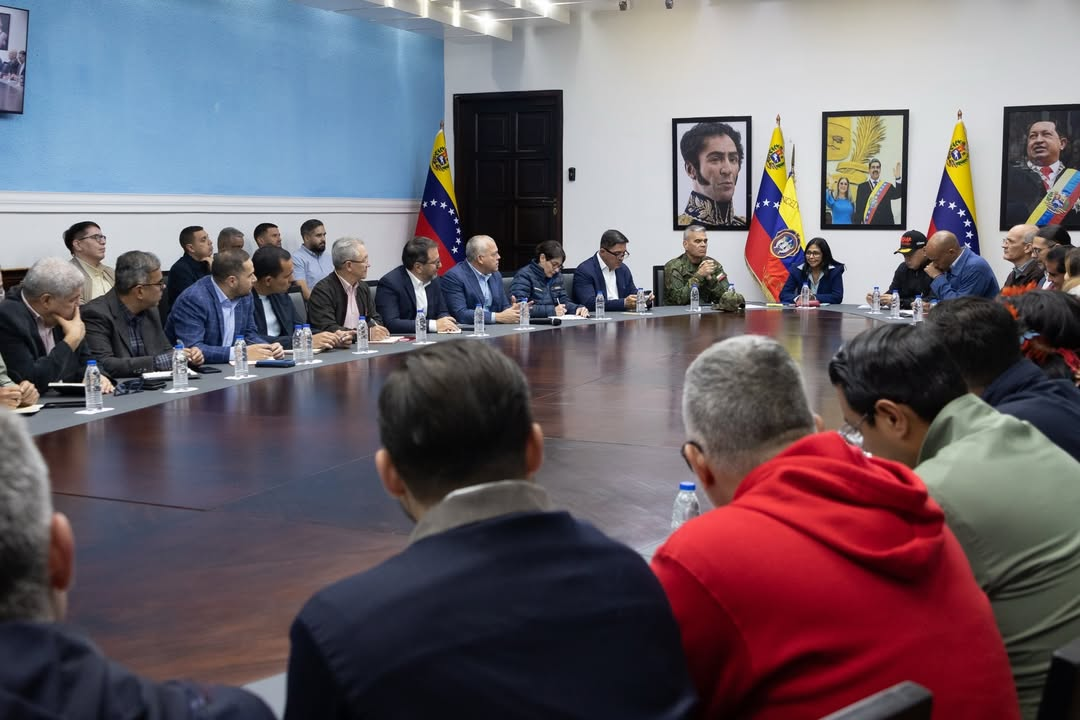
Clockwise from the top:
- Vice President Rodríguez leads a meeting at Miraflores Palace following the US strikes in Venezuela, on 3 January 2026
- Rodríguez leads the 757th Council of Ministers meeting on 4 January 2026
- The Supreme Tribunal of Justice order Rodríguez to become the acting head of state

Before Maduro's capture, the Venezuelan government said it rejected and denounced the military aggression, and issued a public statement blaming the US government for the strikes, which it attributed to a plan to seize Venezuelan resources, particularly oil reserves. Defense Minister Vladimir Padrino López stated that the attacks were illegal. He also said that Venezuela would resist foreign troops and that the government had declared a "state of external commotion", a type of state of emergency, following "Maduro's orders".

Vice President Delcy Rodríguez stated that Venezuela "will never again be anyone's colony – neither of old empires, nor of new empires, nor of empires in decline". She argued that the "war on drugs" was a pretext, claiming the United States' true objective was regime change and control of the country's "energy, mineral and natural resources". Rodríguez also referred to the US attack on Venezuela as "Zionist".

Unitary Platform politician María Corina Machado published a statement from exile, saying that "what had to happen" for the opposition to take up the mandate they claimed from the 2024 presidential election "is happening". She also said the presidency should be assumed by Edmundo González, who received a majority of the vote in the 2024 presidential election, according to international observers and election-watchers. González said the opposition was ready to "rebuild our nation" and that the next few hours would be "decisive". Machado, who won the 2025 Nobel Peace Prize, offered to share her award with Trump, calling the United States strike as "historic" and thanking him on behalf of the Venezuelan people. The Nobel Prize Committee rejected her request and clarified that the prize "cannot be revoked, shared or transferred".

=== United States ===
According to Trump, the US would "run" Venezuela until there is a "safe, proper and judicious transition". Trump went on to say that the US and US companies would seize Venezuelan oil and sell it to other countries. Trump said the US would be "very strongly involved" in the Venezuelan oil industry, and that US oil companies would invest billions of dollars in the energy sector of the country. Secretary of Defense Pete Hegseth said "We are going to get American companies in there" to invest in the Venezuelan oil industry, resulting in "access to additional wealth and resources" for the US. The government also indicated that American oil companies would have to invest in rebuilding Venezuelan oil infrastructure as a prerequisite for being compensated for previous asset seizures by the Venezuelan government since the first nationalization nearly 50 years ago.

Vice President JD Vance stated that the operation was justified as Maduro was wanted in the US. He also declared that "the stolen oil must be returned". Chairwoman Lisa McClain of the House Republican Conference called Maduro a "narcoterrorist" and said that "Trump didn't look the other way; he acted." After initially expressing uncertainty about the justification of US actions, Republican senator Mike Lee later said they "likely" fell under the president's Article II powers to protect against "actual or imminent attack".

Florida Senators Rick Scott and Ashley Moody, along with Representative Carlos Gimenez, held a press conference in Doral praising the capture of Maduro. Scott, who said he received a phone call from Secretary of State Marco Rubio early Saturday morning, also praised Venezuelan opposition leader María Corina Machado for her role in the events. Gimenez stated that Trump had also "turned his eye" toward Cuba, noting that "the Cuban regime is at the weakest point it's been in a very, very long time." Governor Ron DeSantis supported the operation and said that the Attorney General of Florida was “looking very seriously” at the possibility of filing state charges against Maduro aside from the federal indictment, accusing him of bring drugs and violent criminals to Florida.

Democratic senator Brian Schatz, a member of the Senate Foreign Relations Committee, warned against any US military involvement in Venezuela, saying that the United States has "no vital national interests in Venezuela to justify war". Democratic senator Ruben Gallego said "this war is illegal". Democratic senator Tim Kaine condemned the actions and called on Congress to support his resolution to block the use of the armed forces against Venezuela unless authorized by Congress. Senator Bernie Sanders also condemned the strikes, citing a risk of global instability and accusing Trump of bypassing Congress to get the country into war. Former vice president Kamala Harris criticized the strikes. The mayor of New York City, Zohran Mamdani, said he called Trump earlier that day to express his opposition to the strikes.

In a 3 January 2026 editorial, The New York Times editorial board condemned the attack as "dangerous and illegal", describing it as an act of "latter-day imperialism" which lacked "any semblance of international legitimacy, valid legal authority or domestic endorsement". Comparing the attack to interventions in Libya, the war in Afghanistan, and US involvement in Nicaragua, it warned of the "potential for chaos in Venezuela", including violence from paramilitary groups such as the Venezuelan colectivos or the Colombian National Liberation Army (ELN), which operates in western Venezuela. The AFL-CIO condemned the attack, calling it unconstitutional. Many analysts liken the operation in Venezuela to prior operations, such as Operation Nifty Package which led to the capture of Panamanian military leader, Manuel Noriega, as well as Operation Red Dawn, which led to the capture of former Iraqi president, Saddam Hussein.

=== Cuba ===
In January 2026, First Secretary of the Communist Party of Cuba Miguel Díaz-Canel strongly condemned strikes in Venezuela and the subsequent capture of President Nicolás Maduro, labeling the actions as "state terrorism". On 15 January 2026, he was present, alongside 94-year-old former Cuban leader Raúl Castro, in a ceremony in Havana to pay tribute to 32 Cuban soldiers killed in the United States intervention in Venezuela.

=== Threats to other countries ===
Trump set his sights on a number of countries in the following days. Trump signaled an eagerness to apply pressure on Colombia and said when asked that a similar operation there "sounds good to me". Trump threatened Colombia's president Gustavo Petro, saying he has "cocaine mills and cocaine factories" and "likes making cocaine and selling it to the United States" but would not be doing it much longer. Trump had recently sanctioned the Colombian leader for his alleged reluctance to combat drug trafficking in the country. Petro promised to take up arms if he had to, and Colombia's Ministry of Foreign Affairs issued a statement opposing "an undue interference" in domestic politics. Days later Trump and Petro agreed in a phone call to work together on combating drug trafficking and domestic insurgency, with Petro demanding that Trump "strike hard" against the ELN in both Venezuela and Colombia; Petro said fighting the ELN "in the rear" was just as critical as attacking it inside Colombia.

Trump threatened Mexico and Cuba, saying the two nations needed to do more to earn US favor, but said the latter might "fall" without US interference; he also expressed hope that Mexico would act on its own. In an appearance on Hannity Trump said that "We are going to start now hitting land with regard to the cartels. The cartels are running Mexico". Newsweek noted that Trump had said land strikes were imminent before, but also that he had been doing the groundwork by designating cartels Foreign Terrorist Organizations. Trump also warned that Iran "would be hit very hard" if more demonstrators were killed during the protests occurring in the country.

==== Greenland ====
Trump renewed his talk of annexing Greenland, an autonomous territory of the Kingdom of Denmark, with CNBC noting that this prompted more serious concerns in the wake of Maduro's capture. The US already operates a military base in Greenland, Pituffik Space Base, and Denmark has indicated its openness to a heightened US military presence there, but Trump has been uninterested in anything less than a full US takeover, noting "that's what I feel is psychologically needed for success. I think that ownership gives you a thing that you can't do with, you're talking about a lease or a treaty. Ownership gives you things and elements that you can't get from just signing a document" and "When we own it, we defend it. You don't defend leases the same way, you have to own it". Asked "Psychologically important to you or to the United States?", he said: "Psychologically important for me."

Hours after the strikes Katie Miller, wife of White House Deputy Chief of Staff Stephen Miller, posted a picture of a Greenland in the colors of the American flag with the caption "SOON" on X, prompting a rebuke from Denmark's ambassador to the US that "we expect full respect" for Denmark's territorial integrity and the two countries, being close allies, should continue to work as such. Over the following days, Stephen Miller asked "by what right does Denmark assert control over Greenland?", said Denmark and nations in general unable to defend their territory forgo their claim, and that it was both the formal position of the US government and obvious for security that Greenland should be part of the US. Asked repeatedly whether he would rule out taking Greenland by force, he refused but said that such questions are moot: "Nobody's going to fight the United States militarily over the future of Greenland."

Trump emphasized the acquisition of Greenland by the US "from the standpoint of national security". The leaders of NATO members France, Germany, Italy, Poland, Spain, and the United Kingdom expressed their support for Denmark in a joint statement, stating that "Greenland belongs to its people, and only Denmark and Greenland can decide on matters concerning their relations", stressed they were keen on Arctic security but this had to be achieved by NATO allies collectively, and called for upholding the principles of the UN Charter, including sovereignty, territorial integrity, and the inviolability of borders. Hours later, White House press secretary Karoline Leavitt said that acquiring Greenland was "a national security priority of the United States", "vital to deter our adversaries in the Arctic region", and added: "The president and his team are discussing a range of options to pursue this important foreign policy goal, and of course, utilizing the US military is always an option at the commander in chief's disposal." Rubio emphasized that any acquisition of Greenland by the US would be negotiated rather than resort to military force, saying Trump's threats were mainly rhetorical and an effort to push Denmark into approving a US-friendly deal. In the following days Trump said the US is "going to do something [there] whether they like it or not", that "We're not going to have Russia or China occupy Greenland. That's what they're going to do if we don't. So we're going to be doing something with Greenland, either the nice way or the more difficult way" and "I would like to make a deal, you know, the easy way. But if we don't do it the easy way, we're going to do it the hard way," that "the fact that they had a boat land there 500 years ago doesn't mean that they own the land. [I'm] sure we had lots of boats go there also." Asked if obtaining Greenland or preserving NATO was his higher priority, he said "it may be a choice."

=== International ===
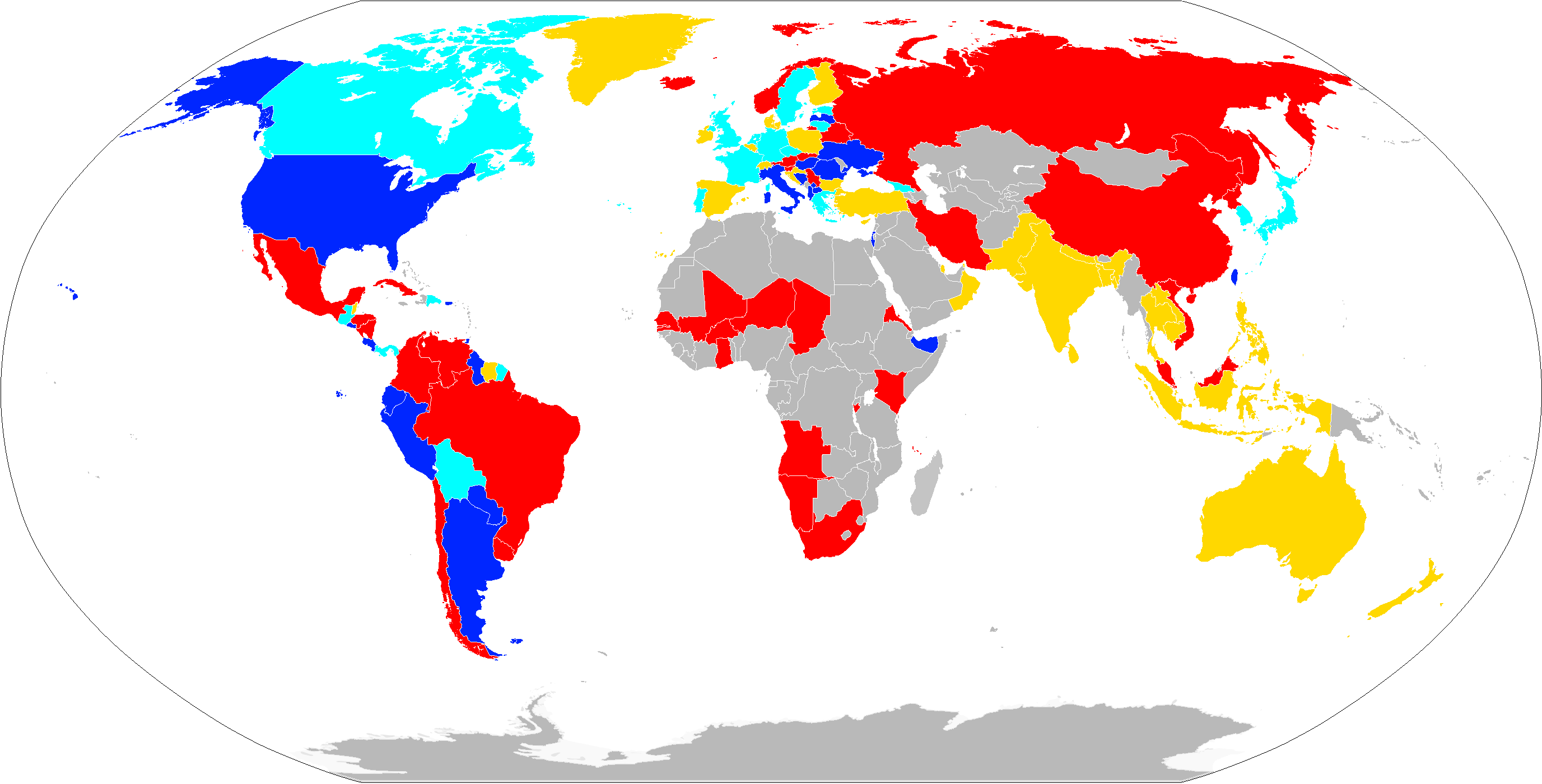
Reactions to the intervention: Countries that supported the US operation Countries that called for a democratic transition in Venezuela Countries that called for respect for international law Countries that condemned the intervention

Following the strikes, Venezuela's neighbors acted to contain fallout. Colombian president Gustavo Petro ordered the mobilization of security forces along the Colombia–Venezuela border in anticipation of a mass influx of Venezuelan refugees. On 5 January 2026, Petro, who was a former guerrilla fighter, warned that he would "take up arms" for his country if necessary after the US threatened him and his government, stating that any similar interventions in Colombia would have a response. On 8 January, thousands of Colombians protested against the intervention and the capture of Maduro, including the city of Cúcuta, near the Venezuelan border. On 10 January, the head of the largest FARC dissidents group, Nestor Gregorio Vera, called for other guerrilla groups to unite to face any US intervention.

Police in Trinidad and Tobago, which hosts the largest per-capita population of Venezuelan refugees and migrants, cordoned off key areas of the capital, Port of Spain. The government of Trinidad and Tobago, which has hosted US military personnel and vessels amid its recent buildup in the Caribbean Sea, stated that it did not participate in the attack. The government of Guyana, whose ongoing border dispute with Venezuela heated up in 2023–2024, had a muted response but were broadly supportive of the removal of Maduro. Guyanese president Irfaan Ali announced that the country's security forces were "fully mobilised" to deal with potential refugees and an increase in instability along the border. The Cuban government declared two days of national mourning on 5 and 6 January 2026 for its soldiers killed in the attacks. Later on 16 January, tens of thousands of Cubans gathered in the José Martí Anti-Imperialist Platform outside the US embassy in Havana to demonstrate against US actions in Venezuela, the killings of 32 Cuban officers in the attack, and to demand the release of Maduro. On 10 January, Nicaraguan authorities arrested over 60 people for supporting the capture of Maduro.

UN Secretary-General António Guterres stated that US actions had "worrying implications for the region", "constitute[d] a dangerous precedent", and worried "that the rules of international law have not been respected". He called on all Venezuelan actors to engage in an inclusive and democratic dialogue, stating "I welcome and am ready to support all efforts aimed at assisting Venezuelans in finding a peaceful way forward". At the request of China, Colombia, and Russia, the UNSC convened on 5 January 2026 to discuss the situation. Representatives of Russia and China called for the immediate release of President Maduro while the US representative rejected characterizations of US actions as military aggression, describing the operation as a targeted law enforcement measure to arrest an indicted fugitive.

The attack was condemned by other countries, including Brazil, Chile, China, France, Iran, Mexico, North Korea, Russia, Slovakia, South Africa, and Spain. Government leaders in Argentina, France, Germany, Israel, Peru, and Ukraine praised the developments. French president Emmanuel Macron initially expressed joy, declaring on social media that "Maduro is a dictator, and his departure is good news for Venezuelans. He confiscated the freedom of his people and stole the 2024 elections." However, days later he nuanced his message, saying that the method employed by the Americans "does not have the support or approval" of France. United Kingdom prime minister Keir Starmer said that he was happy for the fall of Maduro, and he would wait to know the facts before commenting further. José Antonio Kast, the president-elect of Chile, stated that Maduro was not the legitimate president of Venezuela, had "destabilized Latin America", called his capture "great news", and remarked that work remained and the "governments of Latin America must ensure that the entire apparatus of the regime relinquishes power and is held accountable". Spanish prime minister Pedro Sánchez urged de-escalation, stating that "[i]nternational law and the principles of the U.N. Charter must be respected"; this was echoed by European Union (EU) foreign policy chief and European Commission vice-president Kaja Kallas. The governments of Brazil, Colombia, Mexico, Spain, Uruguay, and the outgoing administration in Chile issued a joint statement rejecting the US action and expressed their concern saying that it could "constitute an extremely dangerous precedent for peace and regional security and endanger the civilian population".

Several international trade union organizations, including the International Trade Union Confederation, Trade Union Confederation of the Americas, and the World Federation of Trade Unions, condemned the attack.

Environmental NGOs, including Greenpeace and Oil Change International, have criticised the United States' oil-motivated actions in Venezuela and reiterated calls for a just transition away from fossil fuels.

The Federal Council of Switzerland decided to freeze any assets held in the country by Nicolás Maduro.

=== Celebrations ===
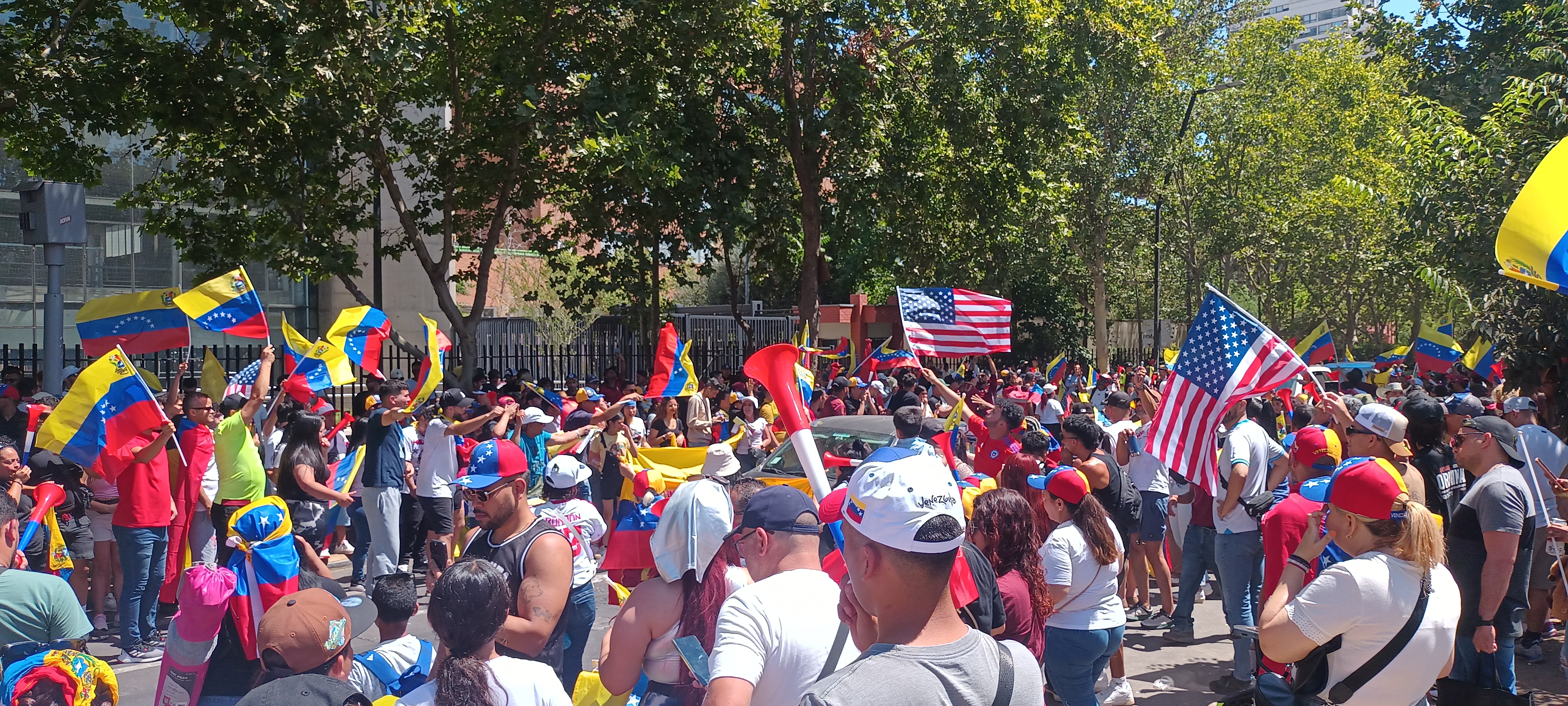
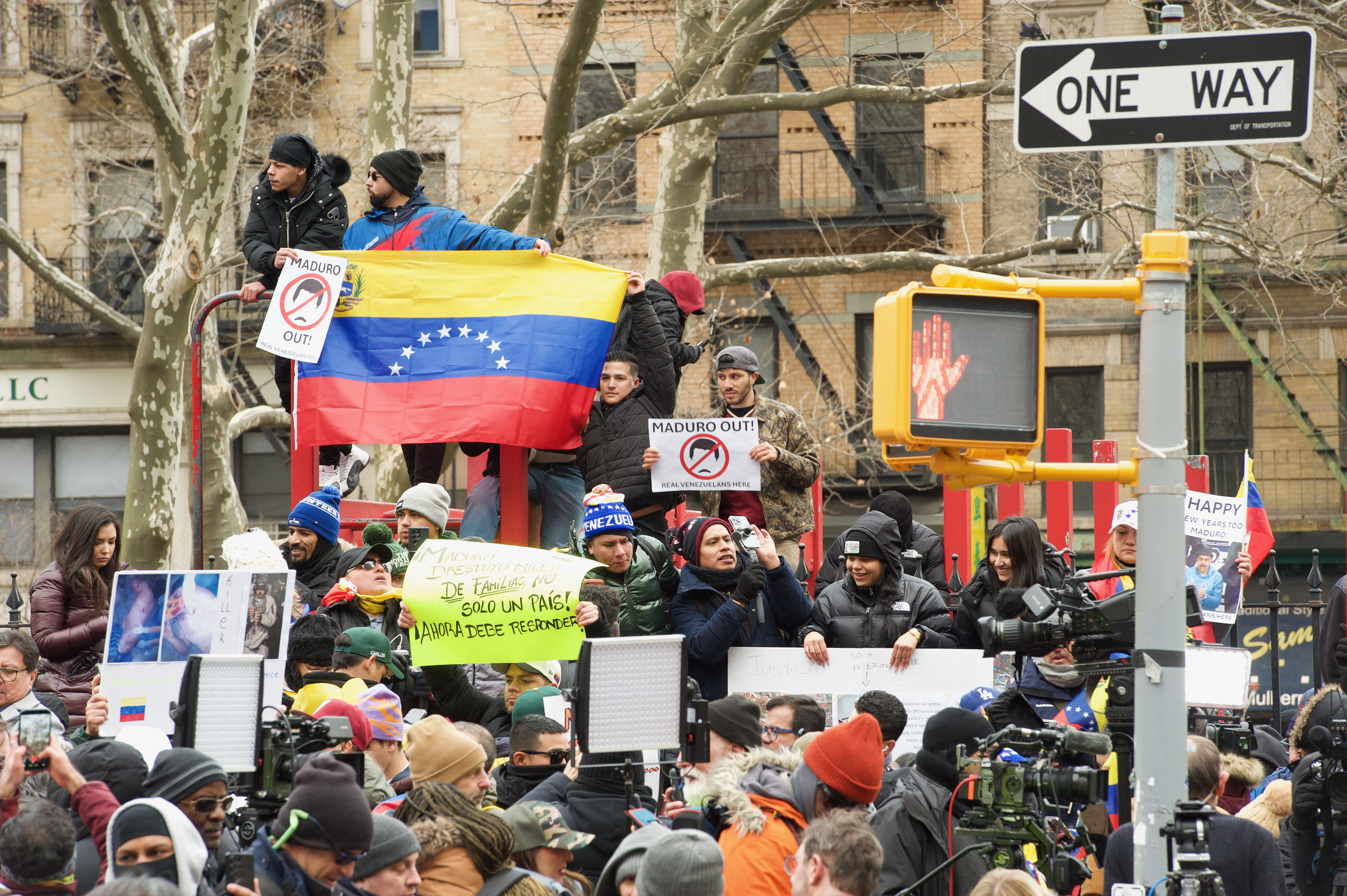
Venezuelans in Santiago, Chile, celebrating Maduro's capture (top), demonstrators outside of Nicolás Maduro's arraignment in New York City gathering in support of Maduro's capture (bottom)

Following Maduro's capture, demonstrations celebrating his removal and opposing his presidency occurred in Caracas, the capital and largest city of Venezuela.

Venezuelans living abroad celebrated Maduro's removal across the United States, Spain, and Latin America. In Doral, Florida, where the largest population of Venezuelans in the US live, Venezuelans filled the streets waving flags, singing, and chanting "freedom". Thousands of Venezuelans celebrated Maduro's fall in Madrid, Spain. Videos from the Colombian border city of Cúcuta showed crowds filling the streets on the night of 3 January 2026, dancing to music and chanting slogans like "virtue" and "a free Venezuela". Similar celebrations by Venezuelan expatriates and refugees took place in Buenos Aires in Argentina, Lima in Peru, Quito in Ecuador, and Santiago in Chile.

=== Protests ===
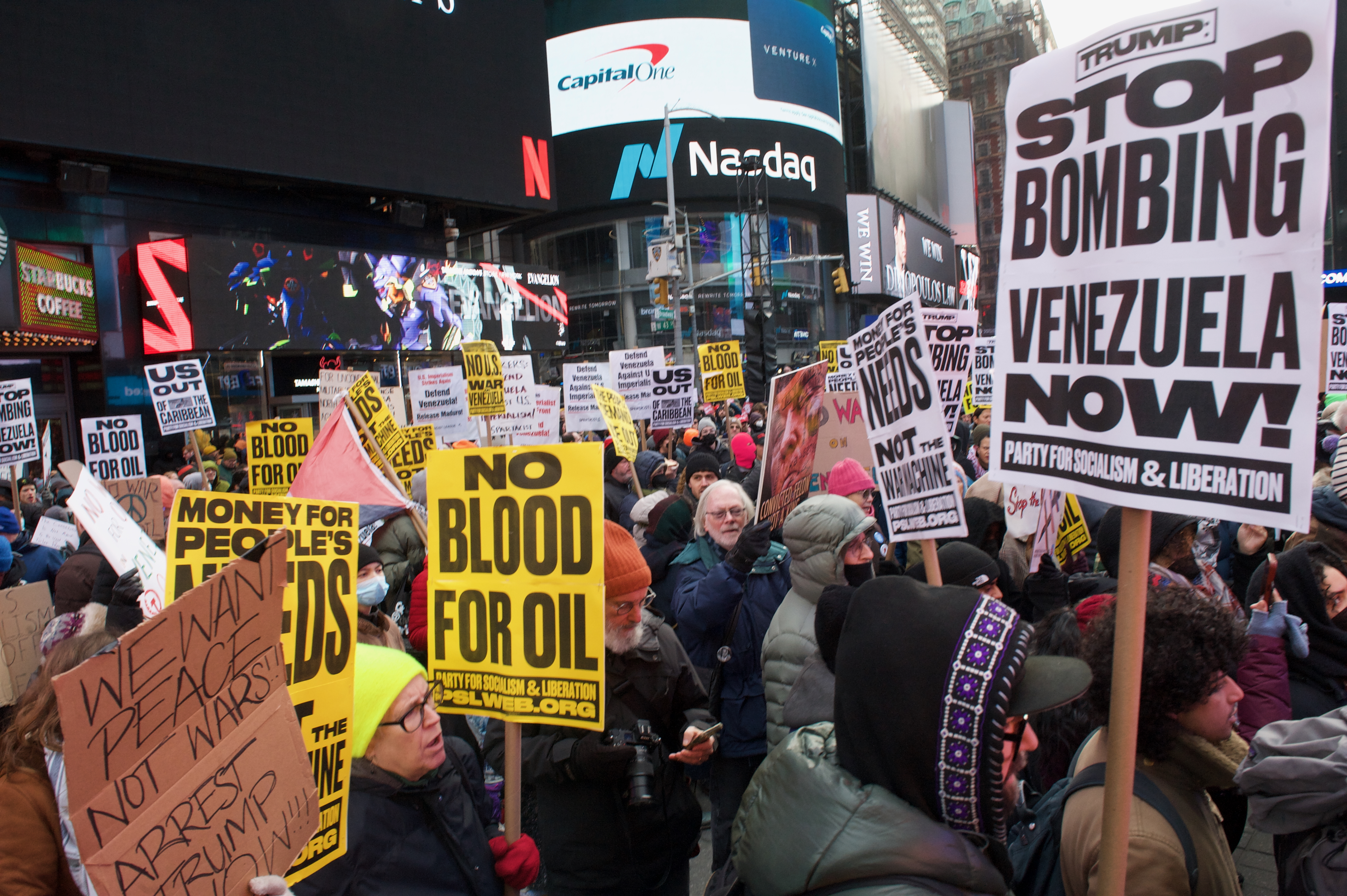
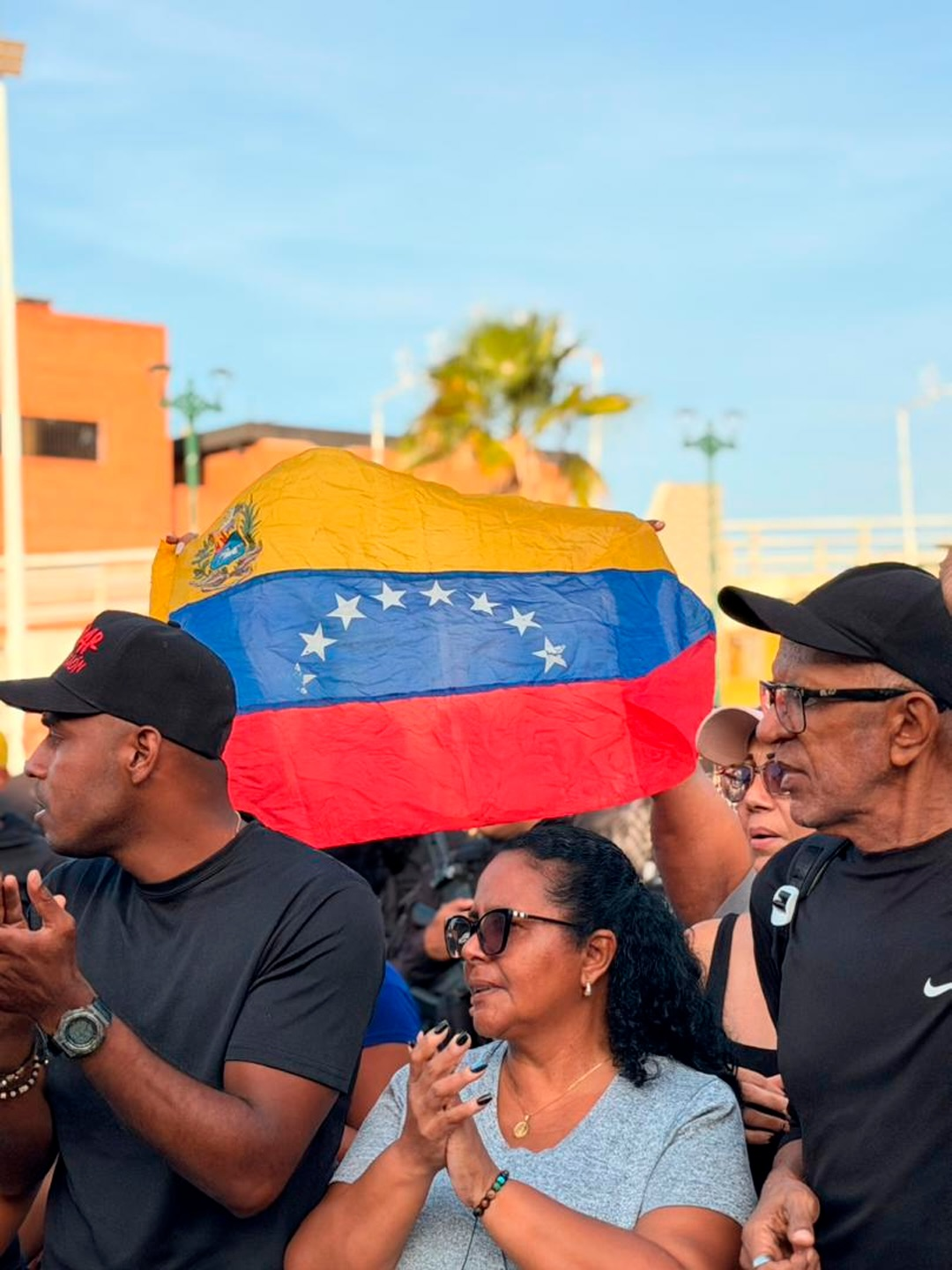
Demonstration in Times Square against the attack (left), demonstrators in Catia La Mar, Venezuela, protesting against US involvement (right)

Maduro's supporters protested against his capture in Caracas, with protesters holding portraits of Maduro and pro-Maduro and pro-Partido Socialista Unido de Venezuela (PSUV) banners. PSUV called for citizens to demand the release of Maduro and Flores. CNN reported that while some Venezuelans celebrated Maduro's ousting, others were skeptical of Trump's motives and condemned the capture of Maduro as a "kidnapping".

In the United States, hundreds of people gathered in New York City's Times Square to protest against the operation, with people chanting "Hands off Venezuela" and holding up signs that stated "US Out" and "No Blood for Oil". Outside of New York, hundreds of people in different cities gathered to voice opposition to the strikes. (Note: Attributed to multiple sources:)

One month after the strikes, the Venezuelan government called for a protest that gathered thousands of supporters for the release of Nicolás Maduro. His son Nicolás Maduro Guerra addressed the crowd, saying that the 3 January "will remain marked like a scar on our face, forever."

=== Financial markets and housing ===
Oil prices did not experience a surge, which had been normal with previous conflicts in oil-producing regions; prices increased 1% as of 5 January 2026. The reason is believed to be that Venezuela only represents 1% of the global oil supply and high oil production by other producers, including the United States, Saudi Arabia, and Brazil. The stock prices of companies that could become involved in Venezuela without spending money, such as oilfield service companies SLB and Halliburton, and refiners Valero Energy and Marathon Petroleum, surged on 5 January 2026. Some oil companies also saw increases, such as ExxonMobil and ConocoPhillips. Bonds issued by the Venezuelan government and the state oil company PDVSA surged by 30%. Venezuela's bonds went into default in 2017 and doubled in price during the escalating tensions in 2025.

Housing prices in Caracas rose from 20% to 50%. In touristic sites like Margarita Island the housing prices rose up to 80%. Some listing were paused waiting for a stabilization of the economy.

=== Polling ===
In October, before the strikes, a poll by AtlasIntel showed that approximately 64% of Venezuelans abroad support US military intervention to depose Maduro, compared with 34% within Venezuela. In December, a poll by Datanalisis found that 55% of Venezuelans opposed foreign military intervention while 23% supported it.

After the strikes, a poll by Reuters surveying 1,248 adults in the United States found that 33% of Americans approved of the military action, while 34% did not; 65% of Republicans supported the action compared to 11% of Democrats, and 72% of Americans were concerned that the US would get too involved in Venezuela, including 54% of Republicans. The same poll showed that Trump approval ratings rose to 42% after the attack, the highest rating since October 2025, when his approval rating was 39%.

A poll was made by The Economist on 9 January, surveying 600 Venezuelan residents of different ages and sex to reflect the national population. Most respondents were positive about the intervention, only 13% of respondents mildly opposed the capture of Maduro. The 18% of respondents oppose United States governance in Venezuela. Most respondents want a quick change of government, with 43% supporting María Corina Machado as the leader and 13% supporting Delcy Rodríguez. The 91% of respondents answering in support for a change of government within a year.

According to the Financial Times, a poll on 30 January by Gold Glove Consulting, a firm run by Mark Feierstein, former Latin America adviser to US president Barack Obama, found that 72% of those polled considered that Venezuela was moving in a positive direction after Maduro's capture. In comparison, in June 2024, three-quarters of respondents thought the country was going in negative direction. 58% said security had worsened since January. In case of elections, 67% favored Maria Corina Machado against 25% for Delcy Rodríguez. As for Rodríguez government actions so far, 37% thought was good or excellent, while 22% did not know and 41% said it was bad or very bad.

== Analysis ==
=== Political ===
International Crisis Group (ICG) analyst Elizabeth Dickinson disputed the success of the operation, noting that the Maduro regime appeared largely intact, with figures characterized as "hardliners" by Dickinson, such as Diosdado Cabello, occupying key posts such as the ministries of defense and the interior. Dickinson concluded that "removing Maduro did not necessarily change the fundamental equation of control", adding that the government has withstood sanctions by rewarding its allies with access to scarce resources. Another ICG analyst, Phil Gunson cautioned anti-Maduro forces among the Venezuelan diaspora, reporting from Caracas that "There's no dancing in the streets here". Months prior, Trump had previously denied seeking a change of power in Venezuela, saying he was targeting regime-aligned cartels rather than Maduro himself. Trump's evident willingness to work with Rodríguez was criticized by Venezuelan opposition sectors.

Carrie Filipetti, member of the Vandenberg Coalition think tank and former State Department official during the first Trump administration, believes that the US should focus on "turn[ing] back to the democratically-elected leadership" in Venezuela to ensure both American and Venezuelan security. She explains that the Venezuelan opposition, led by Maria Corina Machado, "have the inroads" and "connections to the military" to create a "successful, smooth transition" and make sure "this doesn't devolve into chaos". Center for Strategic and International Studies (CSIS) specialist Clayton Seigle said oil companies sought stability in Venezuela above all else, adding that the outlook for US interests in the country remained uncertain. Another CSIS expert, Christopher Hernandez-Roy, said Trump's reluctance to engage in full regime change was driven by fear of chaos, noting that, aside from Maduro's removal, the current regime remained unchanged.

American political analyst David Rothkopf described President Trump's conduct as the "Putinization of US foreign policy". Analysts Ryan C. Berg and Alexander B. Gray stated that the action showed a robust commitment to Trump's 2025 National Security Strategy (NSS) and a desire to increase preeminence in the Western Hemisphere, in turn signaling a "global reestablishment of deterrence" to countries such as China, alluding to the latter's investments in Venezuela. Atlantic Council Counterterrorism Project head Alex Plitsas urged an orderly transition, warning that instability in Venezuela could lead to political fragmentation and criminal violence involving colectivo gangs; Berg elaborated that any systemic change would likely be lengthy, while reinforcing the Trump administration's "America First" agenda.

Indian political analyst Brahma Chellaney argued that while the legal framing (drug trafficking charges) resembles the 1989 invasion of Panama and the seizure of Manuel Noriega, the actual methodology and strategic narrative align more closely with the 2003 invasion of Iraq. Douglas Farah, a national security consultant and president of IBI Consultants, compared the US invasion of Panama to the current geopolitical situation in Venezuela, warning that although the Panama operation was a relatively swift military victory, occupying Venezuela would present significantly greater challenges. Professor Sultan Barakat, an expert from Qatar's Hamad Bin Khalifa University, argued that the US actions in Venezuela have set a dangerous precedent that could influence China's approach to Taiwan. He also warned that this precedent could potentially encourage Russian president Vladimir Putin to adopt a more aggressive stance toward Ukrainian president Volodymyr Zelenskyy.

The Washington Post wrote that the lack of transparency and separation between business and diplomacy in the Trump administration's dictation of policy to the Venezuelan government has "raised questions about oversight in the affairs of the resource-rich nation that is emerging as a U.S. neo-colony."

=== Legality ===
Re: Proposed War Department Operation to Support Law Enforcement Efforts in Venezuela
- Created: 23 December 2025
- Signatories: T. Elliot Gaiser
- Subject: Legality under US law
- Purpose: Office of Legal Counsel (OLC) Memo

Official website
- Memo via DocumentCloud

International law experts argued that the operation may have violated international law. On 3 January 2026, United Nations Spokesperson Stéphane Dujarric issued a statement that said the UN Secretary-General António Guterres was "deeply alarmed by the recent escalation in Venezuela" and that United States' military action "has potential worrying implications for the region". Lawyer Geoffrey Robertson stated that the strike on Venezuela was contrary to Article 2(4) of the UN Charter and qualifies as a crime of aggression under international law. Elvira Domínguez-Redondo, professor of international law at Kingston University, also stated the strike was an act of aggression and that it could only have been lawful if it had authorization by a United Nations Security Council resolution, or was justified as "self-defense", but she added that there was "no evidence whatsoever" to support either condition.

Ben Saul, a UN special rapporteur and professor of international law, condemned "the US's illegal aggression against Venezuela and the illegal abduction of its leader and his wife" and called on Trump to be investigated and impeached. Professor of international law Michael N. Schmitt, law professor Ryan Goodman and Tess Bridgeman concluded that the operation against Venezuela "amounts to a severe breach of foundational principles of international law". Professor of law Ziyad Motala described the "intervention in Venezuela to abduct President Nicolás Maduro" as "international vandalism, plain and unadorned". UN experts described Trump's actions as constituting an "international crime of aggression", adding that these actions "represent a grave, manifest and deliberate violation of the most fundamental principles of international law, set a dangerous precedent, and risk destabilizing the entire region and the world".

The International Commission of Jurists (ICJ) stated that US attacks against Venezuela and the abduction of President Nicolás Maduro violate international law and the UN Charter, and warned against interference in Venezuela's political future.

=== Oil infrastructure ===
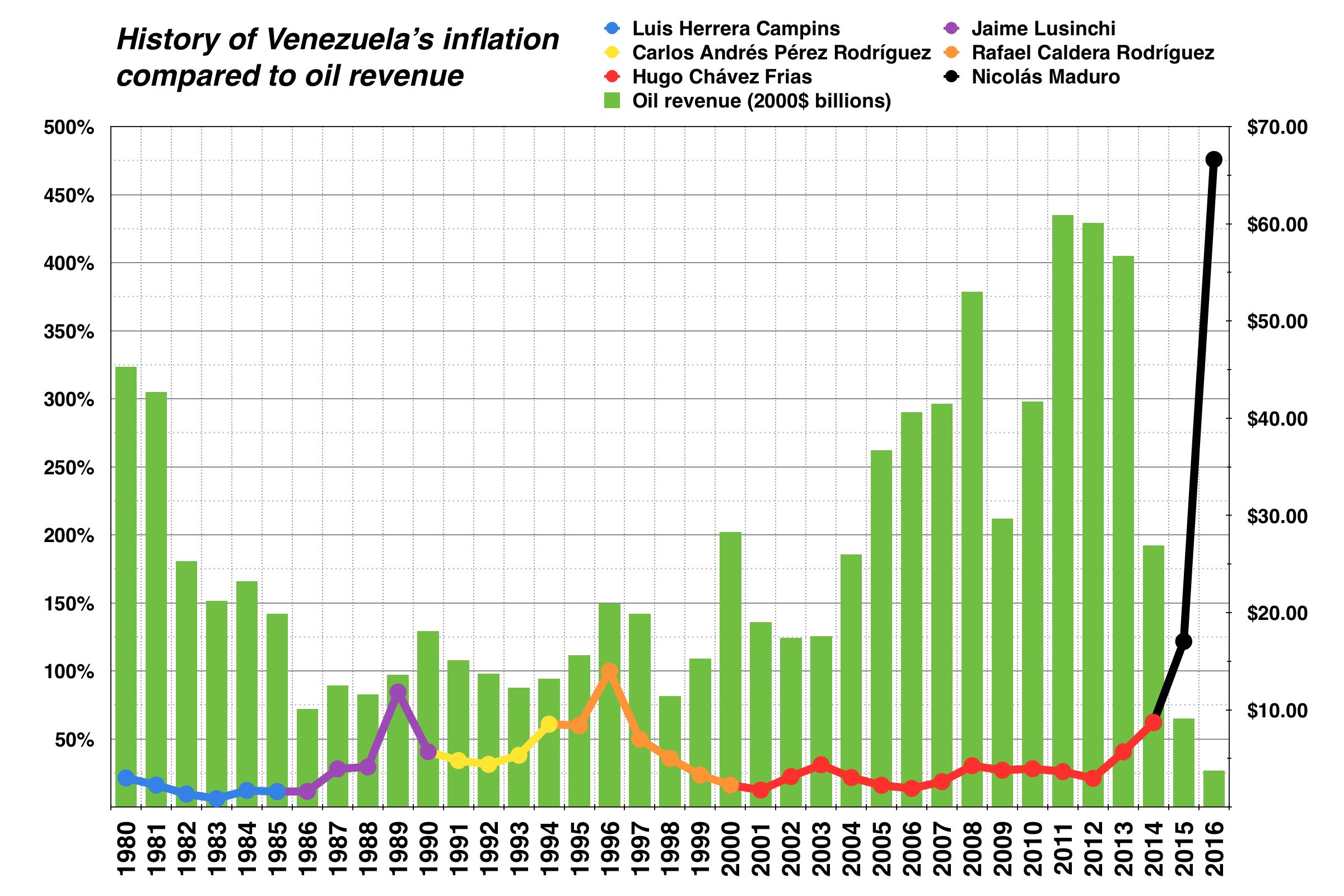
Venezuela's hyperinflation in the mid-2010s negatively impacted revenue from oil exports which magnified the decline of the industry.

Experts estimated that some 303 billion barrels of oil, or about 17% of the world's reserves, were located in Venezuela. Much of it is ultra-heavy crude, a dense, viscous, and high-sulfur type likened to a "semi-solid tar". Many US refineries along the Gulf Coast process this type of crude oil from Canada and Mexico to make diesel, jet fuel, asphalt, and elements of petrochemicals.

Venezuela's oil industry had been in decline since Hugo Chávez's wave of expropriations, during which former oil contracts were shifted to joint ventures with the state-owned Petróleos de Venezuela S.A. (PDVSA) and new fiscal rules were imposed. Legal instability and other risks drove away investors, which Venezuela could not compensate for because of its overreliance on PDVSA's "inefficient operations, economic instability, discretionary policies, and poor investor protection", worsened by US sanctions on the company since 2017. In this time, the industry's oil infrastructure declined, and China increased cheap imports from Venezuela.

Analysts, experts, and oil industry officials believed reconstruction could cost billions of dollars and take two to seven years or more, (Note: Attributed to multiple sources:) requiring risky investment and a lengthy process of creating contracts. (Note: Attributed to multiple sources:) Experts also said that US companies' refining capability could threaten China's presence in the Venezuelan oil industry. Larger oil companies are reportedly less interested in investing in Venezuela due to high investment costs and the country's political instability, while the smaller companies that are most interested have been described by industry officials as the "least prepared and least sophisticated" firms to do so.

== See also ==
- Manhunt (military)
- 1989 capture of Manuel Noriega, similar event
- 2003 capture of Saddam Hussein, similar event
- 2016 recapture of El Chapo, similar event
- 2026 Jalisco operation, similar event
- 2026 Iran war, occurred exactly 8 weeks later
- 2003 Invasion of Iraq
- Foreign policy of the second Trump administration
- List of state leaders deposed by foreign powers in the 20th and 21st century
