= Quebrada Sorocaima =

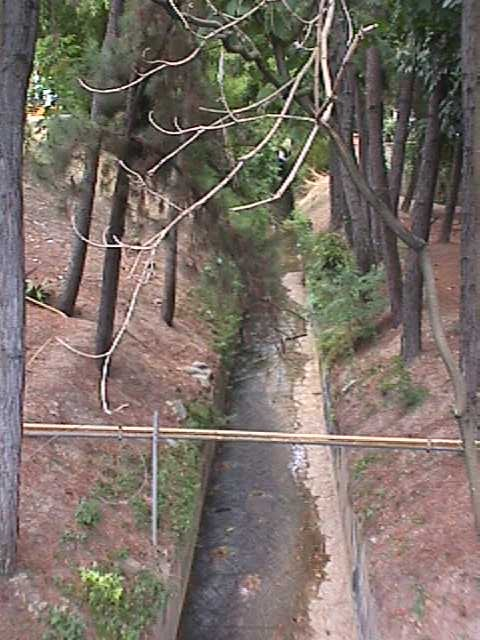

Location
- Country: Venezuela

Physical characteristics
- Source
  - location: western slope of Cerro El Volcán, Baruta
  - coordinates: 10°25′52″N 66°51′21″W
  - elevation: 1,150 m (3,770 ft)
- Mouth: Quebrada La Guairita in front of the entrance of the Teaching Medical Center La Trinidad
  - location: Baruta Municipality
  - elevation: 850 m (2,790 ft)
- Length: 3 km (1.9 mi)

Quebrada Sorocaima is a small river in the Mirandino sector of the city of Caracas, in Venezuela. Its waters flow through the municipality of Baruta in the state of Miranda.

It originates on the western slope of Cerro El Volcán, at 1150 m. It flows into the lower course of the Quebrada La Boyera, north of the entrance to the Teaching Medical Center La Trinidad (CMDLT).
