= Quebrada La Guairita =

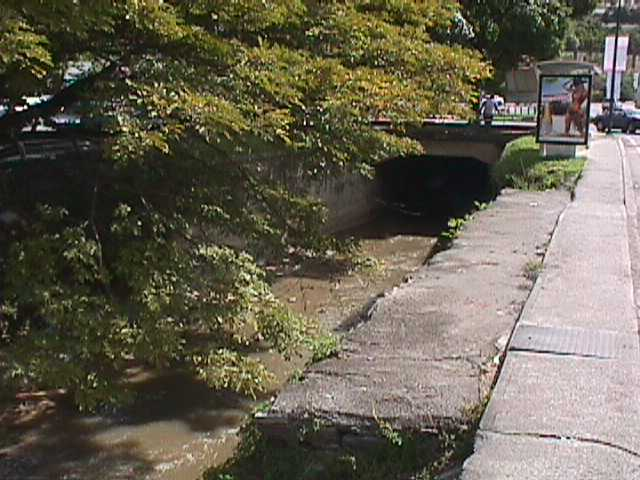

Location
- Country: Venezuela

Physical characteristics
- Source
  - location: Ojo de Agua in southern Baruta
  - coordinates: 10°25′21″N 66°52′15″W
  - elevation: 1,150 m (3,770 ft)
- Mouth: Guaire River at the height of the urbanization of El Encantado.
  - location: Baruta Municipality
  - elevation: 850 m (2,790 ft)
- Length: 12 km (7.5 mi)

Quebrada La Guairita is a small river that collects the waters of the streams from the areas of Baruta, La Trinidad, El Hatillo and El Cafetal in Venezuela, originating in the place known as Ojo de Agua in southern Baruta at an approximate height of 1,150 metres (3,770 ft).
