= Quebrada La Boyera =

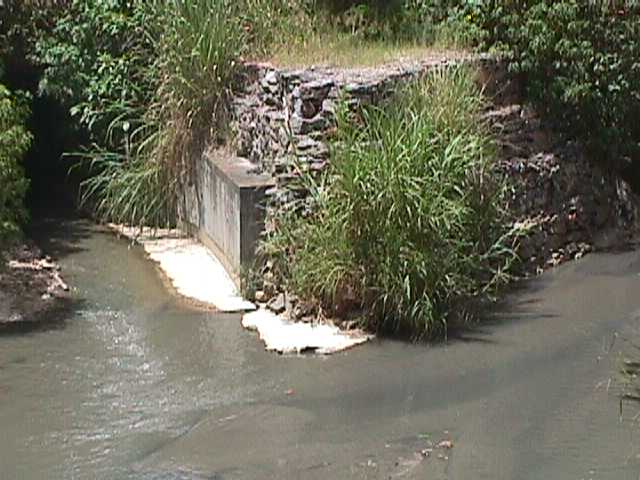

Location
- Country: Venezuela

Physical characteristics
- Source
  - location: Cerro El Volcán
  - coordinates: 10°26′6″N 66°51′35″W
  - elevation: 1,350 m (4,430 ft)
- Mouth: Quebrada La Guairita
  - location: El Hatillo Municipality
  - elevation: 975 m (3,199 ft)
- Length: 6 km (3.7 mi)

Quebrada la Boyera is a small river in the Mirandino sector of the city of Caracas in Venezuela. Its waters flow through the Municipalities of El Hatillo and Baruta of the state Miranda. It originates on the eastern slope of Cerro El Volcán in El Hatillo Municipality, at 1350 metres. It flows into the Quebrada La Guairita in the La Trinidad urbanization, in front of the north face of the Procter & Gamble building behind the building of the KFC La Trinidad at 975 metres.
