= Gloria Lizárraga de Capriles =

Venezuelan politician (1944–2021)

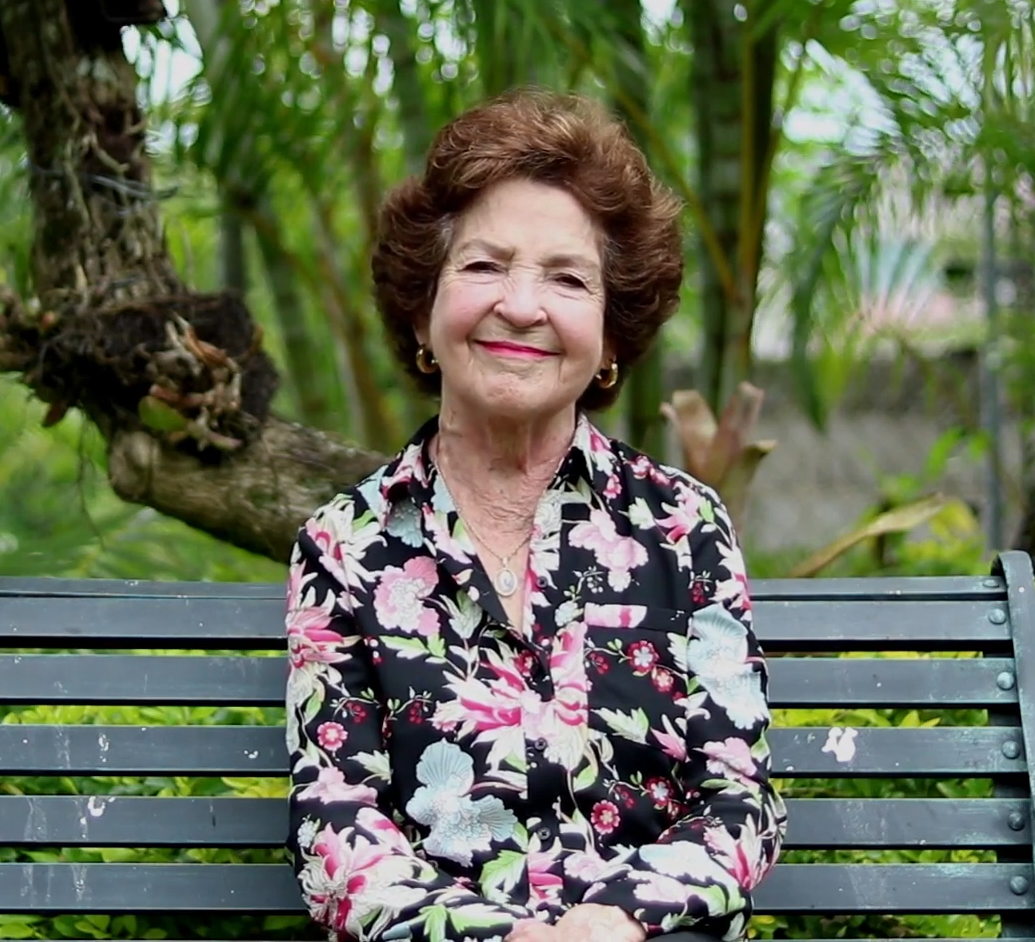

Mayor of Baruta
- In office 1989–1992
- Preceded by: Position created
- Succeeded by: Ángel Enrique Zambrano

Personal details
- Born: 2 May 1944
- Died: 31 March 2021 (aged 77)
- Political party: COPEI
- Spouse: Luis Felipe Capriles Ayala

Gloria Lizárraga de Capriles (2 May 1944 – 31 March 2021) was a Venezuelan politician who was the first mayor of the Baruta municipality elected by direct vote, as well as the first woman elected to the position. She has been described as one of the pioneering women in Venezuelan politics.

== Career ==
Involved in politics from a young age, Lizárraga de Capriles became a leader of the Copei political party from the age of 14.

Baruta was the first region to declare its autonomy from the Sucre district on 22 September 1987, which was later ratified by the Organic Law of Municipal Regime of 1989. This allowed the new municipality to participate in the regional elections later in the same year. Copei opted for the female leadership of Lizárraga, who was already known for her work in the communities. She was elected mayor of the municipality for the period 1989–1992 in the 1989 regional elections, the first to directly elect regional and local governors in Venezuela. Lizárraga's victory established a precedent in Caracas politics. When Chacao and El Hatillo achieved their autonomy as municipalities in 1992, they also elected women as mayors, Irene Sáez and Mercedes Hernández de Silva respectively.

Lizárraga had to build up the municipality's institutions from scratch since the former Sucre District had concentrated its powers in Petare, during a period of economic crisis and political instability after the Caracazo (a wave of protests, riots and looting). She recounted that the Office of the Mayor of Baruta initially operated on the third floor of the Plaza Las Americas shopping mall, with rented chairs and boxes instead of desks and file cabinets; that due to the lack of resources, she had to ask local businesses to pre-pay their taxes in order to fund the salaries of her employees; and that none of the administrative officials (including herself) were paid until a stable revenue stream was achieved.

Lizárraga created the first municipal police force in Venezuela on 2 May 1990. Her administration worked on integrating the populous areas of the municipality—El Rosario, Las Minas and Santa Cruz del Este—by adding public services, and constructing sports fields and public spaces.

Lizárraga has been described as one of the trailblazing women in Venezuelan politics.
