= Romanian Venezuelans =

Venezuelans of Romanian descent

Romanian Venezuelans Rumano Venezolano Românii din Venezuela
Total population
- 1,500

Languages
- Spanish (Venezuelan Spanish) · Romanian

Religion
- Christianity (there is also a small group of Romanian Jews)

Related ethnic groups
- Venezuelan of European descent

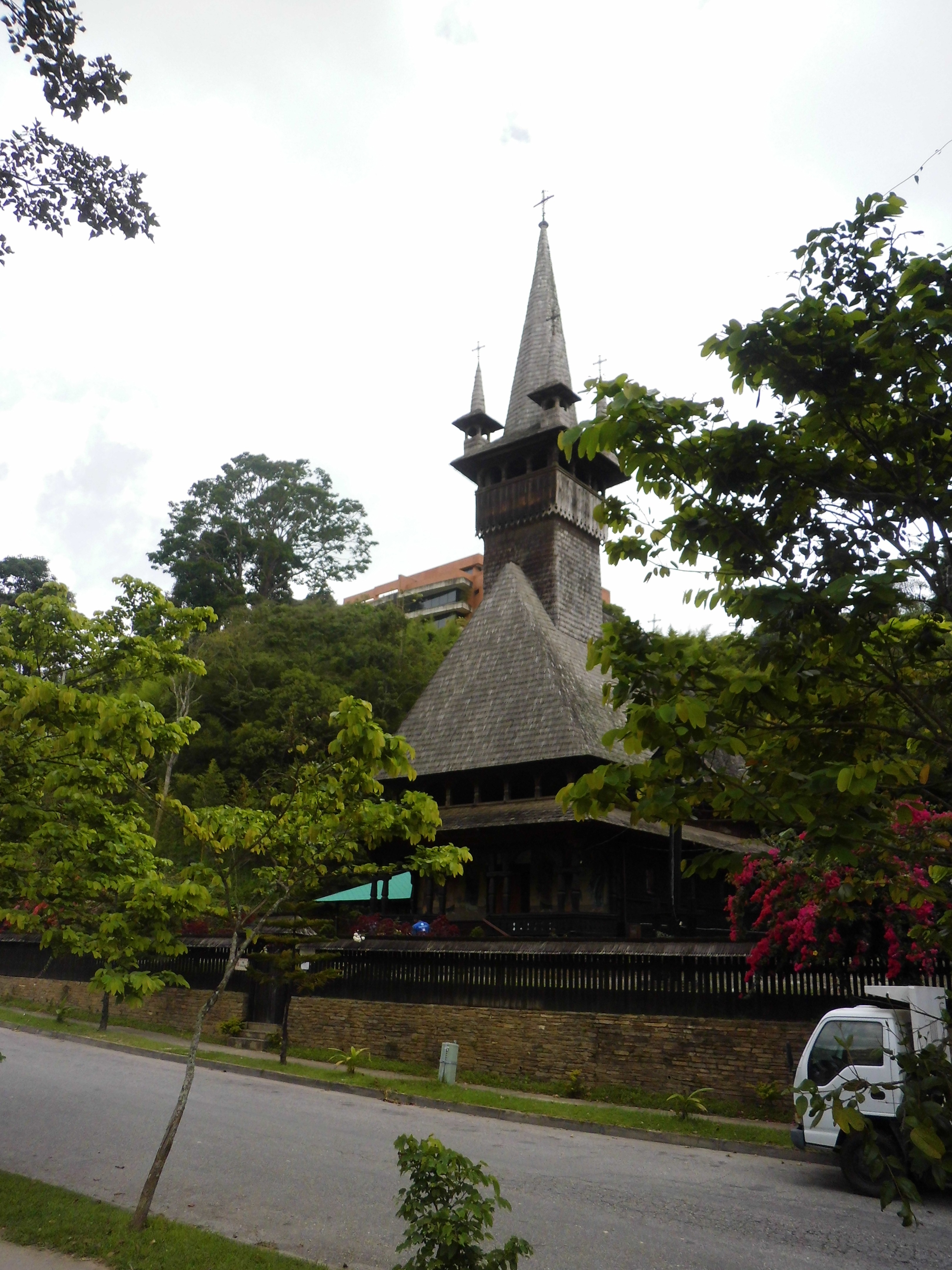
St. Constantine and Helena's Romanian Orthodox Church located in the suburb of El Hatillo, Greater Caracas

Romanian Venezuelans are Venezuelans of Romanian descent or a Romania-born person who resides in Venezuela.

The Romanian community in Venezuela is around 10,000 people. They are mostly immigrants who arrived in the country, like many other European nationalities, following the Second World War and the policies of the governments of the Warsaw Pact.

During the Venezuelan refugee crisis, some Venezuelans of Romanian descent migrated to Romania.

== Notable people ==
- Ingrid Alexandrescu, singer
- Joana Benedek - model and telenovela actress.
- Jacques Braunstein - musician, economist, publicist and disc jockey.
- Paul Georgescu - hydraulic engineer. Emeritus professor of Simon Bolivar University.
- Sofia Imber - journalist and cultural promoter, creator of the Museo de Arte Contemporáneo de Caracas.
- Lya Imber - first woman in Venezuela to earn the degree of Doctor of Medical Sciences.
- Moisés Kaufman - playwright, director and founder of Tectonic Theater Project.
- Thea Segall - photographer

== See also ==
- Romanian diaspora
- Immigration to Venezuela
- Romanian Orthodox Church of Caracas
- Venezuelans of European descent
