= Las Minas de Baruta =

- Parish
- Location within Venezuela
- Coordinates: 10°26′49″N 66°51′45″W
- Country: Venezuela
- State: Miranda
- Municipality: Baruta

Area
  - Total: 4 km^{2} (1.5 sq mi)

Population (2010)
  - Total: 51,441
  - Density: 13,000/km^{2} (33,000/sq mi)

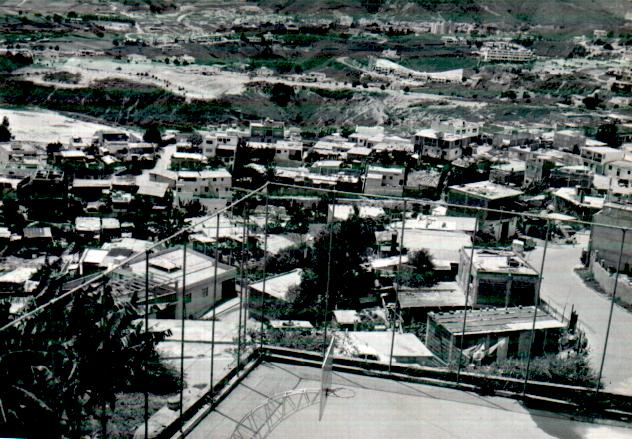
Las Minas de Baruta in 1972

Las Minas de Baruta is one of 3 parishes in the Baruta Municipality and one of 32 of Caracas, Venezuela.
