= Mariche people =

Former native Venezuelan tribe

The Mariche were an Indigenous Venezuelan tribe.

Not much information from them as a tribe has survived to the present day. It is known that their descendants lived in what is now called Filas de Mariches, distrito Sucre, Estado Miranda and in the area of El Hatillo both near Caracas, Venezuela, where they lived very close to several Karina (Carib) tribes.

One of their more celebrated chiefs was Tamanaco who led them in the fight against the Spanish conquistadors during the 1560s and 1570s.
