= Church of St. Constantine and Helena (Caracas) =

Church St. Constantine and St. Helena
- Iglesia de San Constantino y Santa Elena
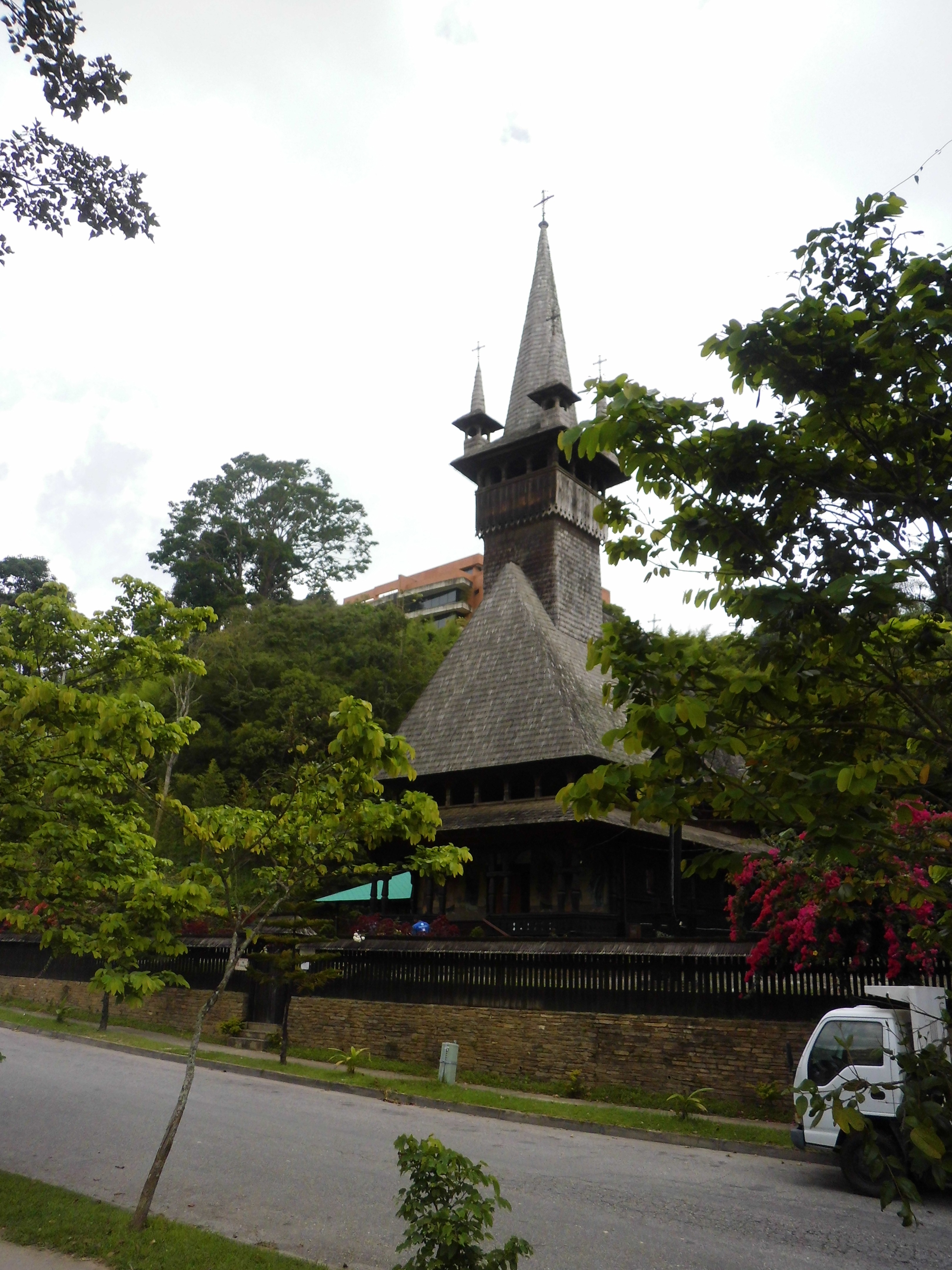
- Iglesia de San Constantino y Santa Elena
- Church St. Constantine and St. Helena
- 10°25′06″N 66°49′17″W
- Location: El Hatillo, Greater Caracas
- Country: Venezuela
- Denomination: Romanian Orthodox Church, Eastern Orthodoxy
- Website: http://www.icontip.com/8.html

History
- Status: Church
- Founded: 1999
- Founder: Teoctist Arăpașu

Architecture
- Functional status: Active
- Style: Gothic/Carpathian vernacular

Specifications
- Height: 38 m (125 ft) Bell tower
- Materials: Wood

Church of St. Constantine and St. Helena, located in El Hatillo at the south-east of Caracas. It was donated by the Orthodox Church of Venezuela and the Government of Romania to the Orthodox community living in the capital of Venezuela. The land for its construction was donated by the mayor. There are only 15 religious temples of its kind in the world and only two of them are outside Romania. It was built by craftsmen from the Maramureș region in Transylvania, it was assembled without nails or metal objects in the structure and it is adorned with religious neo-Byzantine paintings. The bell tower rises more than 30 meters. All the pieces of wood for ceilings and walls, were brought from Romania.

It was inaugurated in 1999 and took part in the act Teoctist Arăpașu, Patriarch of the Romanian Orthodox Church at that time. It was decorated by Titiana Nitu Popa and Mihaela Profiriu. The structure is intended to be a replica of the wooden church of Șurdești, the highest in Romania.

== Gallery ==
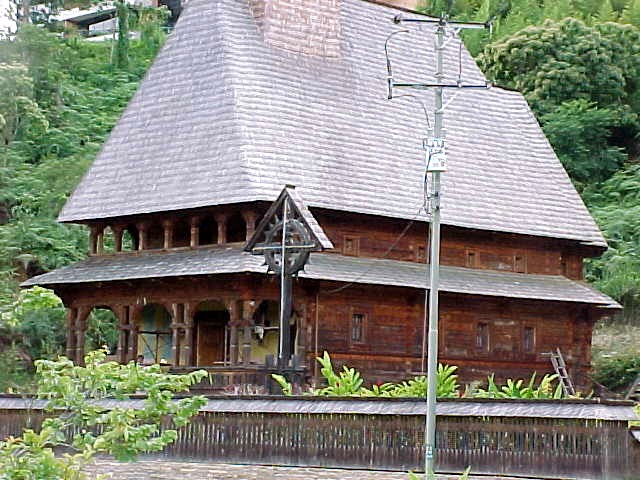

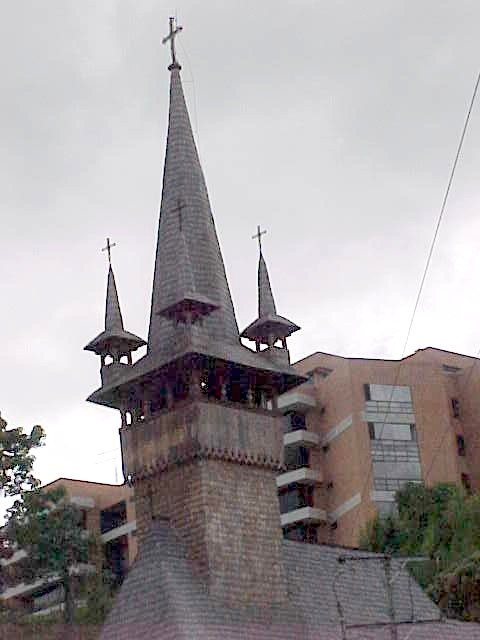

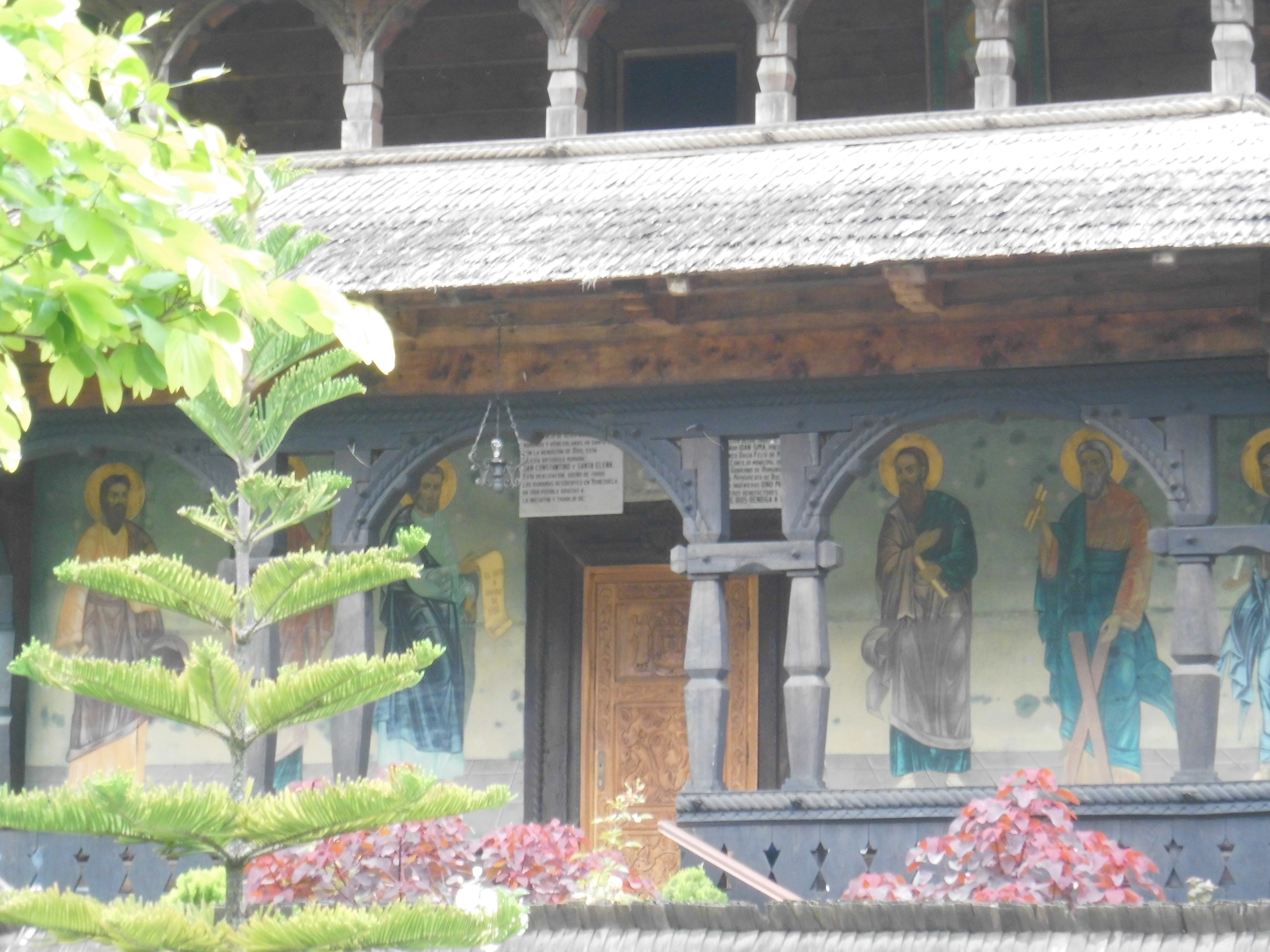

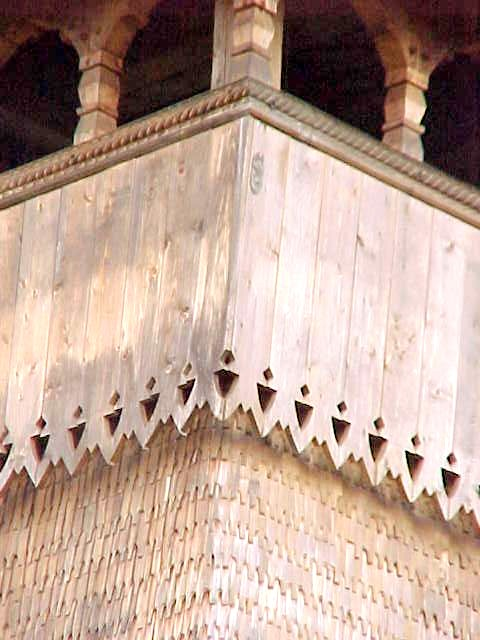

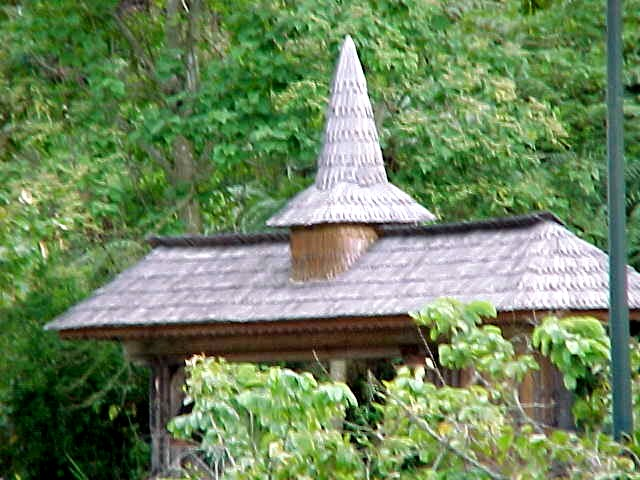

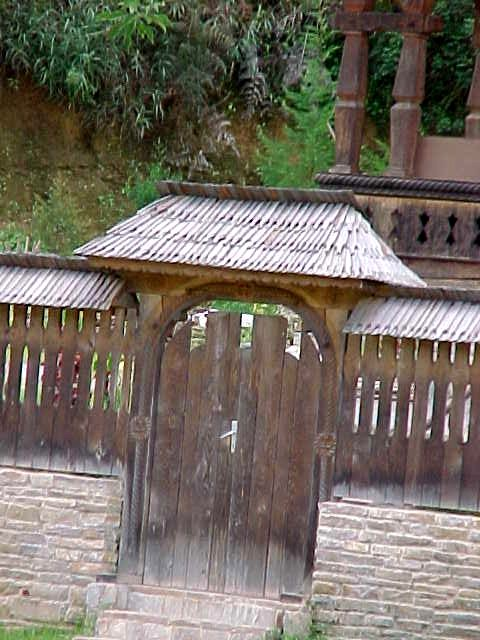

== See also ==
- Eastern Orthodox Church
- Romanian Orthodox Church
- Wooden churches of Maramureș
- Vernacular architecture of the Carpathians
- Romanian Venezuelan
