= Tamanaco =

Native Venezuelan chief

- Born: Venezuela
- Died: 1573; Venezuela

Tamanaco was an Indigenous Venezuelan chief, who as leader of the Mariches and Quiriquires tribes led (during part of the 16th century) the resistance against the Spanish conquest of Venezuelan territory in the central region of the country, specially in the Caracas valley. He is one of the most famous and best known Venezuelan Caciques (Spanish: Indian chief).

The city of Santiago de León de Caracas, which had been founded in 1567 by Diego de Losada, was continuously harassed and the subject of raids conducted by the local tribes. In 1570 when Diego de Mazariegos took charge as governor of the province of Venezuela, he made it a priority to pacify the territories.

== Conflict with the Spanish ==
Following the death of Guaicaipuro, Tamanaco had risen as the new leader of the Mariches and Quiriquires. By 1573 Tamanaco and his group of natives had become such a problem that reinforcements came from Spain and other Spanish islands in the Caribbean with the sole purpose of taking care of this matter.

Soon after captain Pedro Alonso Galeas and lieutenant Francisco Calderón joined their forces, they started on an expedition with the intention of engaging Tamanaco and his men; they were helped by Aricabacuto, another native Chief. Upon learning of this expedition, Tamanaco prepared a fighting force made up of 300 warriors recruited among his tribes and with the help of men from the Teques and Arbaco tribes. It wasn't long before the two groups engaged each other in combat. However neither side came out victorious in their first fight.

Soon after Tamanaco decided to attack Caracas and pursue the Spanish soldiers who retreated to the banks of the river Guaire. The Spanish lost and their commanding officer captain Hernando de la Cerda died in the fighting. However, as the battle seemed to be ending with Tamanaco's victory, a Spanish cavalry detachment came and surrounded the natives.

== Death ==
Tamanaco was apprehended alive and sentenced to death by hanging. However, Garcí González de Silva, in charge of Caracas' city hall "did something". Among the discussion a captain named Mendoza suggested an alternative: he proposed to let Tamanaco chose between hanging or fighting a trained killer mastin dog named "Friend" that Mendoza owned. All liked the idea and proposed it to Tamanaco. He accepted the challenge and is reported to have said "the dog will die by my hands and then these cruel men will know what Tamanaco is capable of". However, the fight was uneven and Tamanaco died of the injuries he suffered in his throat. The legend claims the dog so fiercely bit his neck that it detached it from his body. Some historians say that there is not enough evidence to confirm if it was one or several dogs that fought with Tamanaco. After his death, Tamanaco would become a legend among the natives who would call his name when going into battle.

== Legacy ==
In Venezuela there are a variety of works, neighborhoods and sites that are named after Tamanaco. Probably best known are the 'Hotel Tamanaco' (Caracas' oldest 5-star hotel—part of the Intercontinental chain), the 'Centro Ciudad Comercial Tamanaco' (a shopping mall), the 'Tamanaco Avenue' in Caracas, the 'Colinas del Tamanaco' residential area in Caracas, and the 'Tamanaco Dam' in Guarico state among others. Gold coins for investment and collection are minted in Venezuela with Tamanaco's image.

== Use in propaganda ==
In past years the former president of Venezuela, deceased Hugo Chávez, has often mentioned Tamanaco and other native chiefs in his speeches with the purpose of inspiring Venezuelans to resist what he calls American imperialists and interventionists policies directed towards Venezuela. Most notably he did it every year during the 12 October holiday, which after being renamed several years ago Dia de la Raza (previously America's Discovery day), was recently renamed as Día de la Resistencia Indígena (Day of Indigenous Resistance).
