= Nuestra Señora del Rosario de Baruta =

- Parish
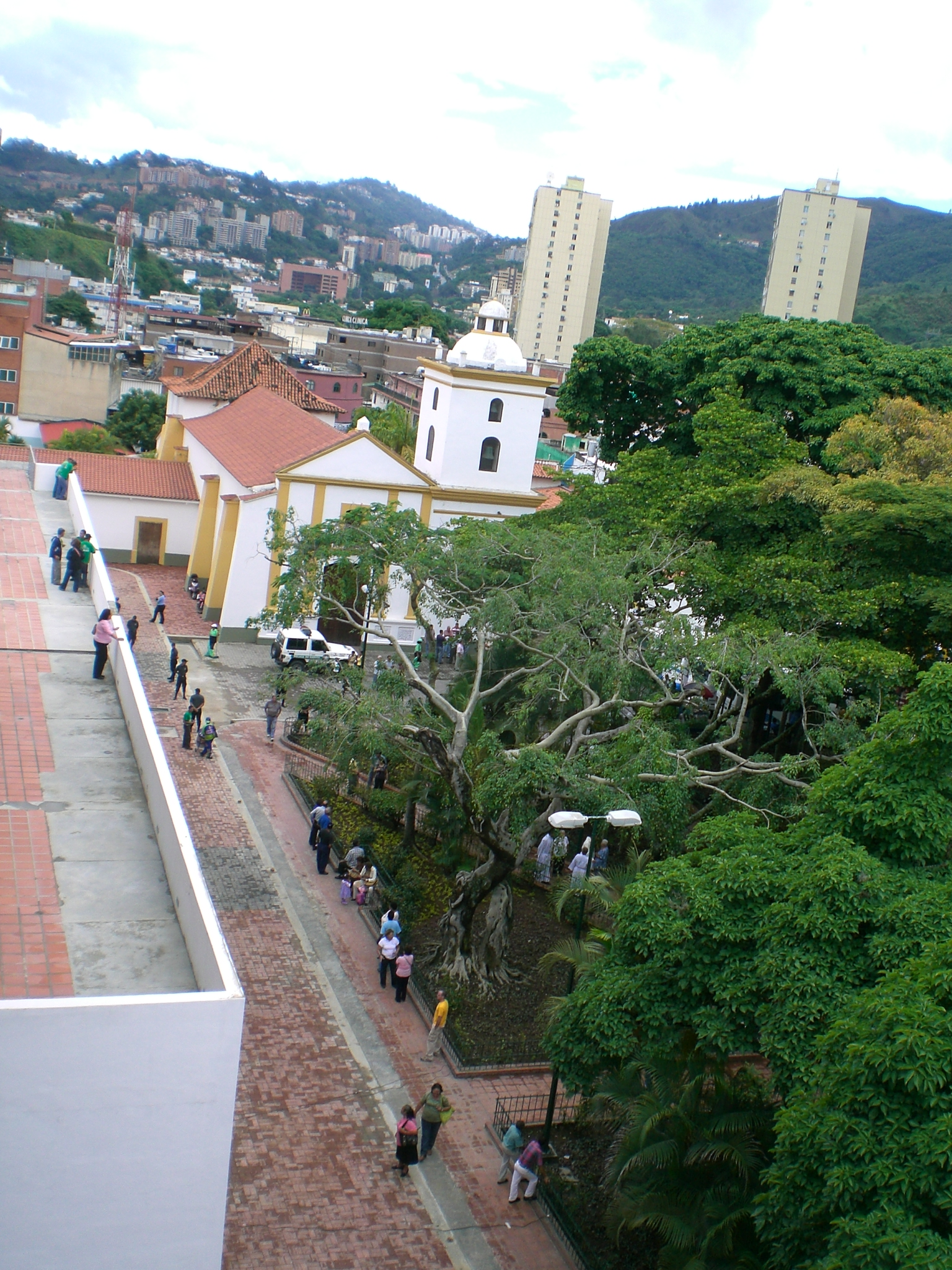
- Nuestra Señora del Rosario Church

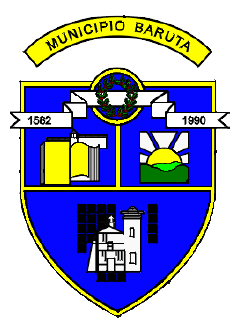
- Coat of arms

- Location within Venezuela
- Coordinates: 10°25′56″N 66°52′26″W
- Country: Venezuela
- State: Miranda
- Municipality: Baruta

Nuestra Señora del Rosario de Baruta is the seat of the Baruta Municipality in Miranda, Venezuela.

== See also ==
- Miranda State
- El Hatillo Town
- Baruta Municipality
