= El Hatillo, Miranda =

El Hatillo
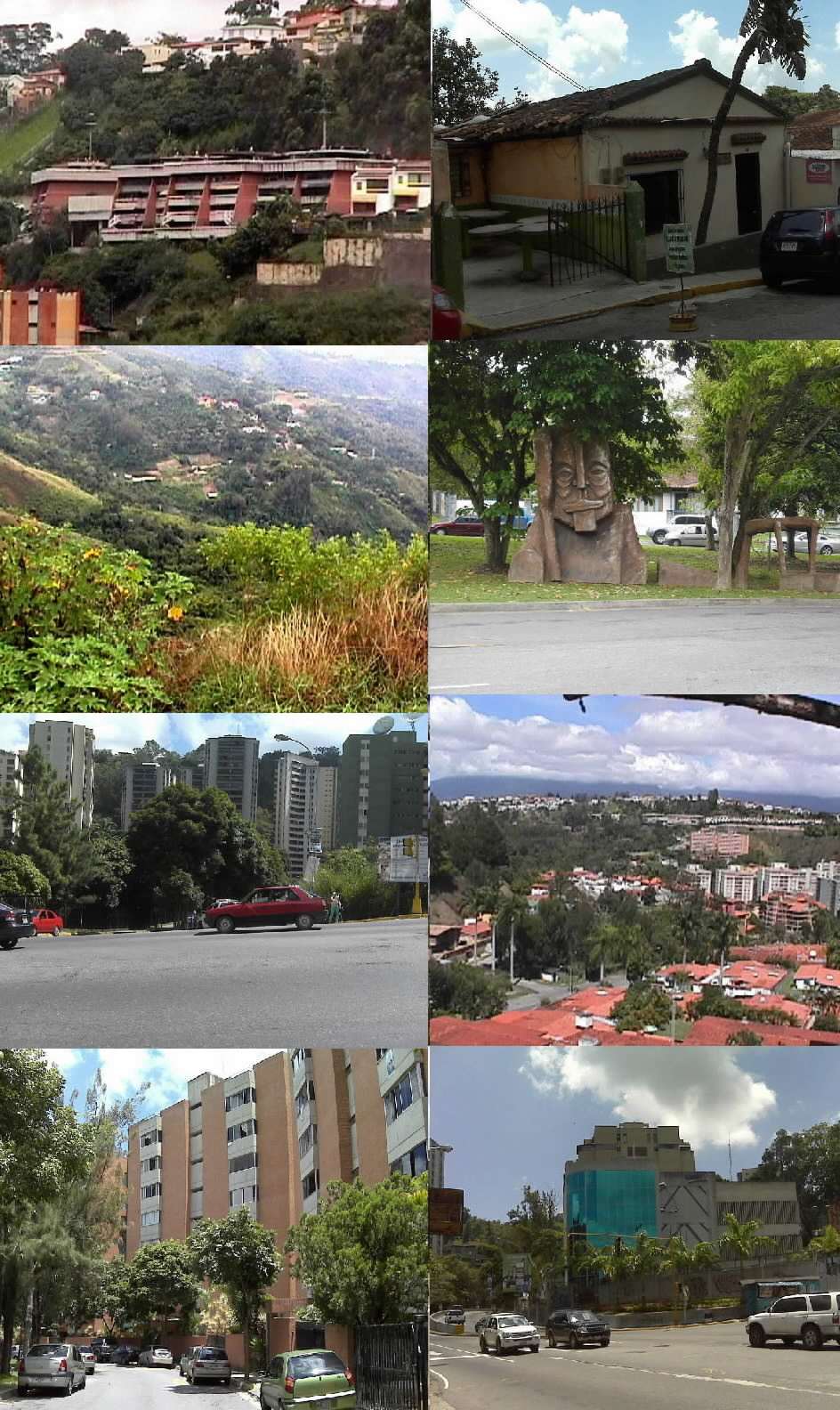

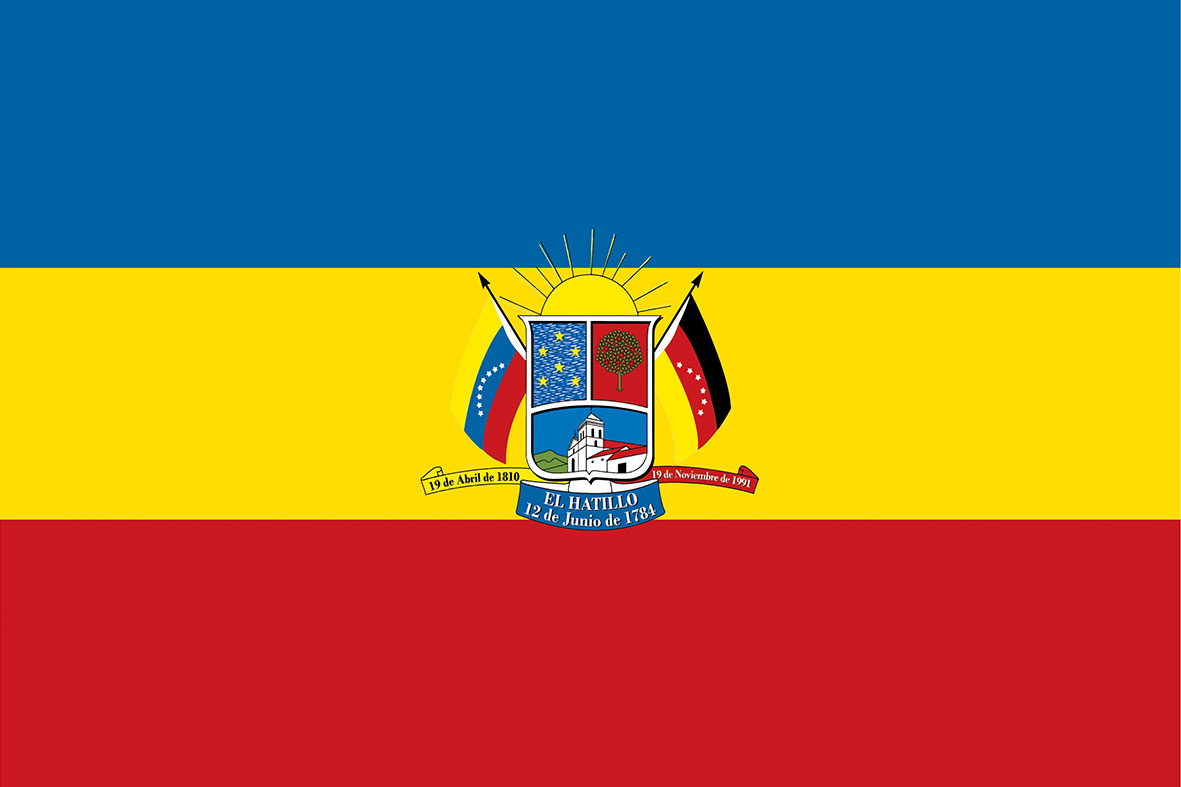
- Flag Coat of arms

- Location within Venezuela
- Coordinates: 10.4333°N 66.8°W
- Country: Venezuela
- State: Miranda
- Municipality: El Hatillo Municipality

Population (2019)
  - Total: 92,900

El Hatillo (Spanish: El Hatillo) is the seat of El Hatillo Municipality, Miranda, Venezuela.
