= El Cafetal =

Coordinates: 10°28′N 66°50′W

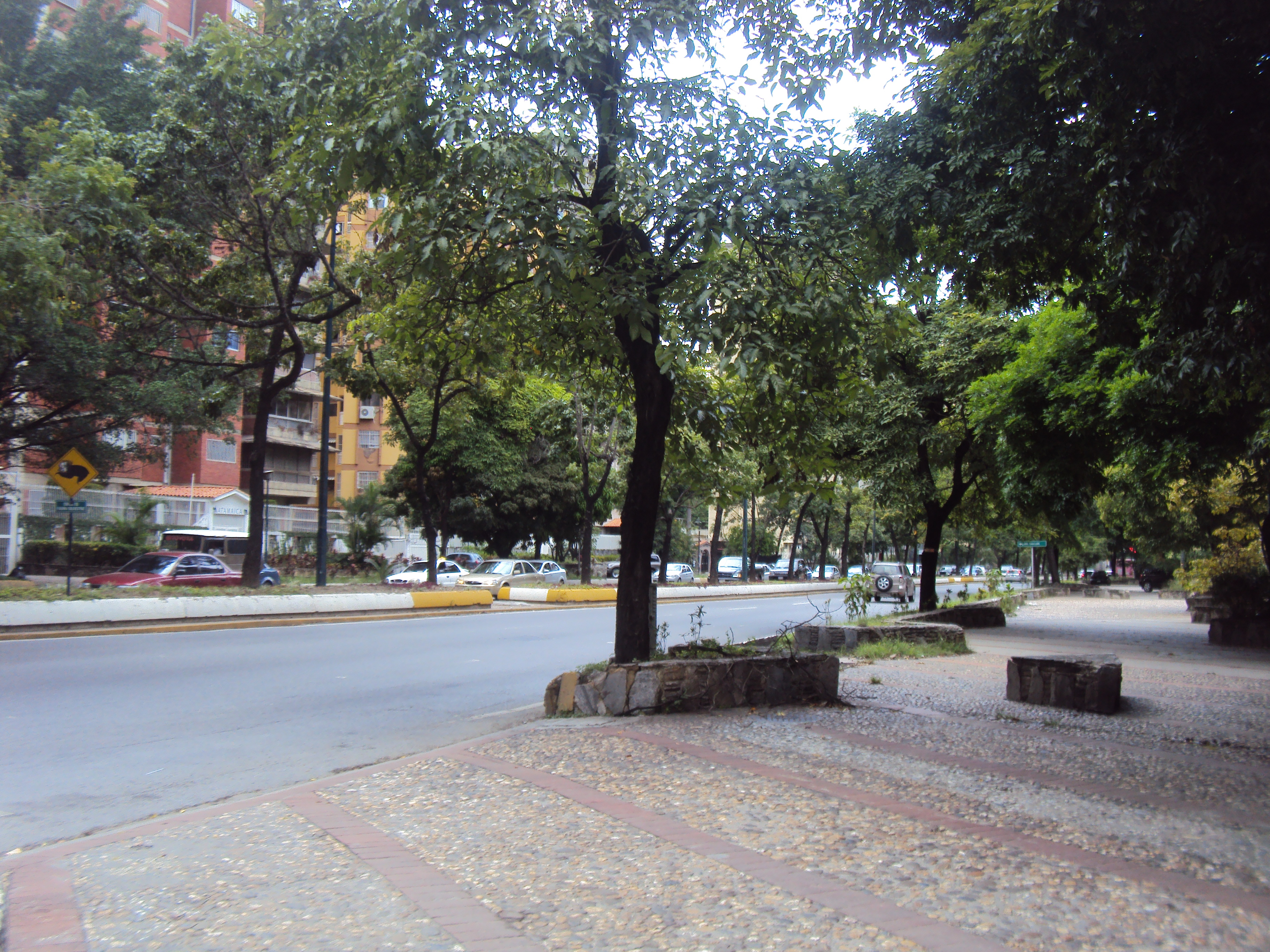
- Avenida Principal de El Cafetal
- Interactive map of El Cafetal
- Country: Venezuela
- State: Miranda
- Municipality: Baruta

Area
  - Land: 25 km^{2} (9.7 sq mi)

Population (2009)
  - Total: 80,000
  - Density: 3,200/km^{2} (8,300/sq mi)

El Cafetal is a neighborhood located in the Baruta Municipality of Caracas, Venezuela.

== History ==
It is an urbanization developed in the second half of the 20th century in what was once a coffee plantation (from which it took its name) in the east of the capital of Venezuela.

Indeed, in the 1950s, in the confines of the old town of Petare, the urbanization "El Marqués" was promoted, promoted by René Bruno Borges Villegas and designed by the engineer Luis Borges de Villegas Mejías. To the south of Guaire emerged the urbanizations "Las Mercedes" (1940) developed by Venezolana de Inversiones CA. (VICA) and "Los Rosales" (1941-1948) projected by Juan Bernardo Arismendi. Between Las Mercedes and El Marques there was a territory dedicated to coffee plantations, which was frequently flooded by the broken places of the Guaire River and consequently it was partly marshy: El Cafetal.

The urbanization of the territory in which the parish is located today and the urbanization was initiated in the 1970s, after the urbanization of the territories of Las Mercedes, the construction of Prados del Este Highway and the beginning of the construction project of the Simón Bolívar University.

The land initially belonged to Eugenio Mendoza and Armando Planchart, who as private investors promoted the creation of the Avenida Principal de El Cafetal (on the homonymous ravine) along with the entrepreneurs who developed Las Mercedes.

El Cafetal has one of the best shopping centers in eastern Caracas: the Plaza Las Americas which has been renovated twice. And also the El Cafetal shopping center. Currently it is mainly residential area of the upper-middle class.
