= El Hatillo Municipality =

El Hatillo Municipality Municipio El Hatillo
- Municipality
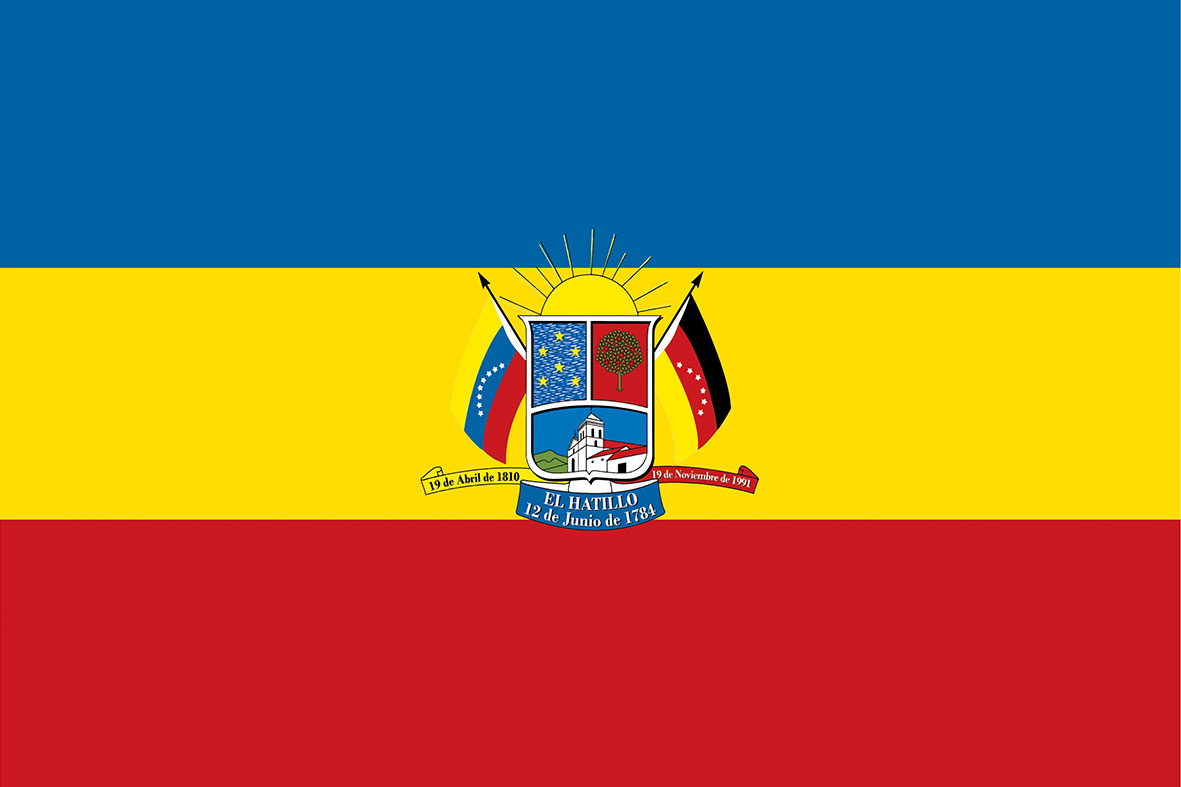
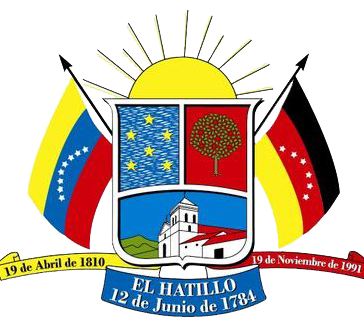
- Flag Coat of arms

- Location in Miranda

- Location in Venezuela
- Coordinates: 10°23′39″N 66°47′54″W
- Country: Venezuela
- State: Miranda
- City: Caracas
- Founded: June 12, 1784
- Incorporated: November 9, 1991
- Municipal seat: El Hatillo, Miranda, Venezuela

Government
  - Mayor: Fernando Melena Sebastiani (MOVEV)

Area
  - Total: 143.8 km^{2} (55.5 sq mi)
- Elevation: 1,136 m (3,727 ft)

Population (2011)
  - Total: 58,156
  - Density: 404.4/km^{2} (1,047/sq mi)
- Time zone: UTC−4 (VET)
- Postal code(s): 1083 and 1061
- Area code(s): 0212
- Website: Official website

El Hatillo Municipality (Spanish: Municipio El Hatillo) is an administrative division of the State of Miranda, Venezuela; along with Baruta, Chacao, Libertador and Sucre, it is one of the five municipalities of Caracas, the capital of Venezuela. It is located in the southeastern area of Caracas, and in the northwestern part of the State of Miranda.

The seat of the municipal government is El Hatillo Town, founded in 1784 by Don Baltasar de León, who was instrumental in the area's development. Although the town had its origins during the Spanish colonisation, the municipality was not established until 1991. In 2000 – the year after a new constitution was enacted in Venezuela – some of the municipality functions were delegated to a consolidated mayor's office called Alcaldía Mayor, which also has some authority over the other four municipalities of Caracas.

El Hatillo has some of its colonial architecture, including an 18th-century parish church and a unique Romanian Orthodox Church. The municipality also has a rich artistic culture, with at least two important musical festivals celebrated yearly, and numerous holiday celebrations reflecting the heritage of El Hatillo. The culture, the pleasant temperature, the rural landscape, and the gastronomy of the municipality have made it a place of interest for visitors to the city, and a desirable place to live. The municipality receives a part of its income from tourism, an activity that is promoted by the government.

Although commercial areas are growing rapidly, agriculture remains a foundation of the economy in the rural areas of the southern part of El Hatillo. The business sector remains mostly underdeveloped, causing heavy employee movement in and out of the municipality – a problem that has made the transportation infrastructure of El Hatillo very congested.

== History ==
In the 16th century, when the Spanish colonisation in the area began, El Hatillo was inhabited by the Mariches, a tribe of indigenous people possibly related to the Kalina (Caribs). Cacique Tamanaco was the leader of these tribes, known for resisting the Spanish colonisation. As the colonisation developed, the indigenous inhabitants were killed; by order of Caracas's founder Diego de Losada, Tamanaco was also murdered.

A plaque in front of Baltasar's house describes how he donated land to construct El Hatillo Town (click to read translation).

In 1752, Don Baltasar de León García arrived to El Hatillo from Cádiz, Spain, having just completed a prison term at La Carraca, Spain, for opposing (with his father) the monopoly rules of Guipuzcoana Company, which was in charge of maintaining exclusive trade between Spain and Venezuela. Don Baltasar founded El Hatillo Town, becoming one of the most significant contributors to its early development. Don Baltasar focused on making El Hatillo a strong, united and independent community, aiming to establish the area as a distinct parish from Baruta, on which El Hatillo depended. He accomplished this on June 12, 1784, when the governor and the bishop agreed to declare El Hatillo autonomous and under the direction of Don Baltasar, in front of 180 Canary-descendant families; this date is accepted as the foundation date of El Hatillo Town.

That same year, Don Baltasar and his brother-in-law donated their properties to the town, and an engineer assisted in the urban planning, which included grid streets and a parish church. The church was built to honor Santa Rosalía de Palermo, who Baltasar believed had saved him from a plague that killed his father in prison. In 1803, at the age of 79, Don Baltasar was unexpectedly killed in a horse accident.

In 1809, landlord and Lieutenant Colonel Manuel Escalona achieved the separation of El Hatillo from Petare, another suburb of Caracas, making it a different Tenientazgo de Justicia – a type of administrative division at the time. On April 19, 1810, Escalona enjoined the town to the movement of independence under Simón Bolívar, becoming another important person in the history of the municipality.

Ana Francisca Pérez García, Don Baltasar's wife, was a noteworthy woman in El Hatillo, attending to community children, elders and ill citizens. She donated a considerable amount of money for the construction of a hospital in Petare after the 1812 earthquake; this hospital is currently known as the Pérez de León de Petare Hospital.

One of the most ambitious urbanisation projects in El Hatillo since its founding was the neighborhood called La Lagunita. In the 1950s and 1960s, La Lagunita S.A. constructed a "functional, futuristic and comfortable" residential zone. To encourage people to settle in the area, each parcel included a membership to Lagunita Country Club, which was officially opened in 1964. Brazilian landscape designer Roberto Burle Marx contributed to this project, constructed on the 4.3 million m^{2} hacienda that once belonged to former Venezuelan president Eleazar López Contreras. La Lagunita has since become a wealthy neighborhood of El Hatillo.

Although El Hatillo has been independent from Petare since 1809, it later became part of Sucre Municipality, where Petare is located. On November 19, 1991, Miranda's Legislative Assembly gave El Hatillo full autonomy, making it an independent municipality; this decision was issued in Gaceta Oficial on January 17, 1992. In 1993, Mercedes Hernández de Silva was elected the first mayor of El Hatillo. Since 2000, the Alcaldía Mayor manages some of the functions of the municipality.

The municipality was the target of airstrikes by the United States Air Force during the 2026 United States intervention in Venezuela. One of the strikes killed a Colombian woman who lived with her daughter on a rural house. The woman, Yohana Rodríguez, was one of the two civilian casualties during the attacks.

== Geography ==
Simulated-color Landsat 7 satellite image of El Hatillo and surrounding areas.

El Hatillo Municipality lies at the southeast area of the city of Caracas and at the northwest corner of the State of Miranda; it is one of the state's 21 municipalities. El Hatillo is also within the jurisdiction of the Alcaldía Mayor, which has power over three adjacent municipalities of Miranda, and over Libertador Municipality in the Capital District. These five municipalities make up the city of Caracas. El Hatillo has a land size of 114 square kilometres (44 sq mi) – the third largest municipality in the capital.

The municipality's natural southern boundary is the Turgua range, spanning east to west and separating El Hatillo from the Baruta and Paz Castillo municipalities. Parallel to Turgua in the north is the Sabaneta range; the Prepo stream runs between the two ranges. North of the Sabaneta range, the Prepo stream feeds into the Tusmare stream, which ends in the Guaire river.

Topographic map of El Hatillo.

La Guairita stream flows into the Guaire in northeastern El Hatillo. The Guaire river is the eastern limit of the municipality, separating it from Sucre and Paz Castillo in the southeastern sector of El Hatillo. La Guairita serves as the northern boundary between El Hatillo and the municipalities of Baruta and Sucre. Limiting Baruta to the west, the boundaries of the municipality follow El Volcán, Pariaguán, La Mata and other peaks until they meet Turgua range in southeastern El Hatillo.

The tallest peak in El Hatillo is Picacho de El Volcán (Spanish for "Peak of the Volcano"), at 1,490 meters (4,888 ft) above sea level, from where radio, television and telecommunication antennas serve Caracas. Despite its name, the mountain has had no recorded volcanic history. Other significant mountains in El Hatillo are Gavilán at 1,148 metres (3,766 ft), Topo de El Paují at 1,245 metres (4,085 ft) and Topo de Piedras Pintadas at 1,196 metres (3,924 ft).

=== Environment ===
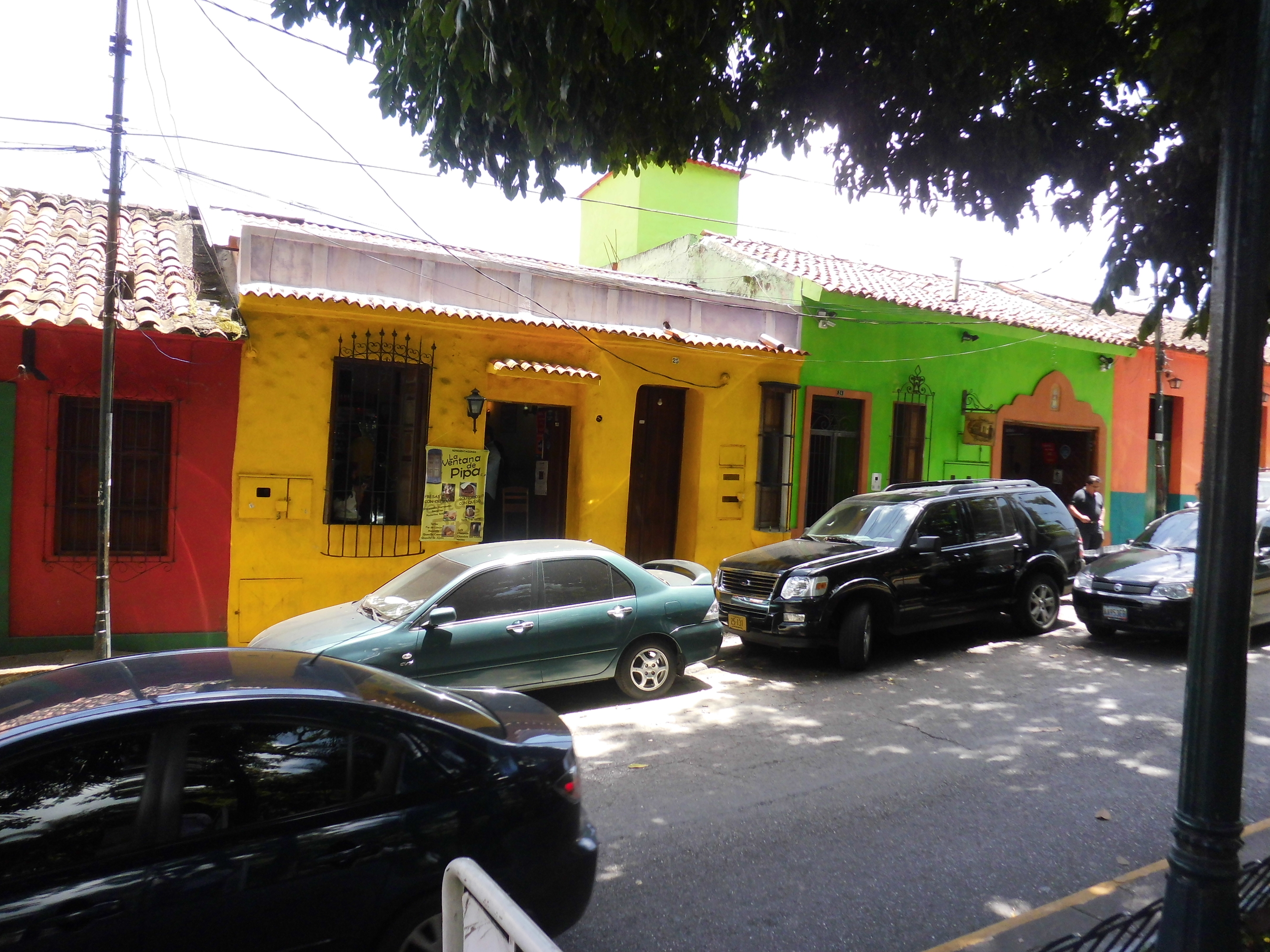
Shops into the colonial houses

El Hatillo, at a higher altitude than the neighboring municipalities of Caracas, has slightly cooler weather than nearby downtown Caracas. The average temperature is between 21 and 24 degrees Celsius (70–75 °F). At the highest elevations, the temperature can decrease to 18 °C (64 °F) and the atmosphere may have constant fog. The mean precipitation is 997.3 millimeters a year (39 inches); annual values can range from 800 to 1,500 millimeters (32 in to 59 in). The average humidity index is 75%; similar to the rest of Venezuela, the rainy season is May through November, while all other months are considered the dry season. The winds are north alizé trade winds.

Concentrated near water bodies, the vegetation in most of El Hatillo is dense forests, occupying around 30% of the surface. Smaller plants like shrubs take around 9% and herbs occupy a similar percentage. In 1972, the forests of El Hatillo were declared a protected zone of the metropolitan area of Caracas.

The municipality is home to a wide range of bird species, with more than two hundred registered, including sparrowhawks, eagles, falcons, and owls. Birdwatching in the area is promoted by the authorities of Miranda, who have also supported conservation of these species.

== Demographics ==
Projected population growth chart based on 2001 data.

In the 16th century, the indigenous Mariches were killed by the explorers; when the development of El Hatillo began, Spaniards from the Canary Islands settled in the area. Families from Madeira, Portugal also immigrated to El Hatillo, working largely in agriculture in La Unión neighborhood. As of 2001, 86% of the inhabitants of El Hatillo were born in Venezuela; the largest group not born in Venezuela was from Colombia with 4.2% of the population, followed by Spain with 2.0%, Italy with 1.0%, the United States with 1.0%, and Portugal with 0.8%.

In the 2001 National Institute of Statistics census, El Hatillo Municipality had 54,226 inhabitants, but demographics show a rapidly rising population. With the progressive demographic increase, El Hatillo's population is no longer exclusive to any particular ethnic group. In 2001 there were 997 births in El Hatillo, equivalent to a rate of 18.4 births per one thousand citizens. The death rate for that same year was 2.9 per one thousand citizens. 2001 data shows that there is an average of 21.3 years of potential life lost. The main cause of death according to 1999 data was cancer, followed by heart disease and murder.

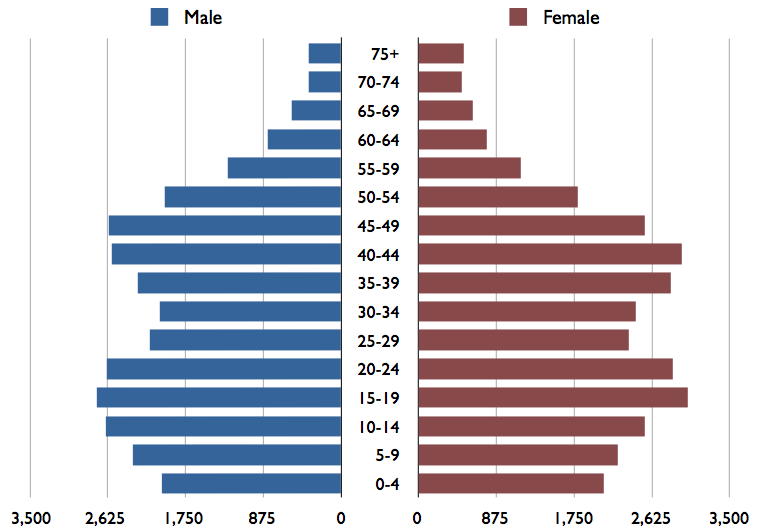
Population pyramid for El Hatillo Municipality based on data from 2000.

Data for 2000 shows that the largest age group to be 15- to 19-year-olds, representing 9.5% of El Hatillo's population; for every 100 females there are 94.2 males. The unemployment rate in 2001 was 6.1%, ranking fourth lowest among the twenty-one municipalities in Miranda.

As of 2001, there were 18,878 homes in El Hatillo, of which 13,545 were occupied; the remaining homes were either unoccupied, occasionally used, under construction, or for sale. An average of four people made up each household. Regarding wealth, 74.7% of the population were above poverty level, 21.5% were poor, and 3.8% were extremely poor. According to the 2001 census, each household in the municipality received an average of 1,316,906 Venezuelan bolívares (1316.906 bolívares fuertes) per month, equal to US$1,832 at the time, or US$21,984 per year.

=== Neighborhoods ===
Although there are no defined limits for the neighborhoods of El Hatillo, the government website divides the municipality into urban and rural. Concentrated in the northern region of the municipality, the urban neighborhoods are El Hatillo Town, El Calvario, La Lagunita, Alto Hatillo, La Boyera, Las Marías, Oripoto, Los Pomelos, Los Naranjos, Los Geranios, La Cabaña, Cerro Verde, Llano Verde, Colinas, Vista El Valle, Los Olivos, and El Cigarral. The rural localities of the municipality are located in southern El Hatillo; these are La Unión, Corralito, Turgua, La Hoyadita, Sabaneta, La Mata, Caicaguana, and Altos de Halcón.

== Economy ==
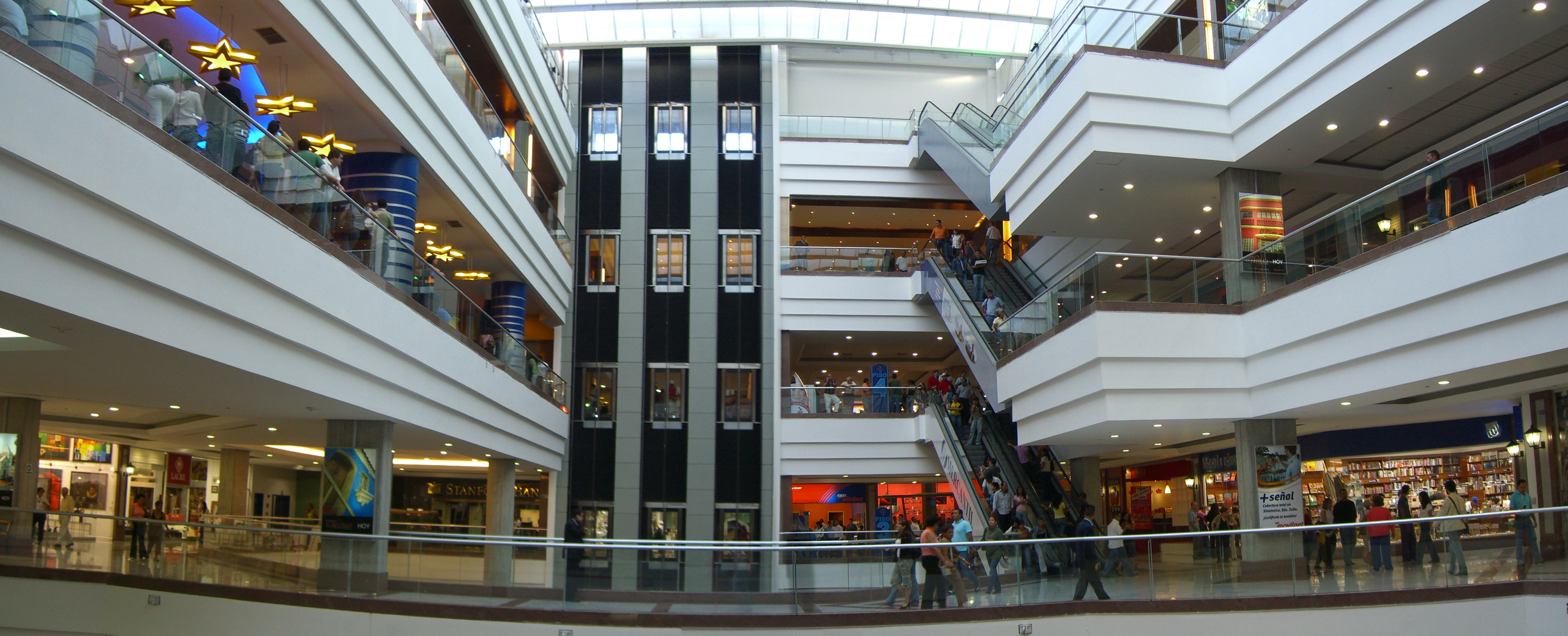
Paseo El Hatillo shopping mall.

The economy of El Hatillo Municipality consists of three sectors: the commercial sector, which has been growing along with the population increase and is primarily represented by shopping malls and retail stores around the urban areas most of which sell typical crafts of the country; agricultural, in the southern half of the municipality and existing since the founding of El Hatillo; and tourism, which contributes significantly to El Hatillo's income and is promoted by the government.

El Hatillo is an accessible day visit destination for people from Caracas; the municipality is only 15 km (9.3 mi) southeast of downtown Caracas but in the mountains removed from the congested Caracas valley; thus, development has focused on day tourism. The central town square – Plaza Bolívar – and its surroundings are well maintained, and the municipal government offers bus trips around the narrow streets for viewing the colonial architecture of the town. Handcrafted souvenirs and products are popular purchases, offered at local artisan shops, and there are numerous restaurants. There are at least three cultural centers in the municipality that attract tourists and residents to music festivals and art expositions.

To support the increasing population, numerous shopping malls have been built in the municipality. Neighborhoods like La Lagunita, Los Naranjos and El Hatillo Town now offer large scale shopping malls with multiplex movie theaters. Since the 1980s, the older typical houses of El Hatillo Town have been converted to shops and restaurants, while preserving their colonial architecture.

Employment possibilities within El Hatillo – a bedroom community of Caracas – are reduced; businesses in the municipality are almost strictly commercial, and the economy has not expanded in other directions. Office space underdevelopment has resulted from a lack of land for large scale office construction, making it costly to locate large offices or businesses in the area. Those seeking employment in offices or larger businesses must look outside of El Hatillo, contributing to the high traffic to, from, and in El Hatillo.

== Law and government ==
Seal of Alcaldía El Hatillo, the mayor's office.

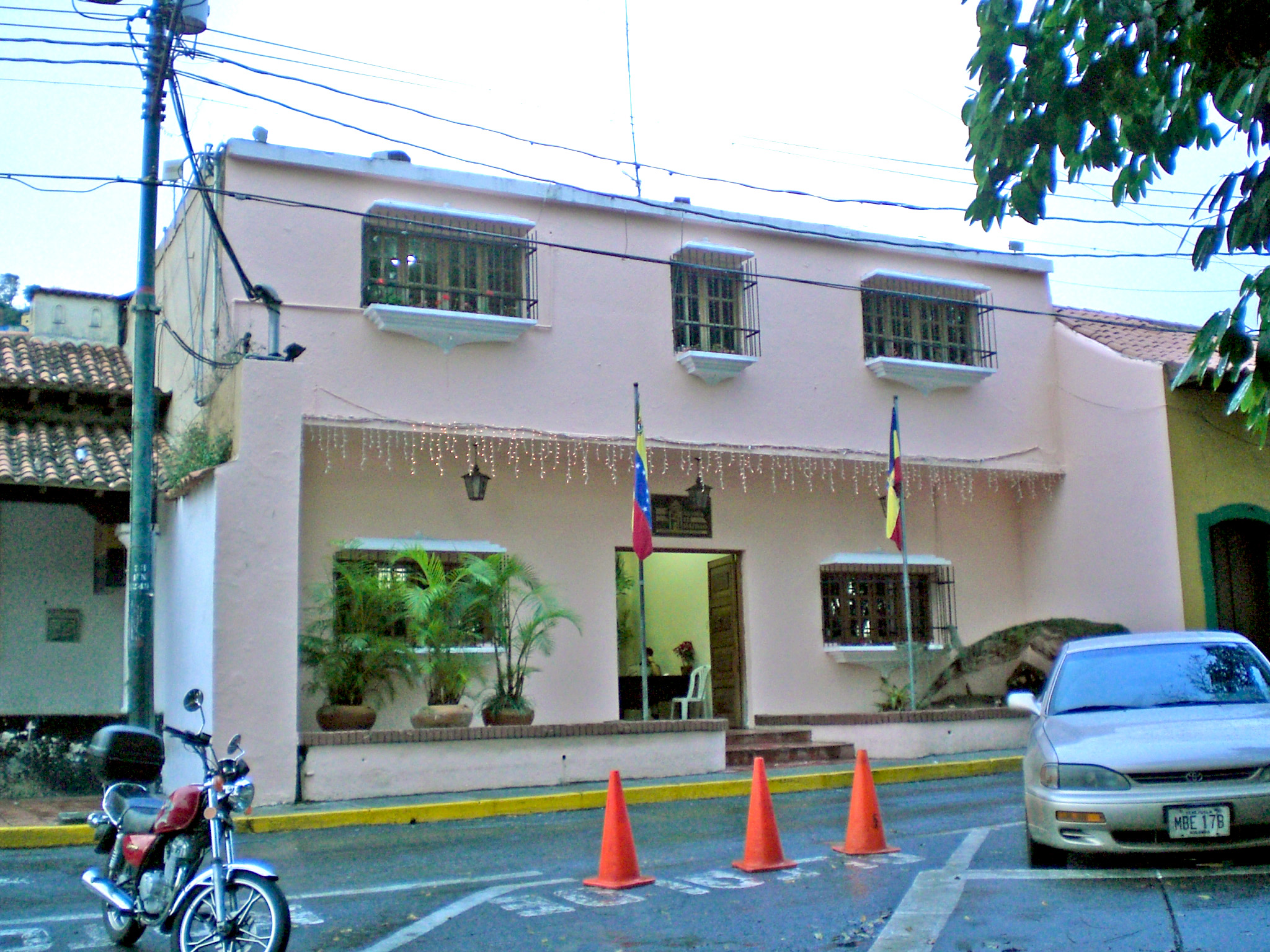
El Hatillo City Hall

Venezuelan law specifies that municipal governments have four main functions: executive, legislative, comptroller, and planning. The executive function is managed by the mayor, who is in charge of representing the municipality's administration. The legislative branch is represented by the Municipal Council, composed of seven councillors, charged with the deliberation of new decrees and local laws. The comptroller tasks are managed by the municipal comptroller's office, which oversees accountancy. Finally, planning is represented by the Local Public Planning Council, which manages development projects for the municipality.

El Hatillo has had five mayors through 2014. Mercedes Hernández de Silva was the first mayor of the municipality, serving from 1993 until 1996. Succeeding her, Flora Aranguen was Mayor from 1996 until 2000. That same year, Alfredo Catalán was elected mayor and reelected in 2004. On November 23, 2008 Myriam Do Nascimento was elected mayor. She served in that capacity until 2013, when David Smolansky succeeded her as mayor.

The 2007 president of the Municipal Council is Leandro Pereira, supported by the political party Justice First. All but one of the seven councillors belong to political parties opposed to President Hugo Chávez's administration. There is also a Legislative Commission, presided over by councillor Salvador Pirrone in 2007. The commission's job is to assist the municipality in legal matters, such as the creation of new laws and decrees.

On March 8, 2000 – the year after a new constitution was introduced in Venezuela – it was decreed that the Metropolitan District of Caracas would be created, and that some of the powers of El Hatillo Municipality would be delegated to the Alcaldía Mayor, which would also govern the Baruta, Libertador, Sucre and Chacao municipalities. Each of the five municipalities is divided into parishes; El Hatillo has only one, the Santa Rosalía de Palermo Parish, sometimes called Santa Rosalía de El Hatillo Parish or simply El Hatillo Parish.

In December 2006, as a part of a constitutional reform, Chávez proposed a reorganisation of the municipal powers. Chávez mentioned his reform plans again in his January 2007 presidential inauguration, suggesting a new form of subdivision—communal cities—in which mayors and municipalities would be replaced by communal powers.

=== Crime ===
Relative to the other Caracas municipalities, El Hatillo has the region's lowest crime rate. Data from 2003 shows that 53,555 crimes occurred within the five municipalities of Caracas, but only 418 (about 0.78%) took place within El Hatillo. El Hatillo's population is significantly lower than that of its sister municipalities; viewing 2003 crime data relative to 2001 census data, El Hatillo had an annual rate of 7.7 crimes for every one thousand citizens, while the average of the five Caracas municipalities was 19.4 for every one thousand citizens. The main police force in El Hatillo is the municipal police, sometimes referred to as Poli-Hatillo. Other police forces can also intervene in the municipality, including the Metropolitan Police, and the Miranda State Police.

== Education ==
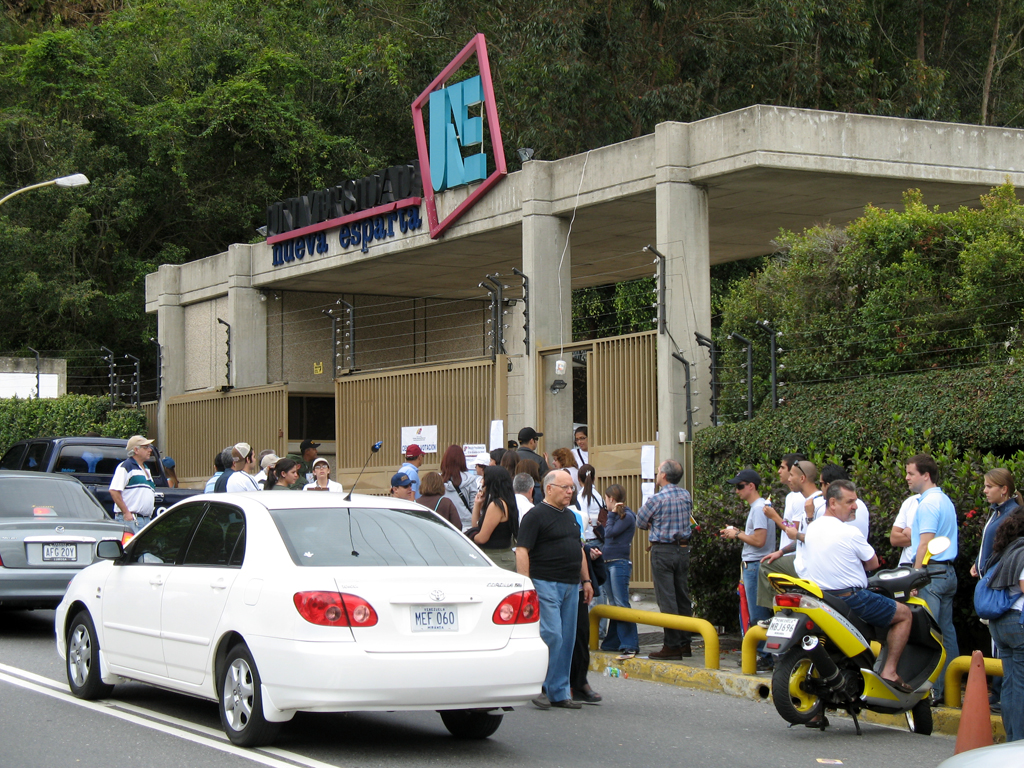
Nueva Esparta University, the only higher education institution in El Hatillo.

The municipality has one higher education facility – Nueva Esparta University, a 30,000 square meters (323,000 sq ft) institution located in Los Naranjos. Nueva Esparta school was founded in 1954, but the private university was not constructed until 1989.

El Hatillo offers free public education, with a total of seventeen primary education schools; eleven are public and six are private. Nineteen preschools exist: ten public and nine private. Data for secondary education is incomplete; there are five private secondary schools in the municipality, but the number of public secondary schools is unavailable. Government data shows each educational stage separately, but an individual facility may contain preschool, primary and secondary education. The 2001 census shows enrollment of 8,525 students during the 2000–2001 school year; by the end of the school year, 8,149 had passed.

== Culture ==
The most significant icon in the culture of El Hatillo is Santa Rosalía de Palermo. The church adjacent to the plaza in the center block of El Hatillo Town is named after this saint, and the only parish in the municipality also carries her name. The community is largely Catholic; local shops carry many religious handcrafted products, and the municipality is the site of the Santa Rosa de Lima Seminary, formerly San José Seminary. In El Hatillo – and throughout Venezuela – images of Jesus and Mary are part of the art and culture.

Don Baltasar de León and his wife, Ana Francisca, are remembered for founding and developing El Hatillo. Manuel Escalona is recognised for including El Hatillo in the 19th century independence movement; as in the rest of Venezuela, Simón Bolívar is considered a hero.

=== Heritage ===
Sculpture of Santa Rosalía de Palermo, inside the church named after her. Brought to El Hatillo from Spain by Don Baltasar.

Santa Rosalía de Palermo – born in Palermo, Italy – is the patron saint of El Hatillo. Rosalía was recognised in 1624 when her remains were discovered in a cave, brought to the Cathedral of Palermo, and displayed through the streets of Palermo during a plague. Within three days, the plague ended; Rosalía was credited with saving many from the plague and proclaimed patron saint of the city.

Years later, El Hatillo's founder also believed that Santa Rosalía had protected him from an infection. During the Guipuzcoana scandal in Venezuela, Baltasar's father, Juan Francisco de León, and his sons were held prisoners in Cádiz. Juan Francisco died as a consequence of smallpox, but Don Baltasar completed his years in prison and then moved to El Hatillo. Baltasar brought the legacy of Santa Rosalía de Palermo to El Hatillo, believing she protected him from the pestilence that killed his father in Cádiz.

Part of El Hatillo's culture has grown around Santa Rosalía; she is believed to be the one who takes care of the people and protects El Hatillo from any pandemic that could hit the area. Don Baltasar's most evident inclusion of Rosalía into El Hatillo's culture occurred at least twice: first in 1776, when El Calvario chapel was built and dedicated to the Saint; and then in 1784, when a bigger parish church named Iglesia Santa Rosalía de Palermo was constructed.

=== Regional celebrations ===
In addition to the nationwide activities celebrating Christmas, the New Year, Carnival, and Easter, El Hatillo has a number of celebrations unique to the region. Since the 1766 founding of El Hatillo, a week-long festival honoring Santa Rosalía de Palermo (Spanish: Fiestas Patronales en honor a Santa Rosalía de Palermo) is held in September featuring parades, Catholic masses, and traditional games, concluding with the traditional release of balloons accompanied by fireworks. On Holy Thursday, an image of the crucified Christ is decorated with flowers and paraded around El Hatillo's Plaza Bolívar in the Jesus Christ Procession. Since 1938, Carnival has been celebrated in El Hatillo with dancing, parades, and the election of a Carnival Queen in Plaza Bolívar. The founding of El Hatillo is commemorated on June 12 with organised activities including traditional games, mass, and balloons. A tradition having religious and agricultural significance has been celebrated every May since the beginning of the twentieth century. The third Sunday of May is the festival of Dama antañona, in which residents pay homage to the women of El Hatillo, with typical food and gifts.

=== Art ===
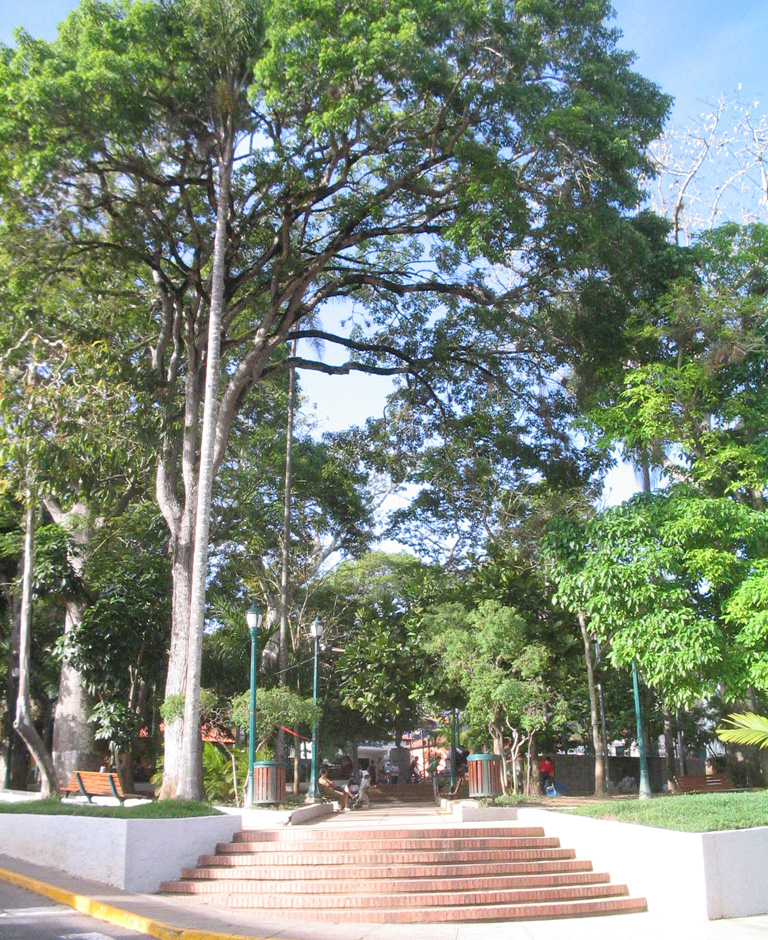
Bolívar Square, the heart of El Hatillo.

The Cultural and Social Center El Hatillo, El Hatillo Art Center, and El Hatillo Atheneum are the local centers of artistic activity. In 2006, Dave Samuels inaugurated the annual International Music Festival of El Hatillo at the El Hatillo Art Center; Samuels was followed by Simón Díaz, Steve Smith, Serenata Guayanesa, Mike Stern and other notable musicians. Since 1999, the El Hatillo Jazz Festival has attracted visitors to the municipality to hear national and foreign jazz artists.

El Hatillo's art culture is rich with handcrafted products. Pottery is a common souvenir for tourists, and there are many artisans devoted to ceramics and pottery in the municipality. The Turgua Group is an artist collective of almost twenty potters and blacksmiths, founded in 1992 by Guillermo Cuellar, an internationally known potter. The group has two exhibitions a year, which have expanded from pottery exposition to jewelry, photography, woodwork, drawing and weaving.

In May 2005, the local government collaborated with the Japanese Embassy to organise Japan Cultural Week, an exposition held in the Art Center featuring bonsai, origami, kimono, martial arts, anime and other manifestations of the Japanese culture. The event offered free workshops for learning these Japanese arts. Continuing cultural promotion in the municipality, the III Salón de Fotografía El Hatillo – a photography contest for children, amateur and professional photographers – was organised in October 2005.

=== Cuisine ===
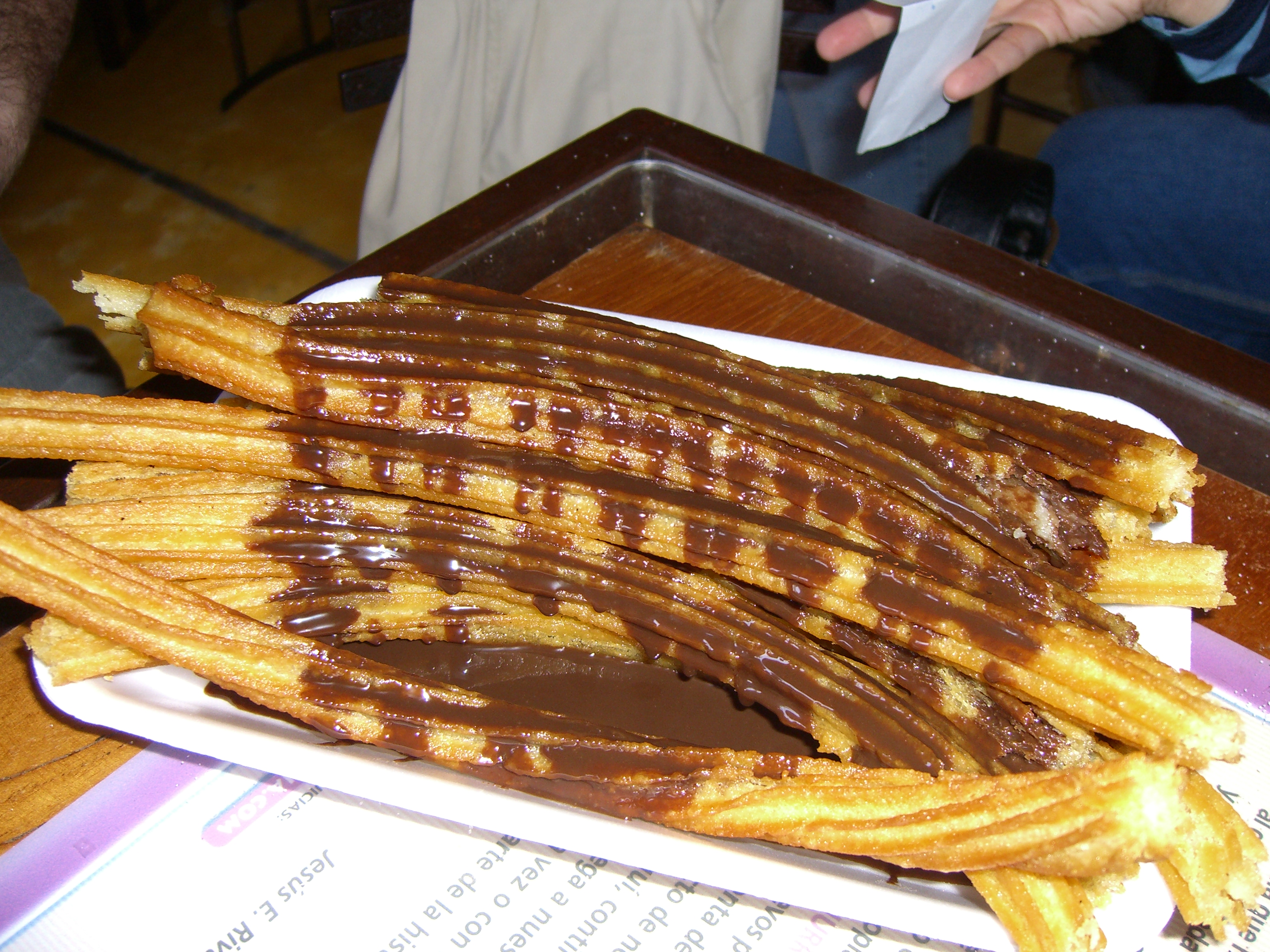
Churros with chocolate.

The cuisine industry in El Hatillo has grown along with the commercial development of the municipality. A September 2006 article in Estampas – a weekly Venezuelan magazine – described the culinary arts of El Hatillo, noting that El Hatillo offers the usual Venezuelan table, as well as new gastronomic developments. There are also typical cachapa restaurants and cafés, as well as other restaurants with a fusion of foreign and national food. El Hatillo also offers many varieties of confectionery, such as churros, pastry and ice cream. There are a variety of other restaurants in El Hatillo, offering such diverse cuisine as German and Thai food.

=== Sports ===
Lagunita Country Club is one of the most important sports facilities in the municipality. The club offers tennis and swimming, but it is best known for its golf course, the home of the 1974 WGC-World Cup. Designed by Dick Wilson, the club began with temporary headquarters in 1959, opening officially in 1964. Lagunita Country Club played an important role in the development of La Lagunita neighborhood – an ambitious urban project, which has become one of the wealthiest areas of Caracas.

Hiparión is another club located in El Hatillo; according to the Venezuelan Census of Cultural Heritage, this equestrian facility from the 1930s was originally used for horse trips, but it later became a place for the training and caring of horses. The Club Hiparión is internationally known for its equestrian training.

Located at the highest point of the Municipality lies El Volcan, a small mountain of about 1500 meters from sea level. This mountain has a Downhill course that has about 500 meters of vertical drop, it is used by hundreds of riders a day during dry and wet weather, mostly on weekends. The course is open to the public and riding is neither specifically allowed nor prohibited by law. The trails are also used by hikers all week long. Shuttles are about 10 Venezuelan bolivars per trip, they run from the parking lot of a Farmatodo drug store in La Boyera, up to the summit using public avenues and paved roads, taking from 15 minutes to 30 minutes depending on traffic on the area. The course apart from being used mostly for recreational purpose, also has been used for irregularly scheduled downhill races due to the lack of organisation in the riders community.

=== Tourism and recreation ===
The hub of activity in El Hatillo Town is Bolívar Plaza (Spanish: Plaza Bolívar), a garden square encompassing the central block in the town of El Hatillo. Constructed in 1785, the Plaza was originally called Plaza Mayor or Plaza del Mercado. In 1911, a bust honoring Manuel Escalona was placed in the square, which was renamed in his honor. In 1952, the bust was replaced with a statue of Simón Bolívar, and the plaza was again renamed after the Venezuelan hero. Across from the Bolívar Square is the 18th century Santa Rosalía de Palermo Church, which was declared a National Historic Monument in 1960.

The statue of Simón Bolívar, erected in 1952, replaced the one of Manuel Escalona.

Between El Hatillo and La Lagunita is the smaller Manuel Escalona Plaza (Spanish: Plazoleta Manuel Escalona), another urban monument displaying the bust of Escalona that formerly occupied Bolívar Square. Sucre Plaza (Spanish: Plaza Sucre) – graced since 1915 with a ceiba tree at its center – is in the southern part of town; this was historically where people tied their mules while frequenting The Four Corners, and it is also known as Plaza La Ceiba. The Four Corners (Spanish: Las Cuatro Esquinas) was a convenient social gathering spot in El Hatillo, comprising a general store, hardware shop, gambling place and bar.

La Lagunita is the site of the San Constantino and Santa Elena Romanian Orthodox Church. The building is an architectural work from the 16th century, brought from Romania, made completely from oak and fir woods, and detailed with more than 40,000 individually placed and carved tiles. It is one of only 15 churches of its type remaining in the world, and one of only two outside of Romania, the other being in Switzerland.

For children, the Caicaguana hacienda in La Lagunita houses the Expanzoo, where visitors can see and touch exotic animals. The zoo is recognised for offering unique employment opportunities; the workers are from families with few resources, and the staff include the mentally ill. The Baby Zoo is another place for children to interact with animals; visitors can feed and touch the animals, ride horses and rent the location for special events. More interaction with nature can be experienced by visiting the Morro la Guairita park in El Cafetal – commonly known as the Indian Caves (Spanish: Cuevas del Indio) – a system of 22 natural openings in the mountain, and the only place in Caracas where rock climbing is permitted. Guided tours are available, and views of El Ávila can be enjoyed while ascending the park.

== Transportation ==
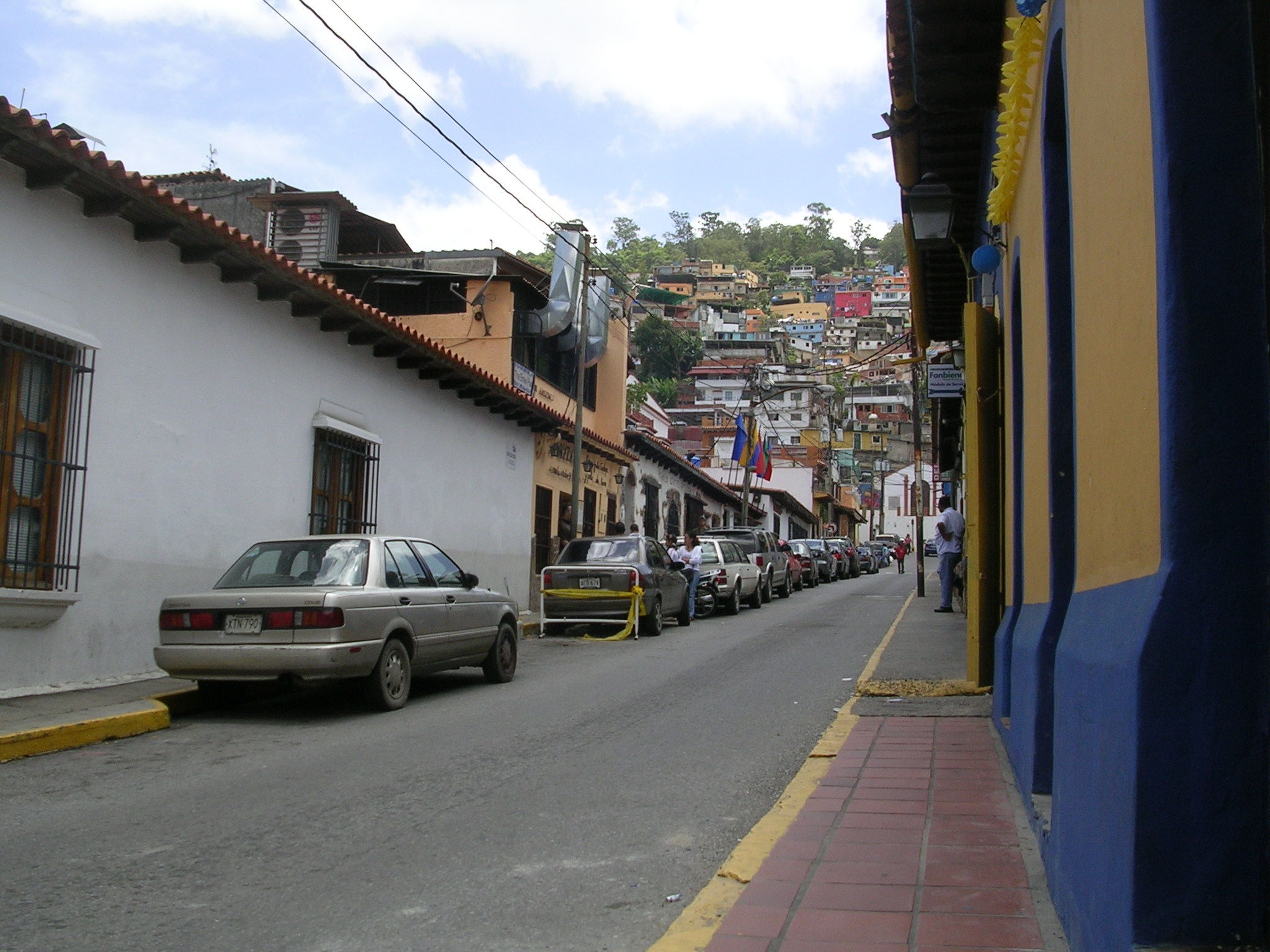
A traditional street with colonial houses.

The mountainous terrain and geographic features of El Hatillo have made it difficult to extend the Caracas Metro to southeast Caracas, so the main transportation methods in the municipality are private vehicles and road public transportation. An extension of the Metro – Line 5 – has been proposed, but construction has not been initiated as of 2007; phase 2 of Line 4 is still under construction. Urban planning in the municipality has been unorganised; news archives show that at least since 1998, neighbors have been complaining about the dense traffic caused by new residential and commercial construction, yet new or enhanced alternative roads to resolve the traffic problems have not been completed. A south beltway suggested 25 years ago has not been constructed due to its high cost. However, as of January 2006, a new route that will connect La Lagunita with Macaracuay – a neighborhood in northeast Caracas – is under construction and is planned to be completed in 2010; according to Mayor Catalán, 23% of El Hatillo's inhabitants will eventually use this transit way. Its cost was estimated in early 2006 as US$19,572,000.

Local solutions – such as the proposed Metro extension line and the road connecting La Lagunita and Macaracuay – may improve the traffic congestion around El Hatillo, but the traffic issue affects all of Caracas. It is estimated that one million vehicles transit Caracas daily, causing a collapse of the transportation network. Automobiles travel at an average speed of 15 km/h (9 mph) on the streets and highways of Caracas. There are numerous factors contributing to the traffic problem in Caracas. According to the Venezuelan Society of Transportation Engineers, a city should allocate 20% of its public area to transportation; in Caracas, less than 12% is allocated. In 2004, fifty thousand new vehicles were sold in Caracas. In 2005, sixty thousand more were sold, and as of November, 2006, seventy thousand more had been sold. In five years, 250 thousand more cars are circulating in Caracas on roadways that have not increased proportionally to the increase in the number of cars. Further, public transportation is not fully reliable; an average trip in the city using mass transit takes around ninety minutes.

== See also ==
- Molluscs of El Hatillo Municipality, Miranda, Venezuela
