= Baruta Municipality =

Baruta Municipality Municipio Baruta
- Municipality
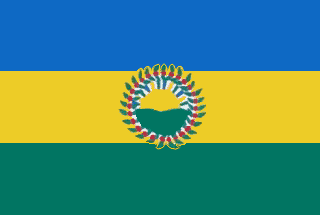
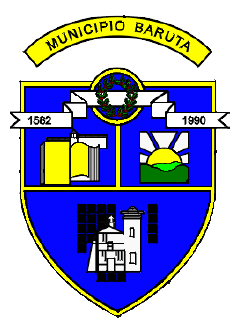
- Flag Coat of arms

- Location in Miranda

- Location in Venezuela
- Coordinates: 10°25′44″N 66°52′23″W
- Country: Venezuela
- State: Miranda
- City: Caracas
- Founded: August 19, 1620
- Incorporated: January 4, 1990
- Municipal seat: Nuestra Señora del Rosario de Baruta

Government
  - Mayor: Darwin González

Area
  - Total: 72.7 km^{2} (28.1 sq mi)

Population
  - Total: 362,371
  - Density: 4,980/km^{2} (12,900/sq mi)
- Time zone: UTC−4 (VET)
- Area code(s): 0234
- Website: Official website

Baruta (pop. 317,288) is a municipality within the Metropolitan District of Caracas in Venezuela.

== Geography ==
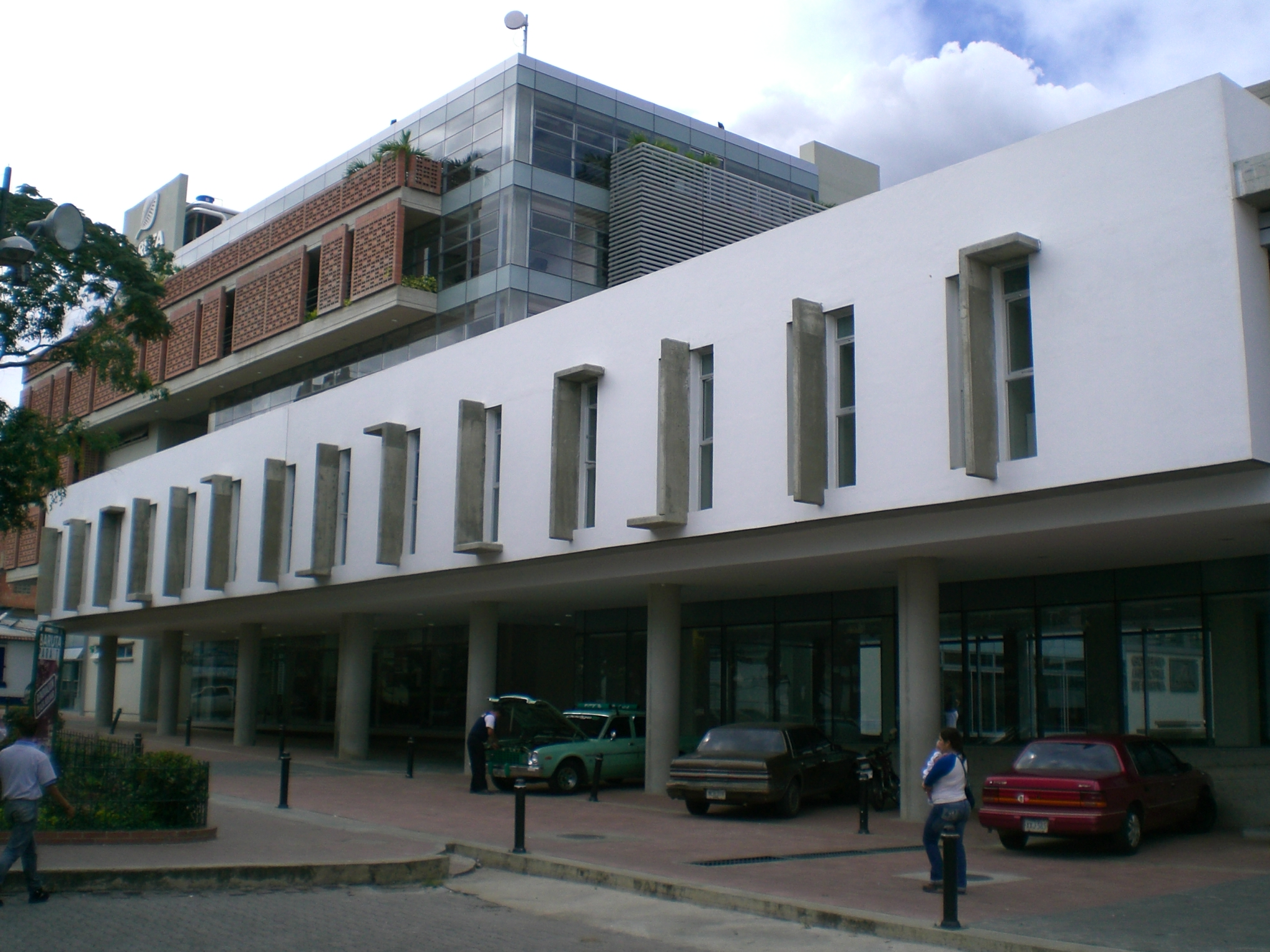
Baruta Municipality City Hall

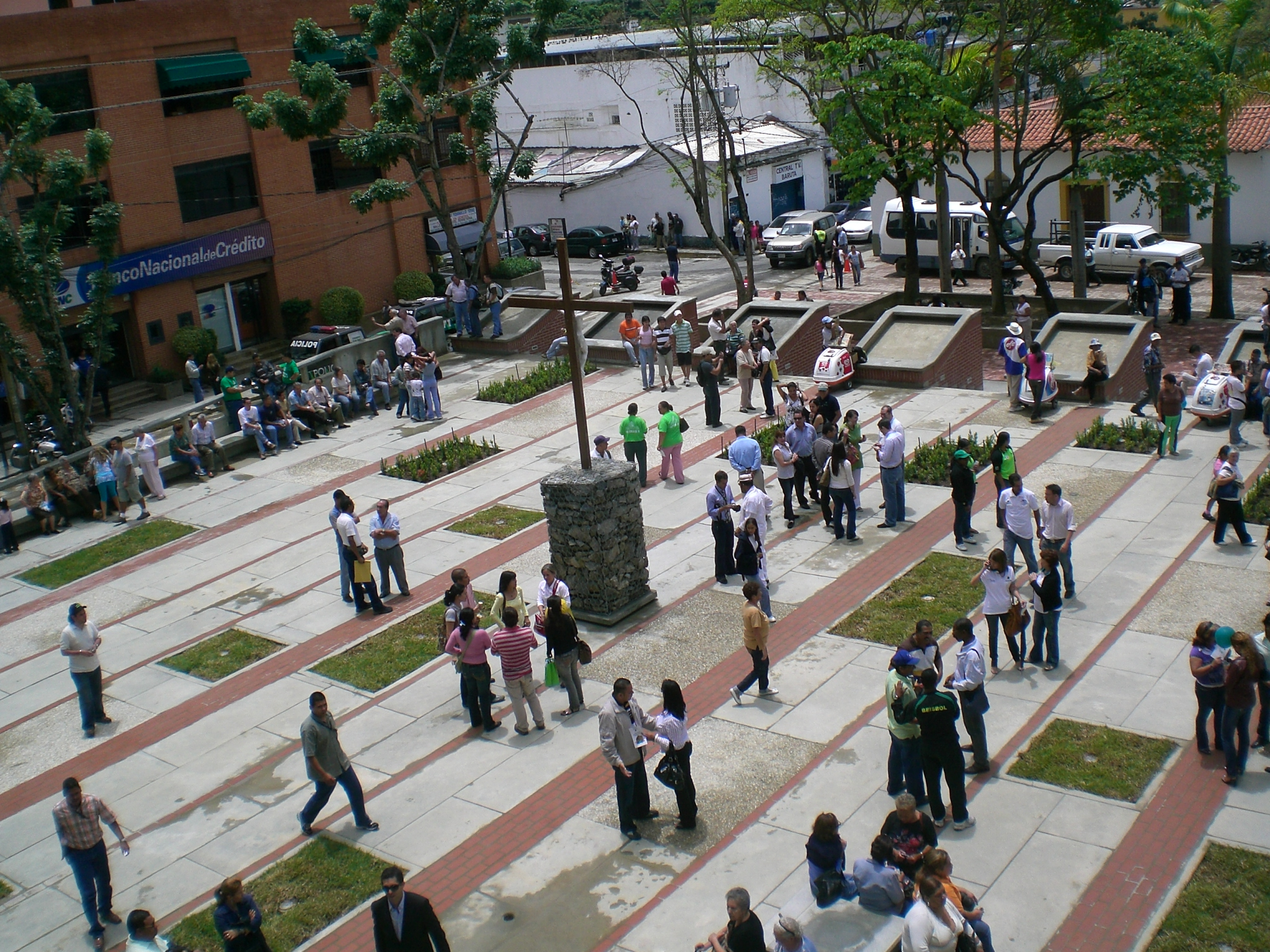
Plaza El Cristo at Nuestra Señora del Rosario de Baruta church.

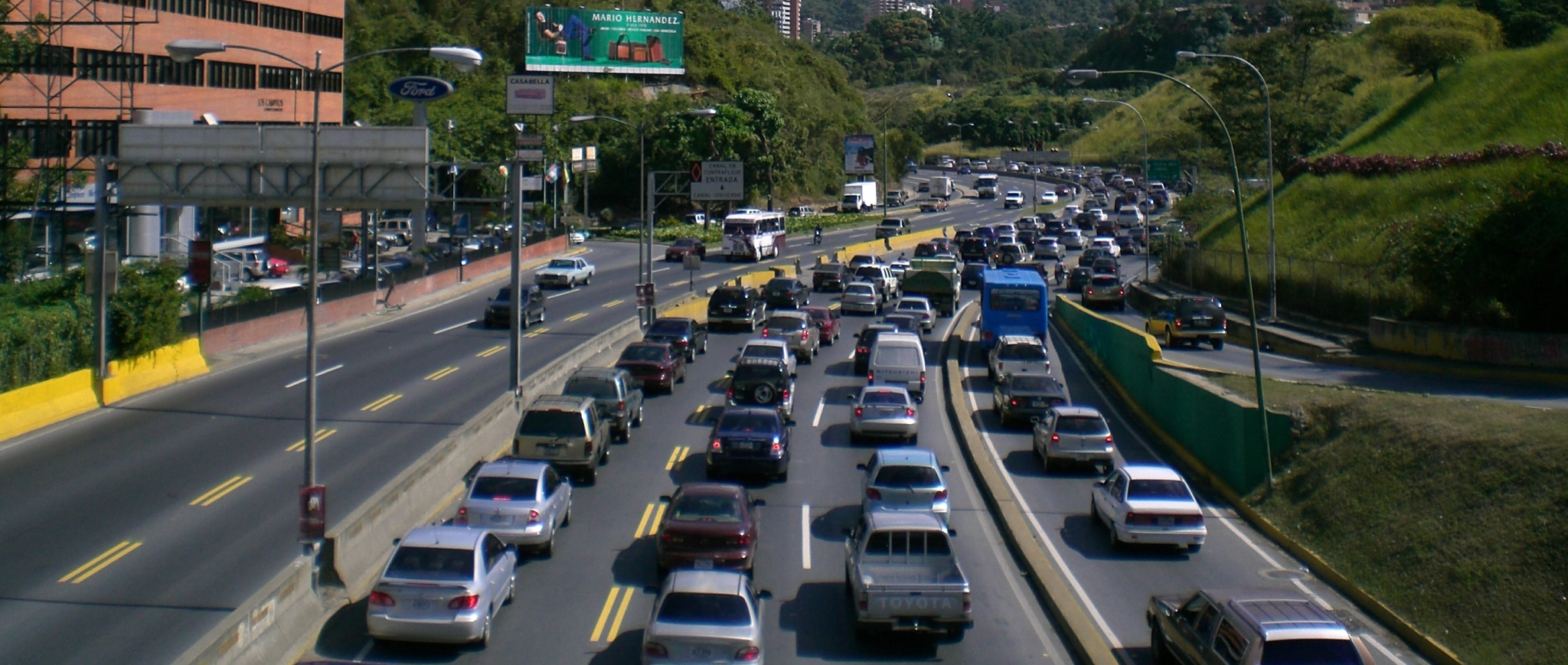
Autopista Prados del Este (Prados del Este Highway), important road in the municipality

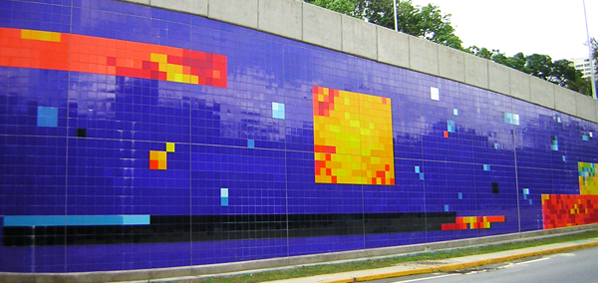
Mural Jardín Lumínico, ceramic tiles mural by Patricia van Dalen on Prados del Este Highway.

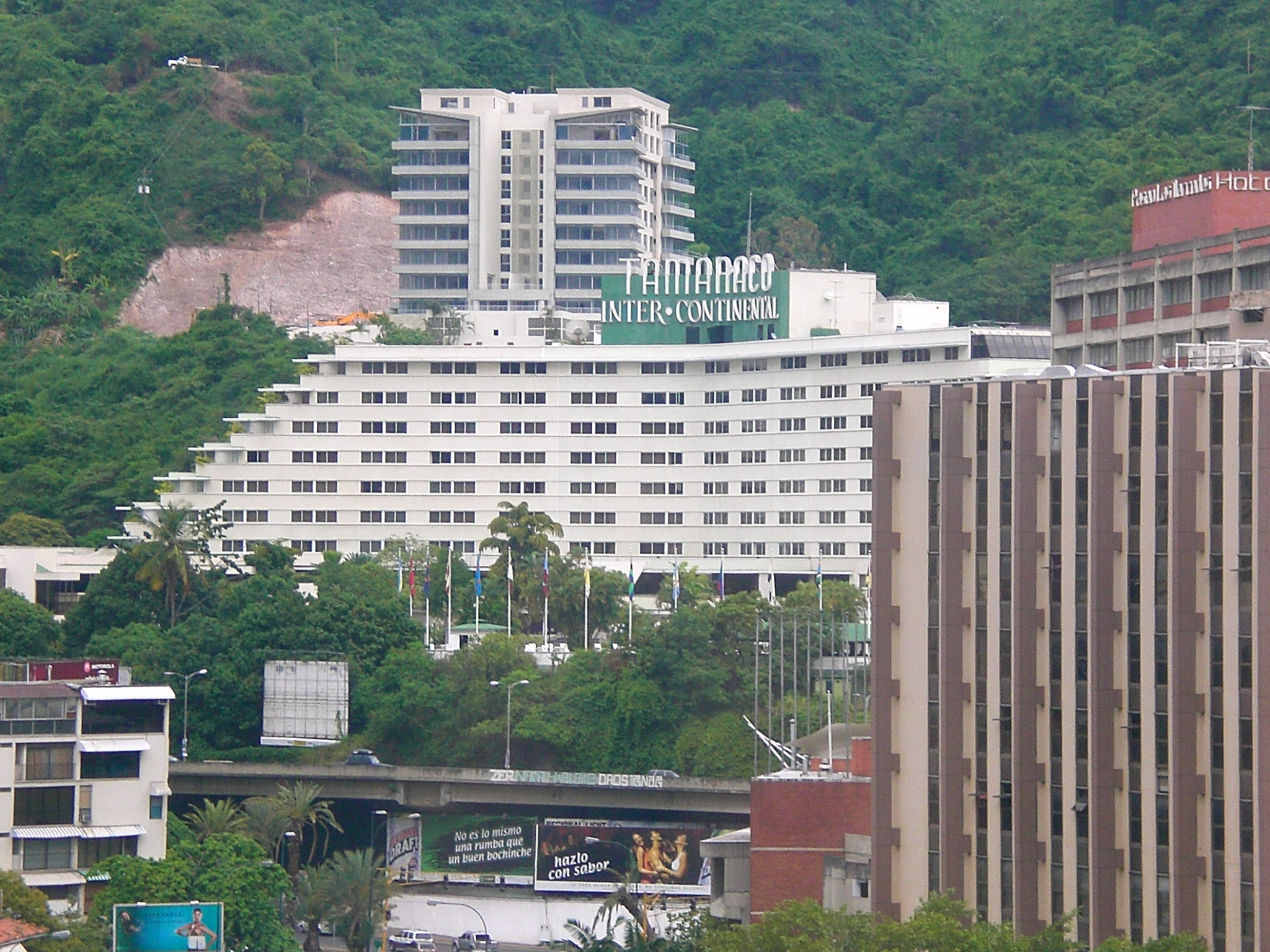
Tamanaco Hotel, important to the municipality and Caracas.

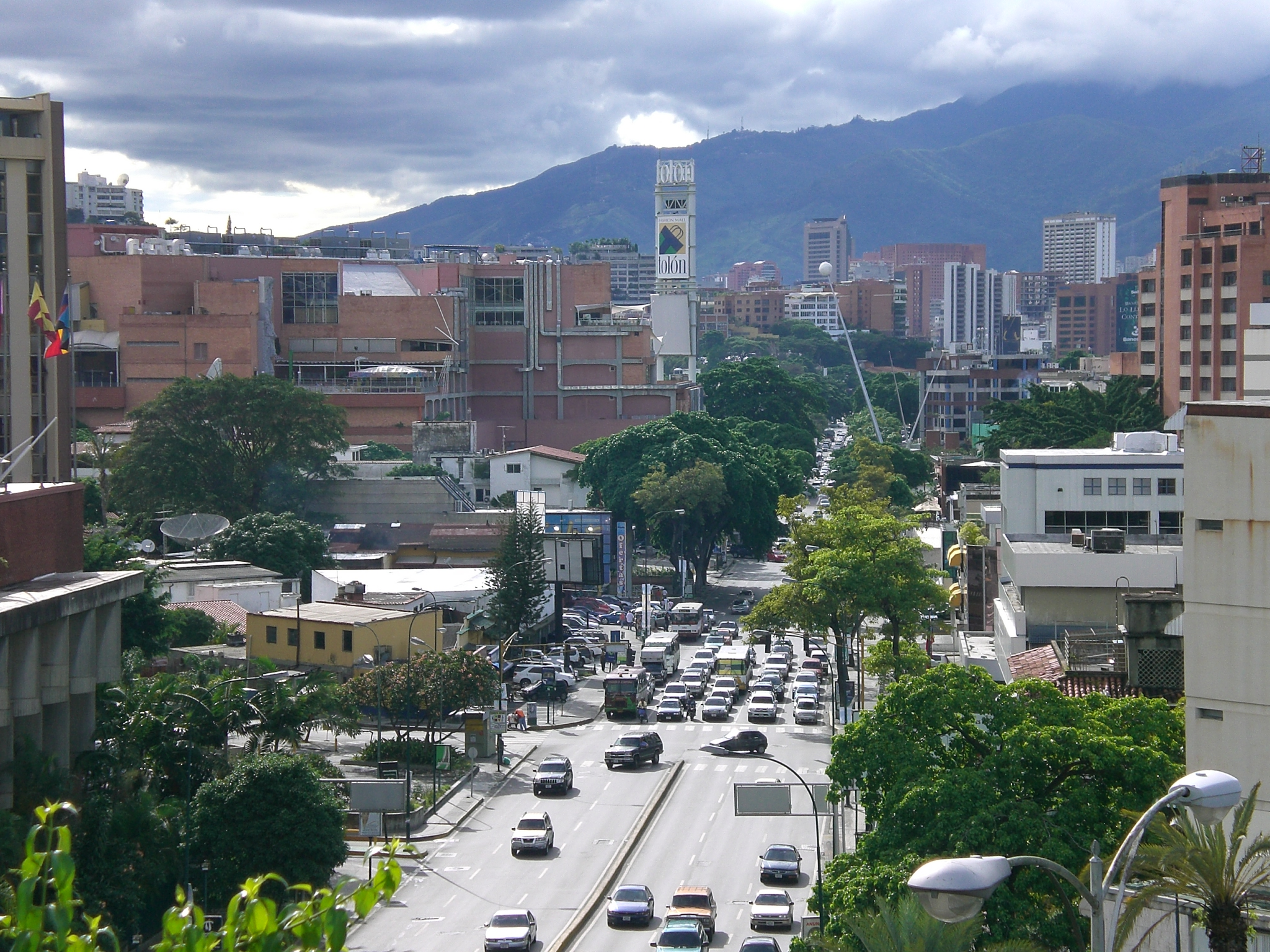
Las Mercedes commercial district of the municipality

Baruta is located geographically in the South-East section of the city. Its western limit is the Los Chaguaramos neighborhood (which belongs to the Libertador Bolivarian Municipality) and limits to the east with the Colinas de Los Ruices neighborhood, in the Sucre Municipality. To the North, it borders with the Francisco Fajardo Highway and to the Southeast with the El Hatillo Municipality and to the Southwest with the Hoyo de la Puerta neighborhood (Libertador Municipality).

== Economy ==
The main economic activity in Baruta is non-manufacturing business in the many office buildings within the Municipality. For example, the Procter & Gamble Latin American Headquarters are located there. Commerce is also a great source of revenue for the Baruteños, as some of the most attractive night spots in the Greater Caracas are located in Las Mercedes. Moreover, "Las Mercedes" hosts a number of small businesses, shopping malls, and restaurants that make the area commercially rich. The Baruta Zip Code is 1080 and the Area Code is 212, the same as the Greater Caracas area.

== Demographics ==
- 317,288 inhabitants.
- Density: 2.600 inhabitants/km^{2}.

Parishes

- Nuestra Señora del Rosario de Baruta
- Las Minas de Baruta
- El Cafetal

== Government ==
Although some of the political functions overlap with the Greater Caracas Municipality, Baruta has its own Mayor, Darwin Gonzalez.

The local government has its own police force, among other responsibilities. The City Hall is currently located in the old Baruta town.

=== Mayors ===
Period	Mayor	Political Party	% of votes	Notes
1989-1992	Gloria Lizárraga de Capriles	COPEI		First Mayor
1992-1995	Ángel Enrique Zambrano	Decisión Ciudadana		
1995-2000	Ivonne Attas	COPEI		
2000-2004	Henrique Capriles Radonski	Justice First	62.99	
2004-2008	Henrique Capriles Radonski	Justice First	78.83	Re elected
2008-2013	Gerardo Blyde	Un Nuevo Tiempo	83.07	
2013-2017	Gerardo Blyde	Un Nuevo Tiempo	79.81	Re elected
2017-2021	Darwin González		49.73	

== Culture ==
In the Municipality diverse cultural manifestations are developed, some associates to popular celebrations, like:

- Day of the Candlemas (Paradura del niño), Date of celebration: February 2.
- Carnival, Date of celebration: movable.
- Holy week, Date of celebration: movable.
- The cross of May, Date of celebration: May 3.
- Saint Anthony, Date of celebration: June 13.
- Saint John, Date of celebration: June 24.
- Day of Our Lady of the Rosary of Baruta (Month of Baruta), Date of celebration: October 29.
- Day of Our Lady of Fatima (Las Minas and Monterrey), Date of celebration: October 30.

=== Urbanización Las Mercedes ===
- Trasnocho Cultural: founded in 2001 in the Paseo Las Mercedes Shopping Center, it houses theaters, cinema, bookstore and the TAC art gallery, as well as a variety of shops.
- Teatro Escena 8.
- Plaza Alfredo Sadel: named in homage to the Venezuelan tenor of the same name. Since its remodeling in 2007, this space has become a venue for concerts, exhibitions, book fairs and cultural, political and sporting events.

=== Bello Monte ===
- La Caja de Fósforos: experimental theater room founded in 2014, as part of the stage space management project of the Contrajuego Theater Group, directed by Orlando Arocha. The room is part of the Concha Acústica de Bello Monte Cultural Complex, or José Ángel Lamas Acoustic Shell.
