= Military advisor =

Soldier sent to a foreign nation to aid that nation in various military tasks

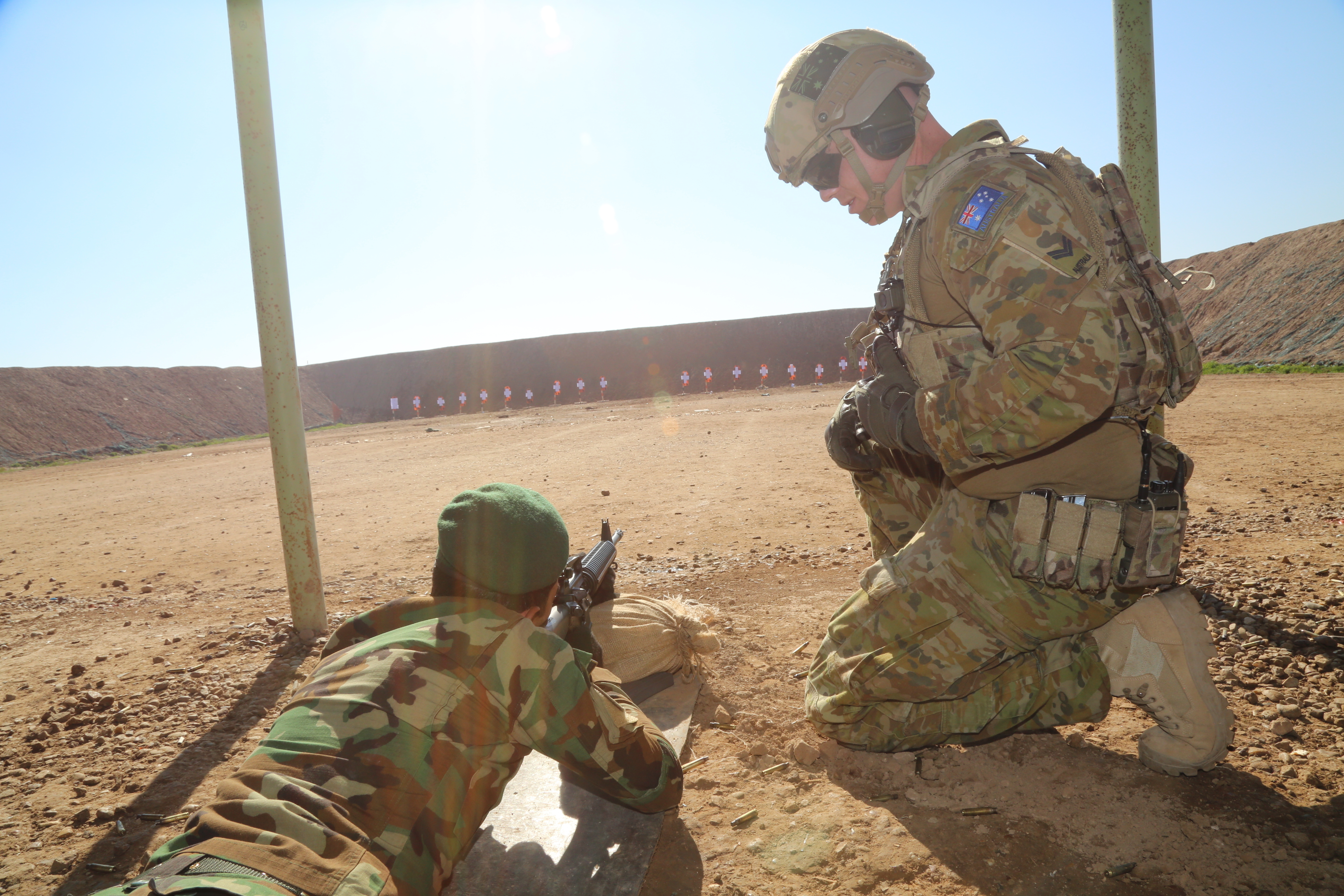
An Australian Army soldier instructing an Iraqi Ground Forces soldier at Camp Taji during the War in Iraq, 2016

Military advisors or combat advisors are military personnel deployed to advise on military matters. The term is often used for soldiers sent to foreign countries to aid such countries' militaries with their military education and training, organization, and other various military tasks.

Foreign powers or organizations may send such soldiers to support countries or insurgencies while minimizing the risks of potential casualties and avoiding the political ramifications of overtly mobilizing military forces to aid an ally.

== European advisors during American Revolutionary War ==
The French Marquis de Lafayette and the Prussian Baron von Steuben offered key assistance to the Continental Army during the American Revolutionary War of 1775–1783.

== Soviet military advisors ==
The Soviet Union deployed military advisors in places like Spain, China, and Angola. "The 1976 treaty of friendship and cooperation provided for Soviet-Angolan military cooperation in strengthening the mutual defense capacity. Moscow immediately provided weaponry and supplies, and some 500 military advisors."

"The Soviet Union also sent about 1500 military advisors to China during this period [1937-1939]. Included were some of the Red Army's best officers [...] Georgii Zhukov [...] Vasilii I. Chuikov [...] P.F. Batitsky [...] Andrey A. Vlasov [...]. Like Spain, China served as a training ground for Soviet officers."

The main and most important activity which the military advisors of the Soviet Union performed was organizing the Popular Army of the state. It was recognized as early as July 23, 1936, that the Republic would require a more united and structured military. With the help of Spanish commanders, military advisors of the time came to the decision that the disorganized militias which formed the Soviet Union's military could no longer function on their own, and their combination marked the beginning of the nation's Popular Army.

Beyond their involvement in Spain, China and Angola, Soviet military advisers were deployed extensively throughout the Cold War in support of allied governments and national liberation movements across Eastern Europe, Asia and the Middle East, Africa and Latin America. Advisers served in countries like Egypt, Syria, Vietnam, Iraq, Ethiopia, Afghanistan, Cuba and Mongolia, where they assisted with military planning, organisation, training, logistics, weapon maintenance and the integration of Soviet doctrine and equipment into local armed forces. Depending on the mission, Soviet personnel included senior advisers, instructors, technical specialists and military attachés. some of whom accompanied local units during combat operations or helped operate sophisticated weapon systems such as air defense missile networks. By the 1970s and 1980s, the Soviet Union maintained one of the world's largest military advisory programmes, using these missions to strengthen allied militaries. support its foreign policy objectives and expand its strategic influence while avoiding the large scale deployment of Soviet combat forces in many regional conflicts.

== German military advisors ==
=== Nationalist Spain ===
During the Spanish Civil War, Germany deployed a large number of "volunteers," also known as the Condor Legion, to serve as mercenaries and pilots to assist the nationalist forces. Approximately 300 out of a total of 16,000 German citizens fighting in the war were killed.

=== Republic of China ===
During the interwar period, German military advisors under Alexander von Falkenhausen were involved in modernizing the National Revolutionary Army.

=== Ottoman Empire ===
The German Empire sent advisors to the Ottoman Empire, notably generals such as Otto Liman von Sanders and Colmar Freiherr von der Goltz.

== United Kingdom military advisors ==
British Military advisors have historically been employed to assist allied and partner forces through training, operational planning and organizational development. During the nineteenth and twentieth centuries, British officers participated in military missions to several foreign states, reflecting the United Kingdom's broader imperial and diplomatic interests.

T. E. Lawrence ("Lawrence of Arabia") is among the best known British military advisors. He became arguably the archetypal British military advisor for his role in the guerilla (1916–1918) during the Arab Revolt.

Since the Cold War, the British Armed Forces have increasingly employed advisory teams as part of defense engagement and security assistant missions. British personal have served as advisors and mentors in conflicts including: Oman, Sierra Leone, Afghanistan and Iraq, focusing on training local security forces, improving command structures and supporting institutional military reform.

== United States military advisors ==
Developing capabilities and increasing capacity through advising is an operation the U.S. Army has conducted for more than one hundred years. The Army has performed advisory missions to increase the capability and capacity of foreign militaries from the Philippine Insurrection at the beginning of the 20th century to more recent conflicts in Vietnam, Iraq and Afghanistan.

=== Advisors in Vietnam ===
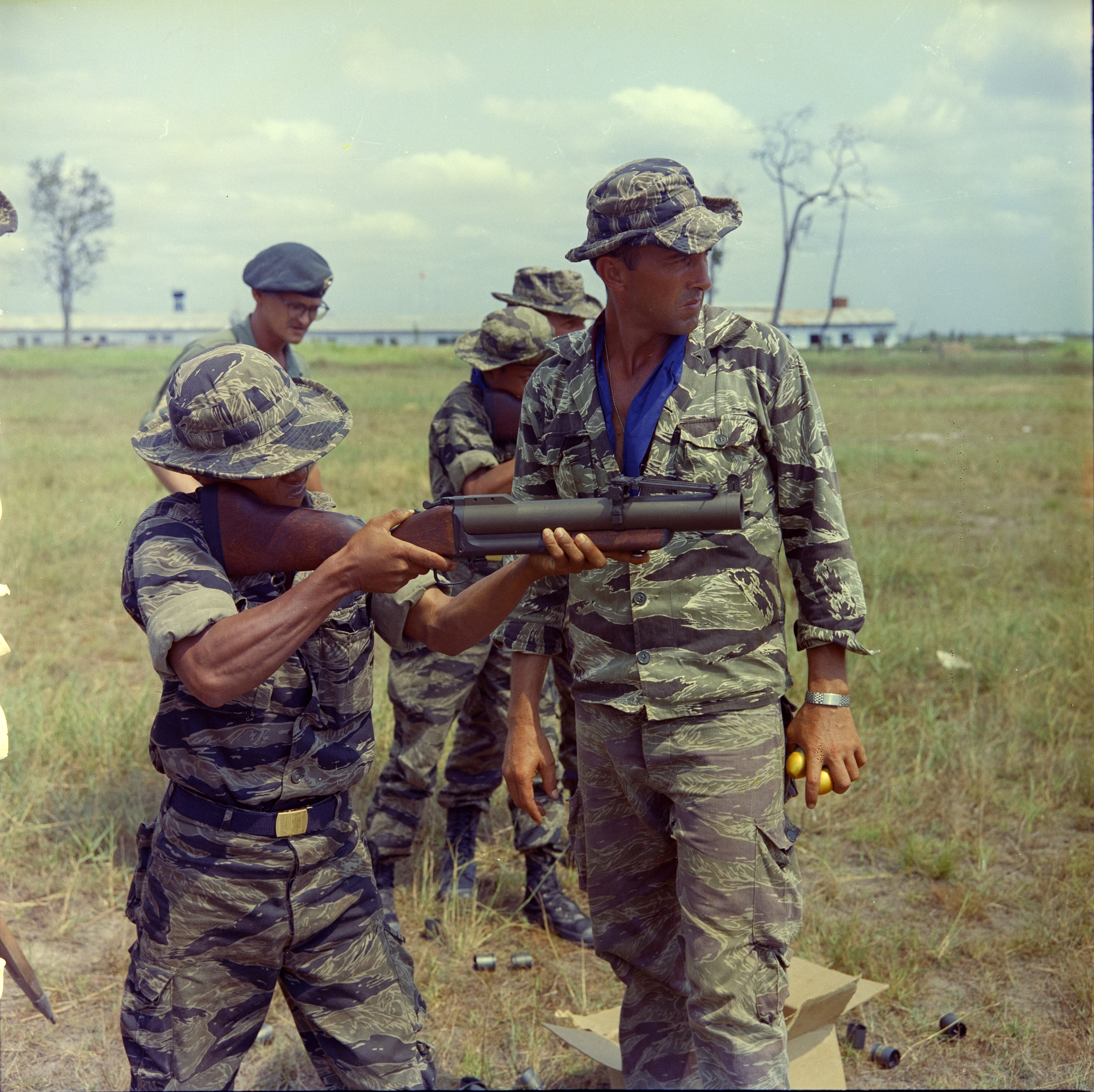
A U.S. Army Special Forces advisor instructing a Vietnamese Civilian Irregular Defense Group trainee on operating an M79 grenade launcher during the Vietnam War, 1967

In the early 1960s, elements of the U.S. Army Special Forces and Echo 31 went to South Vietnam as military advisors to train and assist the South Vietnamese Army (ARVN) for impending actions against the North Vietnamese Army (PAVN). U.S. Marines also filled a significant role as advisors to Vietnamese forces.

=== Advisors during war on terror ===
Combat advisors served during the U.S. war on terror. They were designated as Embedded Training Teams (ETTs) in Afghanistan and as Military Transition Teams (MTTs) in Iraq. The soldiers and marines lived with their Afghan and Iraqi counterparts, often in very austere and stoic conditions, in remote combat outposts, often a great distance away from any U.S. or coalition support.

ETTs and MTTs were composed primarily of U.S. Army, National Guard, and Marine Corps personnel with a background in combat arms. U.S. Army Reserve, Air Force, and Navy personnel served as advisors in logistics and other support roles. The advisors on the ground in infantry or commando units of the ANA (Afghan National Army) or the Iraqi Army were soldiers or marines with experience in combat arms. U.S. Army Special Forces and Navy SEALS also worked with the Afghan Army or Special Forces and with the Iraqi Army, but most combat advisors were infantry and combat-arms soldiers and marines.

The Combat Advisor Mission Defined. The combat advisor mission requires US officers and NCOs to teach, coach and mentor host nation (HN) security force counterparts. This enables the rapid development of our counterparts' leadership capabilities; helps develop command and control (C2) and operational capabilities at every echelon; allows direct access to Coalition Forces (CF) enablers to enhance HN security force counterinsurgency (COIN) operations; and incorporates CF lethal and nonlethal effects on the battlefield.

Security Forces Assistance (SFA) defines a more in-depth method of embedded mentorship. MTTs have fallen into disuse with shifts in focus and doctrine. Specifically, previous MTTs were drawn from soldiers from separate units, often on an ad hoc basis. SFATs, on the other hand, provide all personnel from organic, modular brigade combat teams, rather than supplying personnel piecemeal from various Army units. By design, those teams are composed of a company command team and selected leaders from one command. The SFAT concept has been in place since 2012 with a "by, with and through" method of combat advising. Current Advisory Teams are trained at Fort Polk, Louisiana, at the Advisor Academy, "Tigerland."

== See also ==
- Foreign internal defense
- Embedded Training Teams
- Military transition team
- Military Assistance Command, Vietnam
- Chinh–Hunnicutt affair
- Prince Rupert of the Rhine (1619–1682)
- Tadeusz Kościuszko (1746–1817)
- Jean Victor Marie Moreau (1763–1813)
- Charles François Dumouriez (1739–1823)
- Giuseppe Garibaldi (1807–1882)
- Dmitry Pavlov (1897–1941)
- Cuban intervention in Angola (1975–1991)
- Nicaraguan Revolution (1978–1990)
- Salvadoran Civil War (1979–1992)
- United States invasion of Grenada (1983)
- Group of Belarusian military specialists in Venezuela (2008–2013)
