= Venezuelan oil =

Venezuelan oil may refer to:

- History of the Venezuelan oil industry
- Oil reserves in Venezuela
