= United States intervention in Venezuela =

United States intervention in Venezuela may refer to:

- United States involvement in the Venezuelan oil industry
- United States sanctions during the Venezuelan crisis
- Operation Southern Spear, a 2025–2026 military and surveillance campaign
  - 2026 United States intervention in Venezuela, a military strike in which Nicolás Maduro was captured

== See also ==
- United States–Venezuela relations
- Proposed United States invasion of Venezuela
