= Hunnicutt =

Hunnicutt is a surname. Notable people with the surname include:

- Arthur Hunnicutt (1910–1979), American actor
- Benjamin Kline Hunnicutt, professor of Leisure Studies at the University of Iowa
- Gayle Hunnicutt (1943–2023), American actress
- R. P. Hunnicutt (1926–2011), American historian, known for research for armored fighting vehicles

Fictional characters:

- B. J. Hunnicutt, fictional character in TV series M*A*S*H
- Danika Hunnicutt, fictional character in TV series American Dragon: Jake Long
- Jolene Hunnicutt, fictional character in TV series Alice
- Liam Hunnicutt, fictional character in animated TV series The Loud House

== See also ==
- Chinh-Hunnicutt affair, Vietnam war political scandal
- H. P. Hunnicutt Field, stadium in Princeton, West Virginia
- Holnicote Estate
- Honeycutt
