= Honeycutt =

Honeycutt is a surname, derived from the English town of Hunnacott.

Notable people with the surname:

- Francis Honeycutt (1883–1940), American fencer
- Heidi Honeycutt, journalist, actress, filmmaker, and film programmer
- Jay F. Honeycutt (born 1937), American NASA administrator
- Jerald Honeycutt (born 1974), American basketball player
- Kaden Honeycutt (born 2003), American racing driver
- Rob Honeycutt, American entrepreneur
- Roger Honeycutt, American murder victim
- Rick Honeycutt (born 1954), American baseball player and coach
- Tyler Honeycutt (1990–2018), American basketball player

== Fictional characters ==
- Emmett Honeycutt, a character from the Showtime series Queer as Folk
- Matthew Honeycutt, a character from the novel series The Vampire Diaries

== See also ==
- 5536 Honeycutt, an asteroid
- Hunnicutt
