= United States involvement in the Venezuelan oil industry =

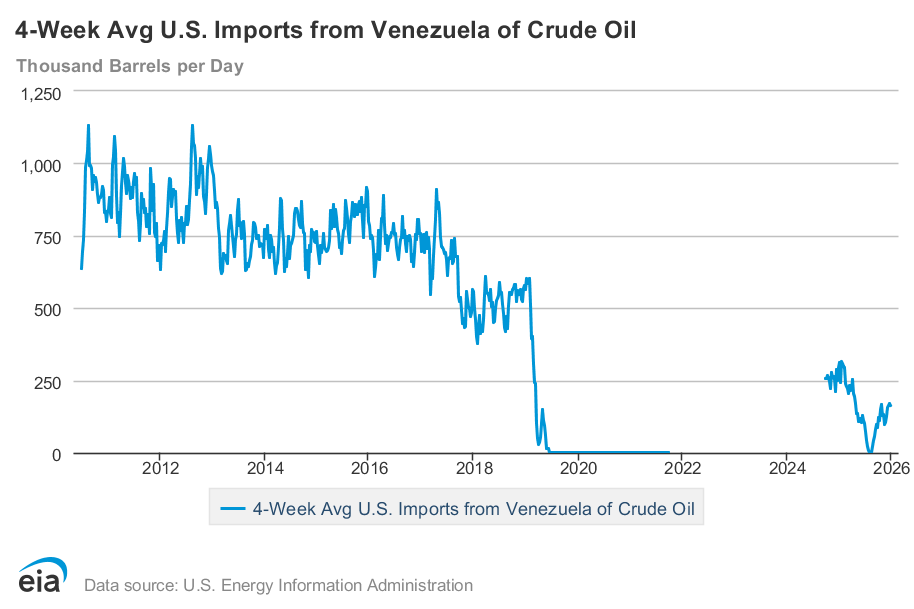
Imports of Venezuelan crude oil into the United States from July 2010 to early January 2026. American trade with Venezuela dropped significantly in 2019 and 2020 as the result of mounting sanctions. No EIA data is available between October 2021 and September 2024.

The United States has had considerable involvement in the Venezuelan petroleum industry, beginning in the 1920s near the discovery of oil in the country and continuing beyond the nationalization of oil in the 1970s. Originally one of the largest suppliers of oil to the United States, import of Venezuelan crude oil has dropped significantly due to compounding sanctions from the United States government, starting in 2014 and all but ceasing oil trade by 2025. These sanctions have negatively affected Venezuelan oil production.

Since late 2025, the United States has expressed an extraordinary interest in Venezuelan oil and has carried out blockades and strikes against Venezuela, culminating in the January 3 strikes, the results of which on the petroleum industry are still unknown.

== Initial discovery of oil and American involvement (1912–1935) ==
On 15 September 1883, the government of Venezuela granted a 25-year concession to mine asphalt in Lake Bermudez to the American Horacio R. Hamilton. The New York & Bermúdez Company was incorporated in October 1885, and Hamilton assigned his Bermudez concession to the new company in November 1885, which was finally approved by the Venezuelan government in December 1885. The area was developed with a wharf, stores, buildings, a railroad, a refinery and an electric power plant. In December 1888, the concession was extended to ninety-nine years.

New companies playing on contractual grey areas set up shop on the lake starting in 1897. A political struggle followed. President Cipriano Castro, who take power in 1899, a year later definitely broke Hamilton's exclusive rights on the lake.

In 1901 the government under Cipriano Castro put higher taxes on the company; in response the company supported politically the opposing side under Manuel Antonio Matos. The conflict escalated and culminated in 1902–1903 in the "Asphalt War". The political turmoil even led to a temporary interruption in the diplomatic relations with the US between June 1908, after Castro had expropriated the company.

President Castro, by November 1908 had been seriously ill for four years due to a kidney problem, left for Paris to seek medical treatment for syphilis, leaving the government in the hands of vice president Juan Vicente Gómez, the man who was instrumental in his victories in Asphalt war. However, on 19 December 1908, Gómez seized power himself and effectively ended the war with the Netherlands. Relying on allied merchants and ranchers, the Gómez assumed command as dictator, counting on the support of multiple opponents of Cthe astro regime and foreign governments with interests in Venezuela. The Secretary of State of the United States lent three war battleships and a high commissioner to support Gómez in exchange for a change in Venezuelan foreign investment policy.

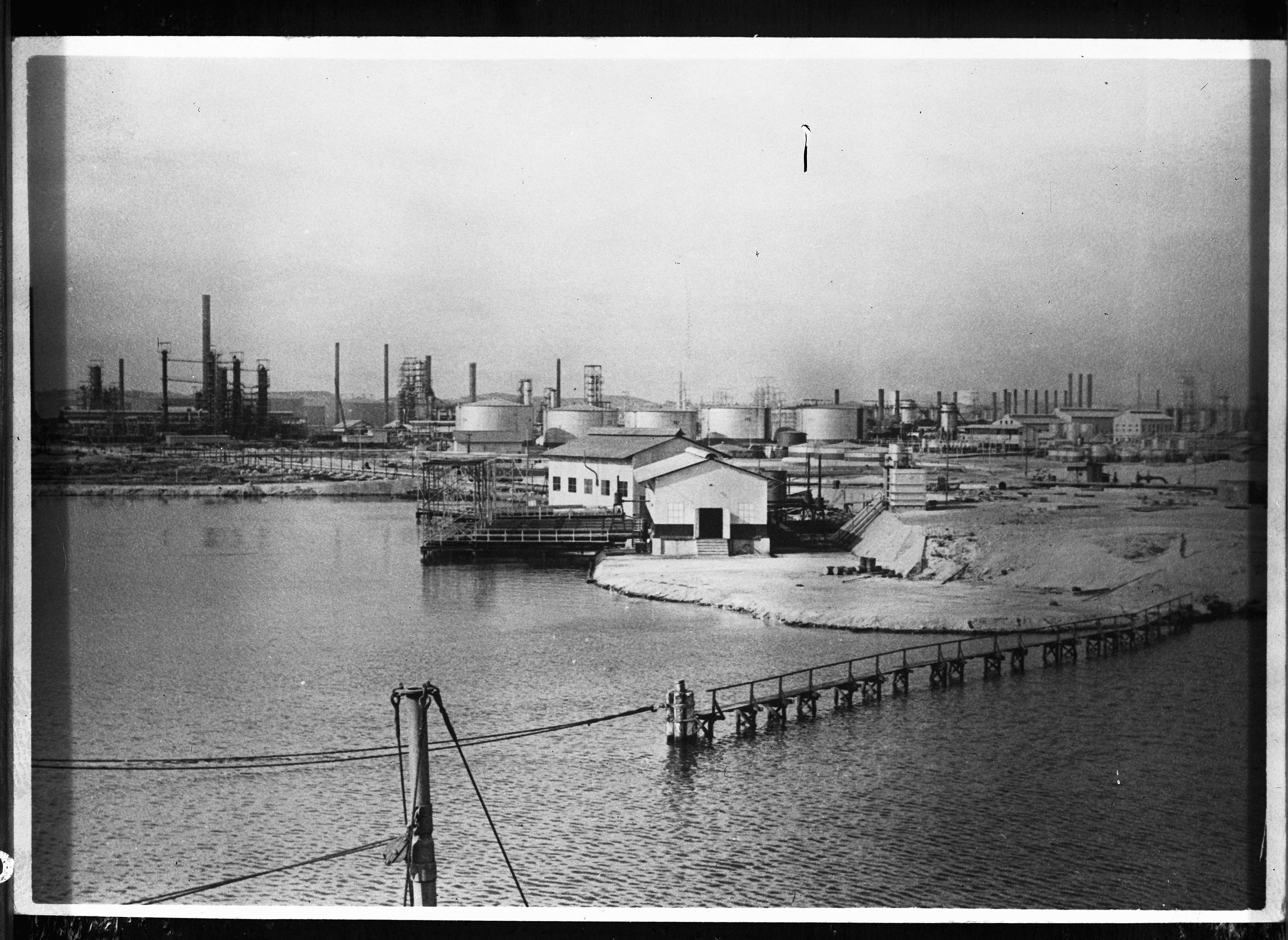
Early 1940s photograph of an oil refinery in Curaçao. Royal Dutch Shell used refineries in Curaçao to process oil extracted in Venezuela.

Large-scale land acquisition by foreign and national companies for oil prospecting began in 1912. In 1916, Royal Dutch Shell constructed a refinery on the nearby island of Curaçao, a Dutch colony, where Venezuelan oil could be processed and then shipped internationally. Despite some initial resistance from the Gómez government, Exxon and Gulf Oil, both American companies, soon surpassed Shell in production by 1928. By 1929, annual production rose significantly from over a million of barrels to 137 million, making Venezuela second in total output, only behind the United States. Shell, Gulf Oil and Exxon account for 99 percent of the total oil production during Gómez's reign.

During the global depression, there was a nearly 20 percent decrease in Venezuelan oil exports.

== Increased government royalties and nationalization (1943–1976) ==
=== Hydrocarbon Law of 1943 ===
In 1943, President Isaias Medina Angarita issued the Hydrocarbon Law of 1943, replacing much of the previous 1922 legislation. The law required reversion of all concessions within forty years and set royalties to 16.67 percent of oil extracted. Later amendments in 1948 required a 50 percent of the profits generated by the companies to be issued to the state. Despite worry from oil companies that this would destroy the industry, production continued to increase normally.

=== US involvement post-WW2 ===
Venezuela served as a huge supplier of oil to the Allies of World War II, but began to have a diminishing stake in US oil imports when President Dwight D. Eisenhower established a new quota system which reduced Venezuela's share of US foreign imports from 71.9 percent to 59.4.

By the 1960s, the United States was the largest foreign investor in not only the petroleum industry but many other Venezuelan sectors as well, such as mining. While much of Venezuela experienced significant economic inequality, Venezuelan oil workers received 27,300 bolívares in 1960 on average, equivalent to approximately USD$78,000 in 2021.

=== Nationalization of oil ===
In August 1971, under the presidency of Rafael Caldera, a law was passed that nationalized the country's natural gas industry.

Nationalization of oil became official during the first presidency of Carlos Andrés Pérez, whose economic plan, "La Gran Venezuela", called for the nationalization of the oil industry and diversification of the economy via import substitution. The country officially nationalized its oil industry on January 1st 1976, creating the Venezuelan state-owned petroleum company Petróleos de Venezuela S.A. (PDVSA).

American subsidiaries such as Exxon Corporation, the Gulf Oil Corporation and the Mobil Oil Corporations, which had at the time invested more than 5 billion dollars in the industry, received marginal compensation during the nationalization process. While many United States presidents during the period agreed with the premise of reducing imports of oil, such as from Venezuela, import of foreign oil only increased.

== Economic crises and presidency of Hugo Chávez (1980–2013) ==
=== Second presidency of Pérez ===
During the 1980s oil glut, oil prices began to decrease significantly. Oil demand dropped during the period, in part due to increased energy production from sources other than oil, such as nuclear power and natural gas. The United States' Energy Policy and Conservation Act of 1975 caused passenger car fuel efficiency to rise by more than 50 percent, again reducing American demand for petroleum. This severely impacted the oil-dominant economy of Venezuela; four out of five Venezuelans lived in poverty by 1992.

Pérez, in his second presidency, decided to respond to the debt, public spending, economic restrictions and rentier state by privatizing the economy. In 1992, Pérez declared interest in privatization of the petroleum industry, with American companies such as Conoco and Mobil beginning negotiations almost immediately.

=== Economic changes under Chávez ===
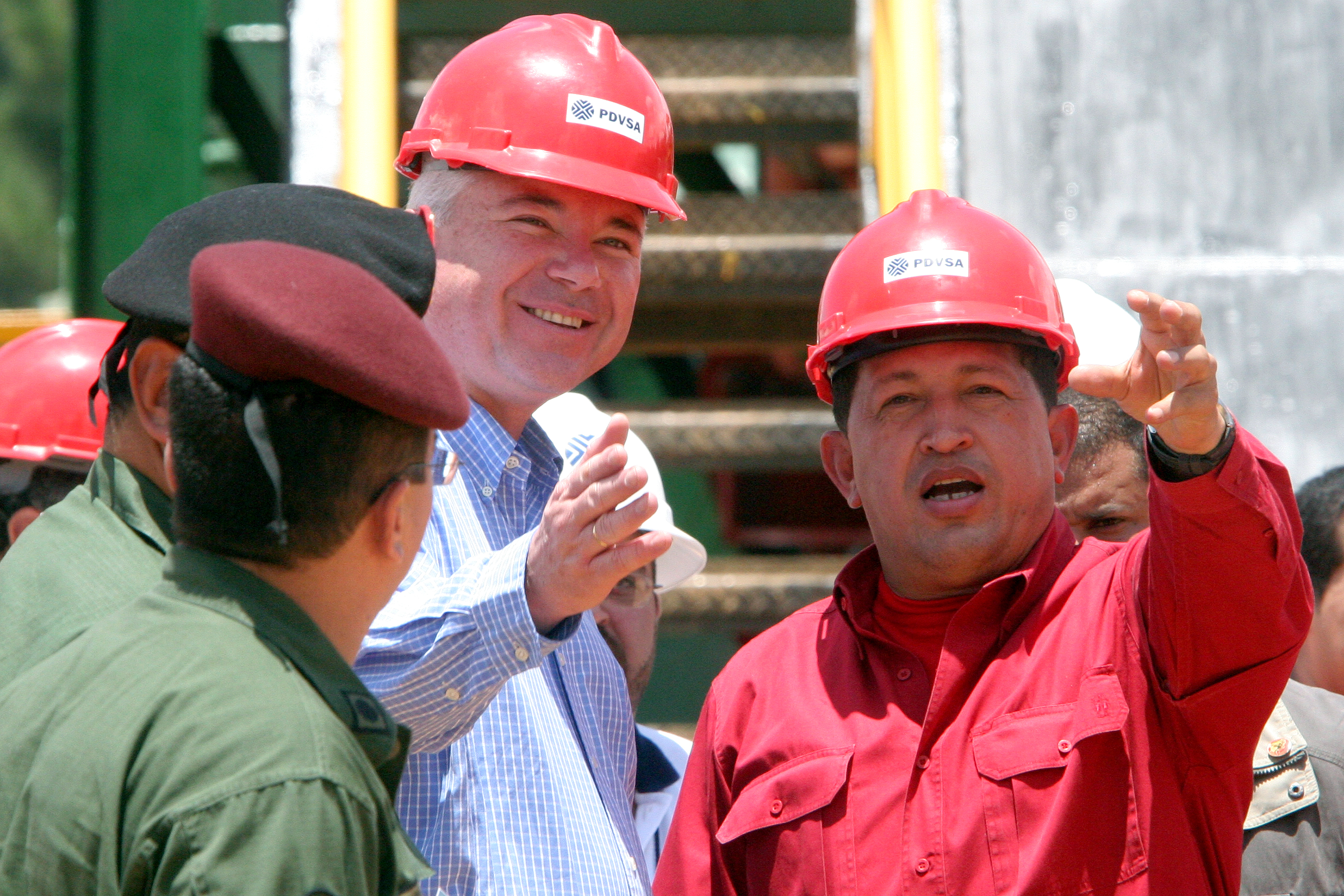
Rafael Ramírez (center left), then President of PDVSA, alongside President Hugo Chávez (right)

Elected president in 1998, Hugo Chávez carried out many social and economic changes in Venezuela, which altered the nature of the petroleum industry and lead ultimately to a change in Venezuelan-American relations. Chávez returned to a "sowing the oil" economic plan reminiscent of earlier Venezuelan administrations, intending to move income from oil into social programs and greater industralization of Venezuela.

As of 2006, Venezuela was one of the largest suppliers of oil to the United States, sending about 1.4 million barrels per day (220×10^{3} m^{3}/d) to the U.S.

==== 2007 Expropriations ====
In 2007, PDVSA bought 82% percent of Electricidad de Caracas company from AES Corporation as part of a renationalization program. Subsequently, the ownership share rose to 93.62% by December 2008. Assets of ExxonMobil and ConocoPhillips were expropriated in 2007 after they declined to restructure their holdings in Venezuela to give PDVSA majority control; Total, Chevron, Statoil and BP agreed and retained minority shares in their Venezuelan projects. As of 2026, Exxon and Conoco still have billions of dollars in outstanding claims, with Exxon fighting to reclaim their losses in international court as early as 2008.

== United States sanctions (2014–2025) ==
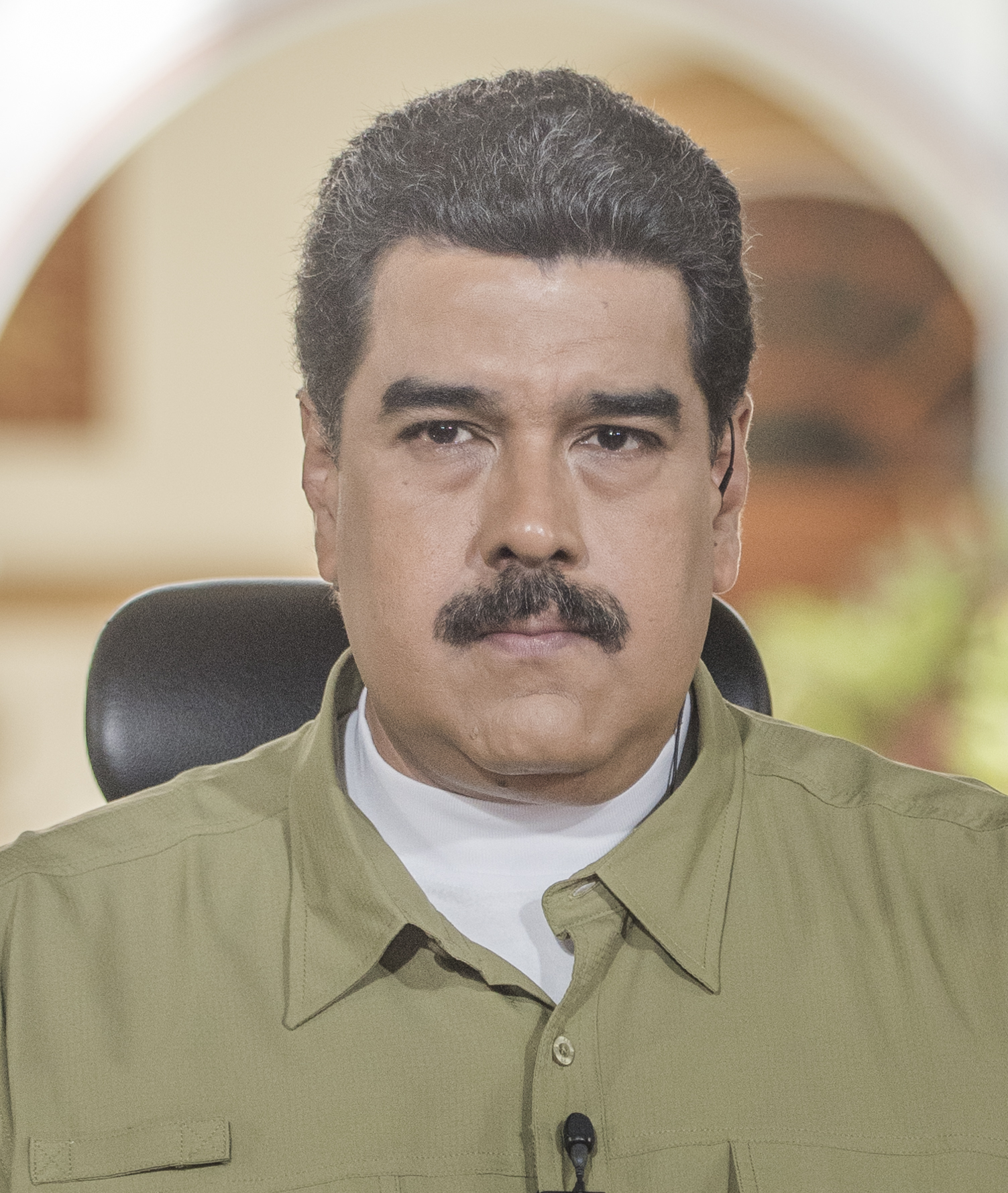
Following Barack Obama's executive order, over 110 Venezuleans were put under sanction by the United States, including President Maduro.

The United States has been imposing sanctions on Venezuela in some capacity since 2006, although full sanctions against petroleum trade itself did not occur until much later. In 2014, the United States Congress passed an act requiring the president to impose sanctions on those "identified as responsible for acts of violence, serious human rights abuse, or antidemocratic actions", according to the US Congressional Review Service. President Barack Obama issued E.O. 13692 in the following year to implement this policy.

=== 2015 PDVSA Investigation ===
In 2015, the US Justice Department initiated an investigation into corruption within PDVSA which uncovered extensive bribery and money laundering schemes involving PDVSA officials and contractors. As of 2021, this had led to 28 individuals being charged, with 22 pleading guilty.

=== Sanctions during the first Trump administration ===
During the Venezuelan crisis, President Donald Trump imposed sanctions that affected Venezuela's petroleum industry. In August 2017, the U.S. government imposed economic sanctions against the petroleum industry by prohibiting the trading of Venezuelan bonds on U.S. markets.

In January 2019, the U.S. imposed additional sanctions on PDVSA in an effort to pressure President Nicolás Maduro to step down during the 2019 Venezuelan presidential crisis.

=== Temporary lifting of sanctions ===
In October 2023, the Joe Biden administration temporarily lifted some US sanctions on the oil, gas, and gold industries operating in the country for 6 months, following the Barbados agreement. However, by April 2024, the U.S. government announced the reinstatement of some sanctions. Some companies continued operating in Venezuela due to receiving individual licenses, such as the Chevron Corporation.

=== Sanctions during the second Trump administration ===
In February 2025, President Donald Trump announced that he was reversing the authorization that the Biden Administration granted to Chevron Corp. and its subsidiaries as a concession of promoting free elections and human rights reforms in Venezuela. Most importantly, those licenses authorized certain transactions necessary to the production and exportation and importation into the United States by Chevron, its subsidiaries, or joint ventures. Additionally, in March 2025, President Donald Trump issued an executive order that any country purchasing oil directly or indirectly from Venezuela will pay 25% in tariffs on their exports to the United States that would take effect on April 2, 2025.

== United States intervention in Venezuela (2025–Present) ==
=== Background and US naval blockade ===
In late 2025, the United States significantly escalated its pressure campaign against the Venezuelan government under President Donald Trump, including a naval blockade of sanctioned oil tankers and multiple interdictions of tankers carrying Venezuelan crude oil. U.S. forces seized several Venezuelan oil tankers in the Caribbean Sea and announced sanctions targeting additional vessels and oil trading entities, actions that Venezuela's government condemned as violations of international law. These measures sharply reduced Venezuela's oil exports and led many shipping companies to avoid Venezuelan waters.

In the weeks before January 3, the United States also conducted a series of strikes against maritime vessels it described as drug traffickers and deployed a larger naval and military presence in the Caribbean region.

=== Intervention and removal of sanctions (2026) ===
On January 3, 2026, the United States launched military strikes against targets in and around Caracas and other regions of Venezuela. President Donald Trump announced that Venezuelan President Nicolás Maduro and first lady Cilia Flores had been captured by U.S. forces and transported out of the country, and said the United States would oversee Venezuela during a transition period. Trump repeatedly referred to Venezuelan oil resources and stated that U.S. oil companies would be involved in the country's petroleum industry in cooperation with Venezuelan acting president Delcy Rodríguez, former vicepresident of Maduro. The Trump administration has reportedly developed a plan to control Venezuela's oil for "years to come". Trump's initial attempts to enlist major oil companies, such as ExxonMobil, to invest in oil extraction in Venezuela was met with a "lukewarm" response due to the country's instability, hydrocarbons law and poor infrastructure. However, Shell and Chevron have expressed interest.

On January 14, the United States Department of Energy announced that the United States had completed its first sales of Venezuelan oil valued at $500 million as part of a $2 billion deal between the United States and Venezuelan governments. On 20 January, Delcy Rodríguez confirmed having received the first $300 million. She announced the money will go to the exchange market in Venezuela, the national banks and the central bank.

On January 23, the first cargo of 460,000 barrels of naphtha by Vitol, necessary to deal with the heavy crude oil, arrived in Venezuela. Before that, cargo was last received in December by Chevron Corporation in an agreement with the United States, as the US blockade had stopped many suppliers.

On January 27, Delcy Rodríguez announced that the United States was unfreezing various funds related to 2019 oil sanctions on Venezuela. The next day, Reuters reported that a US refiner, Citgo, bought Venezuelan oil for the first time since 2019.

On January 29, the US Treasury's Office of Foreign Assets Control lifted various oil-related sanctions imposed on Venezuela, authorizing US companies to buy, sell, transport, store and refine Venezuelan crude oil. US sanctions on production of oil were not lifted. The Trump administration also announced that additional sanctions will be lifted soon.

On August 28, Trump announced an agreement with the Venezuelan government giving the United States access to billions of barrels of oil reserves through what he described as a partnership with private business. The principal private participant is North American Blue Energy Partners, controlled by Alejandro Betancourt López, who has been the subject of money-laundering investigations in Spain and Switzerland (but has not been charged). The Defense Department's Office of Strategic Capital, created in 2022 to lend to suppliers of the defense industrial base, is the leading US government entity in the partnership. The New York Times reported that the arrangement would give the department the option to acquire up to 35 percent of the company's parent through a warrant convertible into shares for as little as one cent, and that the federal government would be guaranteed 20 percent of the company's output at production cost, with the State Department holding a right of first refusal over the remainder. Jack Reed, the ranking Democrat on the Senate Armed Services Committee, called the arrangement "a blatant abuse of power and taxpayer dollars".

Following the August agreement, further details released by the White House in early September indicated that the arrangement granted North American Blue Energy Partners a 100-year concession across more than 17 Venezuelan oil fields holding an estimated 65 billion barrels of reserves, positioning the firm behind only Chevron among major operators in the country. Administration officials framed the partnership as a way to help replenish U.S. strategic petroleum reserves and supply Gulf Coast refineries amid global shipping disruptions tied to the conflict with Iran. On October 27, President Trump and Secretary of State Marco Rubio appeared in Corpus Christi, Texas, to mark the arrival of the first two tankers carrying one million barrels of Venezuelan crude produced under the partnership—a shipment Trump described as a gift to the United States, while the company later stated it provided the cargo at no cost to U.S. taxpayers to mark the agreement. By mid-November, the deal drew scrutiny from congressional Democrats, with incoming House Oversight Committee leadership signaling plans for subpoenas to examine how the private contractor was chosen and how crude revenues are managed.

== See also ==
- History of the Venezuelan oil industry
- Oil reserves in Venezuela
