= History of the Venezuelan oil industry =

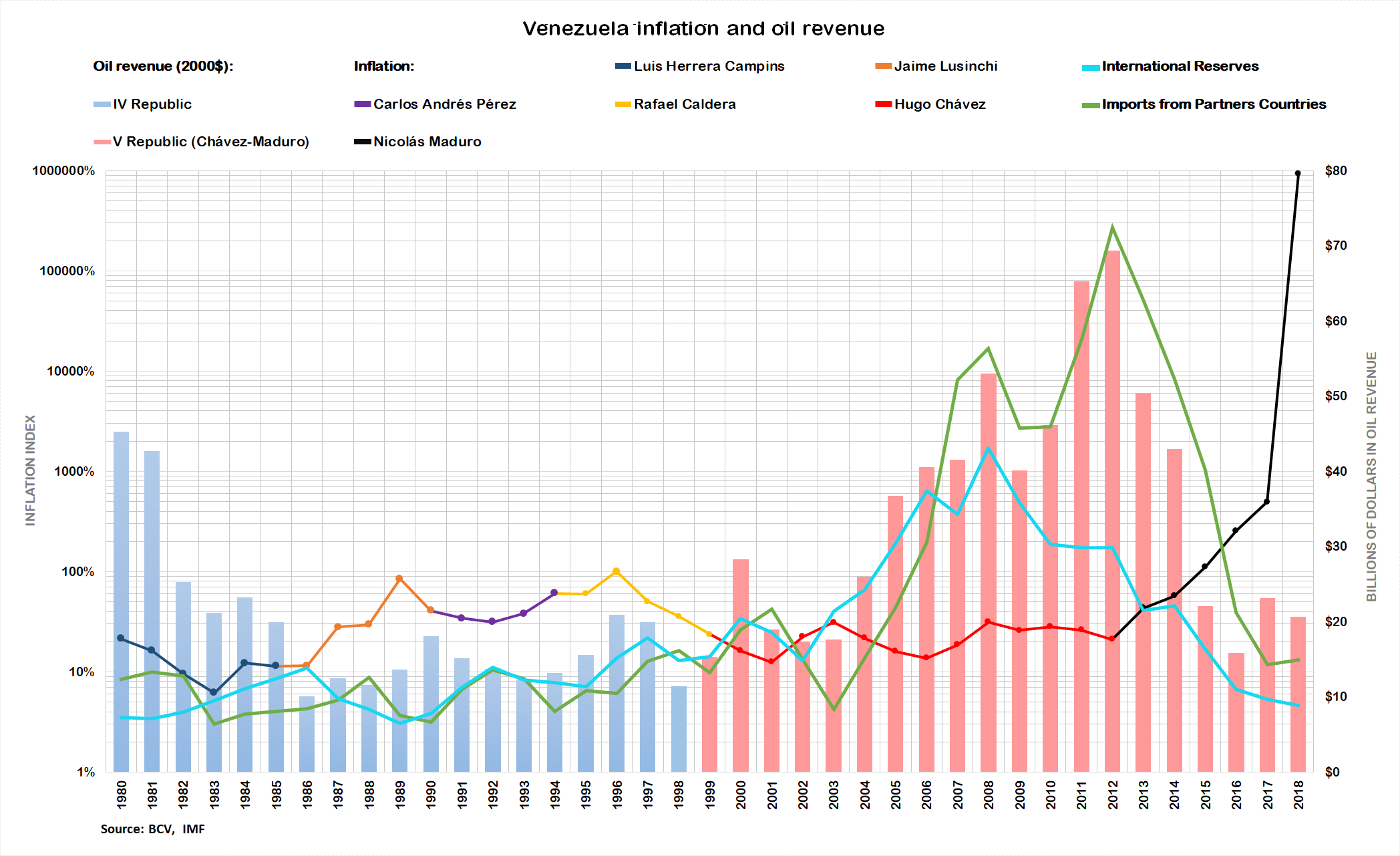
Venezuela's historic inflation rate compared with annual oil revenues

Venezuela has the world's largest proven oil reserves at an estimated 304 billion barrels (18% of global reserves) as of 2020. The country was once one of the world's largest exporters of oil. Oil production peaked in the late 1990s and early 2000s.

In 2008, crude oil production in Venezuela was the tenth-highest in the world at 2,394,020 barrels per day (380,619 m^{3}/d) and the country was also the eighth-largest net oil exporter in the world. Venezuela is a founding member of the Organization of the Petroleum Exporting Countries (OPEC).

== Pre-discovery ==
=== Indigenous usage ===
The Indigenous peoples in Venezuela, like many ancient societies, already utilized crude oils and asphalts from petroleum seeps, which ooze through the ground to the surface, in the years before the Spanish conquistadors. The thick black liquid, known to the locals as mene, was primarily used for medical purposes, as an illumination source, and for the caulking of canoes.

=== Spanish colonization ===
Upon arrival in the early 16th century, the Spanish conquerors learned from the indigenous people to use the naturally occurring bitumen for caulking their ships as well, and for treating their weapons. The first documented shipment of petroleum from Venezuela was in 1539 when a single barrel of oil was sent to Spain to alleviate the gout of Emperor Charles V.

== 1908–1940 ==
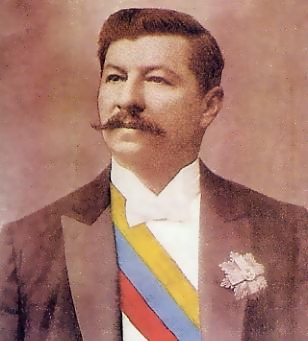
Juan Vicente Gómez

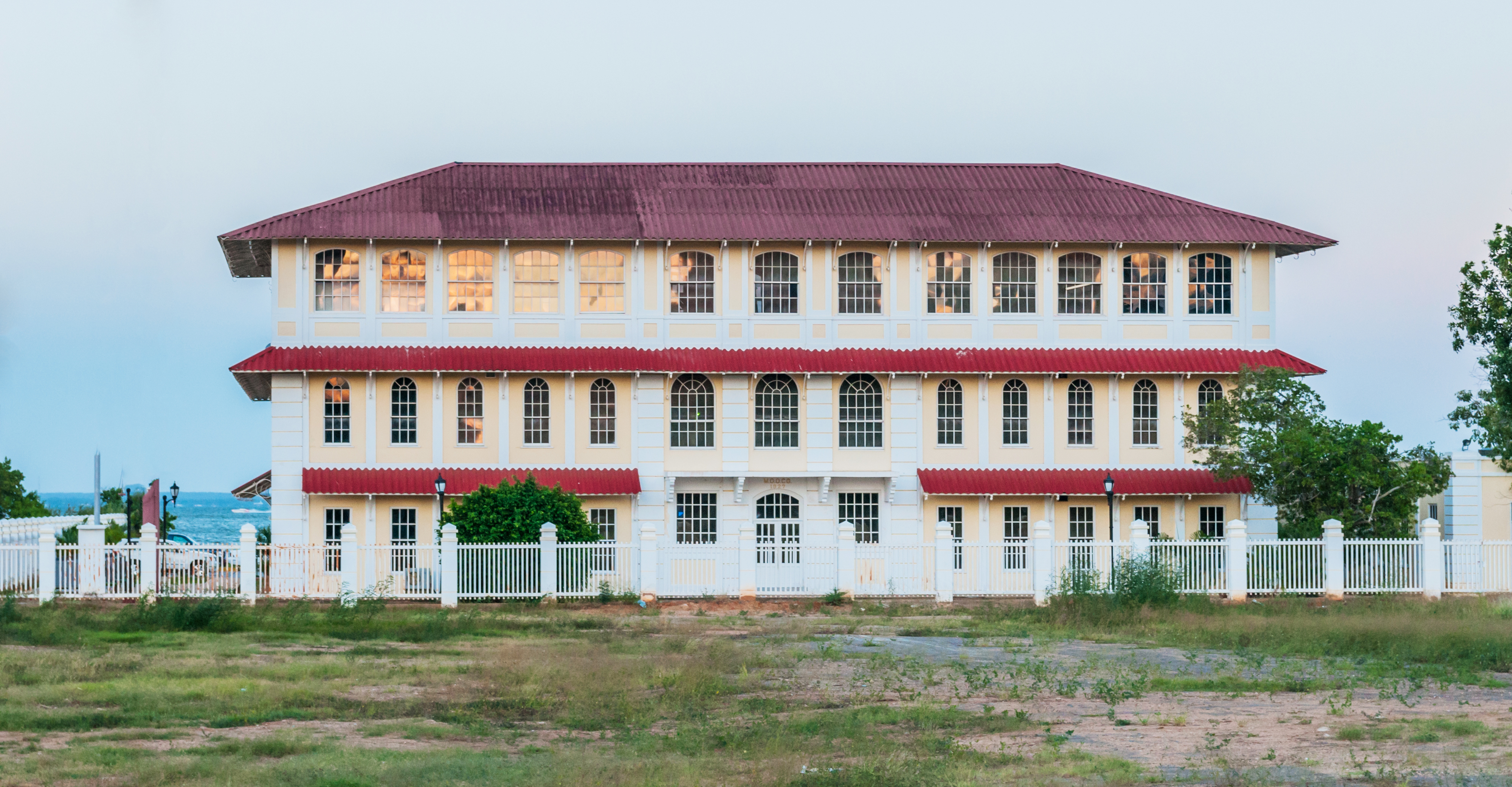
The main office of the Mene Grande Oil Company was built in 1951.

Despite the knowledge of the existence of oil in Venezuela, significant drilling started only in the early 1910s. In 1908, Juan Vicente Gómez replaced his ailing predecessor, Cipriano Castro, as the president of Venezuela. Over the next few years, Gómez granted several concessions to explore, produce, and refine oil. Most of these oil concessions were granted to his closest friends, and they in turn passed them on to foreign oil-companies that could actually develop them. One such concession was granted to Rafael Max Valladares, who contracted to General Asphalt for exploration and development of oil fields. The geologist Herbert Hoover, then in London as a consulting engineer for Gold Fields, Ltd. of South Africa, recommended the geologist Ralph Arnold to that company for a survey of oil resources in Venezuela. At that time there was a single oil-well in Venezuela producing 40 gallons of oil per day. Arnold's survey, conducted for Caribbean Petroleum Company (a subsidiary of General Asphalt Company) in Northern Venezuela, employed a staff of 52 geologists, engineers, and drillers. So successful was this venture that Royal Dutch Shell paid General Asphalt $1,000,000 for 51% in Caribbean Petroleum Company. On 15 April 1914, upon the completion of the Zumaque-I (now called MG-I) oil well, the first Venezuelan oilfield of importance, Mene Grande, was discovered by Caribbean Petroleum in the Maracaibo Basin. This major discovery encouraged a massive wave of foreign oil-companies to Venezuela in an attempt to gain a foothold in the burgeoning market.

From 1914 to 1917, several more oil fields were discovered across the country, including the emblematic Bolivar Coastal Field; however World War I (1914-1918) slowed the development of the industry significantly. Due to the difficulty in purchasing and transporting the necessary tools and machinery, some oil companies were forced to forego drilling until after the war. By the end of 1917, the first refining operations began at the San Lorenzo refinery to process the Mene Grande field production, and the first significant exports of Venezuelan oil by Caribbean Petroleum left from the San Lorenzo terminal. By the end of 1918, petroleum appeared for the first time on the Venezuelan export statistics at 21,194 metric tons.

It was the blowout of the Barroso No. 2 well in Cabimas in 1922 that marked the beginning of Venezuela's modern history as a major producer. This discovery captured the attention of the nation and the world. Soon dozens of foreign companies acquired vast tracts of territory in the hope of striking it rich, and by 1928 Venezuela had become the world's leading oil-exporter. Oil ended Venezuela's relative anonymity in the eyes of world powers, making it a linchpin of an ever-expanding international oil-industry and a new consideration in global policymaking.

Cabimas still plays an important role in production from the nation's largest oil fields, which are located around and beneath Lake Maracaibo. Other fields are increasing in importance, mainly in eastern Venezuela, where the Oficina Formation was discovered in 1937. About twenty years after the completion of the first oil-producing well Venezuela had become the largest oil exporter in the world and, after the United States, the second-largest oil-producer. Exports of oil boomed between 1920 and 1935. By the end of the 1930s, Venezuela had become the third-leading oil-producer in the world, behind the United States and the Soviet Union, as well as the leading exporter.

=== Growth of the oil industry ===
By 1929, the dramatic development of the Venezuela oil industry had begun to dominate all other economic sectors in the country, however, agricultural production began to decrease dramatically.

In the 1930s Germany, re-arming and industrialising under Hitler, depended on Venezuela for almost 50% of its petroleum imports, but this trade plumetted in 1939 following the imposition of the Allied blockade of Germany.

== 1940–1976 ==
Venezuela production of crude oil in Terawatt hours, 1965–2019

By 1940 Venezuela was the third largest producer of crude oil in the world with more than 27 million tonnes per year – just slightly less than the production in the USSR. In 1941, Isaías Medina Angarita, a former army general from the Venezuelan Andes, was indirectly elected president. One of his most important reforms during his tenure was the enactment of the new Hydrocarbons Law of 1943. This new law was the first major political step taken toward gaining more government control over its oil industry. Under the new law, the government and the oil companies share the oil wealth approximately 50-50. The new legal framework was reached amicably: oil companies had the choice to operate under the existing concession terms, or to agree to the less favourable terms, but for an extended period of time (40 years starting in 1943). Whereas the old concessions varied significantly, the new 40 year concessions were uniform for all concessionaires. The government revenue was generated from a land tax calculated per hectare and a royalty of 16 2/3 per cent of oil produced. The exemption from import duties for the oil companies was mostly revoked in an attempt to stimulate domestic economic growth in sectors that the oil industry depended on. Once passed, this piece of legislation basically remained unchanged until 1976, the year of nationalization, with only two partial revisions being made in 1955 and 1967.

In 1944, the Venezuelan government granted several new concessions encouraging the discovery of even more oil fields. This was mostly attributed to an increase in oil demand caused by an ongoing World War II, and by 1945, Venezuela was producing close to 1 million barrels per day (160,000 m^{3}/d).

Being an avid supplier of petroleum to the Allies of World War II, Venezuela had increased its production by 42 percent from 1943 to 1944 alone. Even after the war, oil demand continued to rise due to the fact that there was an increase from twenty-six million to forty million cars in service in the United States from 1945 to 1950.

By the mid-1950s, however, Middle Eastern countries had started contributing significant amounts of oil to the international petroleum market, and the United States had implemented oil import quotas. The world experienced an over-supply of oil, and prices plummeted.

=== Creation of OPEC ===
OPEC countries

In response to the chronically low oil prices of the mid and late 1950s, the Venezuelan hydrocarbons and mines minister Juan Pablo Pérez Alfonzo proposes to the oil producing countries Iran, Saudi Arabia, Iraq, and Kuwait met in Baghdad in September 1960 to form the Organization of the Petroleum Exporting Countries (OPEC). The main goal of the OPEC member countries was to work together in order to secure and stabilize international oil prices to ensure their interests as oil producing nations. This was managed largely via maintaining export quotas that helped prevent the overproduction of oil on an international scale.

=== Oil embargo of 1973 ===
In the early 1970s, oil producing countries of the Persian Gulf began negotiations with oil companies in attempt to increase their ownership participation. In 1972 they rapidly obtained a 25 percent participation, and less than a year later they revised those agreements to obtain up to 60 percent participation in the ownership of the companies. By 1973, OPEC Persian Gulf states members decided to raise their prices by 70 percent and to place an embargo on countries friendly to Israel (the United States and the Netherlands). This event became known as the 1973 oil crisis. Following a culmination of conflicts in the Middle East and the oil producing countries of the Persian Gulf no longer exporting to the United States and oil prices rising steeply, Venezuela experienced a significant increase in oil production profits. Between 1972 and 1974, the Venezuelan government revenues had quadrupled. With a new sense of confidence, Venezuelan president Carlos Andrés Pérez pledged that Venezuela would develop significantly within a few years. By substituting imports, subsidies, and protective tariffs, he planned to use oil profits to increase employment, fight poverty, increase income, and diversify the economy.

=== Nationalization ===
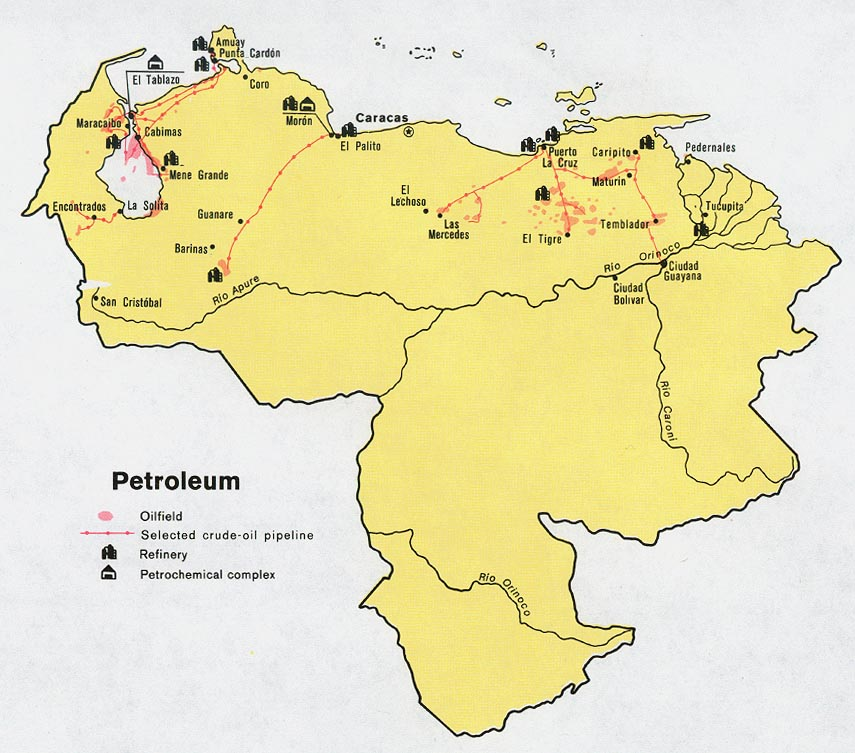
Petroleum map of Venezuela, 1972

Well before 1976, Venezuela had taken several steps in the direction of nationalization of its oil industry. In August 1971, under the presidency of Rafael Caldera, a law was passed that nationalized the country's natural gas industry. Also in 1971 the law of reversion was passed which stated that all the assets, plant, and equipment belonging to concessionaires within or outside the concession areas would revert to the nation without compensation upon the expiration of the concession. The movement towards nationalism was experienced once again under decree 832. Decree 832 stipulated that all exploration, production, refining, and sales programs of the oil companies had to be approved in advance by the Ministry of Mines and Hydrocarbons. Led by finance minister Luis Enrique Oberto, nationalization led to the Venezuelan economy reaching an average growth of 5% between 1970 and 1973.

Nationalization became official when the presidency of Carlos Andrés Pérez, whose economic plan, "La Gran Venezuela", called for the nationalization of the oil industry and diversification of the economy via import substitution. The country officially nationalized its oil industry on 1 January 1976 at the site of Zumaque Oil Well 1 (Mene Grande), and along with it came the birth of Petróleos de Venezuela S.A. (PDVSA) which is the Venezuelan state-owned petroleum company. All foreign oil companies that once did business in Venezuela were replaced by Venezuelan companies. Each of the former concessionaires was simply substituted by a new "national" oil company, which maintained the structures and functions of its multi-national corporation (MNC)-predecessor.

All the new companies are owned by a holding company, Petroven or PDV, which in turn is owned by the state. Ultimately not much had changed in this regard, as all Venezuelans with leading positions in the MNCs took over the leading positions of the respective new companies, and therefore still securing their interests in Venezuela's oil. PDVSA controls activity involving oil and natural gas in Venezuela.

== 1977–1998 ==
After the 1973 oil crisis, the period of economic prosperity for Venezuela was relatively short-lived. As Venezuelan oil minister and OPEC co-founder Juan Pablo Pérez Alfonzo had presciently warned in 1976: "Ten years from now, twenty years from now, you will see, oil will bring us ruin... It is the devil's excrement." This was the case during the "1980s oil glut". OPEC member countries were not adhering strictly to their assigned quotas, and once again oil prices plummeted.

=== Mid-1980s and 1990s ===
During the mid-1980s, Venezuela's oil production steadily began to rise. Between 1990 and 1999, Venezuela's industrial production declined from 50 percent to 24 percent of the country's gross domestic product compared to a decrease of 36 percent to 29 percent for the rest of Latin America, but oil production levels continued to rise until 1998.

However, the efficiency of Petróleos de Venezuela S.A. (PDVSA) was brought into question over the years. During 1976–1992, the amount of PDVSA's income that went towards the company's costs was on average 29 percent leaving a remainder of 71 percent for the government. From 1993 to 2000, however, that distribution almost completely reversed, to where 64 percent of PDVSA's income were kept by PDVSA, leaving a remainder of only 36 percent for the government. This change in government revenue was due to a change in accounting methods, lower taxation on private investment, higher production of oil sands, and transfer pricing.

== 1999–2023 ==
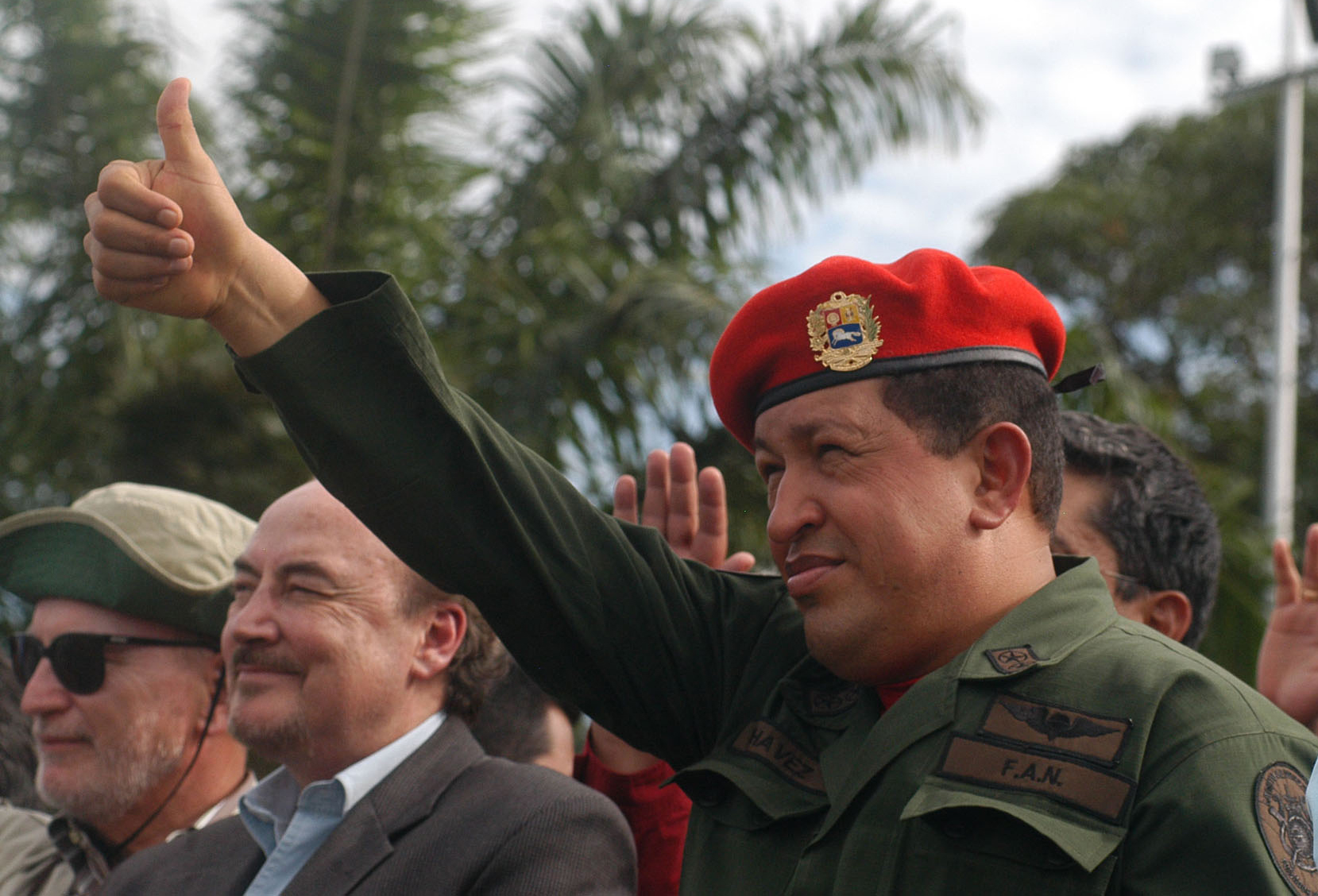
Former Venezuelan President Hugo Chávez

"There is no question that Venezuela under Chávez came to experience one of the worst cases of Dutch Disease in the world."

— Foreign Policy

After Hugo Chávez took office in February 1999, several policy changes involving the country's oil industry were made to explicitly tie it to the state under the Bolivarian Revolution. Petróleos de Venezuela S.A. (PDVSA) had not demonstrated any capability to bring new oil fields on-stream since nationalizing heavy oil projects in the Orinoco Petroleum Belt formerly operated by international oil companies ExxonMobil, ConocoPhillips, Chevron.

The Chávez government used PDVSA resources to fund social programmes, and PDVSA staff were required to support Chávez. His social policies resulted in overspending that caused shortages in Venezuela and allowed the inflation rate to grow to one of the highest rates in the world. The American political scientist Javier Corrales described the Venezuelan oil policies under Chavez as an example of the Dutch Disease, a term used in economics to describe a situation in a nation's economy when the development of one sector of the economy that is particularly prosperous leads to the underdevelopment of other important sectors of the economy.

According to Corrales and Penfold, "Chávez was not the first president in Venezuelan history to be mesmerized by the promise of oil, but he was the one who allowed the sector to decline the most", with most statistics showing deterioration of the industry since the beginning of his presidency.

Chávez's successor, Nicolás Maduro, continued much of the policies championed by Chávez, with Venezuela further deteriorating as a result of continuing such policies.

=== Reinforcement of OPEC ===
From the beginning of his presidency, Chávez took an active role in OPEC and sought to increase international oil prices.

In March 1999, at a meeting of the heads of OPEC nations, a 3% cutback in oil supplies was agreed to. The meeting could be considered a success given the record high oil prices of the following years, but much of that is also a consequence of the 11 September 2001 attacks against the United States, the Iraq War, and the significant increase in demand for oil from developing economies like China and India, which helped prompt a surge in oil prices to levels far higher than those targeted by OPEC during the preceding period. In addition to these events, the December 2002 oil strike in Venezuela, which resulted in a loss of almost 3mmbpd of crude oil production, brought a sharp increase in world prices of crude.

=== Enabling act laws and controversy ===
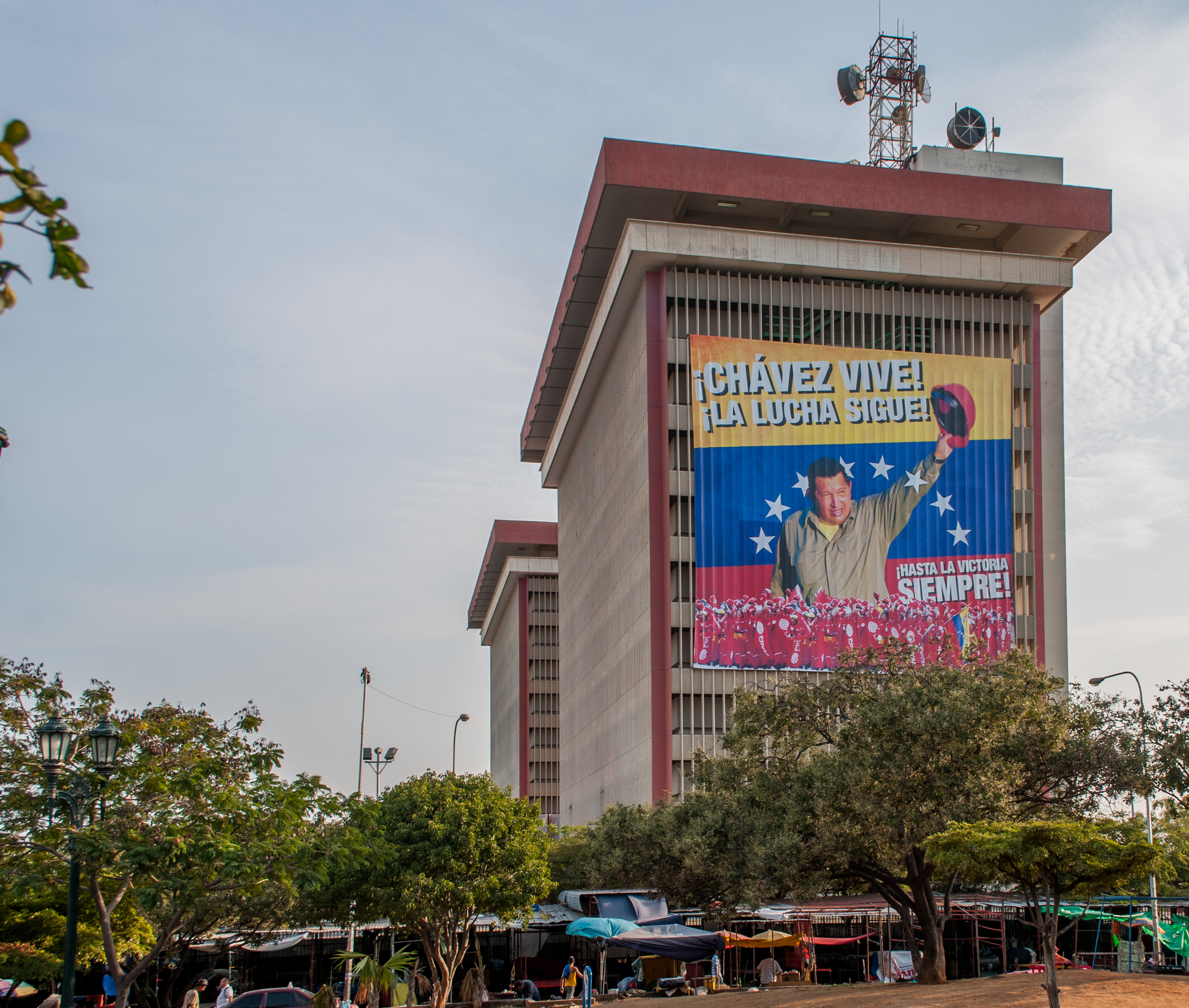
Bolivarian propaganda supporting Chávez on the PDVSA Towers in Maracaibo

In 2000, the pro-Chávez National Assembly granted Chávez the ability to rule by decree due to the poor economic conditions. On 13 November 2001 while ruling by decree, Chávez enacted the new Hydrocarbons Law, which came into effect in January 2002. The laws "marked a turning point in public sentiment toward the president" with both chavistas and anti-chavistas outraged at the changes. For the opposition to Chávez, such dramatic changes to the government proved to them that Chávez was a "dictator-in-training".

Chávez began setting goals of reinstating quotas, such as ten percent of PDVSA's annual investment budget was to be spent on social programs. Chavez initiated many of these major changes to exert more control over PDVSA and efficiently deal with the problems he and his supporters had over PDVSA's small revenue contributions to the government. By 2002, warnings grew of the Chávez overspending on social programs in order to maintain populist support.

In December 2002, PDVSA went on strike creating a near-complete halt on oil production in Venezuela. The aim of the Venezuelan general strike of 2002-2003 was to pressure Chávez into resigning and calling early elections. The strike lasted approximately two and a half months, and the government ended up firing 12,000 PDVSA employees and replacing them with workers loyal to the Chávez government, many of whom came out of retirement to replace the fired. By January 2002, protests involving hundreds of thousands of Venezuelans opposing Chávez became common in Venezuela. In April 2002, mass demonstrations occurred in Caracas and Chávez was temporarily overthrown by the military, during the 2002 Venezuelan coup d'état attempt.

=== International deals ===
In 2005, PDVSA opened its first office in China, and announced plans to nearly triple its fleet of oil tankers in that region. Chávez had long stated that he would like to sell more Venezuelan oil to China so his country could become more independent of the United States. In 2007, Chávez struck a deal with Brazilian oil company Petrobras to build an oil refinery in northeastern Brazil where crude oil will be sent from both Brazil and Argentina. A similar deal was struck with Ecuador where Venezuela agreed to refine 100,000 barrels (16,000 m^{3}) of crude oil from Ecuador at discount prices. Cuba agreed to let thousands of Venezuelans be received for medical treatment and health programs, and in turn, Venezuela agreed to sell several thousands of barrels to Cuba at a 40% discount under Petrocaribe program.

=== Oil and public policy ===
The Chávez administration used high oil prices in the 2000s on his populist policies and to gain support from voters. The social works initiated by Chávez's government relied on oil products, the keystone of the Venezuelan economy, with Chávez's administration policy distorting other economic sectors as a result.

According to Cannon, the state income from oil revenue grew "from 51% of total income in 2000 to 56% 2006"; oil exports increased "from 77% in 1997 [...] to 89% in 2006"; and his administration's dependence on petroleum sales was "one of the chief problems facing the Chávez government". By 2008, exports of everything but oil "collapsed" and in 2012, the World Bank explained that Venezuela's economy is "extremely vulnerable" to changes in oil prices since in 2012 "96% of the country's exports and nearly half of its fiscal revenue" relied on oil production.

Economists say that the Venezuelan government's overspending on social programs and strict business policies contributed to imbalances in the country's economy, contributing to rising inflation, poverty, low healthcare spending and shortages in Venezuela going into the final years of his presidency.

Since 2014, oil production in Venezuela has suffered from a poor oil market and Venezuela's insufficient funding of the industry. Venezuela's nationalistic oil policies have not succeeded in making them more independent from their oil customers. In 2016, the United States imported 291,461,000 barrels of oils from Venezuela, an amount consistent with imports in the five years prior. To assuage the oil price decline which began back in June 2014 and continues through to today, President Maduro printed more currency, resulting in inflation as high as 700% of what the inflation rate was in 2014. The Economic policy of the Nicolás Maduro administration did not revive the oil decline, and by 2016, the oil production reached the lowest it had been in 23 years. According to analysts, the economic crisis suffered under President Nicolás Maduro would have still occurred with or without Chávez.

In 2017, PDVSA was unable to export oil through international water, which requires safety inspections and cleaning under maritime law, with a fleet of tankers stranded in the Caribbean Sea due to the issue. In July 2017, this arrangement was extended from just the first half of 2017 to continue until March 2018. This continued depression in income from oil led Maduro in July 2017 to pressure the OPEC cartel to make policy changes on members that might raise the falling world oil price, in order to help the Venezuelan economy. In April 2017, a controversial Venezuelan Supreme Court ruling granted Maduro executive powers over PDVSA, which allow him act autonomously in selling shares or make international agreements for the state-owned oil company. In October 2017, Venezuela had its lowest oil output in 28 years, with only 1.863 million bpd being pumped that month. By late-2017, PDVSA struggled to repay $725 million of debt, part of a total $5 billion owed.

In August 2017, the Trump administration imposed sanctions aimed at PDVSA. While these initial sanctions were mainly aimed to block the company's access to US financial markets, later sanctions extended restrictions to prohibit all trade between companies under US jurisdiction and PDVSA. By 2020, sanctions had halted oil trade between the US and Venezuela.

During the Biden administration, the U.S. Department of the Treasury's Office of Foreign Assets Control (OFAC) lifted sanctions in October 2023 for six-months to allow limited trade with the U.S. to resume.

=== Recovery efforts ===
Beginning in 2020 Iran began assisting Venezuela with maintenance and repair of refining facilities. As of 2022 Iranian state firms were negotiating to repair Venezuela's largest refinery complex, the Paraguaná Refinery Complex which has a capacity of 955,000 barrels per day.

== 2025–present ==
=== Background ===
Following the 7 August 2025 United States Department of Justice raising the reward for the arrest of Venezuelan president Nicolás Maduro to US$50 million. on 10 December 2025, the U.S. Coast Guard seized the oil tanker Skipper in international waters, off the Venezuelan coast. This was part of a series of escalating actions to put pressure on the political regime of Nicolas Maduro. The vessel was boarded by armed Coast Guard personnel who descended from a helicopter. The operation was executed after a U.S. Federal judge authorized the seizure due to the tankers role in transporting sanctioned oil from Venezuela and Iran. Maduro had previously been indicted by a US federal court in 2020 and is accused of narcoterrorism and conspiracy to import cocaine to the United States.

=== U.S. naval blockade ===
On 16 December 2025, U.S. President Trump announced a complete and total naval blockade of all sanctioned oil tankers going into and out of Venezuela.

=== US-Venezuela oil deals and ease of sanctions ===
In the aftermath of the apprehension and capture of President Nicolás Maduro on 3 January 2026, U.S. president Trump stated in a press conference on the same day that the US government would operate and control the Venezuelan oil industry "until such time as we can do a safe, proper and judicious transition". However, the US Secretary of State subsequently said that the US will not govern Venezuela and that the "oil quarantine" will continue.

In January 2026, two special licenses were issued by the U.S. to oil traders Vitol (headquartered in Geneva), and Trafigura (headquartered in Singapore), permitting the companies to negotiate sales and to export Venezuelan oil. Both companies took immediate steps to begin export of Venezuela's oil. On 14 January, the United States Department of Energy announced that the United States had completed their first sales of Venezuelan oil valued at $500 million as part of a $2 billion deal between United States and Venezuela governments. On 15 January, acting president Delcy Rodríguez announced that she was submitting a reform to the country's hydrocarbon law to "allow [foreign] investment flows to be incorporated into new fields, fields where no investment has ever been made and into fields where there is no infrastructure." On 20 January, Delcy Rodríguez confirmed having received the first $300 million. She announced the money will go to the exchange market in Venezuela, the national banks and the central bank.

On 23 January, the first cargo of 460,000 barrels of naphtha by Vitol, necessary to deal with the heavy crude oil, arrived to Venezuela in a deal with between United States and Venezuela. Before that last cargo was received in December by Chevron Corporation in an agreement with the United States as the United States blockade had stopped many suppliers.

On 27 January, Delcy Rodríguez announced that the United States was unfreezing various funds related to 2019 oil sanctions on Venezuela. The next day, Reuters announced that a US refiner, Citgo, bought Venezuelan oil for the first time since 2019.

On 29 January, the US Treasury’s Office of Foreign Assets Control lifted various oil-related sanctions imposed on Venezuela, authorizing US companies to buy, sell, transport, store and refine Venezuelan crude oil. US sanctions on production of oil were not lifted. Trump administration also announced that additional sanctions will be lifted soon.

In February 2026, Venezuela’s government suspended 19 production-sharing agreements made during the Maduro administration with private oil companies. Ownership of the oil remains with Venezuela for the new companies extracting the oil.

In July 2026, Joaquin Castro, a Democrat, claimed that the invasion had been about graft and that the money was "controlled by the Trump administration without transparency". María Elvira Salazar, a republican, called for reports on the US-run oil sales to be made public.

== Gallery ==
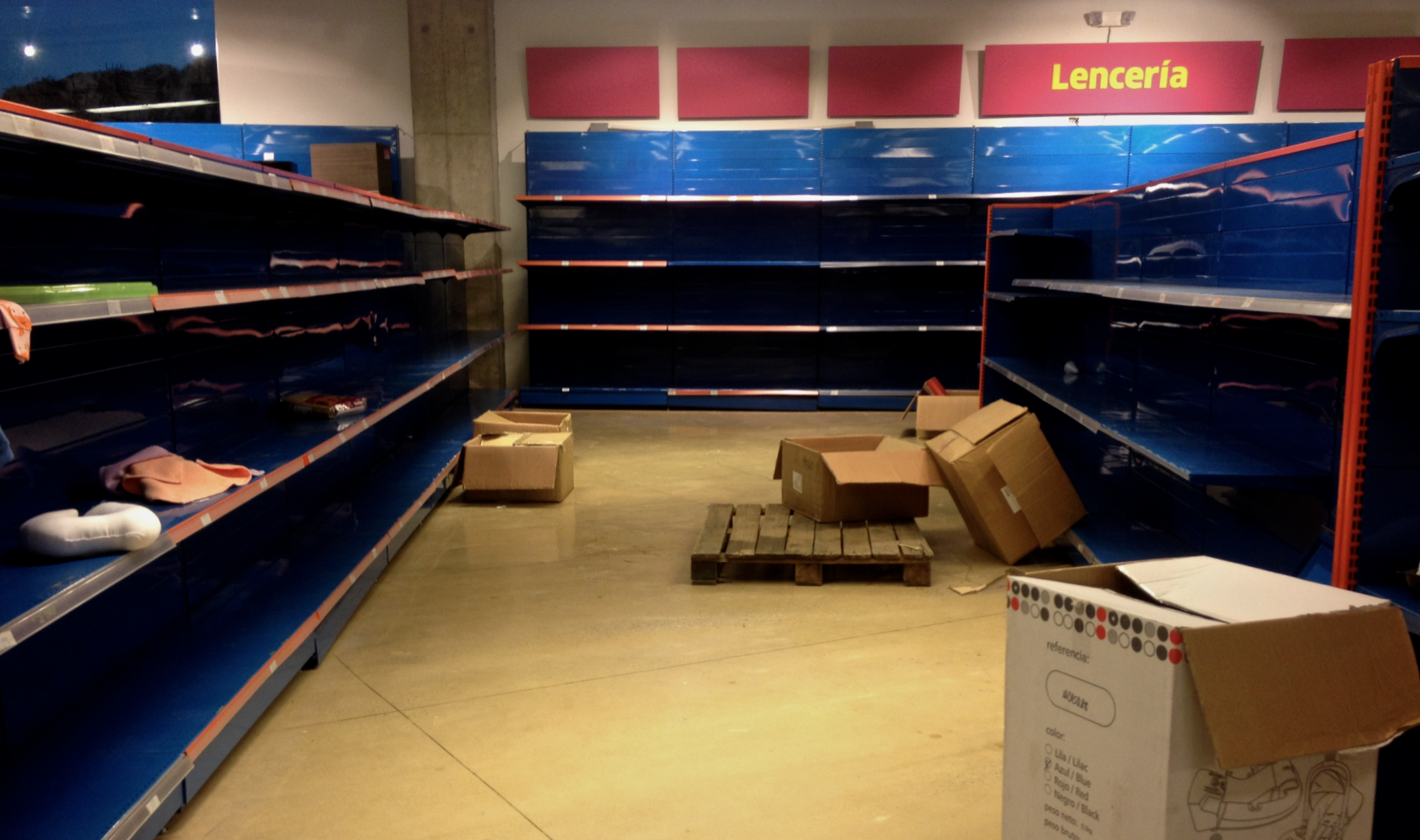
Shortages leave shelves empty in a Venezuelan store

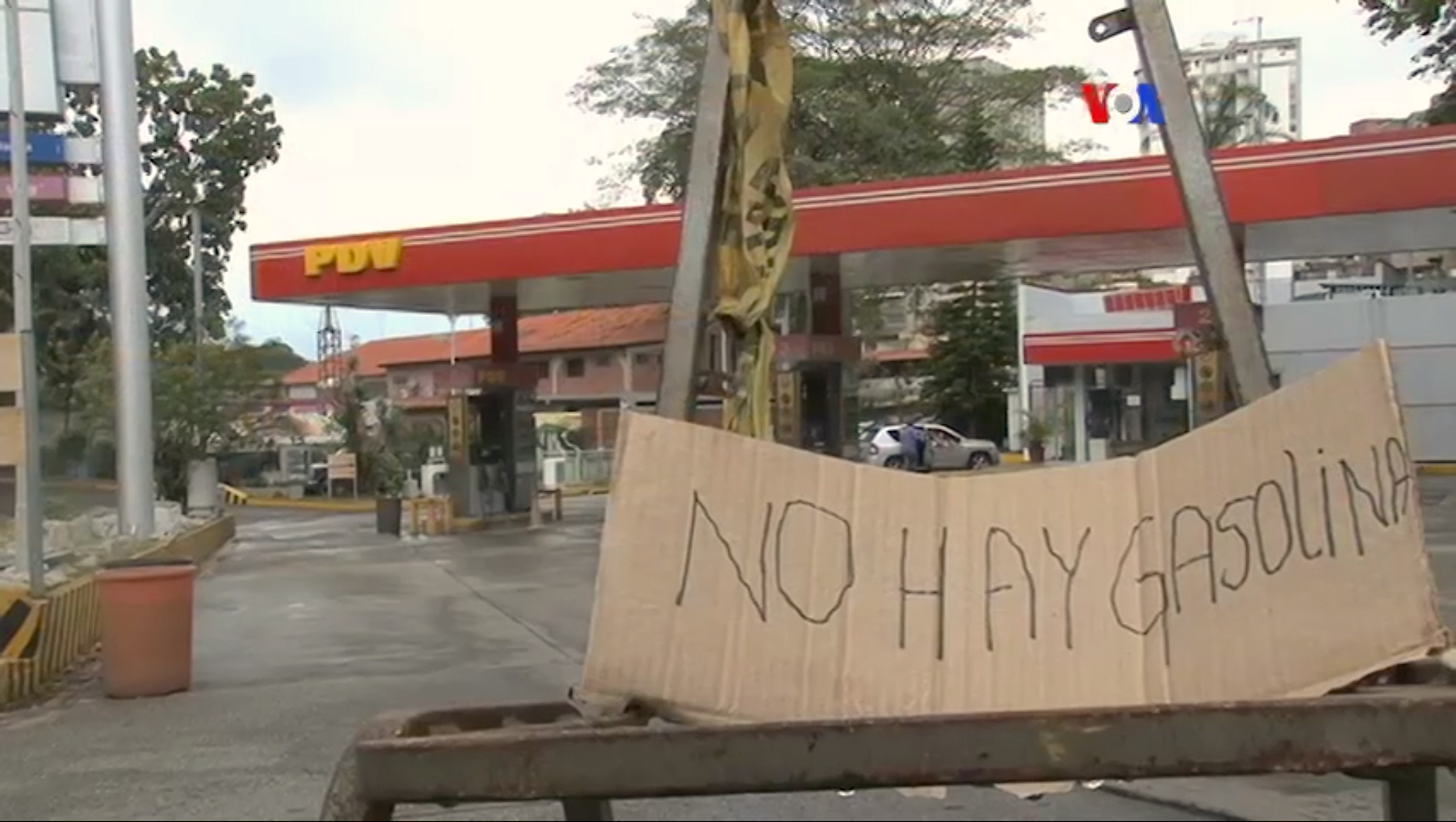
Shortages of gasoline in Venezuela in March 2017

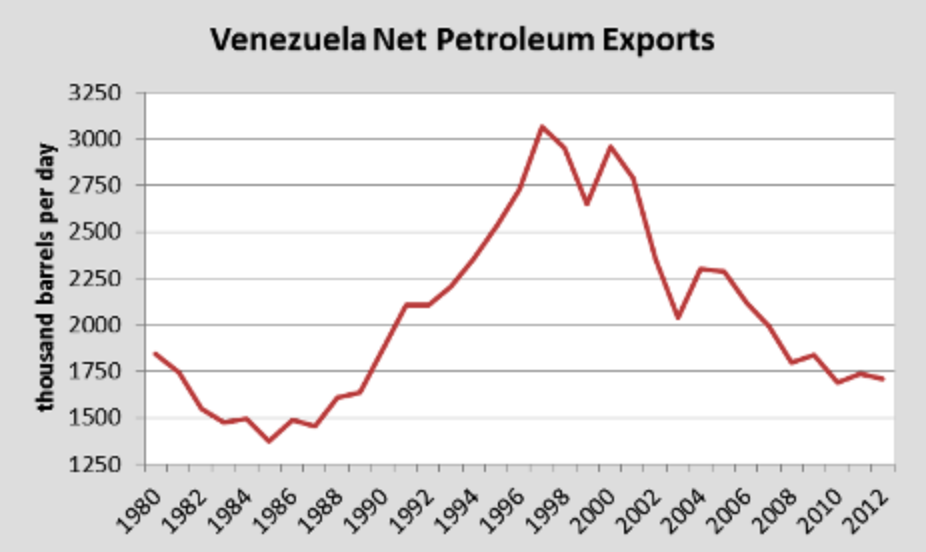
Venezuela's yearly petroleum exports demonstrating the recent and continued decline in exportation

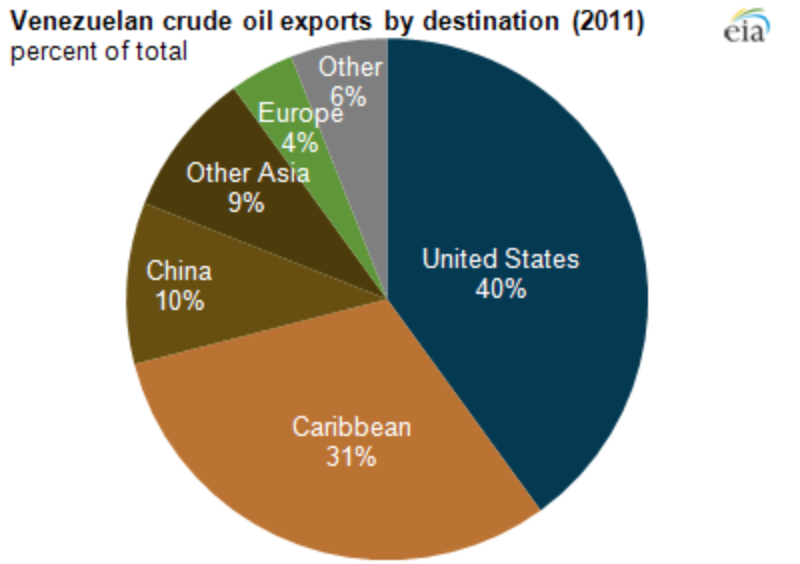
Figure depicting Venezuelan exports and the interdependence between the U.S. and Venezuela

== See also ==
- Corporación Trebol Gas C.A.
- History of U.S. involvement in Venezuela's petroleum industry
- Oil reserves in Venezuela
- U.S. energy security and Venezuela

== General references ==
- Painter, David S. (2012). "Oil and the American Century". The Journal of American History. 99 (1): 24–39. doi:10.1093/jahist/jas073.
- Randall, Laura (1987). The Political Economy of Venezuelan Oil. New York, NY: Praeger. ISBN 978-0-275-92823-0.
