= Belarus–Venezuela relations =

Belarus–Venezuela relations relations

- Venezuela: Belarus

Relations between Belarus and Venezuela were formally established on February 4, 1997. Both countries recognized each other five years earlier on January 11, 1992.

Belarus has an embassy in Caracas and Venezuela has an embassy in Minsk. Both countries are members of the Non-Aligned Movement.

== History ==
Relations between Belarus and Venezuela were formally established on February 4, 1997. Both countries recognized each other five years earlier on January 11, 1992. The first head of state to visit Belarus from Venezuela is Hugo Chavez in the form of a official state-level visit in July 23-25, 2006, and likewise to visit Venezuela from Belarus is Alexandr Lukashenko, also in the form of an official state-level visit one year after in December 6-9, 2007.

== Military relations ==
Group of Belarusian military specialists in Venezuela
- Active: 2008—2013
- Country: Belarus
- Allegiance: Department of International Military Cooperation of the Ministry of Defense of the Republic of Belarus
- Type: Military specialists of Belarus
- Role: assistance in the creation of a unified air defense and electronic warfare system
- Size: from 10 or more people
- Garrison/HQ: Venezuela

Commanders
- Current commander: Oleg Paferov

In 2006, Venezuelan President Hugo Chávez publicly stated that his country needed modern air defense systems to cover the air borders from the Caribbean coast to the border with Brazil.

As Belarusian president Alexander Lukashenko recalled later, the Venezuelans needed help reorganizing the army. They bought various air defense systems, airplanes and other weapons, but did not have a good military school to use all this. Deputy Chief of the General Staff of the Belarusian Army Pyotr Tikhanovsky noted that there was no unified air defense system in Venezuela, there were only separate units.

In December 2007, the leaders of the two countries signed an agreement in Caracas to supply Venezuela with two unified command centers, one for air defense and the other for electronic warfare. Its validity was for five years, but automatically extendable for equal periods until one of the parties denounces it one year in advance. It also contemplated the delivery to Venezuela of technologies for manufacturing military equipment, its maintenance and repair. In April 2008, the Parliament of Belarus ratified the agreement. According to the agreements of 2007, the activity of Belarusians was designed for five years. At the same time, the agreement was supposed to be automatically extended for another five years. The military presence of Belarus could be suspended at the request of one of the parties.

The group of military specialists was headed by general Oleg Paferov. Later he became the ambassador of Belarus to Venezuela.

The first ten military consultants arrived in Venezuela in 2008. Their families also arrived with the specialists. Over time, the contingent increased.

=== Activity ===
Belarusian advisers offered Venezuela a project of systemic protection of the state. He meant the organization of an integrated defense complex, including air defense, electronic warfare, and counteraction to precision weapons. It was necessary to build a new defense system, install existing weapons in it and purchase the necessary new ones while explaining everything to the Venezuelan colleagues. Based on the proposals of military consultants, the Venezuelan army acquired automated air defense and Air Force command and control systems, Belarusian-made radar and electronic warfare equipment, as well as air defense systems.

Within the framework of the program for the protection of especially important objects on the territory of Venezuela created the bases of the deployment of the Tor and Pechora-2M air defense systems. The Venezuelan authorities have signed contracts with military enterprises not only of Belarus but also of Russia, China, and Iran.

== Presidential relations ==
In July 2008, Hugo Chávez visited Belarus, called Lukashenko his "brother," praised their shared opposition to U.S influence, signed an oil deal, and gave him a "Friendship of Nations" award.

On 6 March 2013, following the death of Chávez, Aleksandr Lukashenko publicly expressed deep condolences, describing Chávez as a close and trusted friend, participating in his funeral. Lukashenko praised Chávez as a leader devoted to Venezuela’s independence and prosperity, and considered the strong bond between the two nations.

Both Chávez and Lukashenko were frequently criticized by the Western world, which labeled Lukashenko as "Europe's last dictator." Chávez remarked on their shared portrayal as authoritarian figures, asserting that their opposition to Western dominance and advocacy for national sovereignty were the reasons for their demonization.

Lukashenko consistently praised Chávez’s efforts to free Venezuela from foreign intervention and defend the marginalized, describing him as a symbol of hope and democracy in South America. He pledged to honor Chávez’s legacy by continuing joint projects and deepening bilateral cooperation.

When Nicolás Maduro was elected President of Venezuela in April 2013, Lukashenko promptly congratulated him, expressing strong support and Belarus’s "happiness" for Venezuela’s continued path towards "peace, democracy, and progress". Lukashenko also extended an invitation for Maduro to visit Belarus, aiming to further strengthen their strategic partnership.

In October 2017, Maduro visited Belarus to expand military cooperation and discussed trade in energy, agriculture, and construction.

In January 2019, during the Venezuelan presidential crisis, Lukashenko reaffirmed Belarus’s commitment to Venezuela’s sovereignty, calling for a peaceful resolution to internal tensions firmly rejecting external interference, whilst sustaining Maduro.

In August 2020, Maduro congratulated Lukashenko on his re-election as Belarusian president, further illustrating the reciprocal nature of their diplomatic support.

In July 2024, Lukashenko officially congratulated Maduro on his re-election, reiterating Belarus’s support for Venezuela’s sovereignty and the continuation of joint projects. He esteemed the shared values of freedom, justice, and mutual assistance, mentioning the resilience of both nations in the face of external challenges.

The leaders have often marked significant national occasions with messages of solidarity and proposals for future cooperation. During Venezuela’s Independence Day celebrations in July 2025, Maduro proposed a World Summit for Peace, featuring the countries’ ongoing commitment to global dialogue and collaboration.

== Economic relations ==
=== Formation of the strategic alliance ===
On 25 July 2006, Hugo Chávez and Alexander Lukashenko formalized a "Strategic Alliance" through the signing of seven cooperation agreements in Minsk. These agreements sought to enhance bilateral collaboration across multiple sectors, notably petrochemicals and energy, agriculture, military-technical industries, mining, and trade. The alliance was established in a shared anti-U.S stance to support a multipolar world order diversifying Venezuela’s economic and geopolitical partnerships.

=== Economic and financial cooperation ===
On 2 August 2007, Belarus settled a gas debt to Russia, aided by financial support from Venezuela. Lukashenko acknowledged that Chávez had offered credit on favorable terms, and noted that Western banks were also prepared to provide assistance. At the time, Russia’s Gazprom had threatened to reduce gas supplies to Belarus by nearly half unless a $456 million debt was repaid promptly. After two years, Belarus and Venezuela signed 24 cooperative agreements, signaling a commitment to further deepen commercial and strategic ties.

=== Expansion of joint ventures and industrial projects ===
During a state visit to Venezuela on 8 December 2007, Presidents Lukashenko and Chávez signed major agreements, including the creation of a joint oil company "Petrolera BeloVenezolana" (PDVSA 60% and Belorusneft 40%) to operate in the Orinoco Belt. Additional agreements were made to establish factories for trucks, tractors, and auto parts, reinforcing the strategic partnership and mutual resistance against U.S influence.

Since 2007, the partnership included energy, construction, agriculture, and industrial development. Belarus has constructed four major plants in Venezuela for the production of ceramic blocks, tractors, municipal vehicles, and road-building machinery. Notable joint ventures include "MAZVEN" (MAZ truck assembly), "Venezolano-Minsk Tractors" (Belarus tractor assembly), and "Makinarias Barinas" (heavy machinery production).

=== Energy sector ===
The joint venture Petrolera Belovenezolana, launched in 2007, has operated in seven oil fields and six gas fields, generating approximately $70 million for Belarus. Between 2008 and 2016, the venture produced over 8.4 million tons of oil and 6.4 billion cubic meters of gas, mainly in Lake Maracaibo and eastern Venezuela.

=== Housing and construction ===
The Belarusian company Belsarubezhstroy was one of the companies that assisted the most during the Great Mission Housing Venezuela program, executing contracts for planning nearly 20,000 apartments and constructing one of Latin America’s largest brick factory.

=== Agricultural development ===
In 2010, Belarus provided agricultural machinery and technical assistance to Venezuela, supporting rural development and the establishment of agro-industrial towns based on the Belarusian model. These initiatives were weakened by the crisis in Venezuela.

=== Political and diplomatic relations ===
Venezuela has expressed intentions to double its trade balance with Belarus. Lukashenko has reiterated Belarus’s support for Venezuela, emphasizing the reliability of their partnership. High-level visits and diplomatic exchanges, including those involving Russian leadership have positively influenced the alliance.

=== Challenges and criticisms ===
The partnership was criticized particularly from the United States, which has denounced the potential destabilization and armed conflicts in South America resulting from Venezuela’s military buildup and alleged support for Marxist insurgent groups in neighboring Colombia.

In the housing sector, the National Assembly of Venezuela has condemned a reported corruption scheme involving the Great Mission Housing Venezuela in which Belzarubezhstroy received payments for thousands of apartments but out of approximately 20,000 planned apartments, fewer than 8,000 were completed, with significant cost overruns.

A 2023 joint investigation by the OCCRP, the Belarusian Investigative Center and Armando.info have revealed widespread corruption, mismanagement, and lack of accountability after Belarus failed to pay Venezuela $1.4 billion under a 2010 oil contract, resulting in substantial losses and unfulfilled commitments. This was confirmed by Rafael Ramírez, who headed the Ministry of Oil and Mining under Chávez. The oil trade, initially seen as a cornerstone of the alliance, ultimately led to debt accumulation and the cessation of Venezuelan oil deliveries to Belarus after 2012.

=== Recent developments and ongoing cooperation ===
Both nations express intent to strengthen bilateral relations. Official talks in Minsk in October 2017 reaffirmed the strategic importance of the partnership. At the 16th BRICS summit in Kazan in October 2024, Lukashenko announced the development of a new roadmap for cooperation, focusing on joint projects and trade. Maduro claimed was committed to collaborate along the ideological lines established by Hugo Chávez and Simón Bolívar.

Belarus and Venezuela have issued joint declarations supporting industrial development and reaffirming their dedication to multilateral alignment. The Development Bank of Belarus maintained Belarusian exports to Venezuela, and high-level meetings have continued to coordinate trade, political, and cultural agendas.

== See also ==
- Foreign relations of Belarus
- Foreign relations of Venezuela
