= Corporación Trebol Gas C.A. =

Privately owned Venezuelan oil company

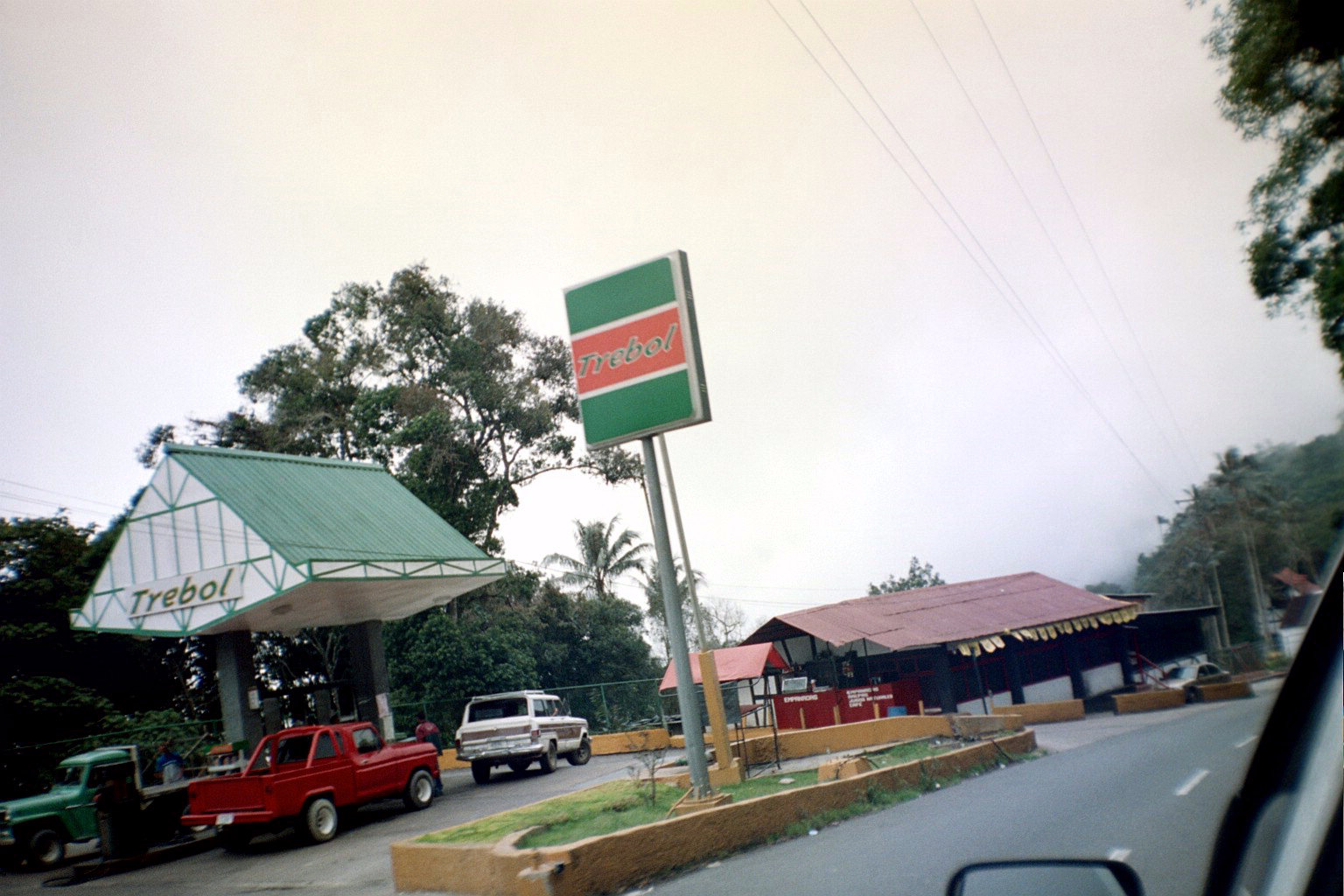
Trebol gas station in Caracas.

Corporación Trebol Gas C.A. was a Venezuelan privately owned oil company reporting 280 gas stations located in every state of the country and about 16% of the oil distribution market in Venezuela. Trebol was founded in 1998 and is a chain of gas stations, each operated by a franchisee. Almost every gas station has a convenience store and sells Venoco lubricants. Under Luis Garmendia administration the company suffered misdirection and fraud, having been removed as CEO of the organization. The company's president Domingo Negrín has been a leading lobbyist for increasing the price of gasoline in Venezuela, one of the world's cheapest.
