= Chinh–Hunnicutt affair =

1966 scandal regarding U.S. military advisors and the Vietnam War

The Chinh–Hunnicutt affair, referred to in the Pentagon Papers, was a 1966 scandal concerning the proper role of U.S. military advisors during the Vietnam War. Colonel Cecil F. Hunnicutt, the senior advisor to the ARVN 25th Division, was accused of misusing his position for:

...trying to have the CG removed, of attempting to dismiss other division officers, of bypassing the chain of command, and of destroying the "spirit of cooperation between Americans and Vietnamese."
