= Oil reserves in Venezuela =

Oil reserves located in Venezuela

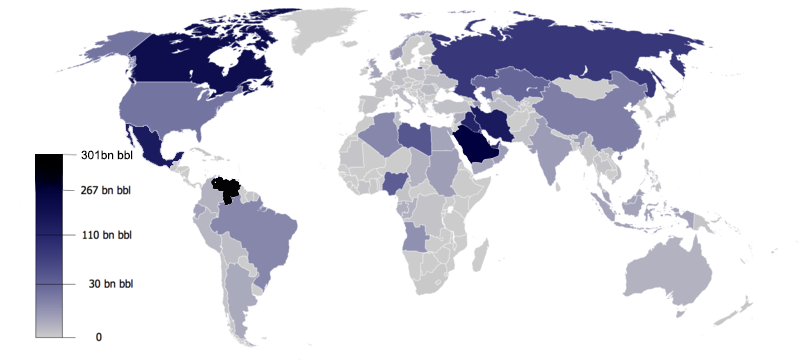
A map of world oil reserves according to OPEC, 2013

Venezuela's proven crude oil reserves are estimated to be the most plentiful of any nation.

The proven oil reserves in Venezuela are recognized as the largest in the world, totaling 300 billion barrels (4.8×10^{10} m^{3}) as of 1 January 2014, though some believe those numbers to be inflated.

Venezuela's crude oil is very heavy by international standards, and as a result much of it must be processed by specialized domestic and international refineries.

== History ==
Venezuela's development of its oil reserves has been affected by political unrest. In late 2002, nearly half of the workers at the state oil company PDVSA went on strike, after which the company fired 18,000 of them, draining the company of technical knowledge and expertise.

=== Growth ===
As of 2006, Venezuela was one of the largest suppliers of oil to the United States, sending about 1.4 million barrels per day (220×10^{3} m^{3}/d) to the U.S.

In October 2007, the Venezuelan government said its proven oil reserves was 100 billion barrels (16×10^{9} m^{3}). The energy and oil ministry said it had certified an additional 12.4 billion barrels (2.0×10^{9} m^{3}) of proven reserves in the country's Faja del Orinoco region. In February 2008, Venezuelan proven oil reserves were 172 billion barrels (27×10^{9} m^{3}). By 2009, Venezuela reported 211.17 billion barrels (3.3573×10^{10} m^{3}) of conventional oil reserves, the largest of any country in South America. When 2015 ended, Venezuela's confirmed oil reserves were estimated to be around 300.9 billion barrels in total.

In 2008, it had net oil exports of 1.189 MMbbl/d (189,000 m^{3}/d) to the United States. As a result of the lack of transparency in the country's accounting, Venezuela's true level of oil production is difficult to determine, but OPEC analysts estimate that it produced around 2.47 MMbbl/d (393,000 m^{3}/d) of oil in 2009, which would give it 234 years of remaining production at current rates. In 2010 Venezuela reportedly produced 3.1 million barrels of oil daily and exporting 2.4 million of those barrels per day. Such oils exports brought in $61 billion for Venezuela. However, Venezuela only owned about $10.5 billion in foreign reserves, meaning that its debt remained at $7.2 billion in 2015.

=== Collapse ===
After the 2014 oil crash, "Venezuela descended into chaos with hyperinflation, severe shortages of most goods, fighting on the streets, and many people fleeing to other countries." Venezuela owned the Citgo gasoline chain, but U.S. sanctions as of 2019 prevent Venezuela from receiving economic benefit from Citgo. In 2019, it was among the oil export countries who had lost the most from energy transition; it was ranked 151 out of 156 countries in the index of Geopolitical Gains and Losses (GeGaLo).

Venezuela's oil exports were "expected to net about $2.3 billion" by the end of 2020, whereas a decade earlier the country had been "the largest producer in Latin America, earning about $90 billion a year" from these exports. A New York Times article noted that, in October 2020, "for the first time in a century, there are no rigs searching for oil in Venezuela."

=== 2026 United States intervention in Venezuela ===
On 3 January 2026, the United States launched a military strike in Venezuela and captured incumbent Venezuelan president Nicolás Maduro and his wife, Cilia Flores.

== Orinoco Belt ==
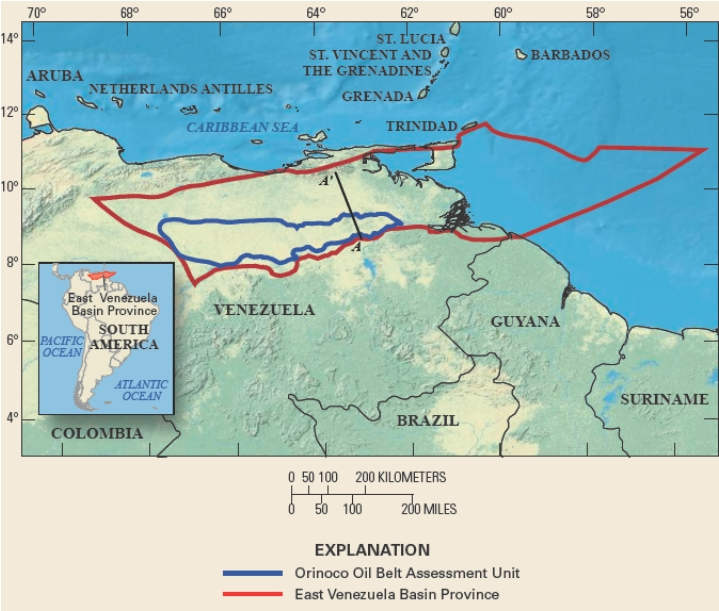
Orinoco Belt assessment unit, USGS

In addition to conventional oil, Venezuela has oil sands deposits similar in size to those of Canada, and approximately equal to the world's reserves of conventional oil. Venezuela's Orinoco oil sands are less viscous than Canada's Athabasca oil sands – meaning they can be produced by more conventional means – but they are buried too deep to be extracted by surface mining. Estimates of the recoverable reserves of the Orinoco Belt range from 100 billion barrels (16×10^{9} m^{3}) to 270 billion barrels (43×10^{9} m^{3}). In 2009, the USGS updated this value to 513 billion barrels (8.16×10^{10} m^{3}).

According to the USGS, the Orinoco Belt alone is estimated to contain 900–1,400 billion barrels (2.2×10^{11} m^{3}) of heavy crude in proven and unproven deposits. Of this, the USGS estimated that 380–652 billion barrels (1.037×10^{11} m^{3}) could be technically recoverable, which would make Venezuela's total recoverable reserves (proven and unproven) among the largest in the world. The technology needed to recover ultra-heavy crude oil, such as in most of the Orinoco Belt, may be much more complex and expensive than that of Saudi Arabia's light oil industry. The USGS did not make any attempt to determine how much oil in the Orinoco Belt is economically recoverable. Unless the price of crude rises, it is likely that the proven reserves will have to be adjusted downward.

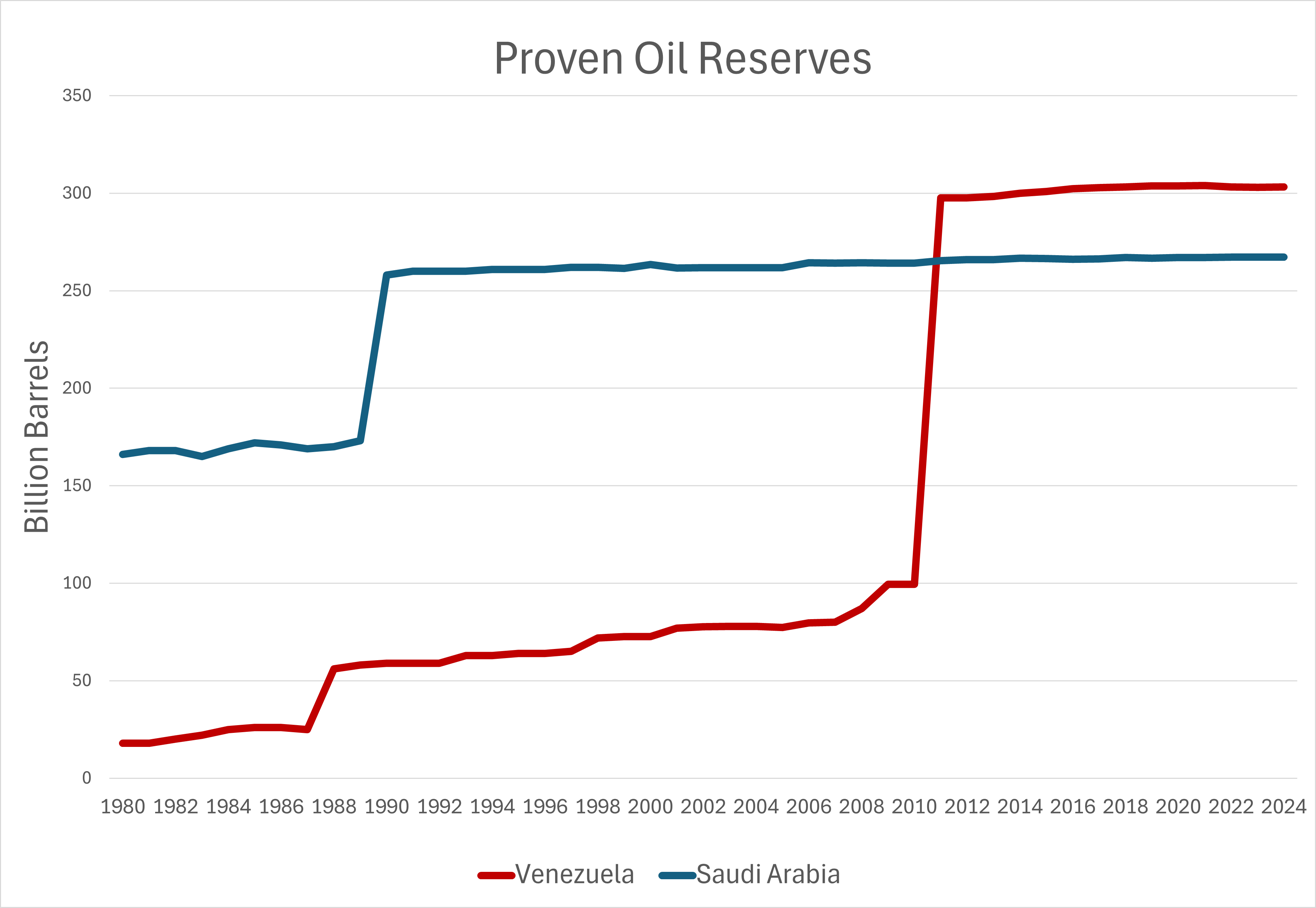
History of Venezuela's claimed reserves (red) in comparison to those of Saudi Arabia (blue)

== Skepticism around reserve figures ==
Some are skeptical of the current estimate of 300 billion barrels, and note that OPEC only publishes the figures given by members and the reserves have not been audited by third parties. The tripling of reserve estimates happened under notoriously corrupt Hugo Chávez and Nicolás Maduro and when oil was around $100 a barrel, meaning a portion of those reserves may no longer be economic to develop. The director of the Latin American Energy Institute at Rice University's Baker Institute for Public Policy suggests that the reserves could be closer to 100-110 billion barrels, and Rystad Energy estimates reserves around 81 billion barrels.

== Comparison to Saudi Arabia ==
In early 2011, then-president Hugo Chávez and the Venezuelan government announced that the nation's oil reserves had surpassed that of the previous long-term world leader, Saudi Arabia. OPEC said that Saudi Arabia's reserves stood at 265 billion barrels (4.21×10^{10} m^{3}) in 2009.

According to Rapier, Venezuela's oil reserves are largely of "extra-heavy crude oil" which might "not be economical to produce" under certain market conditions. (Reuters columnist John Kemp reports that Venezuela's "very dense crudes... are complicated to process," and are priced at a "large discount," when compared to the crudes of other producers.) Rapier notes that the near-quadrupling of Venezuela's claimed "proven" reserves, between 2005 and 2014—from 80 Gbbl to 300 Gbbl—may have been due to soaring crude oil prices that made Venezuela's normally uneconomical heavier crude suddenly market-viable to produce, and thus elevating it to within Venezuela's "proven" reserves. Consequently, Rapier contends, periods of lower crude oil market prices may remove those reserves from the "proven" category—placing Venezuela's viable "proven reserves" well below Saudi Arabia's.

By comparison, Rapier contends, the lighter crude generally associated with Saudi oil fields is cost-effective to produce under most market-price conditions, and thus is more consistently, and uniformly, part of Saudi Arabia's "proven" reserves.

== Geopolitical significance of Venezuelan oil ==
The increase in US sanctions on Venezuela's oil sector in late 2025, including the seizure of tankers and the embargo on Venezuelan oil exports, increased geopolitical risk, energy insecurity, and volatility in the global oil market. In this situation, Venezuela has been forced to offer heavy discounts, especially to Asian buyers, to maintain oil exports. These measures have provoked mixed regional and international reactions in the past. Additionally, the US military presence in the Caribbean and the possibility of further seizures have heightened concerns about market instability and rising oil prices. Rising tensions between the US and Venezuela, as well as the possibility of an escalation of military conflict, could put the country's crude oil production, which is largely heavy oil, at risk and constrain the structure of the global heavy crude oil market. Sanctions are estimated to have diverted the bulk of Venezuela's exports to China and Russia, and any disruption to this supply could lead to a rise in the prices of Brent, West Texas Intermediate, and heavy grades relied on by the United States and Asian markets. Although Venezuela has the world's largest proven oil reserves, its oil production has been declining in recent years owing to sanctions, technical problems, and a lack of investment.

According to sources, Venezuelan oil production is expected to enter a period of gradual decline after reaching a short-term peak. Thus, traders should continue to calculate prices with caution and with higher risk.
